= United States Army Rangers =

Term used for U.S. Army personnel which have served in "Ranger" units

- Active: 17th century – present
- Country: United States of America
- Allegiance: United States of America
- Branch: United States Army
- Type: Special forces
- Role: Special operations
- Garrison/HQ: Fort Benning, Georgia; Fort Lewis, Washington; Hunter Army Airfield, Georgia
- Mottos: Sua Sponte (Of Their Own Accord): 75th Ranger Regiment; Rangers Lead the Way: Army Ranger–qualified soldiers
- Engagements: World War II; Korean War; Vietnam War; Operation Eagle Claw; United States invasion of Grenada; United States Invasion of Panama; Gulf War; Operation Gothic Serpent; Kosovo War; Iraq War; War in Afghanistan; Operation Inherent Resolve; US intervention in the Syrian civil war

Insignia
- NATO Map Symbol (1998)

- NATO Map Symbol (2017)

The United States Army Rangers are U.S. Army personnel who have served in any unit which has held the official designation of "Ranger". The term is commonly used to include graduates of the Ranger School, even if they have never served in a "Ranger" unit, because Army regulations and special qualification identifier (SQI) codes provide that the only requirement to earn the "Title: Ranger" is that a soldier "must successfully complete the appropriate training at the Infantry School."

In a broader and less formal sense, the term "ranger" has been used, officially and unofficially, in North America since the 17th century, to describe specialized light infantry in small, independent units—usually companies. The first units to be officially designated Rangers were companies recruited in the New England Colonies to fight against Native Americans in King Philip's War. Following that time, the term became more common in official usage, during the French and Indian Wars of the 18th century. The U.S. military has had "Ranger" companies since the American Revolutionary War. British Army units designated as "Rangers" have often also had historical links of some kind to British North America.

The 75th Ranger Regiment is an elite airborne light infantry combat formation within the United States Army Special Operations Command (USASOC). The six battalions of the modern Rangers have been deployed in Korea, Vietnam, Grenada, Panama, Afghanistan and Iraq. The Ranger Regiment traces its lineage to three of six battalions raised in World War II, and to the 5307th Composite Unit (Provisional)—known as "Merrill's Marauders", and then reflagged as the 475th Infantry, then later as the 75th Infantry.

The Ranger Training Brigade (RTB)—headquartered at Fort Benning—is an organization under the United States Army Training and Doctrine Command (TRADOC) and is separate from the 75th Ranger Regiment. It has been in service in various forms since World War II. The Ranger Training Brigade administers Ranger School, the satisfactory completion of which is required to earn the title Ranger and to wear the Ranger Tab.

== History ==
=== Colonial period ===
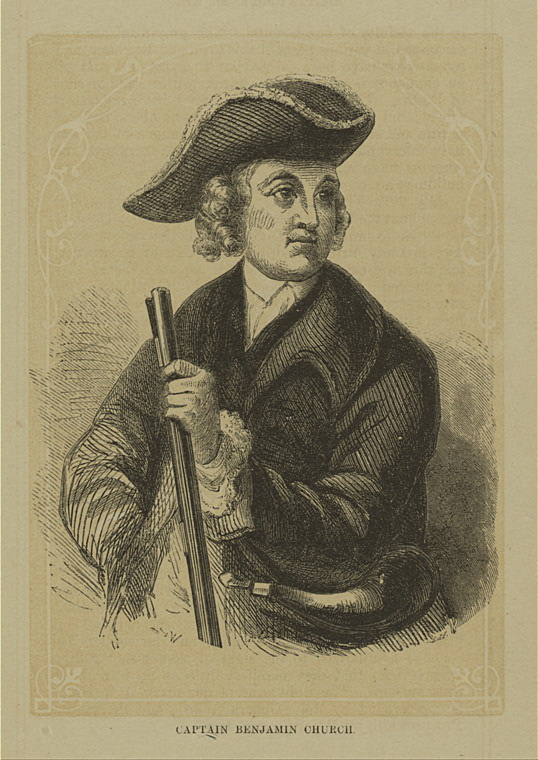
Colonel Benjamin Church (1639–1718), father of American Ranging and Rangers. He is in the U.S. Army Ranger Hall of Fame and has a bronze Ranger Tab affixed to his gravestone.

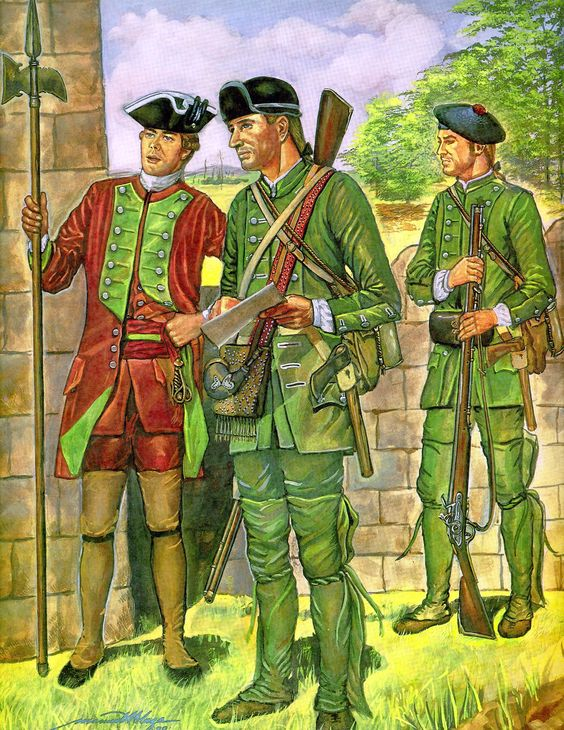
1988 illustration of two soldiers of Rogers' Rangers conferring with a British Army sergeant by Manuel B. Ablaza

Rangers played a crucial role in the 17th and 18th-century conflicts between American colonists and Native American tribes. British regular troops were unfamiliar with frontier warfare, leading to the development of Ranger companies to specialize in such tactics. Rangers were full-time soldiers employed by colonial governments to patrol between fixed frontier fortifications in reconnaissance providing early warning of raids. In offensive operations, they were scouts and guides, locating villages and other targets for taskforces drawn from the militia or other colonial troops.

In Colonial America, "The earliest mention of Ranger operations comes from Capt. John "Samuel" Smith", who wrote in 1622, "When I had ten men able to go abroad, our common wealth was very strong: with such a number I ranged that unknown country 14 weeks." Robert Black also stated that,

In 1622, after the Berkeley Plantation Massacre ... grim-faced men went forth to search out the Indian enemy. They were militia—citizen soldiers—but they were learning to blend the methods of Indian and European warfare ... As they went in search of the enemy, the words range, ranging and Ranger were frequently used ... The American Ranger had been born.

The father of American ranging is Colonel Benjamin Church (c. 1639–1718). He was the captain of the first Ranger force in America (1676). Church was commissioned by the Governor of the Plymouth Colony Josiah Winslow to form the first ranger company for King Philip's War. He later employed the company to raid Acadia during King William's War and Queen Anne's War.

Benjamin Church designed his force primarily to emulate Native American patterns of war. Toward this end, Church endeavored to learn to fight like Native Americans from Native Americans. Americans became rangers exclusively under the tutelage of the Native American allies. (Until the end of the colonial period, rangers depended on Native Americans as both allies and teachers.)

Church developed a special full-time unit mixing white colonists selected for frontier skills with friendly Native Americans to carry out offensive strikes against hostile Native Americans in terrain where normal militia units were ineffective. In 1716, his memoirs, entitled Entertaining Passages relating to Philip's War, was published and is considered by some to constitute the first American military manual.

Under Church served the father and grandfather of two famous rangers of the eighteenth century: John Lovewell and John Gorham respectively. John Lovewell served during Dummer's War (also known as Lovewell's War). He lived in present-day Nashua, New Hampshire. He fought in Dummer's War as a militia captain, leading three expeditions against the Abenaki tribe. John Lovewell became the most famous Ranger of the eighteenth century.

Many Colonial officers would take the philosophies of Benjamin Church's ranging and form their own Ranger units. During King George's War, John Gorham established "Gorham's Rangers". Gorham's company fought on the frontier at Acadia and Nova Scotia. Gorham was commissioned a captain in the British Army in recognition of his outstanding service. He was the first of three prominent American rangers–himself, his younger brother Joseph Gorham and Robert Rogers—to earn such commissions in the British Army. (Many others, such as George Washington, were unsuccessful in their attempts to achieve a British rank.)

Rogers' Rangers was established in 1751 by Major Robert Rogers, who organized nine Ranger companies in the American colonies. Roger's Island, in modern day Fort Edward, NY, is considered the "spiritual home" of the United States Special Operations Forces, particularly the United States Army Rangers. These early American light infantry units, organized during the French and Indian War, bore the name "Rangers" and were the forerunners of the modern Army Rangers. Major Rogers drafted the first currently-known set of standard orders for rangers. These rules, Robert Rogers' 28 "Rules of Ranging", are still provided to all new Army Rangers upon graduation from training, and served as one of the first modern manuals for asymmetric warfare.

=== American Revolution ===
==== Loyalist Rangers ====
Fearing that Rogers was a spy, Washington refused to accept Rogers help. An incensed Rogers instead joined with the Loyalists, raised the Queen's Rangers, and fought for the Crown, giving historical confirmation to Washington's concerns about the depth of his patriotism. While serving with the British, Col. Rogers was further responsible for capturing America's most famous spy in Nathan Hale.

After Colonel Robert Rogers left the Queen's Rangers, he travelled to Nova Scotia, where he raised King's Rangers, in 1779. The regiment was disbanded in 1783.

==== Continental Rangers ====
In 1775, the Continental Congress later formed eight companies of elite light infantry to fight in the Revolutionary War, several notable Rangers-led Continental units such as Jonathan Moulton, Moses Hazen, Simeon Thayer, Nathaniel Hutchins, and Israel Putnam. In 1777, this force commanded by Daniel Morgan, was known as The Corps of Rangers. Francis Marion, "The Swamp Fox", organized another famous Revolutionary War Ranger element known as "Marion's Partisans". Perhaps the most famous Ranger unit in the Revolutionary War was Butler's Rangers, from upstate New York. Continental Army Rangers officers such as John Stark, commanded the 1st New Hampshire Regiment, which gained fame at the Battles of Bunker Hill and Bennington. Ethan Allen and his Green Mountain Boys in Vermont were also designated as a ranger unit.

The "1776" on the United States Army Intelligence Service seal refers to the formation of Knowlton's Rangers

Later on during the war, General Washington ordered Lieutenant Colonel Thomas Knowlton to select an elite group of men for reconnaissance missions. This unit was known as Knowlton's Rangers, and is credited as the first official Ranger unit (by name) for the United States. This unit carried out intelligence functions rather than combat functions in most cases, and as such are not generally considered the historical parent of the modern day Army Rangers.

In June 1775 Ethan Allen and Seth Warner had the Continental Congress create a Continental Ranger Regiment including many of the famed Green Mountain Boys. Warner was elected the Regiment's Colonel with the Rangers forming part of the Continental Army's Invasion of Quebec in 1775. The Regiment was disbanded in 1779.

Francis Marion, the "Swamp Fox" Revolutionary commander of South Carolina, developed irregular methods of warfare during his guerrilla period in South Carolina. He is credited in the lineage of the Army Rangers, as is George Rogers Clark who led an irregular force of Kentucky/Virginia militiamen to capture the British forts at Vincennes, Indiana and Kaskaskia, Illinois.

=== War of 1812 ===
In January 1812 the United States authorized six companies of United States Rangers who were mounted infantry with the function of protecting the Western frontier. Five of these companies were raised in Ohio, Indiana, Illinois and Kentucky. A sixth was in Middle Tennessee, organized by Capt. David Mason. The next year, 10 new companies were raised. By December 1813 the Army Register listed officers of 12 companies of Rangers. The Ranger companies were discharged in June 1815.

=== Black Hawk War ===
During the Black Hawk War, in 1832, the Battalion of Mounted Rangers, an early version of the cavalry in the U.S. Army was created out of frontiersmen who enlisted for one year and provided their own rifles and horses. The battalion was organized into six companies of 100 men each that was led by Major Henry Dodge. After their enlistment expired there was no creation of a second battalion. Instead, the battalion was reorganized into the 1st Dragoon Regiment.

=== Civil War ===
Several units that were named and functioned similarly to Rangers fought in the American Civil War between 1861 and 1865, such as the Loudoun Rangers that consisted of Quaker and German farmers from northern Loudoun County. They were founded by Captain Samuel C. Means, a Virginian refugee who was approached by Washington to form two detachments on 20 June 1862. The Loudoun Rangers conducted periodic raids in Loudoun, Clarke and Jefferson counties. Military historian Darl L. Stephenson stated that a unit called the Blazer's Scouts were also a precursor to Army Rangers during the Civil War. Aside from conducting similar irregular warfare on Confederate forces in Richmond, Mississippi and Tennessee, its members were also descendants of the first ranger groups, organized by Robert Rogers in the French and Indian War. The Blazer's Scouts were instrumental in fighting off other irregular forces such as partisan bushwhackers and Mosby's Rangers, another unit of Rangers that fought for the Confederacy.

=== World War II ===
In May 1942, Brigadier-General Lucian Truscott was appointed the liaison officer to the British Combined Operations Headquarters; he submitted a proposal to the Army Chief of Staff, General George C. Marshall, that selectively trained Ranger soldiers were recruited for the newly established special operations Army Ranger Battalion. Five Ranger Battalions would be organized in the European Theatre including the 1st, 2nd, 3rd, 4th and 5th; the 6th would be organized in the Pacific Theatre. The 7th, 8th, 9th, and 10th Ranger Battalions were "Ghost" formations, which were part of the deception plan known as "Operation Quicksilver."

==== European theater ====
World War II "lozenge" patch

On 19 June 1942 the 1st Ranger Battalion was sanctioned, recruited, and began training in Carrickfergus, Northern Ireland. Eighty percent of the original Rangers came from the 34th Infantry Division.

A select fifty or so of the first U.S. Rangers were dispersed through the British Commandos for the Dieppe Raid in August 1942; these were the first American soldiers to see ground combat in the European theater.

Together with the ensuing 3rd and 4th Ranger Battalions they fought in North Africa and Italy commanded by Colonel William Orlando Darby until the Battle of Cisterna (29 January 1944) when most of the Rangers of the 1st and 3rd Battalions were captured. Of the 767 men in the battalions 761 were killed or captured. The remaining Rangers were absorbed into the Canadian-American First Special Service Force under Brigadier General Robert T. Frederick. They were then instrumental in operations in and around the Anzio beachhead that followed Operation Shingle.

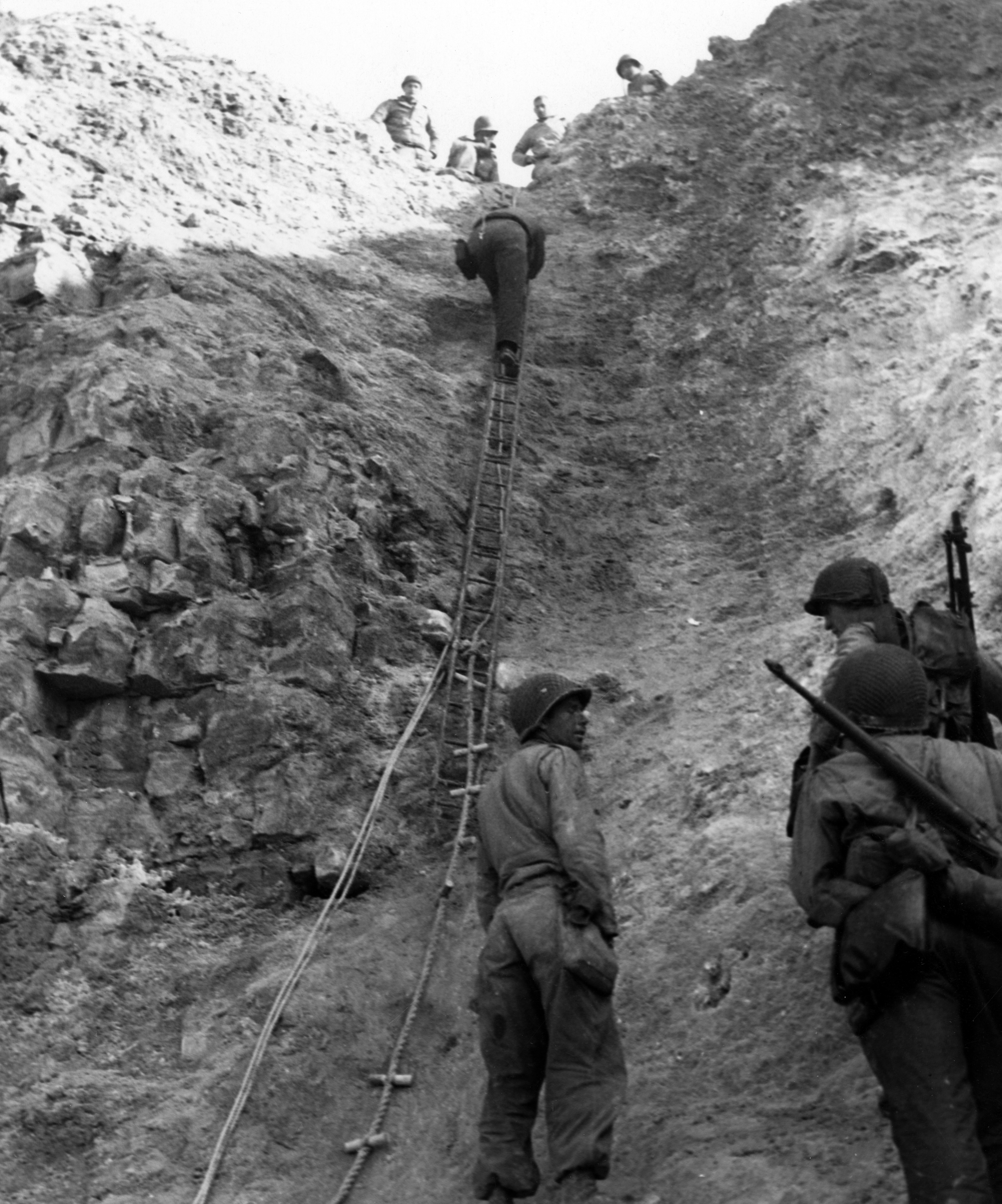
D-Day, Pointe du Hoc

The 29th Ranger Battalion was a temporary unit made of selected volunteers from the 29th Infantry Division that was in existence from December 1942 to November 1943.

Before the 5th Ranger Battalion landing on Dog White sector on Omaha Beach, during the Invasion of Normandy, the 2nd Ranger Battalion scaled the 90-foot (27 m) cliffs of Pointe du Hoc, a few miles to the west, to destroy a five-gun battery of captured French Canon de 155 mm GPF guns. The gun positions were empty on the day and the weapons had been removed some time before to allow the construction of casements in their place. (One of the gun positions was destroyed by the RAF in May—prior to D-Day—leaving five missing guns). Under constant fire during their climb, they encountered only a small company of Germans on the cliffs and subsequently discovered a group of field artillery weapons in trees some 1,000 yards (910 m) to the rear. The guns were disabled and destroyed, and the Rangers then cut and held the main road for two days before being relieved, all whilst being reinforced by members of the 5th Ranger Battalion who arrived at 6pm on 6 June from Omaha Beach. Following the completion of their Pointe du Hoc objectives, the 2nd Ranger Companies of Able, Baker and Charlie landed along with the 5th Rangers at Omaha Beach at Dog Green and Dog White sectors where they suffred extremely heavy casualties but were able to complete their D-Day objectives. Able Company suffered up to 96 percent casualties with just two Rangers makng it off the beaches. More 5th Ranger units arrived by sea on 7 June when some of their wounded along with German prisoners were taken away to the waiting ships.

==== Pacific theater ====
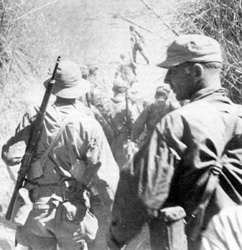
Rangers en route to liberate allied soldiers in the Cabanatuan POW camp

Two separate Ranger units fought the war in the Pacific Theater. The 98th Field Artillery Battalion was formed on 16 December 1940 and activated at Fort Lewis in January 1941. On 26 September 1944, they were converted from field artillery to light infantry and became 6th Ranger Battalion. 6th Ranger Battalion led the invasion of the Philippines and executed the raid on the Cabanatuan POW camp. They continued fighting in the Philippines until they were deactivated on 30 December 1945, in Japan.

After the first Quebec Conference, the 5307th Composite Unit (provisional) was formed with Frank Merrill as the commander, its 2,997 officers and men became popularly known as Merrill's Marauders. They began training in India on 31 October 1943. Much of the Marauders training was based on Major General Orde Wingate of the British Army who specialized in deep penetration raids behind Japanese lines. The 5307th Composite Group was composed of the six color-coded combat teams that would become part of modern Ranger heraldry, they fought against the Japanese during the Burma Campaign. In February 1944, the Marauders began a 1,000-mile (1,600 km) march over the Himalayan mountain range and through the Burmese jungle to strike behind the Japanese lines. By March, they had managed to cut off Japanese forces in Maingkwan and cut their supply lines in the Hukawng Valley. On 17 May, the Marauders and Chinese forces captured the Myitkyina airfield, the only all-weather airfield in Burma. For their actions, every member of the unit received the Bronze Star.

==== Motto ====
On 6 June 1944, during the assault landing on Dog White sector of Omaha Beach as part of the invasion of Normandy, then-Brigadier General Norman Cota (assistant division commander of the 29th Infantry Division) approached Major Max Schneider, CO of the 5th Ranger Battalion and asked "What outfit is this?", Schneider answered "5th Rangers, Sir!" To this, Cota replied "Well, goddamnit, if you're Rangers, lead the way!" From this, the Ranger motto—"Rangers lead the way!"—was born.

=== Korean War ===
At the outbreak of the Korean War, a unique Ranger unit was formed. Led by Second Lieutenant Ralph Puckett, the Eighth Army Ranger Company was created in August 1950. It served as the role model for the rest of the soon to be formed Ranger units. Instead of being organized into self-contained battalions, the Ranger units of the Korean and Vietnam eras were organized into companies and then attached to larger units, to serve as organic special operations units.

In total, sixteen additional Ranger companies were formed in the next seven months: Eighth Army Raider Company and First through Fifteenth Ranger Company. The Army Chief of Staff assigned the Ranger training program at Fort Benning to Colonel John Gibson Van Houten. The program eventually split to include a training program located in Korea. 3rd Ranger Company and the 7th Ranger Company were tasked to train new Rangers.

The next four Ranger companies were formed 28 October 1950. Soldiers from the 505th Airborne Regiment and the 82nd Airborne's 80th Anti-aircraft Artillery Battalion volunteered and, after initially being designated the 4th Ranger Company, became the 2nd Ranger Company—the only all-black Ranger unit in United States history. After the four companies had begun their training, they were joined by the 5th–8th Ranger companies on 20 November 1950.

During the course of the war, the Rangers patrolled and probed, scouted and destroyed, attacked and ambushed the Communist Chinese and North Korean enemy. The 1st Rangers destroyed the 12th North Korean Division headquarters in a daring night raid. The 2nd and 4th Rangers made a combat airborne assault near Munsan where Life Magazine reported that Allied troops were now patrolling north of the 38th Parallel. Crucially, the 2nd Rangers plugged the gap made by the retreating Allied forces, the 5th Ranger Company helped stop the Chinese 5th Phase Offensive. As in World War II, after the Korean War, the Rangers were disbanded.

=== Vietnam War ===
Long Range Reconnaissance Patrol (LRRP) and Long Range Patrol companies (commonly known as Lurps) were formed by the U.S. Army in the early 1960s in West Germany to provide small, heavily armed reconnaissance teams to patrol deep in enemy-held territory in case of war with the Soviet Union and its Warsaw Pact allies.

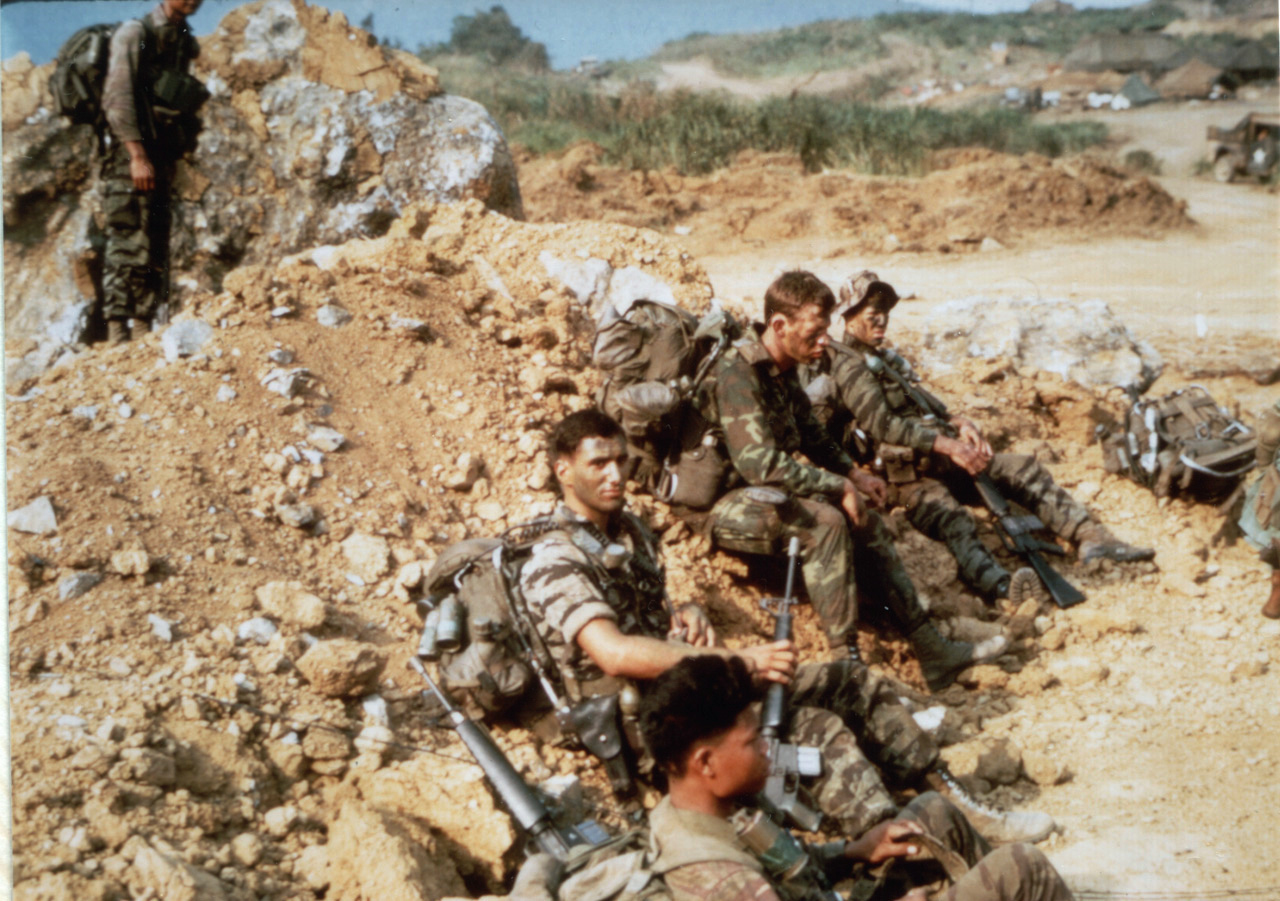
7 April 1968. Company E LRP team at LZ Stud awaiting Khe Sanh patrol

During the Vietnam War, Long-Range Reconnaissance Patrol (LRRP) platoons and companies were attached to every brigade and division to conduct reconnaissance operations. Because the mountainous terrain restricted tactical radio line of sight and satellite communications were not available for ground troops, capturing elevated terrain for radio relay sites was necessary. On 19 April 1968, members of Company E, 52nd Infantry (LRP), 1st Cavalry Division (later redesignated Company H, 75th Infantry (Ranger)), executed a long-range penetration operation into the A Shau Valley against the North Vietnamese Army (NVA). The unit seized the 4,879-foot (1,487 m) peak of Dong Re Lao Mountain, designated "Signal Hill", establishing a radio relay outpost that allowed the 1st and 3rd Brigades operating inside the valley to maintain continuous communications with Camp Evans and incoming support aircraft during Operation Delaware.

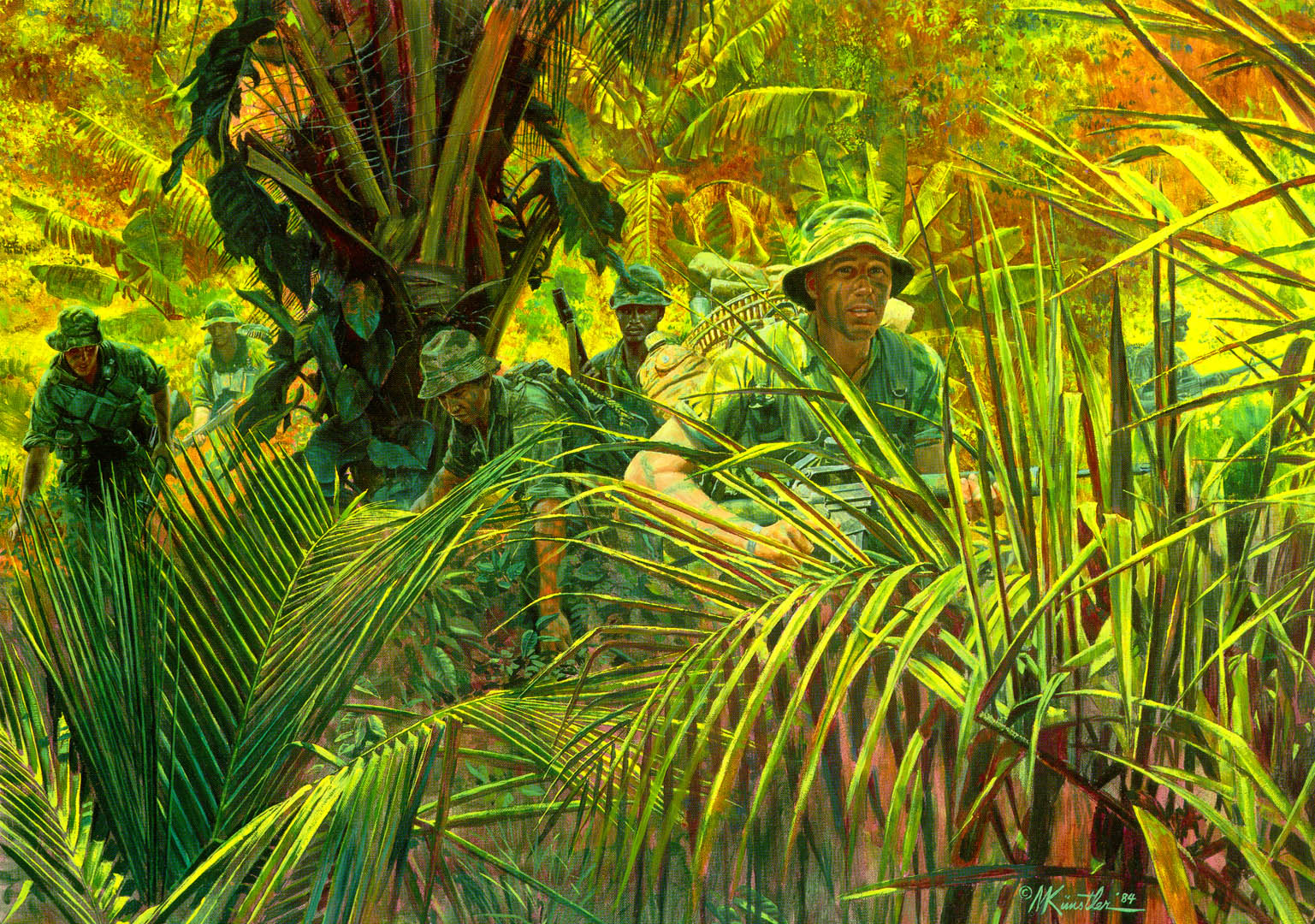
Rangers of D co 151st infantry, Indiana National Guard. South Vietnam 1969

On 1 January 1969, under the new U.S. Army Combat Arms Regimental System (CARS), these units were redesignated "Ranger" in South Vietnam within the 75th Infantry Regiment (Ranger) and all replacement personnel were mandatory airborne qualified. Fifteen companies of Rangers were raised from LRRP units, which had been performing missions in Europe since the early 1960s and in Vietnam since 1966. The genealogy of this new Regiment was linked to Merrill's Marauders. The Rangers were organized as independent companies: A, B, C, D, E, F, G, H, I, K, L, M, N, O and P, with one notable exception, since 1816, U.S. Army units have not included a Juliet or "J" company, (the reason for this is because the letter 'J' looked too similar to the letter 'I' in Old English script). Companies A and B were respectively assigned to V Corps at Fort Hood, Texas, and VII Corps at Fort Lewis, Washington.

In addition to scouting and reconnoitering roles for their parent formations, Ranger units provided terrain-assessment and tactical or special security missions; undertook recovery operations to locate and retrieve prisoners of war; captured enemy soldiers for interrogation and intelligence-gathering purposes; tapped North Vietnamese Army and Vietcong wire communications lines in their established base areas along the Ho Chi Minh trail; and mined enemy trails as well as motor-vehicle transport routes. To provide tactical skills and patrol expertise all LRRP/Ranger team leaders and most assistant team leaders were graduates of the 5th Special Forces Group Recondo School at Nha Trang Vietnam.

== Post-Vietnam era ==
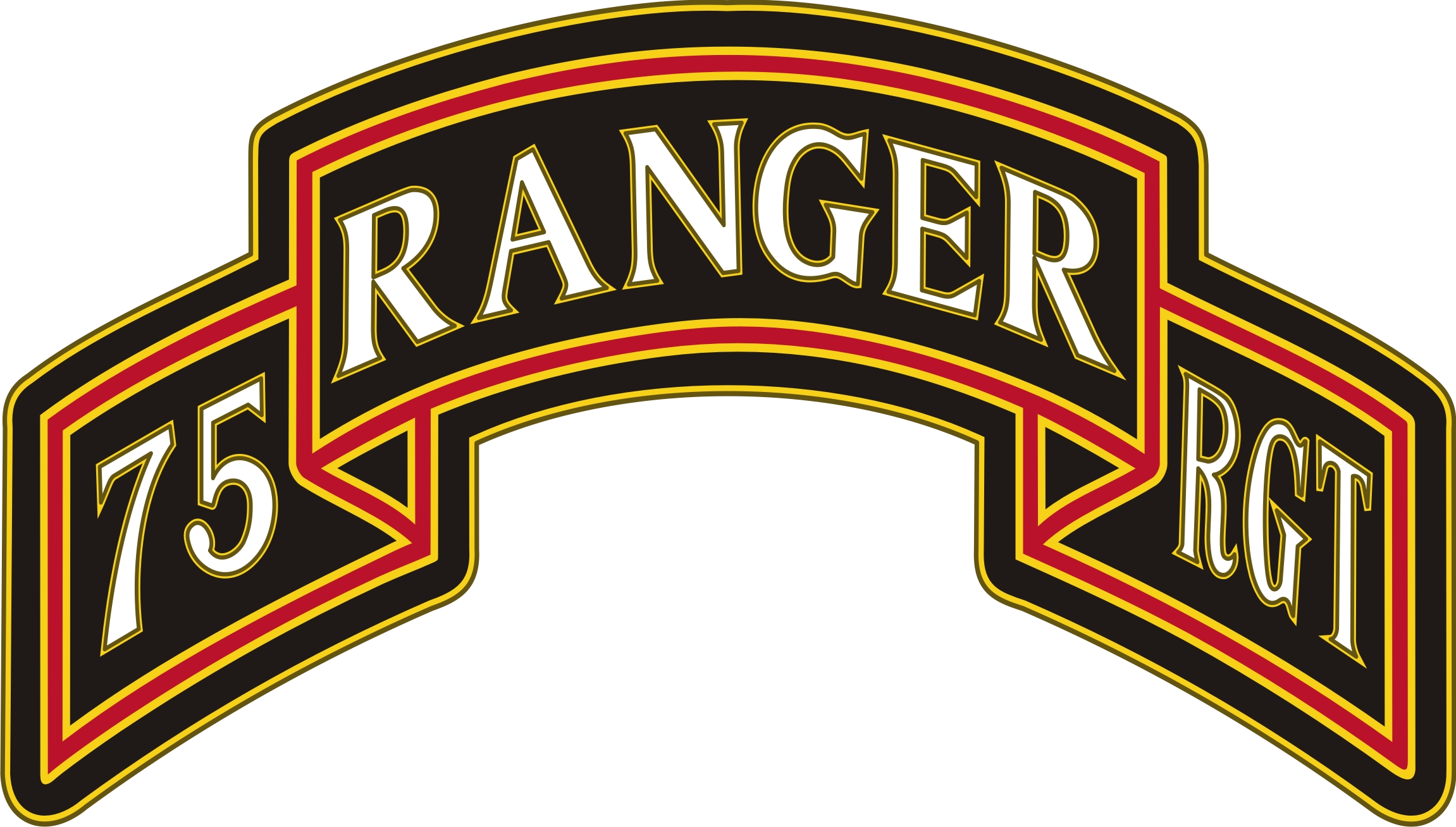
75th Ranger Regiment Scroll

After the Vietnam War, division and brigade commanders determined that the U.S. Army needed an elite, rapidly deployable light infantry, so on 31 January 1974 General Creighton Abrams asked General Kenneth C. Leuer to activate, organize, train and command the first battalion sized Ranger unit since World War II. Initially, the 1st Ranger Battalion was constituted; because of its success, eight months later, 1 October 1974, the 2nd Ranger Battalion was constituted, and in 1984 the 3rd Ranger Battalion and their regimental headquarters were created. In 1986, the 75th Ranger Regiment was formed and their military lineage formally authorized. The regiment, comprising three battalions, is the premier light infantry unit of the U.S. Army, a combination of special operations and elite airborne light infantry. The regiment is a flexible, highly trained and rapid light infantry unit specialized to be employed against any special operations targets. All Rangers—whether they are in the 75th Ranger Regiment, or Ranger School, or both—are taught to live by the Ranger Creed. Primary tasks include: direct action, national and international emergency crisis response, airfield seizure, airborne & air assault operations, special reconnaissance, intelligence & counter intelligence, combat search and rescue, personnel recovery & hostage rescue, joint special operations, and counter terrorism.

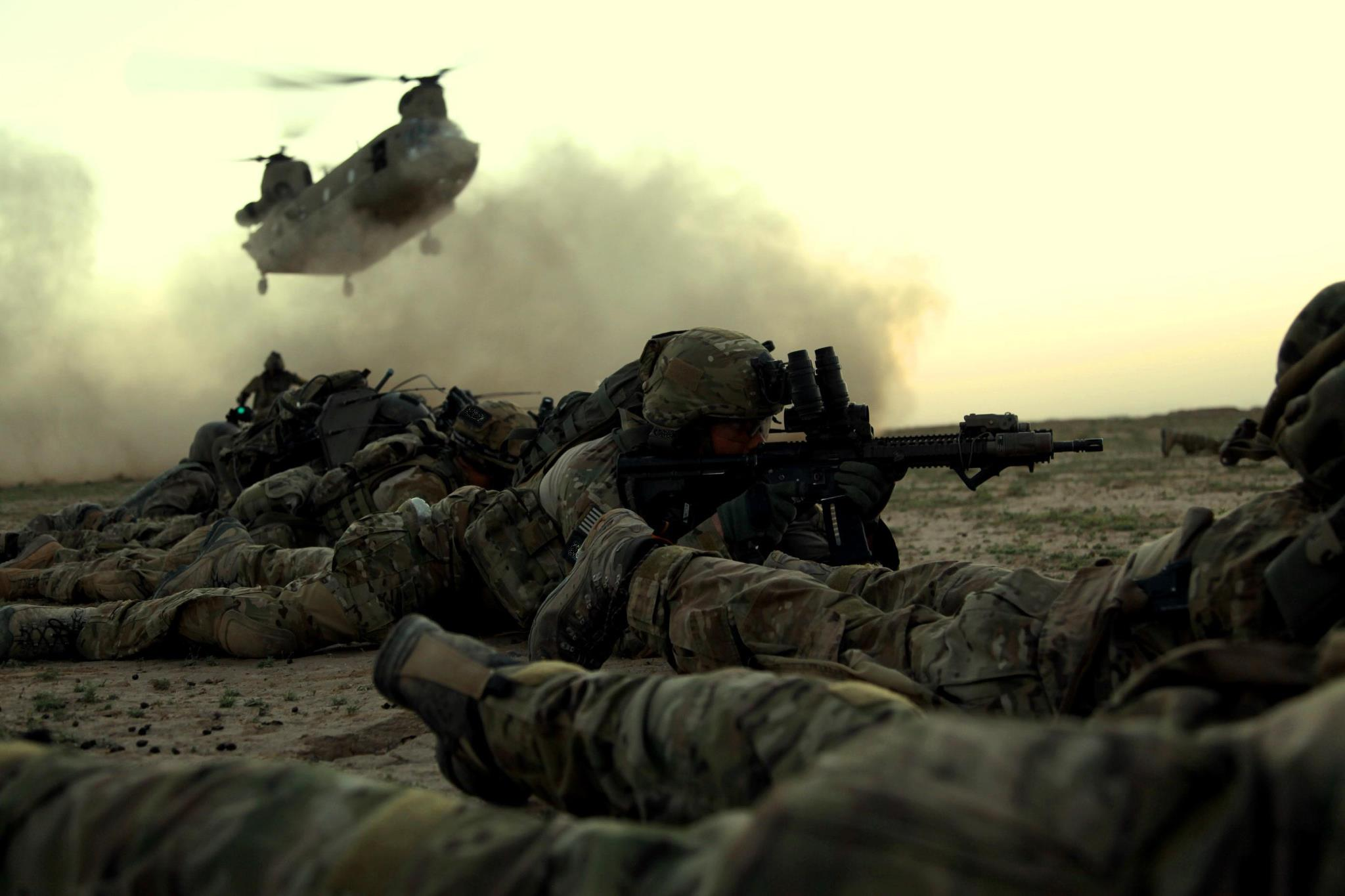
Rangers from 1st Battalion operating in Ghazni Province, Afghanistan, 13 February 2012

The 4th, 5th, and 6th Ranger Battalions were re-activated as the Ranger Training Brigade, the cadre of instructors of the contemporary Ranger School; moreover, because they are parts of a TRADOC school, the 4th, 5th, and 6th battalions are not a part of the 75th Ranger Regiment.

The Rangers have participated in numerous operations throughout modern history. In 1980, the Rangers were involved with Operation Eagle Claw, the 1980 second rescue attempt of American hostages in Tehran, Iran. In 1983, the 1st and 2nd Ranger Battalions conducted Operation Urgent Fury in Grenada. All three Ranger battalions, with a headquarters element, participated in the U.S. invasion of Panama (Operation Just Cause) in 1989. In 1991 Bravo Company, the first platoon and Anti-Tank section from Alpha Company, 1st Battalion was deployed in the Persian Gulf War (Operations Desert Storm and Desert Shield). Bravo Company, 3rd Ranger Battalion was the base unit of Task Force Ranger in Operation Gothic Serpent, in Somalia in 1993, concurrent with Operation Restore Hope. In 1994, soldiers from the 1st, 2nd, and 3rd Ranger Battalions deployed to Haiti (before the operation's cancellation. The force was recalled 5 miles (8.0 km) from the Haitian coast.). The 3rd Ranger Battalion supported the initial war effort in Afghanistan, in 2001. The Ranger Regiment has been involved in multiple deployments in support of Operation Iraqi Freedom since 2003.

=== War on terror ===
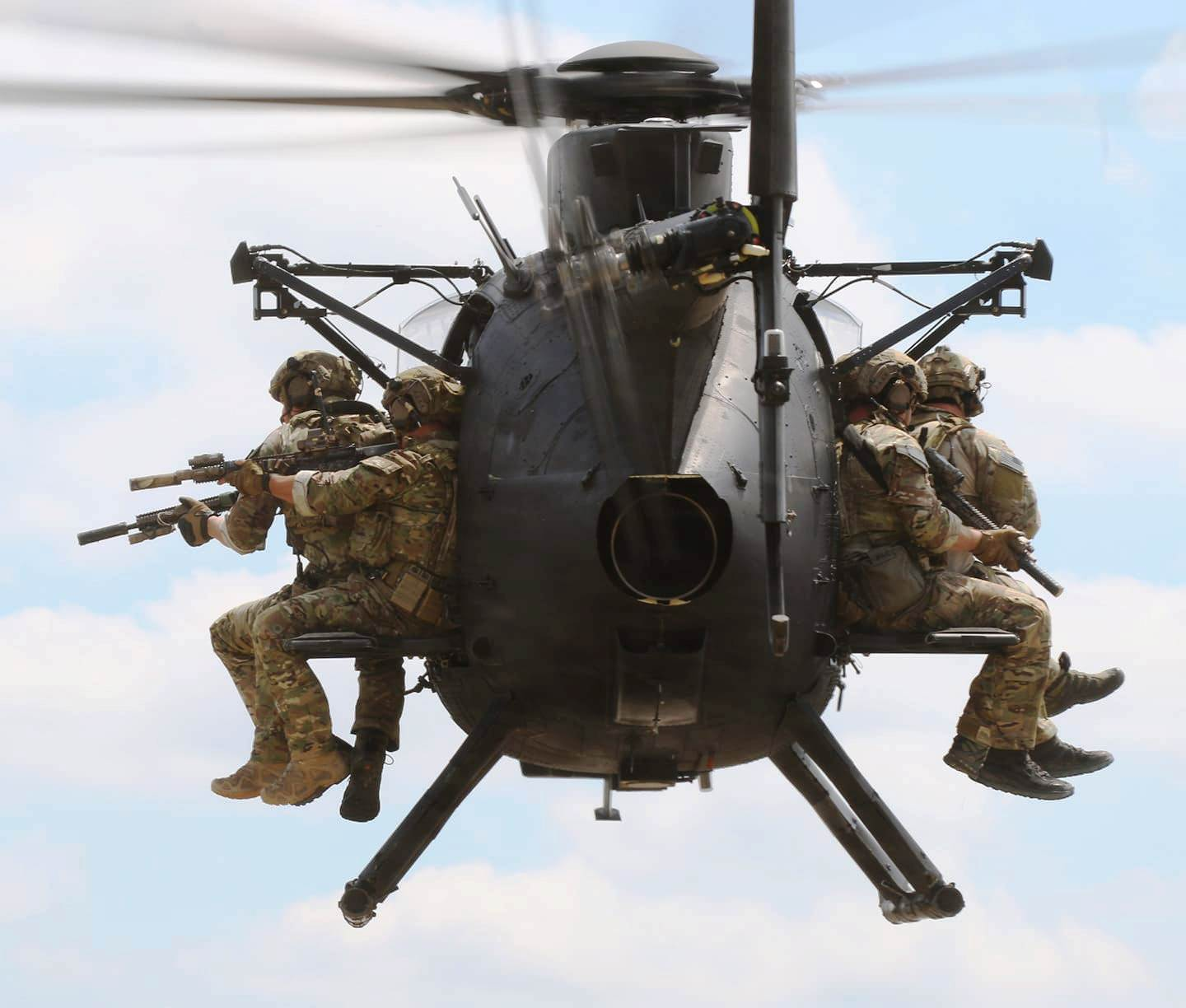
Rangers from 1st Battalion during rapid deployment exercises

In response to the 11 September terrorist strikes, the United States launched the war on terror with the invasion of Afghanistan in October 2001. Special operations units such as the Rangers, along with some CIA officers and Navy SEALs were the first U.S. forces on Afghan soil during Operation Enduring Freedom. This was the first large Ranger operation since the Battle of Mogadishu.

The Rangers met with success during the invasion aimed at overthrowing the Taliban government, in which they participated in two operations to secure strategic areas in Kandahar Province in Southern Afghanistan.

The first operation, Operation Rhino, was designed to take control of a landing strip from the Taliban that would be useful for future missions. The Rangers faced little opposition during their attack on the airfield and didn't suffer any casualties during the mission. However, two Rangers from another group who were assigned to provide rescue support from a location in Pakistan died when their helicopter crashed. The seized landing strip would later become known as Camp Rhino.

The second operation after seizing the airstrip was a supporting mission to assist Delta Force in an operation to raid a Taliban compound, known as Objective Gecko, in which the Taliban leader, Mullah Omar, was rumoured to be hiding. The Rangers set up blocking positions while Delta Force secured the compound. There were no Taliban inside the compound itself, but both the Rangers and Delta Force were ambushed by a group of Taliban fighters as they prepared to leave the area. During the ensuing firefight, one soldier reportedly had his foot blown off by an RPG.

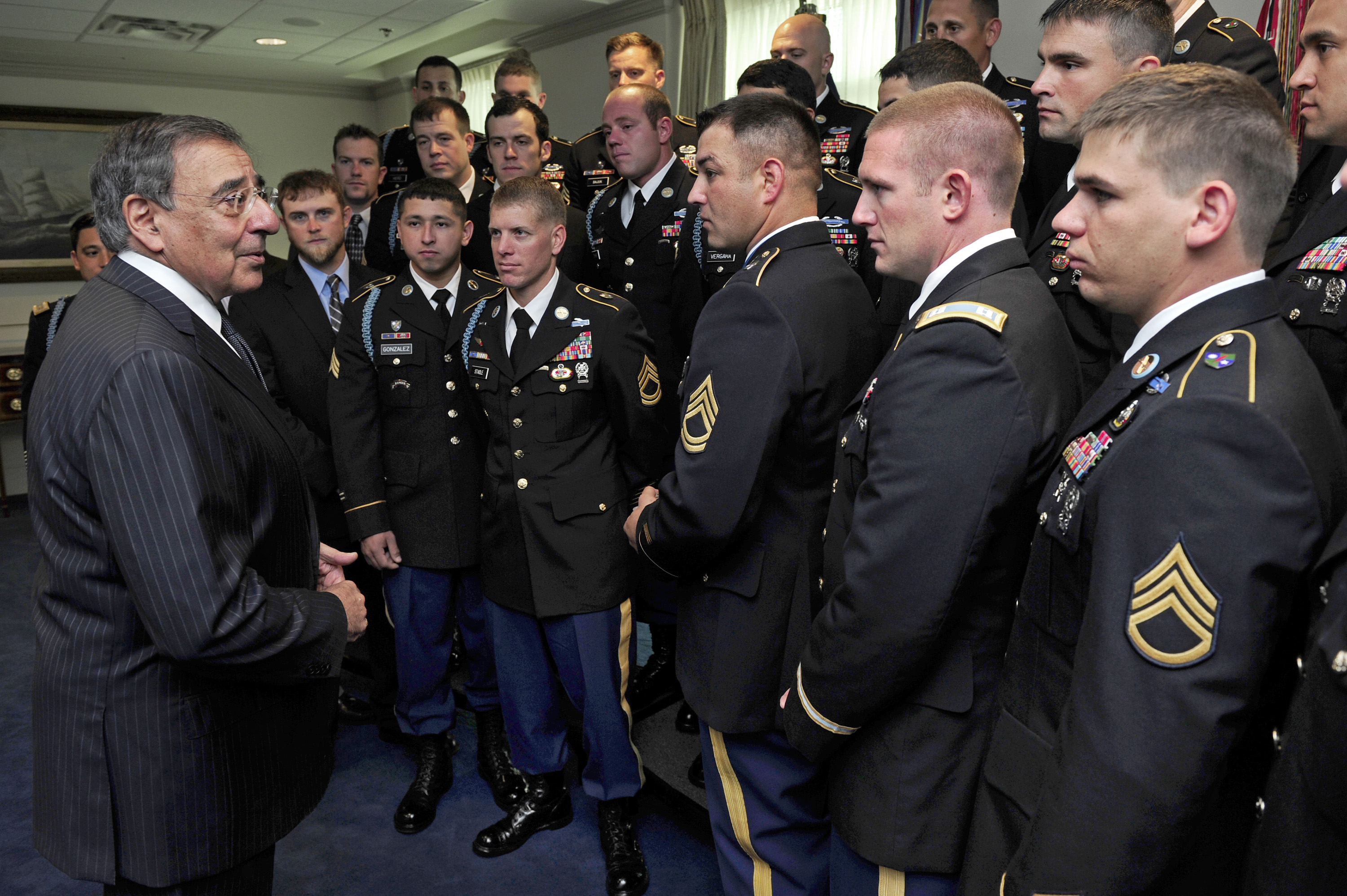
Secretary of Defense Leon Panetta meeting with 75th Ranger Regiment soldiers, July 2011

These two operations have been the subject of intense debate, with critics contending that they put the soldiers at unnecessary risk and had no clear strategic value or intelligence gains. There are even some who suggest that politicians in Washington ordered these operations purely for political gain, using soldiers as pawns to advance their own interests.

The following year, the Rangers also participated in the biggest firefight of Operation Anaconda in 2002 at Takur Ghar.

In 2003, when the United States invaded Iraq, the Rangers were among those sent in. During the beginning of the war, they faced some of Iraq's elite Republican Guard units. Rangers were also involved in the rescue of American prisoner of war POW Private First Class Jessica Lynch. The 75th Ranger Regiment has been one of the few units to have members continuously deployed in Iraq and Afghanistan.

In January 2016, Canadian hostage Colin Rutherford was handed over to the Rangers and FBI agents in Afghanistan.

== Army National Guard Ranger Companies ==
In 1967 the Indiana National Guard formed two Long Range Patrol Companies followed by the Michigan National Guard in 1968 using leftover personnel from National Guard Airborne Infantry Battalions. Under the Combat Arms Regimental System (CARS) order of 1969, all LRP/LRRP were redesignated Ranger Companies through TO&E 7-157 (E, G, and later H), active component Ranger Companies were consolidated into 75th Infantry Regiment, while the only change in National Guard designations were from LRP to Ranger. Three more National guard Ranger Companies were later formed along with unit consolidations in Indiana and Michigan. Overall there were eight companies spanning their twenty-year history. There were a total of seven National Guard Ranger companies during the Vietnam conflict but not more than five during any given time. Co D (Ranger) 151st Infantry was the only reserve component Infantry unit to see combat in Vietnam and emerged as one of the most decorated Infantry companies throughout the war. At close of the Vietnam conflict, the Abrams Charter reorganized the Active Component Ranger Companies into Ranger Battalions while only three independent Ranger Companies remained throughout the US Army's arsenal and resided solely in the National Guard using Vietnam era TO&E 7-157. In the late 1970s the number shrunk to two companies after deactivation of the famed D co (Ranger) 151st Infantry. Upon the Deactivation of Texas National Guard's 36th Airborne Infantry Brigade, the TO&E 7-157 and Ranger designation from a Company in Puerto Rico National Guard was transferred to an Airborne Infantry Company in Texas. During much of the 1980s the National Guard's only two Ranger Companies were F co (Ranger) 425th Infantry and G co (Ranger) 143rd Infantry. These two ranger units were aligned with I Corps and III Corps respectively while continuing to follow TO&E 7-157 during training with foreign special operations units and while participating in large scale NATO exercises in Europe. During this time the Active Component were also separately developing the Long Range Surveillance (LRS) doctrine through Provisional companies in the 1st Infantry Division, 9th Infantry Division, and 82nd Airborne Division. In 1984 the Army adopted LRS doctrine and in 1985 the Active component and National Guard began forming a LRS detachment (LRSD) for every maneuver Division and a LRS company (LRSC) for every Corps, essentially stripping the ranger designations from the last two National Guard companies. In 1987 F/425 continued with I Corps, G/143 with III Corps, both as LRSCs, and D/151 returned as Trp F 1st 238 Cavalry (LRSU). In 2016 the 151st LRSD, the final National Guard LRSU with Ranger lineage, was redesignated into a light infantry company, ending the final chapter on National Guard Ranger/LRRP Companies and their unique legacy.

All National Guard Ranger company veterans and their successors are recognized for active membership into the Long Range Reconnaissance Association (LRRA); D co (Ranger) 151st Infantry and their successors are recognized for regular membership into the 75th Ranger Regiment Association (75RRA) due to their D/75 combat affiliation during the Vietnam Conflict;. However, the US Army Ranger Association (USARA) uses The Institute of Heraldry (an Army regalia, insignia, and symbolism authority, not a lineage authority like the CMH) instead of Official DA Organizational Authority (OA) letters demonstrating assigned TOE 7-157G and 7-157H (Abn Inf Ranger Co) as their rational for eligibility, and only recognizes E co (Ranger) 65th Infantry, D co (Ranger) 151st Infantry, and their predecessors as National Guard unit eligibility for regular membership.

On 5 July 2022, the House Armed Services Committee directed the Secretary of the Army to submit a report no later than 1 March 2023 on assessing the feasibility of establishing Ranger Battalion in the National Guard, which included the required resources and timeline for activating the unit. Additionally, the committee requested to assess the feasibility of the Army National Guard and the 75th Ranger Regiment for allowing physically and mentally qualified service members within the National Guard to apply for Ranger Assessment and Selection Program (RASP). The committee recognized that the National Guard currently maintains two Special Forces Groups as a relief for active component Special Forces. The idea for creation of a National Guard Ranger Battalion is intended to provide increased dwell times for the active 75th Ranger Regiment and enhance the readiness and capacity of the nation's premier light infantry unit. Discussions over the renewed concept have surged on public social media platforms and public US Army platforms since then.

National Guard Ranger Companies (1967–1987)
| Ranger Company | Home Station | Activated | Deactivated | Black Beret Flash | Lineage |
|---|---|---|---|---|---|
| Co E (Ranger) 151st Infantry | Muncie, Indiana | 1 Dec 1967 | 1 Mar 1971 | | Redesignated from Co A 1st 151st Infantry (Airborne) Consolidated with Co D (Ranger) 151st Infantry 7-157G TO&E and Ranger designation transferred to Co E (Ranger) 65th Infantry |
| Co E (Ranger) 425th Infantry | Pontiac, Michigan | 1 Feb 1968 | 1 Feb 1972 | | Redesignated from Co B 1st 225th Infantry (Airborne) Consolidated with Co F (Ranger) 425th Infantry 7-157G TO&E and Ranger designation transferred to Co A (Ranger) 259th Infantry |
| Co E (Ranger) 200th Infantry | Mobile, Alabama | 1 Dec 1969 | 1 Feb 1972 | Unknown | Converted from 778th Maint. Co (Lt Equip)(Direct Spt) Consolidated with Co A 1st 20th Special Forces Group |
| Co A (Ranger) 259th Infantry | New Castle, Delaware | 1 Nov 1971 | 1 Jun 1974 | | Converted from 1049th Trans Co (Acft Maint)(Gen Spt) Federal recognition withdrawn in 1974 |
| Co D (Ranger) 151st Infantry | Greenfield & Evansville, Indiana | 1 Dec 1967 | 1 Mar 1977 | | Consolidated from Co B & C 1st 151st Infantry (Airborne) Converted to Trp A 1st 238 CAV and Co C 2nd 151st Infantry. 1977-1986 Reorganized and redesignated to Trp F 1st 238th Cav (LRSU) 1986-89 as 50% transfers were from Trp A and incorporating a historical trace. Converted to 151st Infantry (LRSD) 1989-2007 Converted to Trp C 2nd 152nd Cavalry (LRS) 2007-2016 Converted to Co D 151st Infantry 2016-2019 Redesignated Co C 2nd 134th Infantry (Airborne) 2019–present |
| Co E (Ranger) 65th Infantry | Vega Baja (until '76) San Juan, Puerto Rico | 1 Apr 1971 | 29 Feb 1980 | | Converted from 755th Trans Co (Md Cgo Trk) Federal recognition withdrawn in 1980. 7-157H TO&E and Ranger designation transferred to Co G (Ranger) 143rd Infantry |
| Co F (Ranger) 425th Infantry | Detroit (until '72) Pontiac, Michigan | 1 Feb 1968 | 1 Sep 1987 | | Redesignated from Co C 1st 225th Infantry (Airborne) Reorganized to Co F 425th Infantry (LRRP) 1985-1987 Reorganized to Co F 425th Infantry (LRS), 1987-2011 Consolidated into Co A 1st 125th Infantry 2011–present |
| Co G (Ranger) 143rd Infantry | Houston & Austin, Texas | 1 Apr 1980 | 1 Sep 1987 | | Redesignated from Co A 2nd 143rd Infantry (Airborne) Reorganized to Co G 143rd Infantry (LRRP), 1987-1988 Reorganized to Co G 143rd Infantry (LRS), 1988-2001 Converted to Trp G 124th Cavalry (BRT) 2001-2008 Redesignated to Trp C (DRT) 1st 112th Cavalry (RSTA) 2008–present not to be confused with 143rd Infantry (LRSD) |

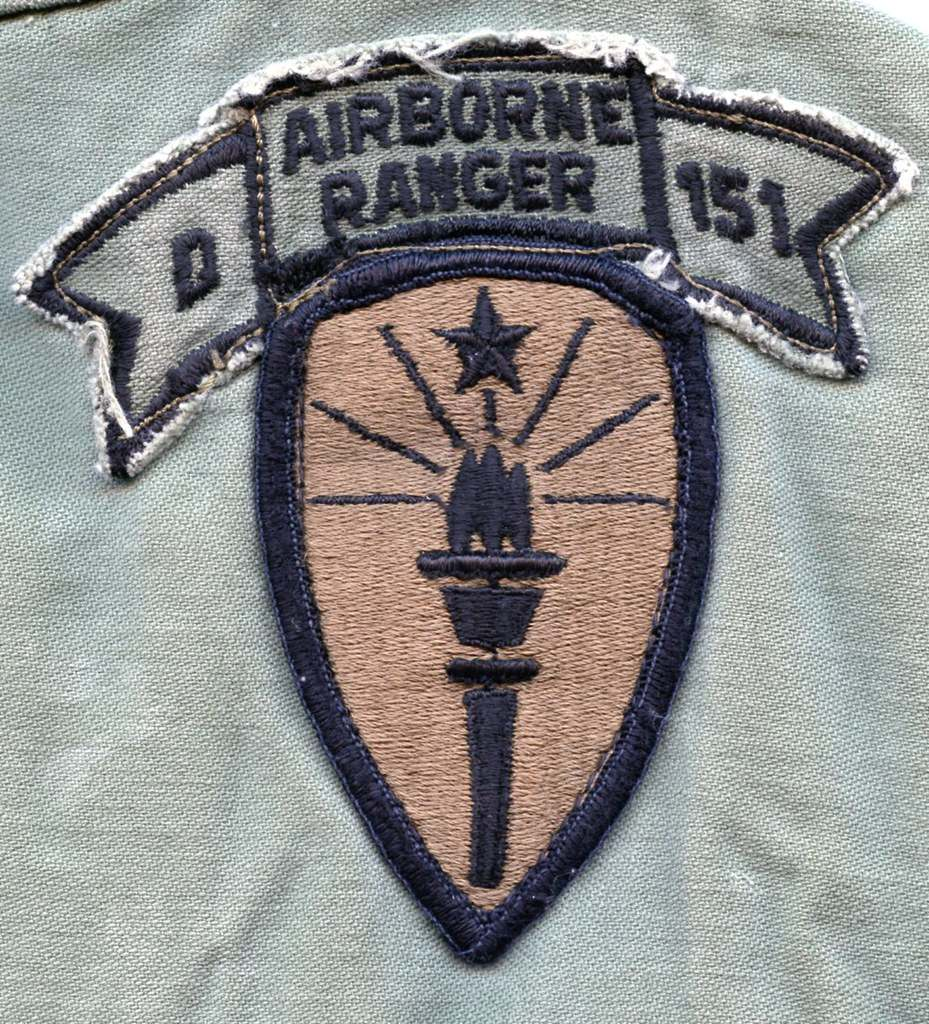
Ranger Company Scroll shoulder sleeve insignia (SSI) worn by the Rangers of D co (Ranger) 151st Infantry.

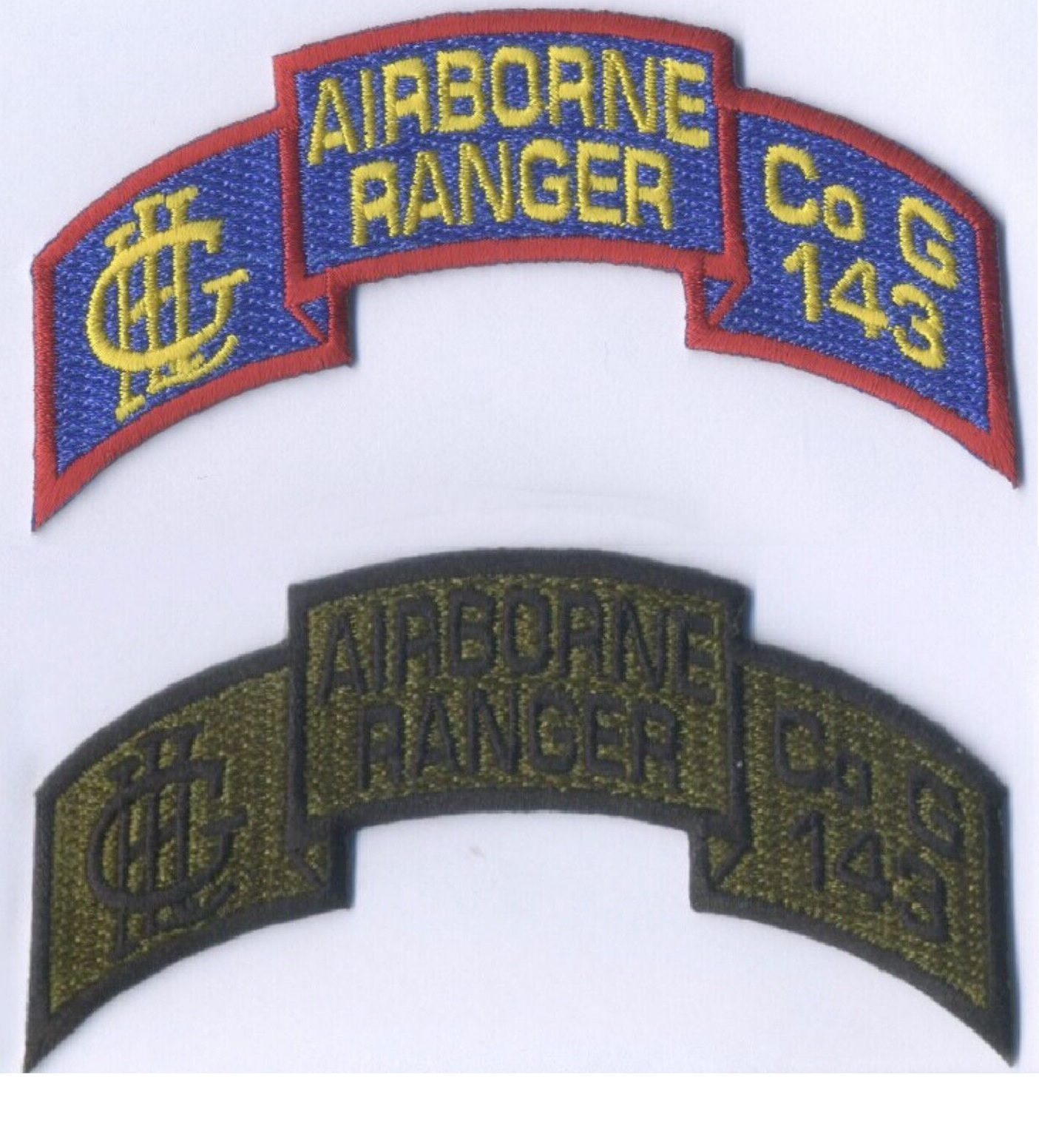
Ranger Company Scroll shoulder sleeve insignia (SSI) worn by the Rangers of G Co (Ranger) 143rd Infantry.

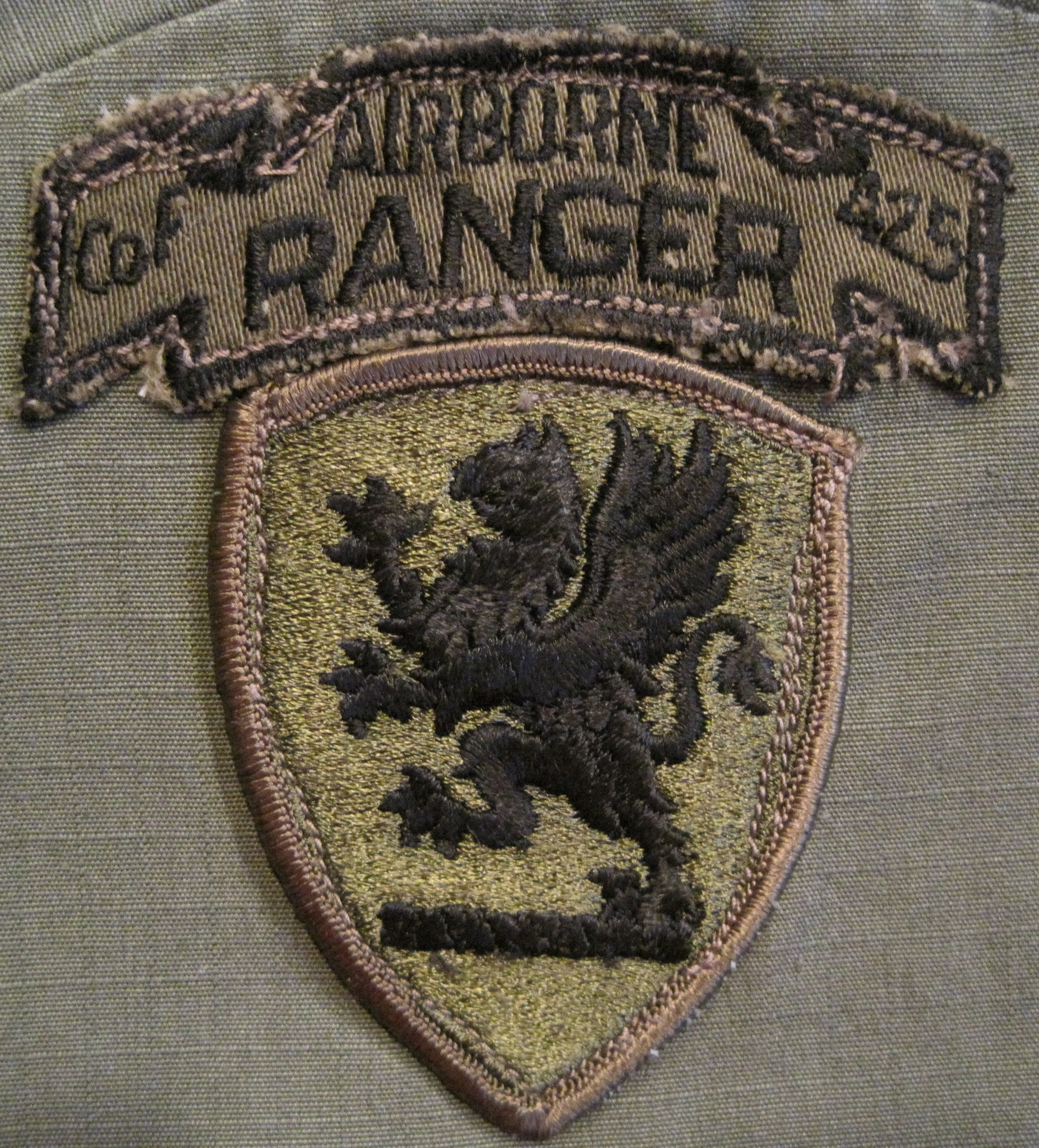
Ranger Company Scroll shoulder sleeve insignia (SSI) worn by the Rangers of F co (Ranger) 425th Infantry.

== Ranger School ==
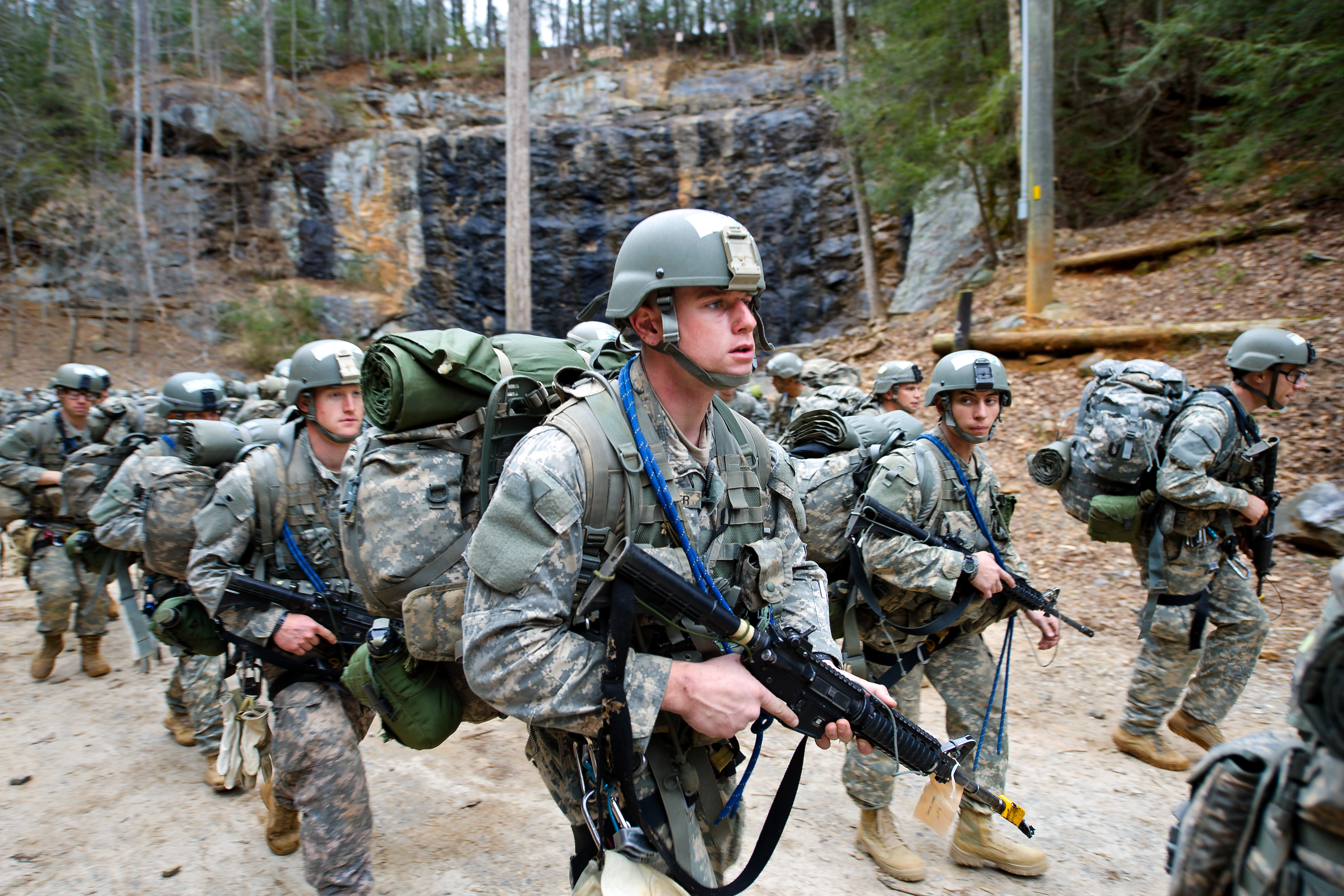
Ranger students move to the next phase of training following mountaineering exercises at Camp Frank D. Merrill, Georgia, February 2011

Ranger training began in September 1950 at Fort Benning, Georgia "with the formation and training of 17 Airborne Companies by the Ranger Training Command". The first class graduated from Ranger training in November 1950." The United States Army's Infantry School officially established the Ranger Department in December 1951. Under the Ranger Department, the first Ranger School Class was conducted in January–March 1952, with a graduation date of 1 March 1952. Its duration was 59 days. At the time, Ranger training was voluntary.

In 1966, a panel headed by General Ralph E. Haines, Jr. recommended making Ranger training mandatory for all Regular Army officers upon commissioning. "On 16 August 1966, the Chief of Staff of the Army, General Harold K. Johnson, directed it so." This policy was implemented in July 1967. It was rescinded on 21 June 1972 by General William Westmoreland. Once again, Ranger training was voluntary. In August 1987, the Ranger Department was split from the Infantry School and the Ranger Training Brigade was established, commanded by Brigadier General (R) James Emory Mace.

The Ranger Companies that made up the Ranger Department became the current training units—the 4th, 5th and 6th Ranger Training Battalions. These units conduct the United States Army's Ranger School at various locations: at Fort Benning, Georgia; at Camp Frank Merrill, near Dahlonega, Georgia; and at Camp James Rudder at Eglin Air Force Base's Auxiliary Field No. 6/Biancur Field, in northwest Florida. As of 2011, the school is 61 days in duration.

In August 2015, two women graduated from Ranger School; they were the "first females to successfully complete the notoriously gruelling program".

== Ranger Creed ==
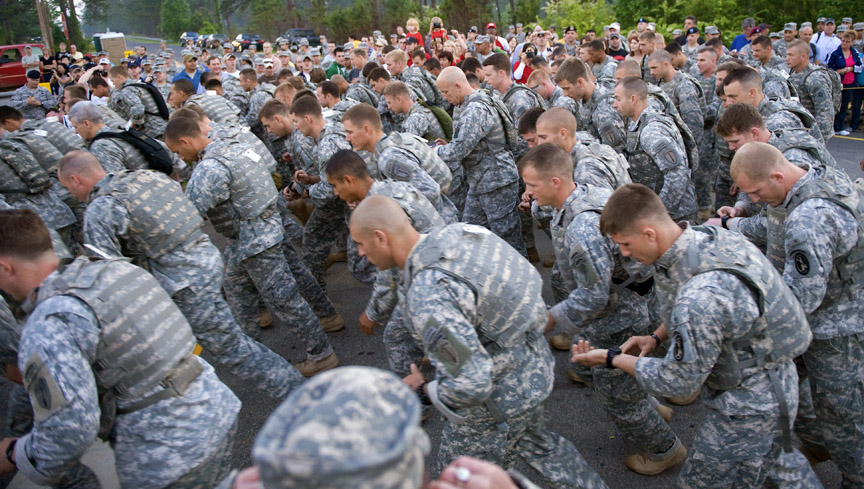
Eighty Rangers compete in the three-day 2010 Best Ranger Competition

Recognizing that I volunteered as a Ranger, fully knowing the hazards of my chosen profession, I will always endeavor to uphold the prestige, honor, and high esprit de corps of my Ranger Regiment. (Note: Ranger school students state of the Rangers, pre-1984/pre-regimental HQ Rangers state of my Ranger Battalion, and National Guard Ranger companies state of my Ranger company.)

Acknowledging the fact that a Ranger is a more elite soldier who arrives at the cutting edge of battle by land, sea, or air, I accept the fact that as a Ranger my country expects me to move further, faster, and fight harder than any other soldier.

Never shall I fail my comrades. I will always keep myself mentally alert, physically strong, and morally straight and I will shoulder more than my share of the task whatever it may be, one hundred percent and then some.

Gallantly will I show the world that I am a specially selected and well trained soldier. My courtesy to superior officers, neatness of dress, and care of equipment shall set the example for others to follow.

Energetically will I meet the enemies of my country. I shall defeat them on the field of battle for I am better trained and will fight with all my might. Surrender is not a Ranger word. I will never leave a fallen comrade to fall into the hands of the enemy and under no circumstances will I ever embarrass my country.

Readily will I display the intestinal fortitude required to fight on to the Ranger objective and complete the mission, though I be the lone survivor.

Rangers, lead the way.

== "Ranger" terminology ==
Organizations both use and define the term "Ranger" in different ways. For example, the annual Best Ranger Competition, hosted by the Ranger Training Brigade, the title "Best Ranger" can be won by any Ranger qualified entrants from any unit in the U.S. military. For an individual to be inducted into the U.S. Army Ranger Association's "Ranger Hall of Fame" they "must have served in a Ranger unit in combat or be a successful graduate of the U.S. Army Ranger School." The Ranger Association further clarifies the type of unit: "A Ranger unit is defined as those Army units recognized in Ranger lineage or history." Acceptance into the U.S. Army Ranger Association is limited to "Rangers that have earned the U.S. Army Ranger tab, WWII Rangers, Korean War Rangers, Vietnam War Rangers, all Rangers that participated in Operations Urgent Fury, Just Cause, Desert Storm, Restore Hope, Enduring Freedom, and all Rangers who have served honorably for at least one year in a recognized Ranger unit."

== Ranger Hall of Honor ==
The U.S. Army Ranger Hall of Honor was established in 1952. It is hosted at the National Infantry Museum in Columbus, Georgia, which also hosts the U.S. Army Officer Candidate School Hall of Honor.

The Ranger of Hall of Fame features a digital kiosk with over 200 biographies and portraits of inductees.

== Notable Rangers ==
=== Colonial period ===
- Benjamin Church
- John Gorham
- Joseph Gorham
- John Lovewell
- Robert Rogers
- Josiah Standish
- John Stark – Commander, First New Hampshire Militia; coined phrase "Live Free or Die"

=== American Revolution ===
- George Rogers Clark – led an irregular force of Kentucky/Virginia militiamen to capture the British forts at Vincennes, Indiana and Kaskaskia, Illinois.
- Thomas Knowlton – commander of Knowlton's Rangers; early American intelligence agent; the MICA Knowlton Award is named in his honor
- Francis Marion – the "Swamp Fox" during the American Revolution; credited in the lineage of the United States Army Rangers; recognized as one of the fathers of modern guerrilla warfare
- Daniel Morgan – commander of the 11th Virginia Regiment, later called the Corps of Rangers and "Morgan's Sharpshooters", during the American Revolution
- Israel Putnam – Major General in the Continental Army

=== War of 1812 ===
- Daniel Appling – a Key Subordinate Commander of the American Regiment of Riflemen
- Joseph Bartholomew – a major general who served with the Indiana Rangers
- Nathan Boone – was a captain of a company of United States Rangers in the War of 1812
- Benjamin Forsyth – a key subordinate commander of the American Regiment of Riflemen
- John Tipton – an officer with the Indiana Rangers, went on to become a brigadier general and then a U.S. Senator
- Bennet C. Riley – a second lieutenant of the American Regiment of Riflemen.
- Thomas Adams Smith – a commander of the American Regiment of Riflemen.

=== World War II to present ===
- John Abizaid – former Commander, United States Central Command, 2003–2007
- David Barno – former Commander, Combined Forces Command-Afghanistan; former commander of 2nd Ranger Battalion
- Charles Alvin Beckwith – Ranger-qualified Airborne Infantry and Special Forces officer, the creator and first commanding officer of Delta Force; helped shape the modern Ranger School, transforming the Florida phase from a WW2-era to a modern-era training regimen
- Christopher A. Celiz, Medal of Honor recipient, served in the 1st Ranger Battalion
- Wesley Clark – former Supreme Allied Commander in Europe; Democratic presidential candidate
- Richard D. Clarke, commander of USSOCOM from 2019 until 2022. Clarke previously served as a company commander from 1994 to 1996, then as a battalion commander from 2004 to 2006 and regimental commander from 2007 to 2009 in the 75th Ranger Regiment.
- William Orlando Darby – established and commanded "Darby's Rangers" that later evolved into the U.S. Army Rangers
- Wayne A. Downing
- Jason Everman – former member of the bands Nirvana and Soundgarden
- David Goggins, former Navy SEAL, ultramarathon runner, ultra-distance cyclist, triathlete, motivational speaker, and author. Graduated from Army Ranger School with the distinction of enlisted "Top Honor Man."
- Gary Gordon, served with the 10th Special Forces Group and later in Delta Force as a sniper. He, along with SFC Randy Shughart were the first two post-Vietnam War servicemembers to receive the Medal of Honor for their actions during the Battle of Mogadishu.
- David E. Grange Jr. – namesake of the annual "Best Ranger Competition"
- David L. Grange – former commander of Delta Force and the son of retired lieutenant general David E. Grange Jr.
- Kristen Marie Griest – one of the two first women to graduate from U.S. Army Ranger School
- Gary L. Harrell – former commander of Delta Force and served during the Battle of Mogadishu.
- Shaye Lynne Haver – one of the two first women to graduate from U.S. Army Ranger School
- Charles N. Hunter – member of Unit Galahad, Merrill's Marauders, from the beginning as its ranking or second-ranking officer; commanded it during its times of greatest trial, and contributed to its record
- Nicholas Irving – former sniper in the 3rd Ranger Battalion; served in Iraq and Afghanistan; noted for killing 33 enemy combatants in four months
- Lisa Jaster, the first female army reserve soldier to graduate from Ranger School.
- James Earl Jones, actor, served as an officer in the Rangers 1953–1955.
- Peter Kassig – aid worker, taken hostage and ultimately beheaded by the Islamic State
- William F. Kernan – 6th Colonel of the 75th Ranger Regiment
- Kris Kristofferson – former Army Ranger; singer/songwriter; actor
- Paul LaCamera – Commander, 4th Infantry Division; former Commander, 75th Ranger Regiment (2005–2007)
- Robert D. Law – served in the Vietnam War, Medal of Honor recipient (posthumous)
- Gary L. Littrell – Medal of Honor recipient
- Leonard Lomell – Received the Distinguished Service Cross for action on D-Day at Pointe du Hoc, and the Silver Star for action on Hill 400 during the Battle of Hürtgen Forest, in WWII.
- Stanley A. McChrystal – former Commander, International Security Assistance Force (ISAF) and U.S. Forces Afghanistan (USFOR-A); former Director of the Joint Staff; former Commander of Joint Special Operations Command (JSOC)
- Danny McKnight – served as commander of the 3rd Battalion, 75th Ranger Regiment during the Battle of Mogadishu.
- Richard J. Meadows, Distinguished Service Cross recipient. A ranger-qualified Special Forces officer who was a pivotal player in the creation of the modern U.S. Army Special Forces.
- Frank D. Merrill – led the 5307th CUP (Composite Unit [Provisional]) aka Merrill's Marauders during World War II
- Mark Milley – former Chairman of the Joint Chiefs of Staff who had previously served as the 39th Chief of Staff of the United States Army.
- Henry Mucci – led and trained the 6th Ranger Battalion, responsible for the Raid at Cabanatuan
- Robert S. Mueller III, Second-longest serving FBI director in American history and Special Counsel in the investigation into Russian interference in the 2016 United States elections; inducted into the Ranger Hall of Fame in 2016.
- Thomas Payne, a member of Delta Force and the first Medal of Honor recipient against the battle with ISIL. Thomas is also the first living Delta Force operator to be awarded the Medal of Honor, and the third overall Delta operator, with the first two being MSG Gary Gordon and SFC Randy Shughart. Payne with his partner MSG Kevin Foutz, also won the Best Ranger Competition in 2012.
- Kelly Perdew – winner of the second season of The Apprentice
- David Petraeus – Commander of International Security Assistance Force ISAF; former Commander of CENTCOM; former commander of Multi-National Force – Iraq; former Director of the CIA
- Leroy Petry – Army Ranger, 75th Regiment; Medal of Honor recipient
- Greg Plitt – fitness model and actor
- Colin Powell – former National Security Adviser; Commander, United States Army Forces Command; Chairman of the Joint Chiefs of Staff; United States Secretary of State
- Robert Pruden – served in the Vietnam War; Medal of Honor recipient (posthumous)
- Ralph Puckett – Honorary Colonel of the 75th Ranger Regiment, 1996–2008
- Laszlo Rabel – served in the Vietnam War, Medal of Honor recipient (posthumous)
- Jack Reed – U.S. Senator from Rhode Island
- David Richardson – Ranger who served with Merrill's Marauders; led a prominent career as a journalist
- John W. Ripley – first U.S. Marine to be inducted into the Ranger Hall of Fame; awarded the Navy Cross for extraordinary heroism in destroying the Dong Ha bridge during the April 1972 North Vietnamese Easter Offensive
- J Robinson, 4-time national wrestling champion, member of the US Olympic team, head coach of the Minnesota Golden Gophers wrestling team.
- James Earl Rudder – Commander of the 2nd Ranger Battalion during World War II; later president of Texas A&M University; led the Ranger assault on Pointe du Hoc on D-Day
- Perry Saturn – professional wrestler; real name Perry Satullo
- Nate Self – former captain, and Silver Star recipient. Self also served in the Battle of Takur Ghar.
- Randy Shughart – started his Army career as a Ranger; later selected for Delta Force; Medal of Honor recipient sniper; killed during the Battle of Mogadishu
- Arthur D. Simons – Army Ranger in World War II; later leader of Operation Ivory Coast, an effort to rescue prisoners of war in Vietnam
- Michael D. Steele – served as the commander of B Company, 3rd Battalion, 75th Ranger Regiment, during the Battle of Mogadishu.
- Jeff Struecker, served in the Battle of Mogadishu as part of Task Force Ranger. He and his partner, SPC Isaac Gmazel won the Best Ranger Competition in 1996.
- Phil Stern – Hollywood and jazz photographer who joined Darby's Rangers as an official photographer during World War II
- Keni Thomas – former Army Ranger; country music singer
- Pat Tillman – American football player who left his professional career in the wake of the September 11 attacks; killed in action in a friendly fire incident in Afghanistan.
- Stephen Trujillo – 2d Ranger Battalion medic awarded the first Silver Star of the post-Vietnam era for gallantry in action during Operation Urgent Fury
- Alejandro Villanueva – NFL player for the Baltimore Ravens; served in the 1st Ranger Battalion in Afghanistan
- Vincent Viola – former chairman of the New York Mercantile Exchange
- Samuel V. Wilson – Chief Reconnaissance Officer and Intelligence & Reconnaissance Platoon Leader, 5307th Composite Unit (Provisional) (Merrill's Marauders); ultimately served as the Director, Defense Intelligence Agency (DIA) before retiring as a Lieutenant General in 1977.
- Joshua Wheeler, Silver Star recipient. Former member of Delta Force. He was the first American service member killed in action as a result of enemy fire while fighting ISIS militants. He was also the first American to be killed in action in Iraq since November 2011.
- John Whitley, Acting US Secretary of the Army

== Honors ==
75th Ranger Regiment Distinctive Unit Insignia

The 75th Ranger Regiment has been credited with numerous campaigns from World War II onwards. In World War II, they participated in 16 major campaigns, spearheading the campaigns in French Morocco, Sicily, Naples-Foggia, Anzio and Leyte. During the Vietnam War, they received campaign participation streamers for every campaign in the war.

In modern times, the regiment received streamers with arrowheads (denoting conflicts they spearheaded) for Grenada and Panama.

The Rangers have earned six Presidential Unit Citations, nine Valorous Unit Awards, and four Meritorious Unit Commendations, the most recent of which were earned in Vietnam and Haditha, Iraq.

Rangers of D co 151st Infantry, Indiana National Guard were decorated 538 times in Vietnam. They received 19 Silver Stars, 88 Bronze Stars w V device, 123 Bronze Stars for service, 1 Soldiers Medal, 101 Purple Hearts, 111 Air Medal, 29 Army Commendation Medals with V device, and 3 campaign streamers during the 11-month deployment to South Vietnam in 1969. No other single Army Infantry company was as decorated during a one-year period throughout the entire Vietnam war than the "Indiana Rangers".

== See also ==
- The Queen's York Rangers (1st American Regiment) (RCAC)
- Company E, 52nd Infantry (LRP) / H Co. 75th Infantry (Ranger)
- Fictional United States Army Rangers personnel
- Long-range penetration
- Long-range surveillance
- Recondo
- Ranger (disambiguation)
