= Company F, 425th Infantry =

Unit of the Michigan National Guard

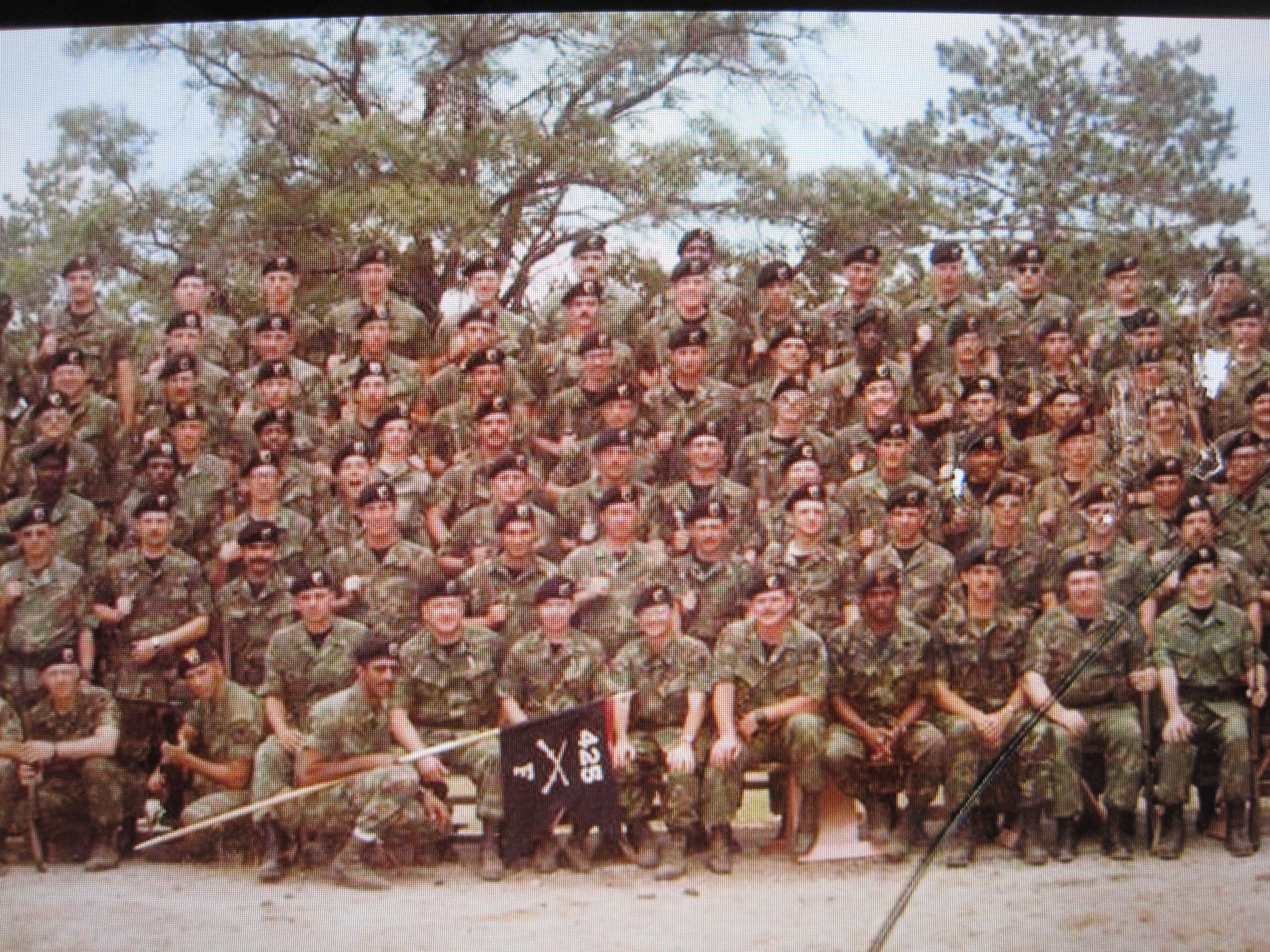
Company F (Ranger), Long Range Surveillance, 425th Infantry

Company F, 425th Infantry was a long range surveillance unit of the Michigan National Guard that was inactivated on 12 June 2011. The company came into being in the mid-1960s when the 1st Battalion (Airborne), 225th Infantry was reflagged as Companies E and F (Ranger), 425th Infantry, and organized as Ranger companies. During this period these two companies were assigned to division and higher level commands to perform long range reconnaissance patrol missions, as opposed to the Ranger companies of today which comprise the five battalions (this includes the Special Troops Battalion) of the 75th Ranger Regiment. According to the United States Army Center of Military History, it was reorganized and redesignated as the 425th Infantry Detachment (LRS) effective 1 September 2008 and was relocated from the State of Michigan Pontiac Armory to the Selfridge Air National Guard Base near Mount Clemens, 15 miles northeast of Detroit.

== History ==
At the conclusion of World War II the 125th Infantry Regiment, Michigan National Guard, returned to Detroit. A reorganization of the National Guard followed and the Detroit unit was redesignated the 425th Infantry Regiment. Regimental elements reorganized 1 September 1972 and Company E was redesignated Company F, 425th Infantry (Ranger).

== Organization ==
Company F consisted of a large company headquarters and operations section, three patrol platoons, a communications platoon, and a parachute rigger section. Each patrol platoon consisted of a platoon headquarters and, at full strength, six 6-man patrol teams. Company F was historically an independent company within the Michigan National Guard, but for a period during the Cold War beginning in 1983, the company was aligned with VII Corps Headquarters in Stuttgart, West Germany, where it would deploy and serve as the corps Long Range Surveillance unit in the event of a NATO-Soviet conflict in Europe. Members of Company F held military occupational specialties (MOS) in the branches Infantry, Quartermaster Corps (Parachute Rigger 92R), Signal Corps and Military Intelligence. Since it was an airborne unit, members were required to attend the Army's Basic Airborne Course at Fort Benning, GA.

== Equipment ==
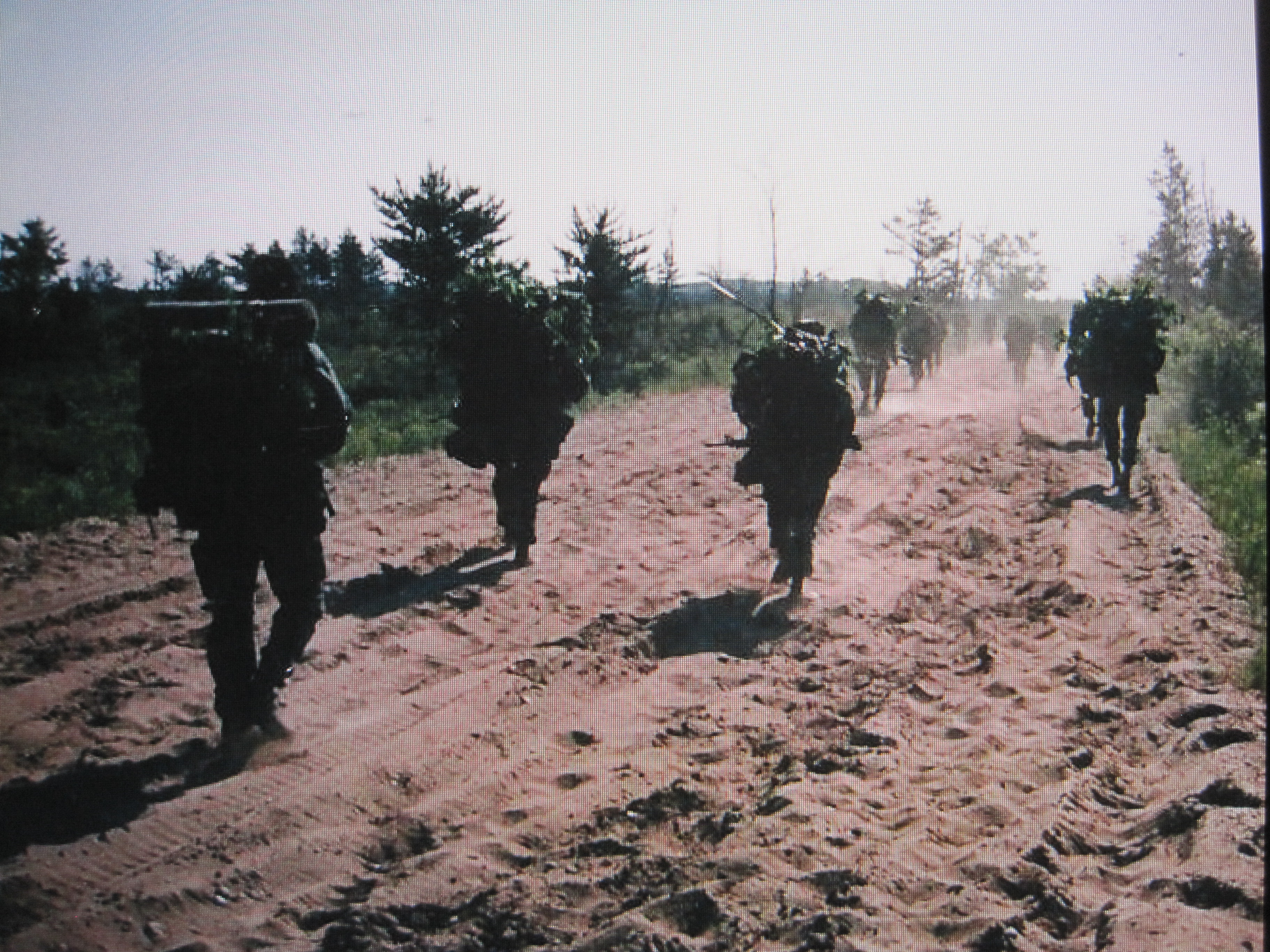
Co.F troops at Camp Grayling, MI

Throughout the Cold War, many National Guard and Reserve forces were poorly equipped in comparison to the active component, however, Company F, given its importance as a long-range reconnaissance/Ranger unit was much better equipped than most. It was one of the first National Guard units to receive M16 rifles and M1956 equipment even before some active units. The unit was also historically equipped with the most modern communications equipment. As an airborne unit, Company F made use of T-10 static-line parachutes which is primarily used for jumps by the active military, allied military forces, as well as the Michigan Army and Air National Guard from UH-60 Blackhawks, CH-47 Chinooks, and C-130 Hercules transports. In the past, the unit also jumped from such aircraft such as the UH-1 Iroquois (Huey), C-123 Provider and the C-119 Flying Boxcar. It later transitioned to the MC1-1B and C parachute. In recent years the unit was equipped with the following weapons: the 5.56mm M4 carbine, the 5.56mm M249 Squad Automatic Weapon, the 40mm M203 grenade launcher, and the 9mm M9 pistol, consistent with active combat arms units of the U.S. Army.

== Installations ==
Company F trained at the Selfridge Air National Guard Base Mount Clemens, MI; Fort Custer Training Center near Kalamazoo, MI; Camp Grayling MI; Puerto Rico; and has historically been headquartered at the Pontiac Armory in Pontiac, MI.

== Deployments and Civil Actions ==
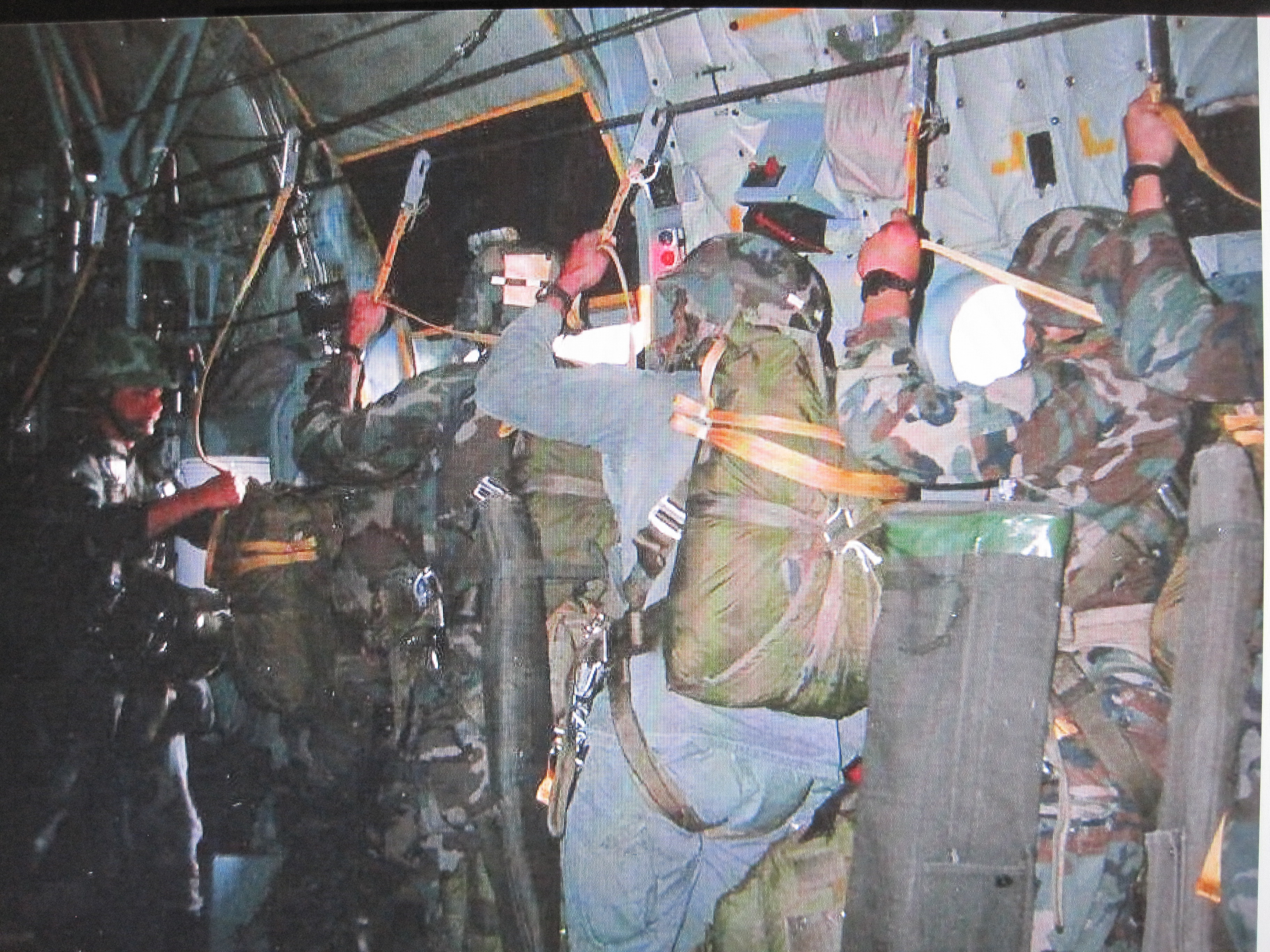
Co.F troops with full equipment exiting a C-130 Hercules

Company F's first action was as part of the National Guard force brought to Highland Park to quell the Detroit riot of 1968, and performed its duties without casualties. This is not to be confused with the much more serious 1967 Detroit riot in which the 1st Battalion (Airborne), 225th Infantry participated. Unlike Company D (Ranger), 151st Infantry, Indiana ARNG, Company F never deployed to Vietnam, but saw many training deployments during the period to locations including Puerto Rico and other stateside military installations. The company also participated in several REFORGER exercises in the 1980s. The unit won the Rhode Island International Parachute Competition 1st Place Team Trophy twice, in 1983 and 1987. In 1987, Airborne and Ranger-qualified personnel from Company F deployed to the United Kingdom and jointly trained with 21 Special Air Services (SAS). Company F was the first Army National Guard company ever to deploy from the US and jump into a simulated combat scenario in Puerto Rico.

After the 9/11 attacks, several members of Company F were mobilized as a vanguard for the unit and were deployed to Iraq during the first phase of Operation Iraqi Freedom. They were designated as Company F, 250th MI Battalion and attached to Company H (LRS), 121st Infantry, Georgia ARNG. Company F was mobilized on 7 December 2003 and deployed to Iraq from February 2004 to February 2005, where it performed security operations, foreign internal defense training as well as normal LRS missions. Though several members were wounded through enemy action and received Purple Heart medals, Company F returned to Michigan with all soldiers that deployed a year earlier. Following its deployment, Company F continued training with the benefit of combat experience as a result of its one-year tour of duty in Iraq.

2nd Iraq deployment

Company F was mobilized again on 9 May 2009 and deployed to Iraq from July 2009 to May 2010.

== 425th Regimental Association ==
The Association was formed and made official on 12 January 2002, with the adoption of its By-Laws. LTC Robert Wangen had proposed creating the Association and was elected as its first President.

The mission of the 425th Regimental Association is to perpetuate the history, lineage and honors of Company F (RANGER), 425th Infantry as well as to look out for the welfare of our Company F members, past and present. Membership in the Association is open to anyone who served in Company F (LRRP/Ranger/LRS) 425th Infantry. The Association website is www.425regiment.org.

The Association has published and in-depth history of Company F and it is available through Amazon.com. Search for "Around the World Unseen"

== Insignia ==
Beret flashes worn by the 425th Infantry Regiment's ranger and surveillance companies

425th Infantry, Company E and F (Ranger) Beret Flash

Ranger Dept. Beret Flash, worn by Company E and F in the late 1970s

425th Infantry, Company F (LRS) Beret Flash

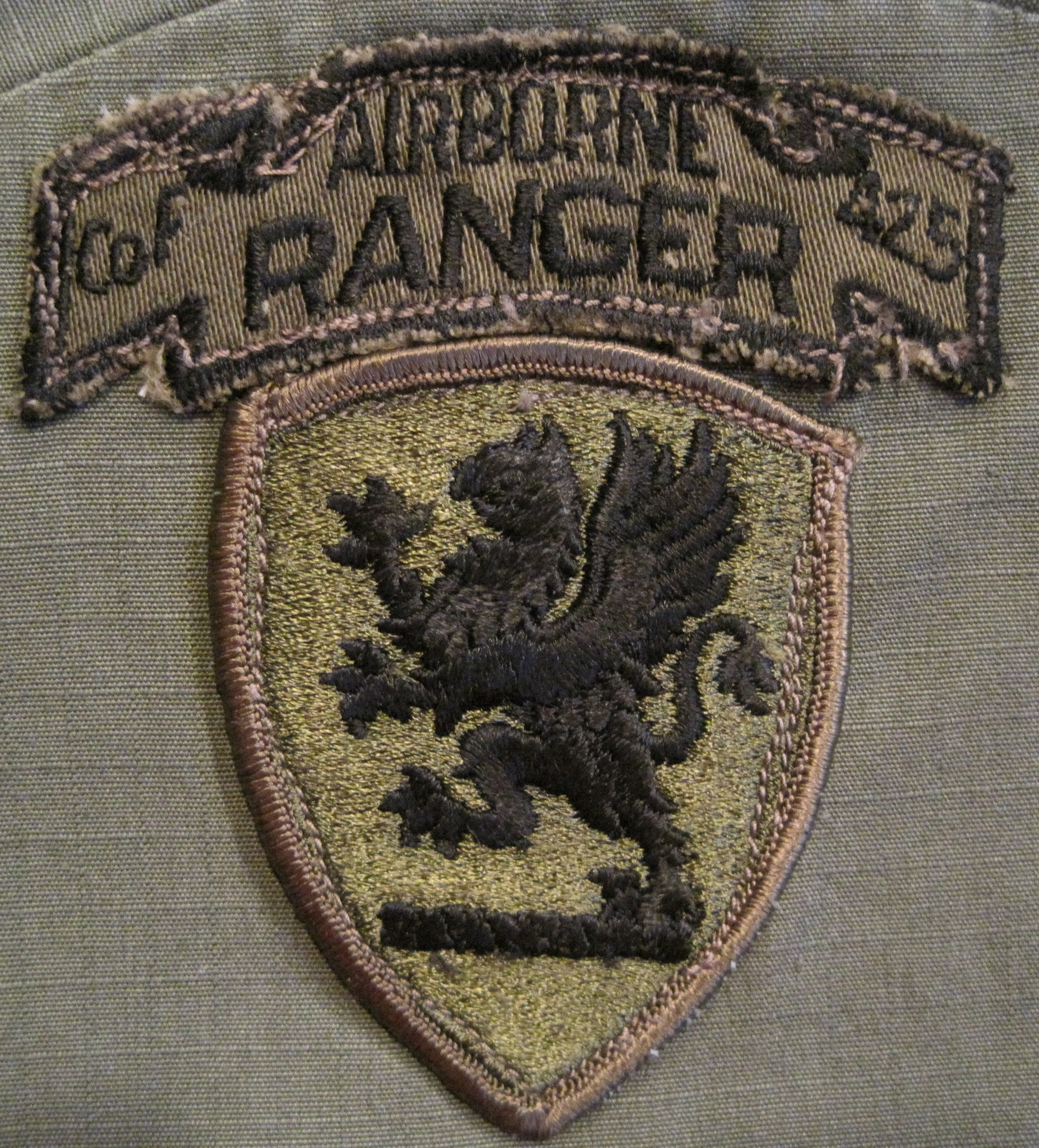
Michigan National Guard griffin patch and 425th Airborne Ranger scroll

Company F, 425th Infantry (LRS) wore the distinctive airborne tab above the griffin patch of the Michigan Army National Guard, distinguishing it as an airborne unit. Previously the unit had worn the Airborne Tab above the shoulder patch of the 201st Military Intelligence Brigade. Before being reflagged as a Long Range Surveillance Company, members of Company F wore a ranger scroll with "AIRBORNE RANGER" in lieu of the common Airborne Tab above the griffin patch and the black beret with distinctive organizational beret flash which identified them as Rangers. Upon designation as members of a LRS unit, soldiers of Company F switched to the maroon beret, the distinguishing feature of members of an airborne unit.

== In popular culture ==
In the 2025 film Mission: Impossible – The Final Reckoning a briefly seen on screen document shows that the character Ethan Hunt served in Company F, 425th Infantry. This highlights how creators often draw from the history of real-life elite units to build authentic and compelling characters. The choice to place Ethan Hunt in Company F, 425th Infantry, a real Long Range Surveillance Unit with a history in Cold War Europe, was a deliberate detail to ground his extraordinary skills in a plausible military background.

While the Mission: Impossible film franchise is directly based on Bruce Geller's 1960s television series, there was a real-world inspiration and former unit member and his subsequent service that offers a perspective on the character's origins. This connection makes Hunt's service record, as seen in the document, more than just fictional trivia—it links it to the experiences of an actual soldier who served in that capacity.

== See also ==
- Long Range Reconnaissance Patrol
- Long Range Surveillance Detachment
- United States Army Rangers
- United States Army Reconnaissance and Surveillance Leaders Course
