= Jeff Struecker =

American soldier, pastor and author (born 1969)

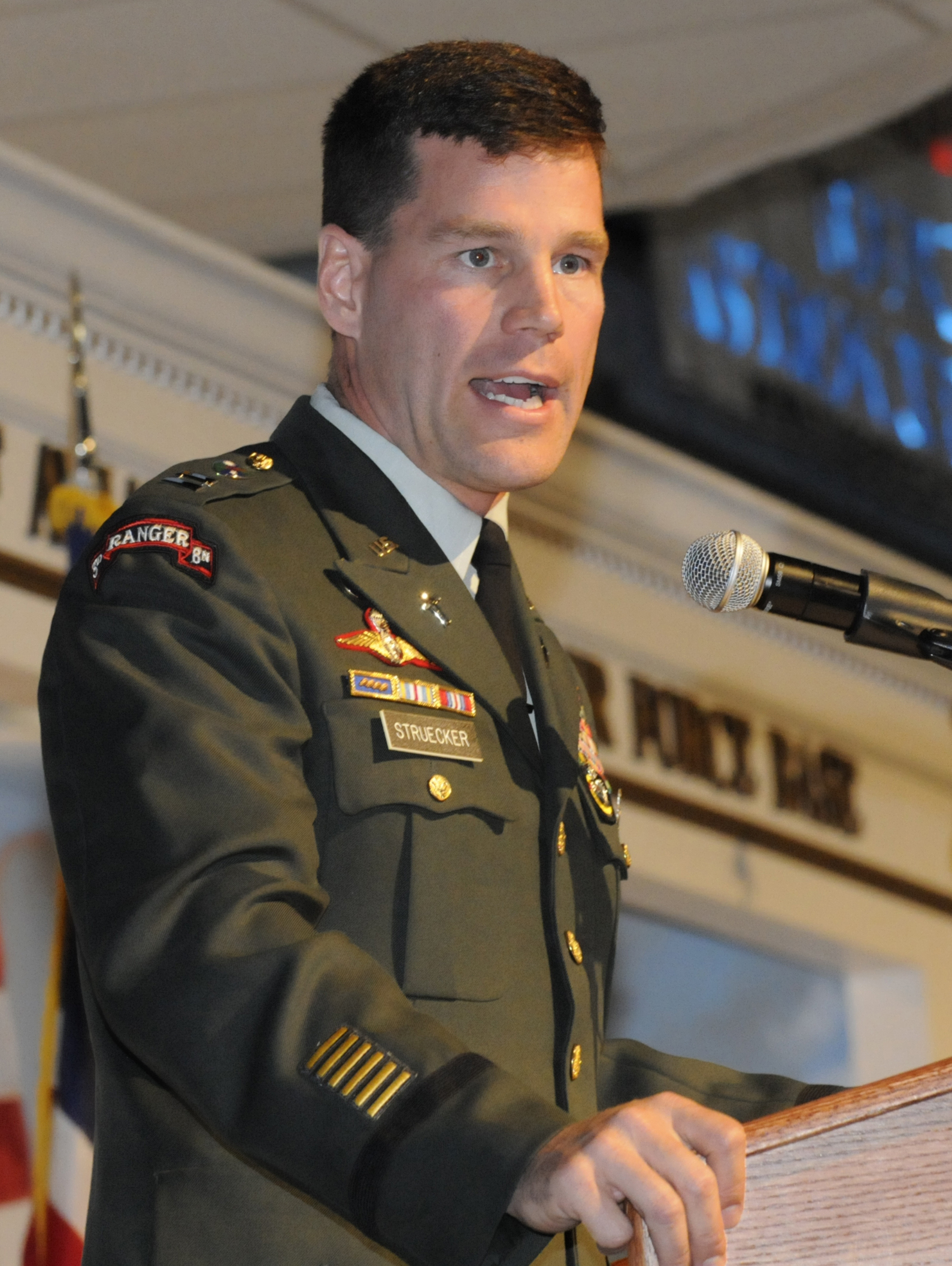
- Struecker in 2009
- Born: March 7, 1969 (age 57); Fort Dodge, Iowa, U.S.
- Alma mater: Troy State University (BSc); Southern Baptist Theological Seminary (MDiv); Southeastern Baptist Theological Seminary (PhD)
- Military career
- Allegiance: United States
- Branch: United States Army
- Service years: 1987–2011
- Rank: Major
- Units: 3d Battalion, 75th Ranger Regiment
- Conflicts: Operation Just Cause; Gulf War; Operation Gothic Serpent; Iraq War; War in Afghanistan
- Awards: Silver Star Medal; Bronze Star Medal (3)

Jeffery Dean Struecker (born March 7, 1969) is an American author, pastor, and former United States Army Ranger who was involved in the Battle of Mogadishu in 1993. He also participated in the 1989 invasion of Panama (Operation Just Cause) and in Kuwait during Operation Desert Storm. Struecker has co-authored five published books. Struecker was portrayed by Brian Van Holt in the 2001 film Black Hawk Down. In 2017, he was inducted into the Army Ranger Hall of Fame.

== Enlisted service ==
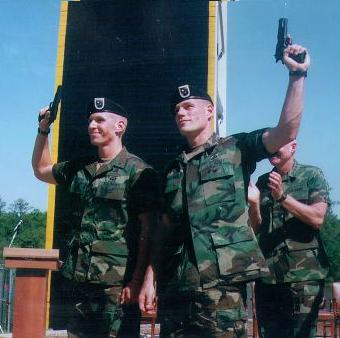
SPC Isaac Gmazel and SSG Jeff Struecker upon winning the 1996 Best Ranger Competition at Fort Benning, Georgia.

Enlisted in the United States Army in September 1987 at the age of 18, Struecker served ten years in the 75th Ranger Regiment in positions ranging from Ranger Reconnaissance specialist to platoon sergeant. He would go on to win the Best Ranger Competition in 1996 with partner SPC Isaac Gmazel.

Struecker was also recognized in 1998 with the United States Army Reserve Officers' Training Corps (ROTC) Noncommissioned Officer of the Year.

=== Battle of Mogadishu ===
In the 1993 Battle of Mogadishu, Struecker was a 24-year-old sergeant and squad leader assigned to Task Force Ranger as a part of the 75th Ranger Regiment. He led the 3-vehicle convoy that returned, through intense fire, wounded Ranger Private Todd Blackburn to base. Struecker was awarded the Silver Star for his actions in Mogadishu.

In the film based on the battle, Black Hawk Down, Struecker is portrayed by Brian Van Holt.

== Commissioned service ==
After his enlisted service ended in April 2000, Struecker went on to graduate from seminary and became commissioned as a chaplain. As chaplain, Struecker served multiple tours in Operation Enduring Freedom in Afghanistan and Operation Iraqi Freedom in Iraq. Struecker's final military assignment was chaplain with the Regimental Special Troops Battalion of the 75th Ranger Regiment. Struecker retired from active military service at the end of January 2011.

== Awards and decorations ==

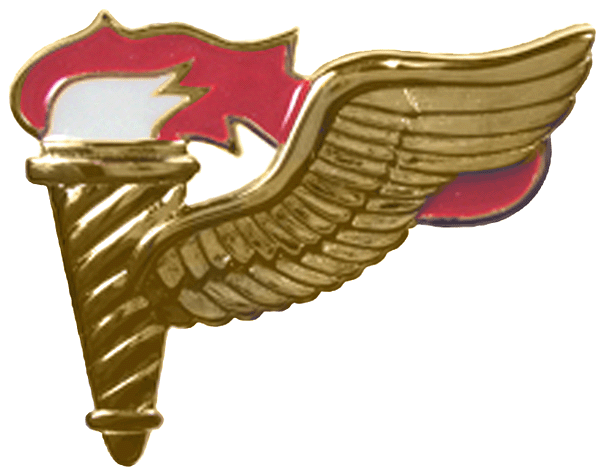

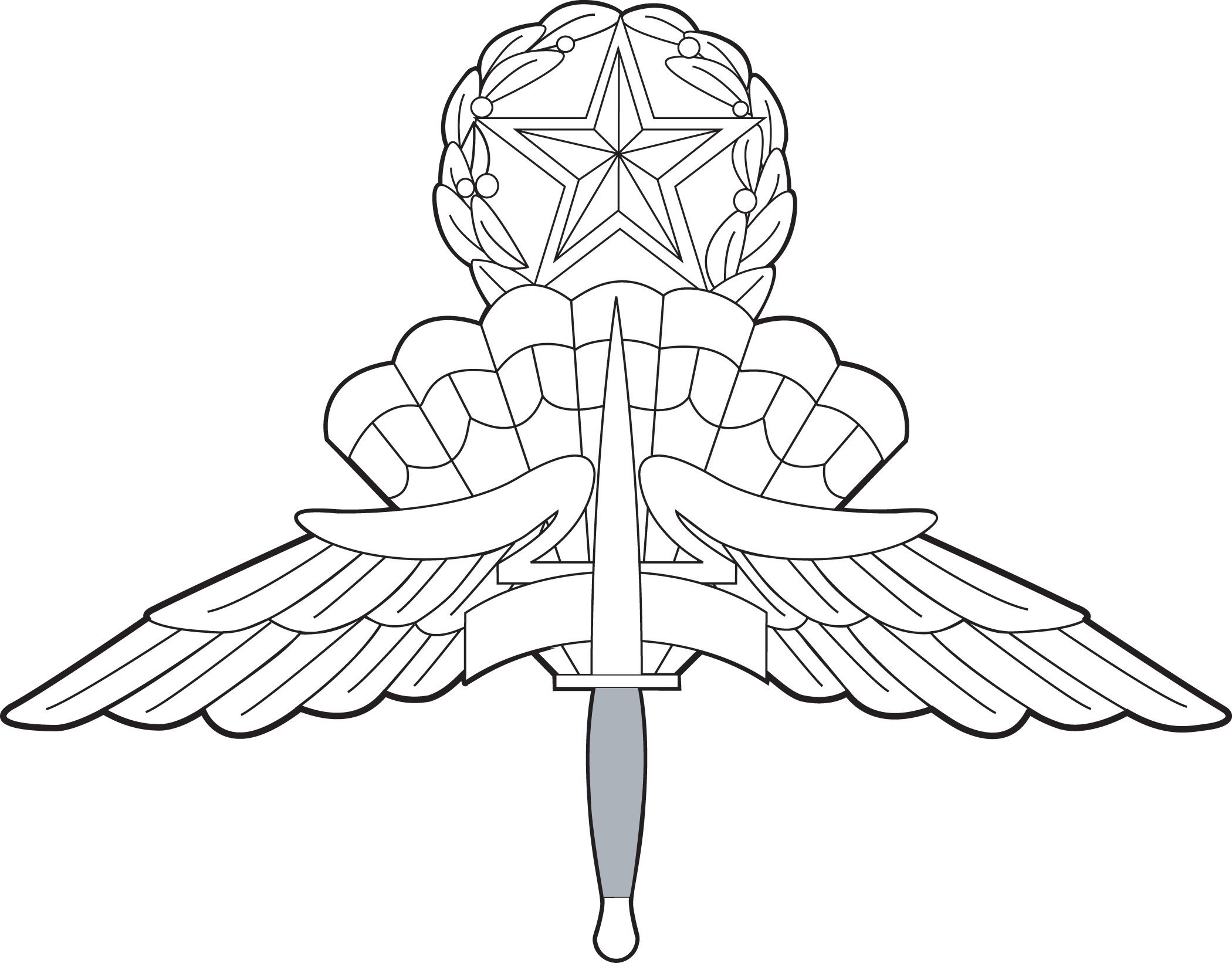

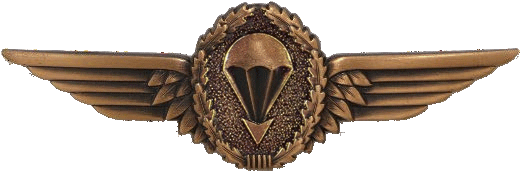

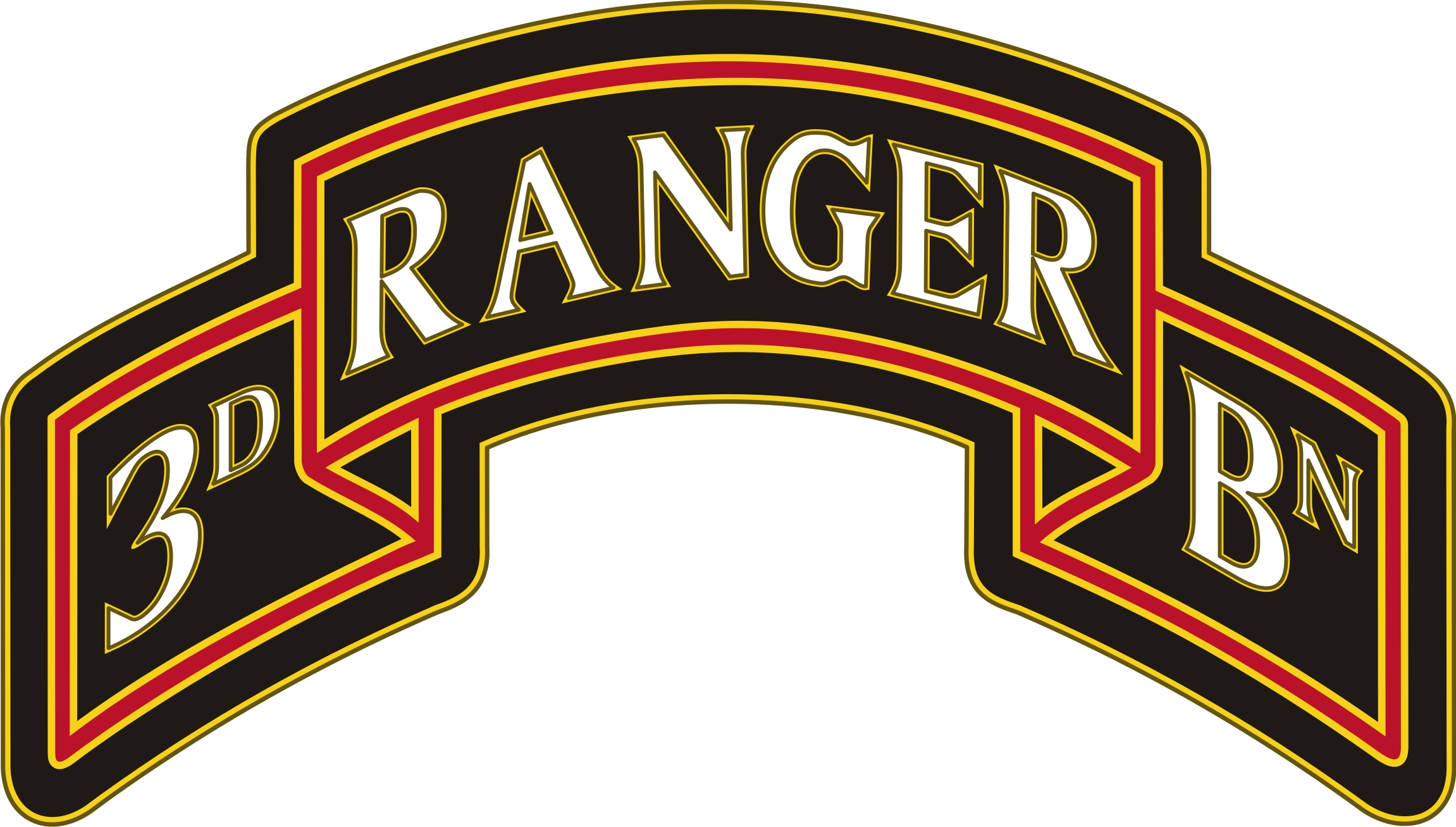

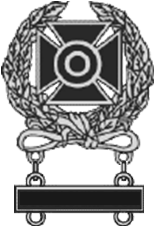

Badges	Combat Infantryman Badge	Combat Action Badge	Master Parachutist Badge
Badges	Ranger Tab	Pathfinder Badge	Master Military Freefall Parachutist Badge
1st Row	Silver Star Medal		
2nd Row	Bronze Star Medal with "V" device and 2 Oak leaf clusters	Meritorious Service Medal with 1 silver and 1 bronze Oak leaf clusters	Joint Service Commendation Medal
3rd Row	Army Commendation Medal with 1 Oak leaf cluster	Joint Service Achievement Medal	Army Achievement Medal with 3 Oak leaf clusters
4th Row	Army Good Conduct Medal with bronze clasp and 4 loops (4 awards)	National Defense Service Medal with 1 Service star	Armed Forces Expeditionary Medal with 1 Campaign star
5th Row	Southwest Asia Service Medal with 1 Campaign star	Afghanistan Campaign Medal with 2 Campaign stars	Iraq Campaign Medal with 4 Campaign stars
6th Row	Global War on Terrorism Expeditionary Medal	Global War on Terrorism Service Medal	NCO Professional Development Ribbon with award numeral 3
7th Row	Army Service Ribbon	Army Overseas Service Ribbon	Kuwait Liberation Medal (Kuwait)
Unit awards	Joint Meritorious Unit Award		Valorous Unit Award
Foreign Jump wings	Bronze German Parachutist Badge		British Parachutist Badge
Badges	3rd Ranger Battalion; Combat Service Identification Badge		Expert Marksmanship Badge with Rifle Component Bar

- Struecker has also earned six Overseas Service Bars, 2nd Infantry Regiment DUI and Thai Parachutist Wings as well as other foreign wings and one unidentified fourragère.

== Post-military career ==
Immediately following his retirement from the military, Struecker joined the staff of Calvary Baptist Church in Columbus, Georgia and became its lead pastor in April 2014 and resigned the position in May 2019. Struecker then founded 2 Cities Church in Columbus, Georgia, where he is currently the lead pastor. Struecker has also continued to author books and he speaks regularly to audiences across the United States about his experiences and about his Christian faith.

=== Return to Mogadishu ===
In March 2013 Struecker returned to Mogadishu with a film crew to shoot a short film Return to Mogadishu: Remembering Black Hawk Down which debuted in October 2013 on the 20th anniversary of the battle. Struecker and fellow veteran-turned-country singer Keni Thomas relived the battle as they drove through the Bakaara Market in armored vehicles and visited the Wolcott crash site.

== Education and personal life ==
Struecker earned the Doctor of Philosophy from Southeastern Baptist Theological Seminary in Wake Forest, North Carolina, a Master of Divinity Degree from the Southern Baptist Theological Seminary in Louisville, Kentucky, and a Bachelor of Science Degree and Associate of Science Degree from Troy State University in Troy, Alabama.

He is married to his wife Dawn and has five children.

== Published books ==
- The Road To Unafraid: How the Army's Top Ranger Faced Fear and Found Courage through Black Hawk Down and Beyond (2006) ISBN 0-8499-0060-3
- Certain Jeopardy (2009) ISBN 0-8054-4853-5
- Blaze of Glory: A Novel (2010) ISBN 0-8054-4854-3
- Fallen Angel: A Novel (2011) ISBN 1-4336-7140-9
- Hide and Seek: A Novel (2012) ISBN 1-4336-7142-5
- Start Here (2021) ISBN 978-1736799109
