= Long-range surveillance company =

In the United States Army, a long-range surveillance company (LRS-C) is a company with a special reconnaissance role in an intelligence brigade.

== Organization ==
Consisting of a headquarters platoon, communications platoon, and three LRS platoons (each made up of a headquarters section and six surveillance teams.) All non-commissioned officers are airborne and Ranger qualified. All other personnel in the company are Pre-Ranger and airborne qualified. All Company Personnel undergo a week-long assessment and selection in addition to psychological evaluation. There are two types of selection, LRS selection and LRS Support personnel selection. Although all LRS team members can infiltrate via Land, Sea or Air; each platoon specializes in one method of infiltration. Each platoon is broken down into one of three infiltration specialties; Water, High Altitude Low Opening (HALO) and Desert Mountain.

A. Headquarters platoon. The headquarters platoon contains two sections for the command and control of the company in the areas of administration, logistics, and operations.

(1) Headquarters section. This section contains the personnel necessary for the command and control of the company and supply support.

(2) Operations section. The personnel in this section plan and control the employment of the teams, coordinate insertion and extraction of the teams to include external support, receive and report information from committed teams, and maintain the operational status of all teams. Liaison duties and planning for future operations are important functions of the operations section.

B. Communications platoon. The communications platoon operates the base radio stations. It helps the operations section plan and maintain communication with deployed teams. It works with the operations section or separately to relay information from deployed teams. It also performs unit maintenance on communication equipment organic to the unit. The platoon has a headquarters section and four base radio stations.

(1) Headquarters section. The personnel in this section establish command and control over assigned communications elements. They coordinate and set up communication procedures, transmission schedules, frequency allocation, and communication sites. They issue and control encryption code devices and materials. They ensure continuous communication between deployed teams and base radio stations. They provide communication support to detached LRS platoons. They augment division Long Range Surveillance Detachment's (LRS-D's) with communication support when directed. They also provide unit maintenance for company communication equipment.

(2) Base radio stations. The four base radio stations maintain communication between the operations base and the deployed teams. They operate on a 24-hour basis to make sure all message traffic to and from teams is processed immediately.

C. Long-range surveillance platoons. These three platoons contain a headquarters element and six surveillance teams each.

(1) Headquarters section. This section contains the personnel necessary for command, control, and training of the platoon.

(2) Surveillance teams. (LRS Team) Each team consists of a team leader, an assistant team leader, Senior Scout, scout observer, a RTO (Radio Telephone Operator) and an assistant RTO. The teams obtain and report information about enemy forces within the corps' area of interest. LRS teams also conduct Combat Search And Rescue missions. The teams can operate independently with little or no external support in all environments. Each team member is cross trained in the duties and responsibilities of the others. Every team member is responsible for at least two duties and responsibilities. LRS teams are often seen as the most elite infantryman. They are lightly armed with limited self-defense capabilities. To be easily transportable, they are equipped with lightweight, man-portable equipment. They are limited by the amount of weight that they can carry or cache. Because all team members are airborne qualified, all means of insertion are available to the commander when planning operations.
