= Best Ranger Competition =

Annual event in Fort Benning, GA

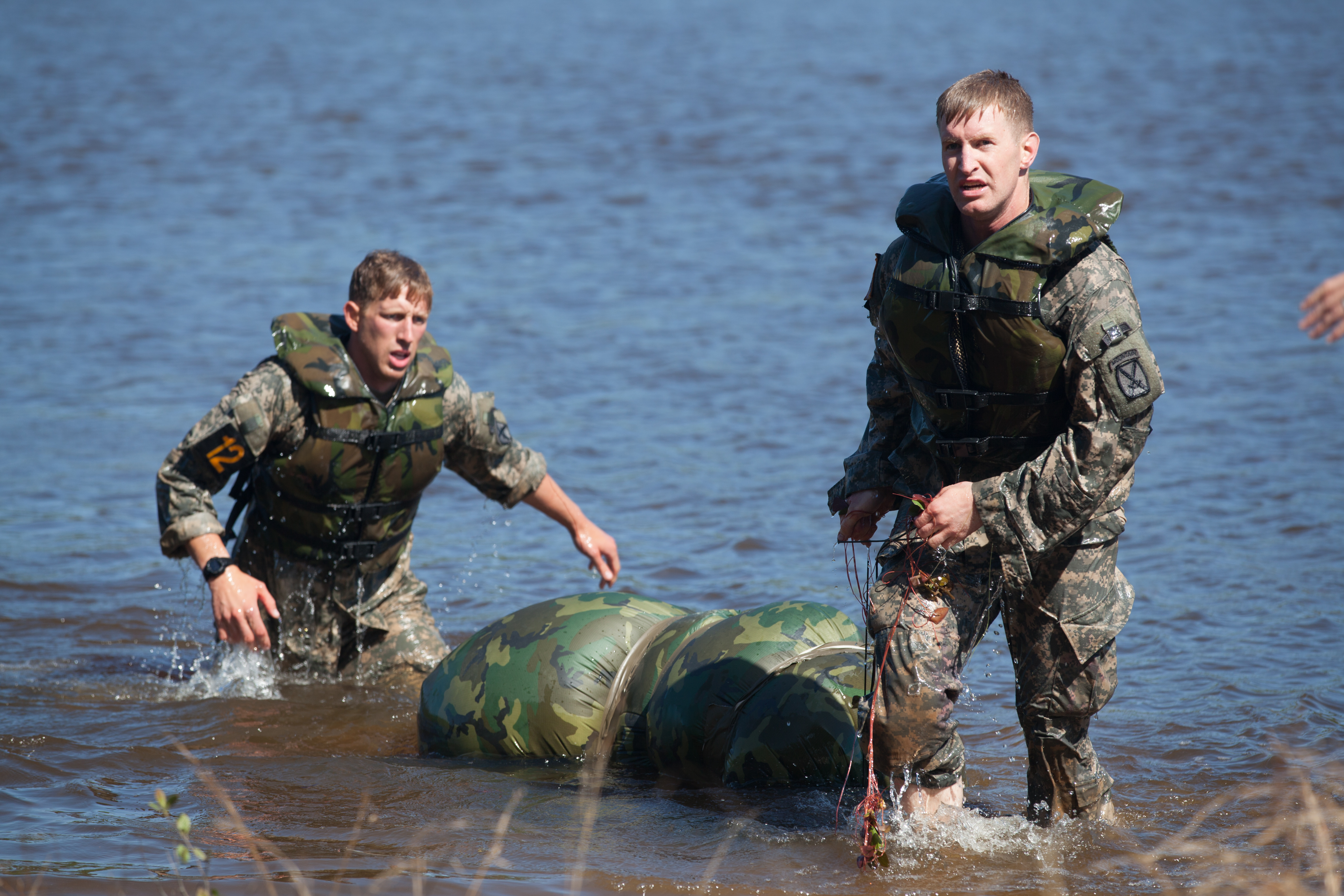
U.S. Army Capt. James McClare and 1st Lt. Anthony Day participating in the 2016 Best Ranger Competition.

The David E. Grange Jr. Best Ranger Competition is an annual competition held in Fort Benning, Georgia, hosted by the Airborne and Ranger Training Brigade. It is a two-person team competition where competitors must be active military who are Ranger Qualified.

Named after LTG David E. Grange Jr., the Best Ranger Competition was first held in 1982. The first competitions were limited to Ranger units, but from 1984 onwards it accepted teams from throughout the Army. As of 2018, the competition involves 50 two-person teams, mostly from the 75th Ranger Regiment and the ARTB, but also including a Coast Guard team. The competition takes 62 hours and involves tests of physical fitness, including runs and marches, and of marksmanship. The exact composition of events changes yearly.

Mike Rose is the only service member to have won BRC three times, having won each time he has entered. At Rose's first win in 2014, he entered as a second lieutenant while with the 25th Infantry Division, his partner was 2LT John Bergman - Together making them the youngest winners. In 2017 while with the 75th Ranger Regiment, Rose (now a captain) entered and won with MSG Joshua Horsager. (Horsager was the oldest winner at 39). In 2019 Rose again partnered with John Bergman (now a captain), this time representing the 101st Airborne Division. In 2019 the rules were modified to allow contestants only a maximum of 3 entries over their career, making Rose's achievement technically impossible to beat.

Five people have won BRC twice; Paul Scurka; Eric Turk; Walter Zajkowski; Timothy Briggs; (each with different partners each time); and John Bergman; who was Mike Rose's partner for two of Rose's three wins.

Sergeant Major Thomas Payne, who won the 2012 competition as a Sergeant First Class, had his Distinguished Service Cross upgraded to the Medal of Honor. He was presented the Medal of Honor by President Donald Trump on September 11, 2020, the 19th anniversary of the September 11 attacks.

The 2020 Competition was scheduled to be from April 16–18 but due to the COVID-19 pandemic, officials decided to cancel the 2020 event but with plans to continue with the 2021 competition.

== List of past winners ==
Year	Soldier	Soldier	Unit
1982	SFC Philip Sebay	SFC Charles Light	3rd Ranger Company, Benning Ranger Division
1983	SSG Michael Tilson	SSG Kevin Connell	2nd Ranger Company, Mountain Ranger Division
1984	SGT David Bazemore III	SGT Gregory Georgevitch	1st Battalion, 75th Ranger Regiment
1985	SSG Harvey Moore, Jr.	SGT Paul Scurka	HHC, 75th Ranger Regiment
1986	SGT Paul Scurka	SGT Bart Sexton	HHC, 75th Ranger Regiment
1987	SSG Joe Ullibari	SGT Ross Wilson	2nd Battalion, 75th Ranger Regiment
1988	SGT John Schlichte	SPC Karl Schlichte	3rd Battalion, 75th Ranger Regiment
1989	SGT Guy Fichtelman	SGT Mike Sonnenschein	3rd Battalion, 75th Ranger Regiment
1990	SSG Mark Sheehan	SSG Bobby Beiswanger	4th Ranger Training Brigade
1991			Canceled due to Operation Desert Storm.
1992	SFC Tom Wilburn	SFC Alven Brashier	5th Ranger Training Brigade
1993	CPT Blain Reeves	SSG Erik Wilson	4th Ranger Training Brigade
1994	CPT Edward Garcia	1LT Michael Richardson	82nd Airborne Division
1995	SSG Eric White	CPT Michael Trisler	25th Infantry Division
1996	SSG Jeff Struecker	SPC Isaac Gmazel	3rd Battalion, 75th Ranger Regiment
1997	2LT Jay Hansen	2LT Chris Robershaw	101st Airborne Division
1998	SFC Eric Riley	SSG Thomas Smith	4th Ranger Training Brigade
1999	SSG Kevin Teran	SSG Jim Moran	Ranger Training Brigade
2000	2LT Mark Messerschmitt	2LT Ahern	Infantry Officer Basic Course Detachment
2001	GYSGT Keith Oakes	SFC William Patterson	5th Ranger Training Battalion
2002	CPT Duane Patin	SSG Daniel Jenkins	5th Ranger Training Battalion
2003			Canceled due to the Invasion of Iraq
2004	SSG Colin Boley	SSG Adam Nash	75th Ranger Regiment
2005	CPT Corbett McCallum	SFC Gerald Nelson	4th Ranger Training Battalion
2006	SFC John Sheaffer	SPC Mikhail Venikov	75th Ranger Regiment
2007	MAJ Liam Collins	MSG Walter Zajkowski	United States Special Operations Command
2008	SSG Shayne Cherry	SSG Michael Broussard	75th Ranger Regiment
2009	SFC Blake Simms	SFC Chad Stackpole	Ranger Training Brigade
2010	MSG Eric Turk	MSG Eric Ross	United States Special Operations Command
2011	MSG Eric Turk	MSG Walter Zajkowski	United States Special Operations Command
2012	MSG Kevin Foutz	SFC Thomas Payne	United States Special Operations Command
2013	SFC Raymond Santiago	SFC Timothy Briggs	Ranger Training Brigade
2014	2LT Michael Rose	2LT John Bergman	25th Infantry Division
2015	SFC Timothy Briggs	SFC Jeremy Lemma	Airborne & Ranger Training Brigade
2016	CPT Robert Killian	SSG Erich Friedlein	Army National Guard
2017	MSG Joshua Horsager	CPT Michael Rose	75th Ranger Regiment
2018	SFC Joshua Rolfes	SFC Anthony Allen	Airborne and Ranger Training Brigade
2019	CPT Michael Rose	CPT John Bergman	101st Airborne Division
2020			Cancelled due to the COVID-19 pandemic
2021	1LT Vince Paikowski	1LT Alastair Keys	75th Ranger Regiment
2022	CPT Joshua Corson	CPT Tymothy Boyle	75th Ranger Regiment
2023	SPC Justin Rein	CPT Luke Ebeling	75th Ranger Regiment
2024	SGT Matthew Dunphy	1LT Andrew Winski	75th Ranger Regiment
2025	1LT Kevin Moore	1LT Griff Hokanson	75th Ranger Regiment
2026	SPC Caleb Godbold	SGT Drew Schorsch	75th Ranger Regiment
