= David E. Grange Jr. =

United States Army general (1925–2022)

David Ellsworth Grange Jr.
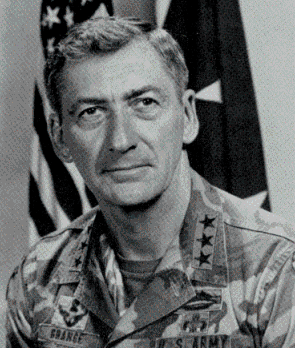
- David E. Grange
- Born: April 9, 1925; Richmond Hill, New York, U.S.
- Died: September 11, 2022 (aged 97)
- Burial place: Fort Mitchell National Cemetery
- Relatives: David L. Grange (son)
- Military career
- Allegiance: United States
- Branch: United States Army
- Service years: 1943–1984
- Rank: Lieutenant General
- Commands: Sixth United States Army; United States Army Infantry School; 2nd Infantry Division; 3rd Brigade, 101st Airborne Division; 2nd Battalion, 506th Infantry Regiment
- Conflicts: World War II; Korean War; Vietnam War
- Awards: Defense Distinguished Service Medal; Army Distinguished Service Medal; Silver Star (3); Legion of Merit (2); Distinguished Flying Cross; Soldier's Medal; Bronze Star Medal (4); Purple Heart

David Ellsworth Grange Jr. (April 9, 1925 – September 11, 2022) was a lieutenant general in the United States Army.

== Early life ==
Grange was born on April 9, 1925, in Richmond Hill, New York, New York City, and grew up in Lake Ronkonkoma, New York. He joined the United States Army in June 1943 and served as an enlisted parachute infantryman in Europe, taking part in the Rome-Arno, Southern France, Rhineland, Ardennes, and Central Europe Campaigns as a member of the 517th Parachute Infantry Regiment. In 1949, he departed the 82nd Airborne Division to attend Officer Candidate School. He was commissioned a second lieutenant of Infantry in 1950, with an initial assignment with the 187th Airborne Infantry Regiment in Korea.

== Education ==
Grange was a graduate of the Strategic Intelligence Course, the Russian language course at the Defense Language Institute, the Command and General Staff College, and the Army War College. He held a Bachelor of Arts degree in history from the University of Omaha and attended the Advanced Management Course for Executives at the University of Pittsburgh.

== Assignments ==
Grange served in a variety of assignments, including: two tours in Korea as a Rifle Platoon Leader (1950–51) and Rifle Company Commander (1952–53); Ranger Instructor; Staff Officer, Department of the Army Staff, Pentagon; 10th Special Forces Group, Germany (1957–60); Advisor in the Republic of Vietnam (1st tour) (1963–64); AcofS, G1, 82nd Airborne Division; Commander 2nd Battalion, 506th Infantry (Vietnam) (2nd tour) (1967–68); Commander, DISCOM, 101st Airborne Division (Vietnam) (3rd tour) (1970–71); Commander, 3rd Brigade, 101st Airborne Division (Vietnam) (3rd tour) (1970–71); director, Ranger Department, United States Army Infantry School; Assistant Division Commander (Support), 4th Infantry Division; Assistant Division Commander (Maneuver), 4th Infantry Division; Chief of Staff, I Corps (ROK/US Group), Korea.

Toward the end of his career, Grange served in a variety of high level command assignments including Commanding General, United States Army Readiness and Mobilization Region VIII (1976–78); Commanding General, 2nd Infantry Division, Korea (1978–79); Commanding General, United States Army Infantry School, Fort Benning, Georgia (1979–81); and, finally, Commanding General, Sixth United States Army (1981–84). Grange retired in June 1984, after 41 years of service.

Grange is among the few paratroopers in United States Army history to make three combat jumps—one during World War II (Southern France) and two in Korea (the Battle of Yongju and Operation Tomahawk). His other distinctions include three awards each of the Combat Infantryman Badge (for World War II, Korea and Vietnam) and the Silver Star for heroism in combat.

== Personal life and legacy ==
In 1982, the annual "David E. Grange Jr. Best Ranger Competition" was founded. His son, David L. Grange, also went on to serve as a United States Army general officer.

Grange died on September 11, 2022, at the age of 97.

== Awards and decorations ==
Lieutenant General Grange's numerous decorations, medals and badges include:

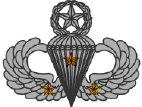

Badge	Combat Infantryman Badge with 2 stars (3rd award)			
Badge	Master Parachutist Badge with 3 combat jump stars			
1st Row	Defense Distinguished Service Medal	Army Distinguished Service Medal	Silver Star with 2 bronze Oak leaf clusters	Legion of Merit with 1 bronze Oak leaf cluster
2nd Row	Distinguished Flying Cross	Soldier's Medal	Bronze Star with "V" device and 3 bronze Oak leaf clusters	Purple Heart
3rd Row	Air Medal with "V" device and Award numeral 27	Joint Service Commendation Medal with "V" device	Army Commendation Medal with "V" device and 3 bronze Oak leaf clusters	Air Force Commendation Medal
4th Row	Army Good Conduct Medal	American Campaign Medal	European–African–Middle Eastern Campaign Medal with Arrowhead device and 1 silver Campaign star	World War II Victory Medal
5th Row	Army of Occupation Medal	National Defense Service Medal with 1 Service star	Korean Service Medal with Arrowhead device and 2 Campaign stars	Armed Forces Expeditionary Medal
6th Row	Vietnam Service Medal with 3 Campaign stars	Army Service Ribbon	Army Overseas Service Ribbon	Legion of Honour (Officier)
7th Row	South Korean Order of Military Merit with gold star (4th Class)	Order of National Security Merit; 2nd Class	Order of National Security Merit; 3rd Class	Vietnam Gallantry Cross with palm
8th Row	Vietnam Armed Forces Honor Medal; 1st Class	United Nations Korea Medal	Vietnam Campaign Medal with "60-" clasp	Korean War Service Medal
Tab	Ranger Tab			
Unit awards	Republic of Korea Presidential Unit Citation		Vietnam Gallantry Cross Unit Citation with palm and frame	Vietnam Civil Action Unit Citation with palm and frame (1st Class)

General Grange was an inaugural member of the U.S. Army Ranger Hall of Fame and the U.S. Army Officer Candidate Hall of Fame. He was selected as 1984 Airborne Trooper of the Year by the Airborne Association, was the 1994 recipient of the Infantry's "Doughboy Award," and was named an honorary Sergeant Major of the Army by the Association of the United States Army in 2016.
