= Long-range surveillance detachment =

The United States Army long range surveillance detachment (LRSD) is organized as a detachment organic to the military intelligence battalion at division level for the purpose of long-range surveillance. The LRSD's are organized into a headquarters section, communications section (two base radio stations), and six surveillance teams. (Light division LRS detachments only have four surveillance teams.) The leaders are airborne and Ranger qualified. All other personnel in the detachment are airborne qualified. Most active Army LRSDs were inactivated in September 2005, with the notable exceptions 173rd Airborne's LRSD which was deactivated in 2006 and the 82nd Airborne's LRSD, which was converted to Pathfinders in 2008, and most Army National Guard units were inactivated in September 2008; remaining units were reflagged and redesignated as dismounted reconnaissance troops (typically designated Troop C) within the brigade's RSTA squadron by 2011.

== Headquarters section ==
This section contains the personnel necessary for command and control of the detachment.

== Communications section ==
Paratroopers assigned to the Communications section ensure expeditious processing of all message traffic. The two base stations maintain communication with deployed teams and have the capability to deploy and operate radio-relay sites if needed. The section trains all personnel in the unit on proper communications procedures and operation of communications equipment. Personnel in the communications section also receive training on infantry tactics and reconnaissance and surveillance. Personnel assigned to the section can also attend Pathfinder, Air Assault, Ranger, and other military courses. At times, members of the section will augment LRS teams on certain operations or due to manpower shortages. The LRS-D may be augmented with a base station from the Corps LRS-C if dictated by operational requirements, equipment shortages, or maintenance problems.

== Surveillance teams (LRS teams) ==
Each team consists of a team leader, an assistant team leader, senior scout observer, scout observer, alternate radio telephone operator (ARTO) and a radio telephone operator (RATELO). The teams obtain and report information about enemy forces within their assigned areas. They can operate independently with little or no external support in all environments. They are lightly armed with limited self-defense capabilities. To be easily transportable, they are equipped with lightweight, man-portable equipment. The teams are limited by the amount of weight that they can carry or cache. The rucksacks used by the 82nd LRSD in Afghanistan during OEF VIII often weighed over 100lbs.

== See also ==
- Long-range reconnaissance patrol
- Long-range surveillance
- Long-range surveillance company
- Reconnaissance and Surveillance Leaders Course
