= Dismounted reconnaissance troop =

Military scout unit type

A dismounted reconnaissance troop (DRT) is a reconnaissance unit found within U.S. Army RSTA squadrons that are part of infantry brigade combat teams (IBCTs). While a RSTA squadron serves as the primary reconnaissance element for its parent brigade, the DRT serves as the specialized reconnaissance element for the squadron when conducting clandestine reconnaissance and surveillance. Consisting of about 80 personnel, the DRT is less mobile than traditional cavalry units, however DRTs provide a greater ability to operate within complex and difficult terrain as well as providing close reconnaissance, surveillance, and sniper support in areas inaccessible to the rest of the squadron. They are traditionally designated as the "C troop" within the squadron. The DRTs continue on the Recondo legacy of the Vietnam-era Long Range Reconnaissance Patrols (LRRP), however, compared to the LRRPs they are often assigned additional non-reconnaissance responsibilities such as battlespace ownership. As of 2024, some DRTs have been converted to Multifunctional Reconnaissance Companies (MFRC), with a greater focus on unmanned aerial systems (UAS) and less reliance on snipers. In 2025, as part of the Army's transition of Infantry Brigade Combat Teams (IBCTs) to Mobile Brigade Combat Teams (MBCTs), DRTs were formally converted to MFRCs with the rollout planned to be completed by 2027.

== Mission and Capabilities ==
The primary task of the dismounted reconnaissance troop is to provide all-weather continuous, accurate, timely, and stealthy reconnaissance and security missions in complex, close, or urban terrain, for its parent squadron and brigade, whether as part of offensive or defensive operations. The troop gathers intelligence about multidimensional threats, both conventional and unconventional, and supports targeting and target acquisition. The dismounted reconnaissance troop is primarily foot-mobile, with limited light vehicle support, but is able to assume a motorized reconnaissance role given additional mobility assets; when organized as such, it is referred to as a motorized reconnaissance troop (MRT). Though capable of performing many of the same missions as the mounted cavalry troops, as there is only one DRT in the brigade, in practice it is reserved for specialized missions and operations (particularly involving terrain that denies the usage of heavier vehicles or when emphasizing stealth over speed) or rarely for directs fires on specific targets provided in the commander's high-payoff target list (HPTL). The troop is trained to conduct waterborne insertions using Zodiac inflatable boats. The troop is also trained to conduct aerial insertion and extraction using the SPIES system, fast-roping, helocasting, or through establishing its own helicopter landing zone through pathfinding operations. The troop can increase their sustainment capability for extended duration operations through prepositioning of supplies and caches.

According to ATTP 3-20.97, the DRT has the following capabilities:

- Provides all-weather, continuous, accurate, and timely reconnaissance and security in complex, close, and urban terrain.
- Employs small unmanned aircraft systems (SUAS) to enhance reconnaissance efforts.
- Gathers information about multidimensional threats, both conventional and unconventional.
- Conducts stealthy reconnaissance and security operations.
- Rapidly assesses situations and directs combat power, reconnaissance, and security capabilities to meet PIR.
- Assists in answering a CCIR.
- Detects threat deception, decoys, and cover and concealment that otherwise would not be detected by single-capability surveillance means by employing integrated and synchronized reconnaissance.
- Supports targeting and target acquisition through available ground and aerial assets, including the fire support team (FIST) and SUASs.
- Rapidly develops the situation.
- Assists in shaping the AO by providing information or directing fires to disrupt the threat.
- Conducts reconnaissance of one zone, two routes, or six areas.
- Conducts up to 12 short-duration observation posts (OPs) for a period of less than 12 hours, or up to six long-duration OPs up to 24 hours, or up to six extended-duration OPs beyond 24 hours based on METT-TC variables.
- Conducts ground, water, and air insertion.
- Employs organic indirect fire support (FS) (60-mm mortar) to the troop.

=== Reconnaissance operations ===
The dismounted reconnaissance troop is capable of both long-range and close reconnaissance. The troop's reconnaissance mission primarily focuses on area reconnaissance when organized as a DRT; but is capable of performing route and zone reconnaissance in permissive environments (or in all environments when organized as an MRT). Neither the DRT nor the squadron is equipped to conduct a reconnaissance in force, though the squadron can do so with significant augmentation with combat elements. In these cases, the DRT may conduct a screen, area, or zone reconnaissance in support of the reconnaissance in force. The DRT is capable of conducting one zone recon, multiple area recons, or two route recons simultaneously within the squadron's area of operations. Without the DRT, the squadron and brigade limit their ability to conduct pathfinder operations for air insertions and large-scale landing zone operations.

=== Security operations ===
The DRT's security mission set is primarily focused around screening (whether stationary or mobile) and local security. The troop has a limited capability for performing the area security (including route security), and convoy security missions (usually when reinforced by the main body or augmented with additional vehicles and aircraft). The troop is not independently capable of executing the guard or cover missions, but is capable of participating in those operations when conducted by a higher unit, again usually by supporting with a screen. The DRT is capable of conducting either a moving or a stationary screen, and can screen the front, flanks, and rear of a stationary force, and to the flanks or rear of a moving force.

=== Stability operations ===
In stability operations, the dismounted reconnaissance troop performs the following missions:

- Reconnaissance missions -- primarily area reconnaissance in restricted terrain and urban environments, which leverage the DRT's stealthy nature;
  - In stability operations, the DRT is tasked with conducting HUMINT operations within its capabilities;
- Security force assistance -- specifically the DRT is tasked with partnering, augmenting, and advising the host nation forces;
- Information engagement -- mainly through identifying and engaging with local leaders;
- Area security missions -- primarily around urban areas and population centers;
- Other stability missions -- on occasion the DRT may be tasked with supporting an attack or a squadron movement to contact (normally a search and attack or cordon and search) may require augmentation), or assist with defending a perimeter or area of operations.

=== Direct and indirect fires ===
If the commander desires to operate with liberal engagement criteria, the DRT is ideal for fire support missions and utilizing the sniper teams for precision direct-fire engagements.

== Organization ==
The IBCT cavalry squadron includes a headquarters troop, two mounted cavalry troops, and a dismounted reconnaissance troop. In squadrons supporting an airborne brigade combat team, 100% of the RSTA soldiers are qualified paratroopers. Unlike the other troops, the DRT is an infantry element, though task-organized as cavalry (e.g. a "troop", typically troop C within the squadron).

The squadron's dismounted reconnaissance troop includes:

- a headquarters section
  - The headquarters section includes the troop commander, executive officer, first sergeant, unit supply, and attached fire support team and combat medics.
- two dismounted scout platoons
  - Each scout platoon is divided into three reconnaissance teams (sections) of eight scouts.
  - Each reconnaissance team has a staff sergeant as team leader and a sergeant as assistant team leader, with each subset team having two scouts and a radio-telephone operator.
- a mortar section
  - The mortar section consists of a six-man 60mm mortar section that can be split into two sections and is attached to either of the two scout platoons or the headquarters section, plus a fire direction center.
- a sniper squad
  - The sniper squad consists of a squad leader, two three-man sniper teams, and an HMMWV. A third sniper team can be formed when needed on an ad-hoc basis.
- an attached fire support team
  - The DRT's Fire Support Team (FIST) is attached from the fires support platoon in the squadron, consisting of a fire support officer (FSO), a HMMWV, and a forward observer (FO) with a radio operator. The FIST vehicle is capable of serving as an alternate troop command post if necessary, as the FSO has ready access to the higher-level situational understanding and common operating picture, as well as the radio systems necessary to serve as a backup. The FIST can also include up to eight two-man dismounted forward observer teams.

Combat medics are allocated with one combat medic per platoon in the troop and while the senior troop combat medic normally collocates with the first sergeant. The DRT also has a Raven unmanned aerial vehicle (UAV) which is typically used to support either of the two scout platoons or to surveil a separate named area of interest; some DRTs have utilized other platform such as the Instant Eye sUAS. Total strength includes 79 personnel, four HMMWVs and an FMTV.

The dismounted reconnaissance troop is a specialized unit with air and water assets to allow for clandestine infiltration. Due to the numerous ‘F7’ coded Pathfinder slots and trained personnel, the DRT is often used as the squadron and brigade's pathfinder element. While largely lacking organic transport, the dismounted reconnaissance troop is easily deployable from both fixed-wing and rotary-wing aircraft. The DRT gives the IBCT Cavalry squadron the ability to operate in complex and difficult terrain with its dismounted forces. However the mix of mounted and dismounted troops within the squadron creates a mismatch in maneuvering ability and may require augmentation with additional transportation resources.

=== Augmentation ===
The dismounted reconnaissance troop does not have its own organic combat engineers, but may be augmented with support from one or more of the brigade's sapper squads. When technical reconnaissance is necessary requiring engineering expertise, or for countermobility operations, or when supporting a larger reconnaissance mission, the troop may receive an engineering reconnaissance team (ERT) in support. Obstacle intelligence (OBSTINTEL) is considered a high-frequency task of the ERT, as are clearing operations.

The brigade's Combat Observation and Lasing Team (COLT), though not organically part of the DRT, is often collocated with the troop to provide additional supporting fires.

When additional HUMINT collections capability is required by the troop, it can be augmented with a Human Intelligence Collection Team (HCT), typically composed of three collectors and one technician.

If additional SUAS merit, the troop can be assigned additional SUAS support from the IBCT, such as the RQ-7 Shadow.

In some cases, the DRT may be tasked by the brigade to act as the “chief of scouts” by incorporating scouts from all dismounted elements in the brigade such as the line infantry battalion's reconnaissance platoons; this formation has been nicknamed a “super DRT”.

=== Evolution ===
In 2016 there were proposals to change to IBCT's task organization to disband the DRT in favor of adding additional combat power to the mounted reconnaissance troops. Known as the “3 x 36” concept, the mounted troop's three platoons would be increased to 36 scouts with 128 personnel total in the troop.

In 2024, 2nd Brigade Combat Team, 101st Airborne Division (Air Assault) began prototype testing of the mobile brigade combat team (MBCT) concept; in which the RSTA squadron's dismounted reconnaissance troop was reflagged as a Multifunctional Reconnaissance Company (MFRC). In comparison to the DRT, the MFRC has fewer snipers but more UAS and cUAS assets, as well as an organic air-defense capability in the form of a Stinger team. By 2025, the MBCT concept had been adopted as the new standard, with 25 IBCTs to be transitioned to MBCTs by the end of 2027. As part of this transition, the cavalry squadrons of every IBCT will be deactivated, with their former C troops (DRTs) becoming the basis for standing up new MFRCs to fill the role of a dedicated infantry reconnaissance formation to answer a brigade commander's priority intelligence requirements (PIRs).

The US Marine Corps features a similar formation type with the All-Domain Reconnaissance Detachments, which when combined with an Army DRT, has been task-organized as a multidomain reconnaissance troop, or MDRT, and tasked with facilitating the joint targeting of enemy A2/AD systems.

== Training ==
Unlike the rest of a RSTA squadron, in which line troops are primarily trained as MOS 19D (cavalry scout), the dismounted reconnaissance troops consist of 11B (direct fire infantryman) in the scout platoons and sniper section; 11C (indirect fire infantryman) in the 60 mm M224 Mortar Section; and 11Bs, 25Cs (Radio Operator-Maintainers), 74Ds (CBRN specialists), and 92Ys (Supply specialists) in the headquarters section, led by 11A officers and an 11Z 1SG. Common training pipelines include the Reconnaissance and Surveillance Leaders Course (RSLC), US Army Reconnaissance Course, Cavalry Leader's Course, sniper school, Ranger school, Mountain Rifleman school, SERE school, pathfinder school, and in applicable IBCTs, air assault school, airborne school, and jumpmaster school.

Personnel assigned to reconnaissance units are considered high-risk-of-capture and subject to isolation in hostile territory. Soldiers assigned to DRTs are trained and proficient in survival and evasion and recovery tactics, techniques and procedures as well as personnel recovery. The troop's FSO and members of the FIST team are trained FOs. They may control CAS as a non-joint terminal attack controller (JTAC)-qualified individual when no U.S. Air Force Forward Air Controller (Airborne), Tactical Air Control Party, or JTAC is available; with additional training the FO can qualify as a joint fires observer (JFO).

== Equipment ==
The troop is lightly equipped with HMMWVs with trailers, LMTV vehicles with trailers, and Zodiac inflatable boats with silenced motors, though additional motorized, aerial, or waterborne assets may augment the troop's mobility for specific operations. Scouts within the troop utilize primarily the M4 carbine, as well as the M249 SAW, M203 and M320 40mm grenade launchers. The M2 .50 caliber machine gun is used mounted on the troop's vehicles, or can be dismounted and man-packed when needed. The mortar section utilizes 60mm mortars; the sniper section utilizes .50 caliber M107 sniper rifles, 7.62mm XM2010 Enhanced Sniper Rifles, 7.62mm M24 Sniper Weapon Systems, and 7.62mm M110 sniper rifles; and anti-vehicle capability is bolstered with Javelin missiles. Each FIST vehicle possesses a target acquisition/communications suite with a laser capable of designating for laser-guided munitions. The troop is one of the few formations in the IBCT that has the ability to conduct long-range high frequency (HF) and tactical satellite (TACSAT) communications to relay information.

== See also ==
- C Troop, 1st Squadron, 152nd Cavalry—the DRT for the 53rd Infantry Brigade Combat Team
- Long-range surveillance company
- Long-range reconnaissance patrol
- Reconnaissance and surveillance squadrons - predecessor formation type at the squadron level
- Battlefield surveillance brigades - predecessor formation type at the brigade level
- United States Army Reconnaissance and Surveillance Leaders Course
- Recondo
- Palsar Nahal - similar structure, a specialized company-level reconnaissance unit within the IDF's Nahal Brigade's reconnaissance battalion.
- United States Marine Corps Reconnaissance Battalions - provide a similar capability at the battalion level
