= Long-range surveillance =

Units of the U.S. Army

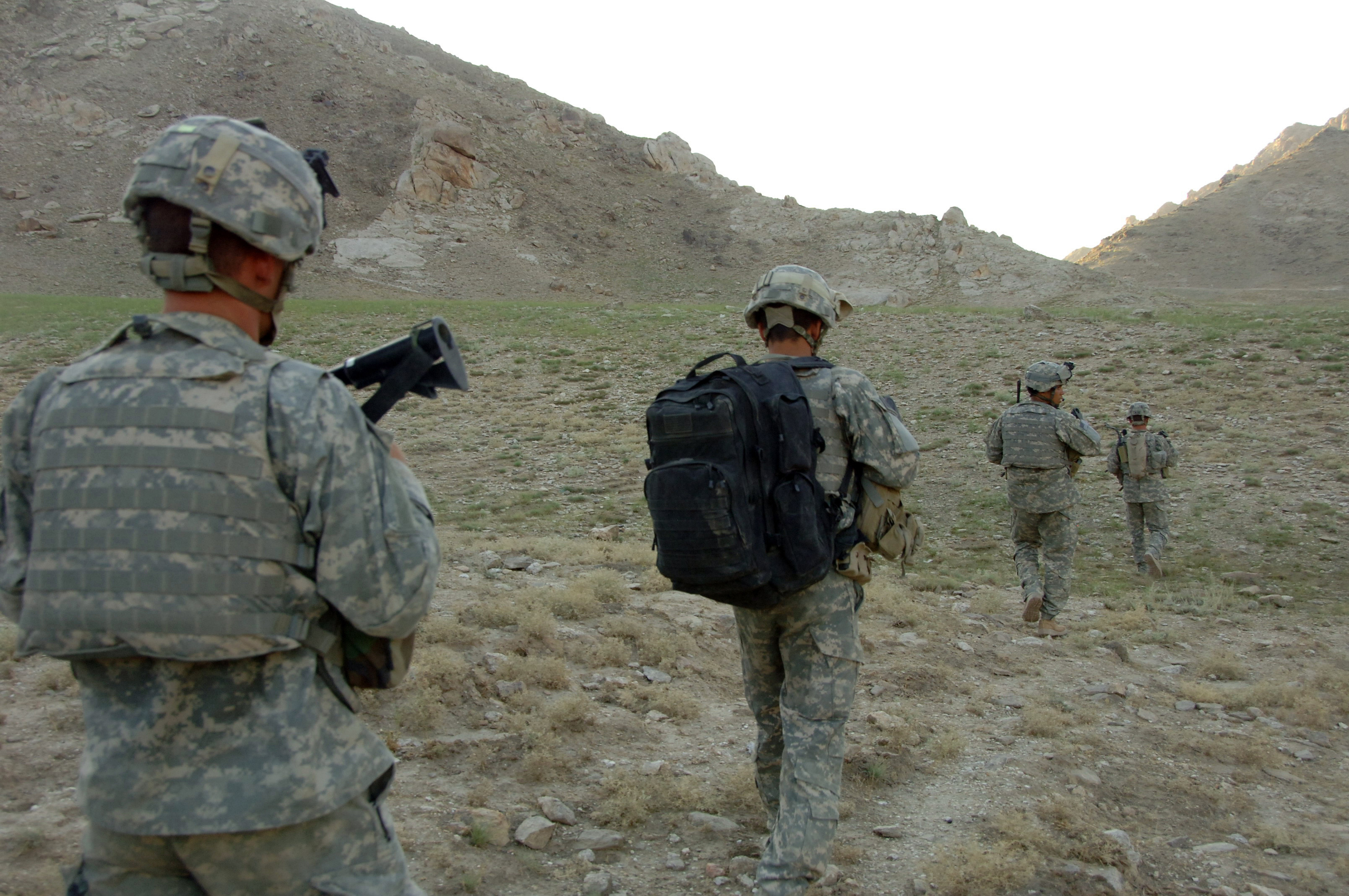
A long-range surveillance team from the 82nd Airborne Division in Afghanistan during 2007

Long-range surveillance (LRS) teams (pronounced "lurse") were elite, specially-trained surveillance units of the United States Army employed for gathering direct human intelligence information deep within enemy territory. Classic LRS employment is to infiltrate deep into enemy territory, construct hide and surveillance sites, and provide continuous surveillance of an intelligence target of key interest.

LRS teams allow 24-hour surveillance and analysis coverage unlike unmanned aerial vehicles (UAVs), manned aircraft, and most satellites. Assuming there is no mission compromise, these teams typically remain in position for up to six days, as determined by the availability of food and water.

As a result of an evaluation conducted using computer-modelling the U.S. Army's senior leadership made the decision to deactivate all active-duty and National Guard LRS units. By the end of January 2017 the three active-duty LRS companies had ceased to exist, with its personnel being reassigned to other units. The seven National Guard LRS units followed suit in 2018. The long range reconnaissance and surveillance mission within the Army's conventional forces now rests with the Multifunctional Reconnaissance Company of each Mobile Brigade Combat Team.

== Mission ==
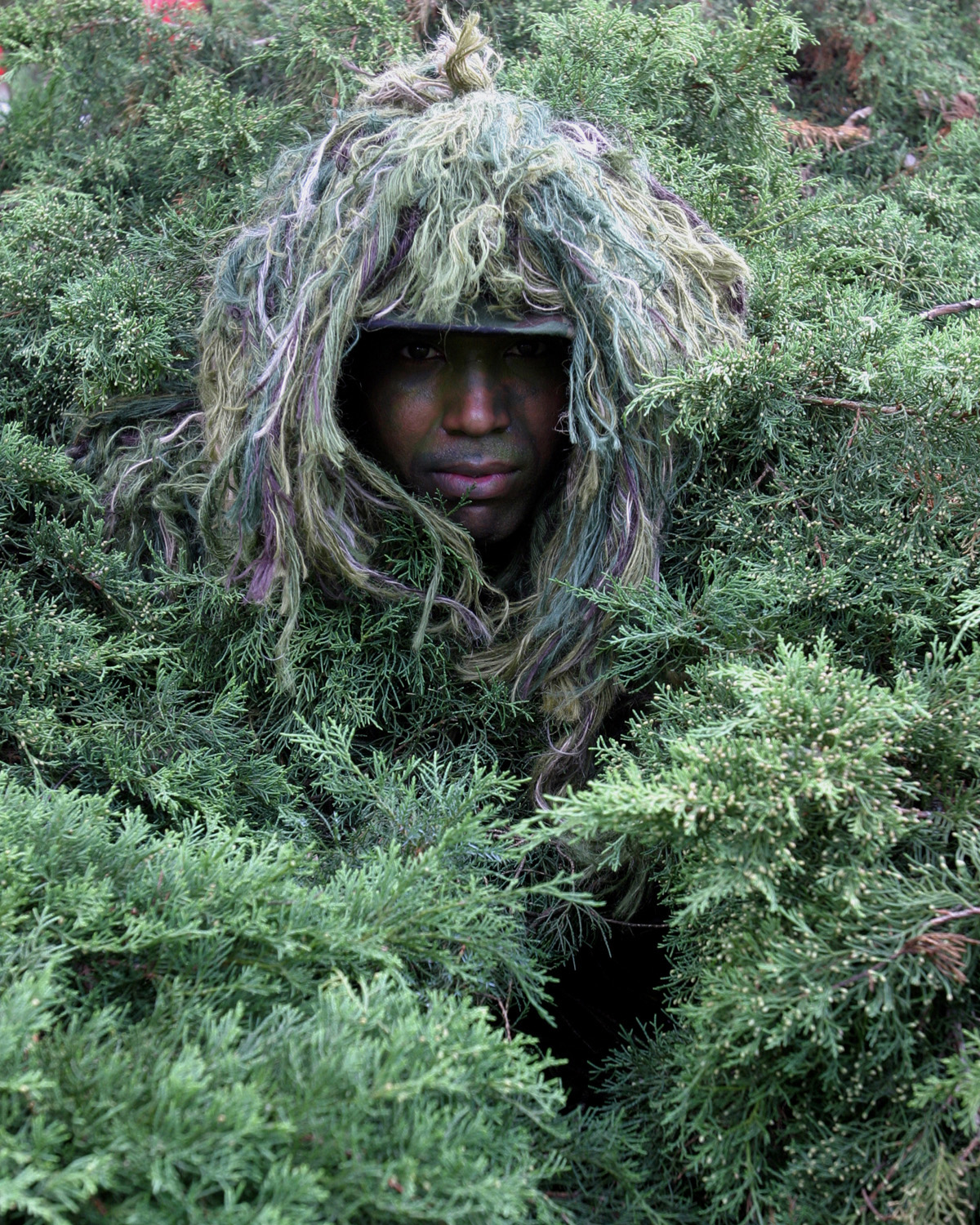
Staff Sgt. Anthony Purnell, a soldier from Echo Company, 51st Infantry Company, Long-Range Surveillance, V Corps demonstrating a ghillie suit in 2004

Long Range Surveillance Units (LRSU) have four primary missions and five secondary missions as per Field Manual 3-55.93 Long Range Surveillance Unit Operations. The four primary missions are surveillance, zone and area reconnaissance, target acquisition, and target interdiction. Combat assessment/battle damage assessment is mentioned as not a standalone LRSU mission but inherent to all LRSUs. The five secondary missions are able to be completed if given the proper training and time to coordinate. The secondary missions include route reconnaissance, emplacement and recovery of sensors, pathfinder operations, personnel recovery and combat search and rescue, and chemical detection and radiological surveillance and monitoring operations.

LRS operations are characterized by the following:

1. Clandestine LRS operations require operational security (OPSEC) and personnel security (PERSEC) measures and procedures before, during, and after mission employment. This is to protect the individual team members as well as maintain operational integrity of the LRS cell.
2. Team members depend on stealth, cover, concealment, infantry, and Ranger skills.
3. Team members avoid contact with enemy forces and local population.
4. Teams are employed to obtain timely information.
5. Teams have restricted mobility in the area of operations.
6. Team members depend on communications, knowing the enemy's order of battle, and equipment identification skills.
7. The surveillance or reconnaissance area is small, has a specified route, or is a specific location or installation.
8. Team equipment and supplies are limited to what can be man packed or cached.
9. Teams require detailed intelligence preparation of the battlefield (IPB) and debriefing from the Intelligence Officer (G2) for employment.

== Organization ==
LRS units (LRSU) were infantry company-size elements that are assets within a battlefield surveillance brigade's reconnaissance and surveillance squadron (R&S squadron) designated as US Army cavalry but were functionally airborne infantry units. The LRSU was structured as an LRS company comprising three LRS detachments, a communications platoon, and a troop headquarters. Within the LRS company, the LRS detachments typically have designated specialties. Typically, there were three teams, also known as "DETs." 1st DET typically specializes in mountainous terrain/warfare. 2nd DET specialized in airborne operations. 3rd DET was the dive detachment, specializing in water-borne operations such as scuba diving and infiltrating harbors and ports as well as employing the Zodiac. LRS detachments were organized as five unsupported LRS teams.

== LRS team composition ==
As with LRRP units of the past each US Army LRS team was composed of six soldiers:

- Team leader (TL) staff sergeant (E-6) preferably Ranger qualified
- Assistant team leader (ATL) sergeant (E-5) preferably Ranger qualified
- Senior scout observer (SSO) specialist/corporal (E-4)
- Scout observer (SO) specialist/corporal (E-4)
- Radio telephone operator (RTO) specialist (E-4)
- Assistant radio telephone operator (ARTO) specialist (E-4)

== Reconnaissance and surveillance squadrons (R&S squadrons) ==
From 2006 to 2015, United States Army long-range surveillance units were reorganized into newly formed battlefield surveillance brigades (BfSBs). These brigades contained a brigade headquarters and headquarters company (HHC), two Military Intelligence (MI) battalions, and a reconnaissance and surveillance (R&S) squadron.

The BfSB’s R&S squadron was composed of one LRS unit (i.e., Company C), which contains 15 LRS teams. Additionally, the R&S squadron also had two cavalry troops (each containing two platoons) that conducted basic mounted and dismounted operations, and a headquarters and headquarters troop (HHT).

For a standard six-soldier LRS team, the primary method of insertion/infiltration behind enemy lines was at night by helicopter (night-time heliborne), while secondary methods included airborne and waterborne operations. In recent low-intensity conflicts, additional covert methods were added to enable enhanced operational capabilities.

== Contrast with reconnaissance, surveillance, and target acquisition (RSTA) units ==
Although both are types of units in the United States Army, LRS units were not the same as RSTA units.

During the Army-wide transfer to brigade combat teams (BCTs), all combat divisions and separate brigades have transitioned to RSTA units. RSTA units have added light vehicle support in the form of Humvees (HMMWVs) and M3 Bradley Cavalry Fighting Vehicles (CFVs), due to being commissioned as Cavalry. RSTA squadrons also feature a company-sized dismounted reconnaissance troop, typically composed of infantry scouts, which conducts dismounted reconnaissance and surveillance operations.

LRS units, in contrast, did not utilize a larger vehicle support element. Most RSTA units are not Airborne-capable, whereas most LRS units were. Exceptions typically include the RSTA squadrons of airborne infantry BCTs, such as the 2nd BCT (Airborne), 11th Airborne Division; the 173rd Airborne BCT; and the four RSTA units in the 82nd Airborne Division).

== Equipment ==
LRS soldiers typically carried weapons that include the following: M4 carbine, M9 pistol, M249 squad automatic weapon (SAW/LMG), M203 grenade launcher, as well as mission-specific gear, including (but not limited to), optics, A/V recording devices, secure communications gear, etc.

== Training ==
LRS leaders typically graduated from the United States Army Reconnaissance and Surveillance Leaders Course (see link and course list below).

LRS soldiers were often graduates of other specialized military courses and training, including:

- U.S. Army Air Assault Course
- U.S. Army Jumpmaster Course
- U.S. Army Military Free Fall Parachutist Course
- U.S. Army Pathfinder Course
- U.S. Army Ranger Course
- U.S. Army Reconnaissance and Surveillance Leaders Course (RSLC)^{1},^{2}
- U.S. Army Special Forces Combat Diver Qualification Course (SFCDQC)
- U.S. Army Special Forces Sniper Course (SFSC)^{3}
- U.S. Army Special Forces Waterborne Infiltration Course (SFWIC)
- U.S. Army Special Operations Combat Medic (SOCM)
- U.S. Army Survival, Evasion, Resistance, and Escape (SERE)
- U.S. Army Sniper Course

United States Army LRSUs have conducted training exercises and exchange programs with various U.S. allies. These exercises included deployments to England, Germany, France, Hungary, and Italy. Combined/Joint training exercises have involved units from Britain’s TA SAS, France's 13e RDP, Belgium's ESR, Italy's 9th Parachute Assault Regiment, and Germany's FSLK200.

The International Special Training Center (ISTC) trains NATO Special Operations Forces (SOFs) and similar units in advanced individual patrolling, battlefield medicine, close quarter battle (CQB), sniper, survival, planning, and recognition skills. Established in 1979, ISTC was originally named the International Long-Range Reconnaissance Patrol School (ILRRPS), and was formerly located in Weingarten, Germany before later moving to Pfullendorf, Germany.

1. Formerly: United States Army Long-Range Reconnaissance and Surveillance Leaders Course (LRRSLC)
2. Formerly: United States Army Long-Range Surveillance Leaders Course (LRSLC)
3. Formerly: United States Army Special Operations Target Interdiction Course (SOTIC)

== See also ==
- Combat tracking
- Company F, 425th Infantry—Michigan NG Ranger and LRS unit
- Fernspähkompanie Special unit of the German Bundeswehr similar to LRS
- Honourable Artillery Company and 4/73 Battery—Similar elements in the British Army
- Long-range penetration
- Long-range reconnaissance patrol
- Long-range surveillance company
- Long-range surveillance detachment
- Patruljekompagniet—The only LRS unit of the Danish Armed Forces
- Special reconnaissance
- Ranger Regimental Reconnaissance Company (RRC)

== General and cited sources ==
- Long Range Surveillance: True test for ‘quiet professional’
- Eyes Behind the Lines: US Army Long-Range Reconnaissance and Surveillance Units
- US Army Field Manual 7-93 Long-Range Surveillance Unit Operations. (FM 7-93)
- PDF downloadable version of the US Army’s Long-Range Surveillance Unit Operations Field Manual. (FM 7-93) This manual provides doctrine, tactics, techniques, and procedures on how long-range surveillance units perform combat operations as a part of the Army's new battlefield surveillance brigades.
- LRSU: Eyes of the Commander by Staff Sergeants Brent W. Dick and Kevin M. Lydon
- "Riding With the Posse Part I" By Mike Gifford
- International Special Training Center and NATO celebrate 30 years of teaching special forces. (July 2, 2009) By: Maj. Jennifer Johnson, 7th Army Joint Multinational Training Command Public Affairs.
