= Reconnaissance and surveillance squadron =

A reconnaissance and surveillance squadron was a specialized unit within the US Army's battlefield surveillance brigade (BfSB) that blends ground cavalry troops with an elite long-range surveillance (LRS) airborne infantry company, continuing the US Army's march toward a modular force.

The reconnaissance and surveillance squadron (R&S squadron) consisted of a headquarters troop, (Company C) LRS unit (Airborne Infantry Company) for strategic-level long-range reconnaissance and surveillance missions (the backbone of the R&S units and the BfSB), two ground (Troops A and B) cavalry troops for basic tactical reconnaissance taskings and the R&S squadron mounted quick reaction force (QRF) and ready reaction force (RRF) security force (SECFOR), dismounted QRF and RRF SECFOR, and one line infantry company responsible for the R&S squadron Base SECFOR.

== Transformation ==
Former units consisted of one active component and two inactive detachments, there are now both Active-duty and National Guard Surveillance Brigades, each having a specific Table of Organization and Equipment.

The changes made were all part of an Army-wide transition to the Army modular force, future-concept ("Grow The Army Plan" of modernization) proposed by US Army Chief of Staff General Peter Schoomaker in 2007. The plan calls for ten Surveillance Brigades, three of which are active units: the 504th BfSB at Fort Hood, Texas; the 525th BfSB at Fort Bragg, North Carolina, and the 201st BfSB at Fort Lewis, Washington. The planned fourth active BfSB to have been stationed at Ft. Polk, Louisiana, had its activation cancelled. The remaining seven BfSB's are designated to the Army National Guard: the 58th BfSB from Maryland, the 67th BFSB from Nebraska, the 71st BfSB from Texas, the 142nd BfSB from Alabama, the 219th BfSB from Indiana, the 297th BfSB from Alaska, and the 560th BfSB from Georgia, all of which are moving to the objective designs by the scheduled completion of the Grow The Army Plan by fiscal year 2013.

== Contrast with reconnaissance, surveillance, and target acquisition (RSTA) units ==
The BfSB's R&S Squadron and specifically its elite LRS unit (Airborne Infantry "Recon" Company) are not to be confused with the new Army concept of elite reconnaissance, surveillance, and target acquisition (RSTA) units (a non-airborne capable cavalry basic tactical reconnaissance unit). RSTA units are a part of the Army-wide transfer to brigade combat teams, all combat divisions and separate brigades are transitioning to the RSTA format, the Reconnaissance & Surveillance Squadron is a specialized unit within the US Army's new Battlefield Surveillance Brigade (BfSB) that blends ground cavalry troops with an elite Long Range Surveillance (LRS) Airborne Infantry Company for the purpose of executing strategic level long range surveillance missions deep within enemy lines.

RSTA units are not airborne capable, whereas all LRS units are (exceptions being the RSTA squadron of the 4th BCT (Airborne), 25th Infantry Division; the 173rd Airborne BCT; and the four in the 82nd Airborne Division).

By doctrine, RSTA units do not require their leadership positions to be filled by Ranger qualified officers and NCOs as LRS units do in addition to many more specialized skill qualifications through extensive training.

== Training ==
LRSs are Airborne Forces and most leadership positions are filled by Ranger qualified officers and NCOs. LRS leaders typically undergo the Reconnaissance and Surveillance Leaders Course (RSLC) at Fort Benning, where they learn long-range land navigation, communications, intelligence, vehicle identification, survival, and operational techniques.

LRS troopers are often graduates of other specialized schools including: the U.S. Army Sniper School, Special Operations Target Interdiction Course (SOITC), US Army Ranger School, Waterborne Infiltration Course (WIC), Special Forces Combat Diver Qualification Course, HALO, Reconnaissance Surveillance Leaders Course RSLC (Formerly designated as the Long Range Surveillance Leaders Course (LRSLC)), Pathfinder, Air Assault School, Jumpmaster, Survival, Evasion, Resistance and Escape (SERE). Long Range Surveillance Combat Medics, similar to the 75th Ranger Regiment are required to graduate the Special Operations Medicine Course and many US Army LRS Troopers attend the International Special Training Center (ISTC)'s, the ISTC trains NATO Special Operations Forces, and similar type units, in advanced individual Patrolling, Battlefield Medicine, Close Quarter Battle, Sniper, Survival, Planning, and Recognition Skills. It was established in 1979, and first called the International Long Range Reconnaissance Patrol School (ILRRPS) formerly located in Weingarten, Germany and later move to Pfullendorf, Germany.

US Army LRS units conduct training exercises and exchange programs with various US allies. In recent years these exercises have included deployments to England, Germany, France, Hungary, and Italy. Joint training exercises have involved units from British TA SAS, France's 13 RDP, Belgium's ESR, Italy's 9 Para Assault Regiment, and Germany's Fernspählehrkompanie 200 Long Range Scout Companies or FSLK200 (roughly translated: Surveillance and Reconnaissance Instruction Company 200).

== See also ==
- The Battlefield Surveillance Brigade (BfSB)
- The US Army's Long Range Surveillance (LRS)
- Multifunctional Reconnaissance Company (MFRC)
