= Reconnaissance, surveillance, and target acquisition =

Military command and control system

Reconnaissance, surveillance, and target acquisition (RSTA) squadrons are a type of unit in the United States Army. These are cavalry squadrons (though in infantry brigade combat teams (IBCT)s they typically contain at least one dismounted infantry troop), and act at the squadron (battalion) level as a reconnaissance unit for their parent brigade combat teams. These RSTA squadrons continue on the Recondo legacy of the Vietnam era Long Range Reconnaissance Patrols (LRRP), however, compared to the LRRPs they are often assigned additional non-reconnaissance responsibilities such as battlespace ownership. As of 2025, RSTA squadrons in IBCTs are in the process of being deactivated; instead each infantry battalion will gain a Multipurpose Company (MPC) and the dismounted reconnaissance troop is replaced with a Multifunctional Reconnaissance Company (MFRCs) for providing brigade-level reconnaissance.

Additionally, RSTA is a doctrine that groups the tasks of reconnaissance, surveillance and target acquisition conducted by the Department of Defense (United States). RSTA supports military operations at a strategic (national defense policy), operational (theater level), or tactical (individual unit) level, either by dedicated RSTA forces or those which possess the capability.

== The RSTA squadron ==
As part of its modernization and reorganization plan, the US Army has transitioned to the use of a modular brigade combat team (BCT) scheme. For each of its three main types of BCTs, whether an infantry brigade combat team (IBCT), armored brigade combat team (ABCT), or Stryker brigade combat team (SBCT), there is a reconnaissance squadron which is tasked with performing reconnaissance and security missions for the BCT. Related to these units were reconnaissance and surveillance squadrons, which operated as part of battlefield surveillance brigades; however since 2015 all BfSBs have been converted into expeditionary military intelligence brigades or inactivated.

The primary task of the RSTA squadron is to carry out reconnaissance and security missions for its parent BCT or for higher commands, whether as part of offensive or defensive operations. Reconnaissance missions can include area, route, zone, and reconnaissance-in-force. Security missions can include screening (whether stationary or mobile), guard, cover, area security and local security. When necessary, the squadron can be augmented with additional forces to help in carrying out its missions.

=== ABCT squadron ===
The ABCT cavalry squadron is composed of a headquarters troop, two cavalry troops (transitioning to three cavalry troops), an armored company, and a forward support company attached from the brigade support battalion.

- The headquarters troop includes a command group, the troop headquarters section, the squadron primary staff, a medical platoon, an attached fire support cell, and a tactical air control party. Total strength includes 149 personnel, two Bradley Fighting Vehicles, three M577A1 Command Post Carriers, two M577A1 Medical Treatment Vehicles, eight M113A3 Ambulances, fourteen HMMWVs, and six FMTVs, with appropriate equipment carried in additional trailers.
- Each cavalry troop consists of a headquarters section, two scout platoons, and a mortar section. The headquarters section includes the troop commander, executive officer, first sergeant, unit supply, and attached fire support team and combat medics. Each scout platoon consists of three M3 Bradley vehicles (each carrying two scouts) and five HMMWVs equipped with long-range multisensor systems, with plans to transition each troop to have six M3 vehicles. The mortar section has two 120-mm mortars and a fire direction center. Total strength for each cavalry troop includes 93 personnel, seven Bradley vehicles, eleven HMMWVs, two M1064 mortar carriers, an M113 Armored Personnel Carrier, an M577A1 Command Post Carrier, and an FMTV.
- The armor company consists of a headquarters element and three tank platoons. The headquarters consists of two tanks commanded by the company commander and executive officer, with attached fire support team and combat medics. Total strength includes 62 personnel, fourteen M1 Abrams, an M577A1 Command Post Carrier, two HMMWVs and an FMTV.

The ABCT Cavalry squadron can fight against comparable armor forces, including tanks and other armored fighting vehicles, in order to conduct its missions. However it has significant logistical and maintenance requirements and the use of different vehicle types creates a mix in survivability between platforms. The limited number of scout platoons reduces the size of the area the troop can operate in.

=== IBCT squadron ===
The IBCT cavalry squadron includes a headquarters troop, two mounted cavalry troops, and a dismounted reconnaissance troop. A forward support company will also be attached from the brigade support battalion for sustainment purposes. In squadrons supporting an airborne brigade combat team, 100% of the RSTA soldiers are qualified paratroopers.

- The headquarters troop includes a command group, the troop headquarters section, the squadron primary staff, a medical platoon, an attached fire support cell, and a tactical air control party. Total strength includes 130 personnel, seventeen HMMWVs, ten M997 Ambulances, three M1117 armored security vehicles, and five FMTVs, with appropriate equipment carried in additional trailers.
- Each mounted cavalry troop consists of a headquarters section, three scout platoons and a mortar section. The headquarters section includes the troop commander, executive officer, first sergeant, unit supply, and attached fire support team and combat medics. Each scout platoon has two HMMWVs, each with a crew of three of which one is available for dismounted scouting. The scout platoons are equipped with six M220 TOW-2 anti-armor systems firing the BGM-71 TOW missile backed up by FGM-148 Javelin anti-tank missiles; four of the six HMMWVs are also equipped with the Long-Range Advanced Scout Surveillance System. The mortar section consists of two HMMWV-towed 120mm mortars and a fire direction center. Total strength includes 92 personnel, nine HMMWVs, and two FMTVs.
- The dismounted reconnaissance troop includes a headquarters section, two scout platoons, a mortar section, a sniper squad and attached fire support team; it can also include up to eight two-man dismounted forward observer teams. Unlike the other troops, the DRT is an infantry element, though task-organized as cavalry (e.g. a "troop"). The headquarters section includes the troop commander, executive officer, first sergeant, unit supply, and attached fire support team and combat medics. Each scout platoon is divided into three sections, while the sniper squad consists of a squad leader, two three-man sniper teams, and an HMMWV. The dismounted reconnaissance troop is a specialized unit with air and water assets to allow for clandestine infiltration. The mortar section consists of a six-man 60mm mortar section that can be split into two sections and is attached to either of the two scout platoons or the headquarters section, plus a fire direction center. Due to the numerous 'F7' coded Pathfinder slots and trained personnel, the DRT is often used as the squadron and brigade's pathfinder element. While largely lacking organic transport, the dismounted reconnaissance troop is easily deployable from both fixed-wing and rotary-wing aircraft. Total strength includes 79 personnel, four HMMWVs and an FMTV. The DRT also has a Raven unmanned aerial vehicle (UAV) which is typically used to support either of the two scout platoons or to surveil a separate named area of interest; some DRTs have utilized other platform such as the Instant Eye sUAS.

The IBCT Cavalry squadron is able to support its parent unit through the combination of the firepower and mobility offered by its mounted forces and the ability to operate in complex and difficult terrain with its dismounted forces. However the mix of mounted and dismounted troops creates a mismatch in maneuvering ability and may require augmentation with additional transportation resources.

In 2024, 2nd Brigade Combat Team, 101st Airborne Division (Air Assault) began prototype testing of the mobile brigade combat team (MBCT) concept; in which the RSTA squadron's dismounted reconnaissance troop was reflagged as a Multifunctional Reconnaissance Company (MFRC). In comparison to the DRT, the MFRC has fewer snipers but more UAS and cUAS assets, as well as an organic air-defense capability in the form of a Stinger team. By 2025, the MBCT concept had been adopted as the new standard, with 25 IBCTs to be transitioned to MBCTs by the end of 2027. As part of this transition, the cavalry squadrons of every IBCT will be deactivated, with their former C troops (DRTs) becoming the basis for standing up new MFRCs to fill the role of a dedicated infantry reconnaissance formation to answer a brigade commander's priority intelligence requirements (PIRs).

=== SBCT squadron ===
The SBCT cavalry squadron includes a headquarters troop and three cavalry troops, along with a forward support company attached from the brigade support battalion.

- The headquarters troop includes a command group, the troop headquarters section, the squadron primary staff, a medical platoon, an attached fire support cell, and a tactical air control party. Total strength includes 131 personnel, six Stryker CVs, fifteen HMMWVs, and seven FMTVs, with appropriate equipment carried in additional trailers.
- Each cavalry troop consists of a headquarters section, two scout platoons and a mortar section. The headquarters section includes the troop commander, executive officer, first sergeant, unit supply, and attached fire support team and combat medics. Each scout platoon has four Stryker RVs (with plans to transition to six Stryker RVs) and four FGM-148 Javelin anti-tank missiles. The mortar section consists of two Stryker MCVs and a fire direction center. Total strength includes 92 personnel, one Stryker CV, thirteen Stryker RVs, two Stryker MCVs, and two FTMVs.

The SBCT cavalry squadron can cover a large area thanks to its three cavalry troops equipped with extremely mobile Stryker vehicles. The squadron is limited though in its ability to conduct dismounted reconnaissance or engage enemy armor units. The four-vehicle cavalry troops also face additional risks during route reconnaissance as individual Strykers are forced to reconnoiter lateral routes and terrain adjacent to the route.

RSTA line troops are a mix of 19D (cavalry scout) and 11B (Infantryman) MOS's, which serve as scouts and snipers. Also included are 11C (Indirect Fire Infantryman), which operate a 60 mm M224 Mortar Section, as well as various intelligence and communications soldiers. The dismounted reconnaissance troops consist of 11Bs in the scout platoons and sniper section; 11Cs in the mortar section; and 11Bs, 25Cs (Radio Operator-Maintainers), 74Ds (CBRN Specialists), and 92Ys (Supply Specialists) in the headquarters section, led by 11A officers and an 11Z 1SG. Common training pipelines include the Reconnaissance and Surveillance Leaders Course (RSLC), Cavalry Leader's Course, sniper school, Ranger school, pathfinder school, and in applicable IBCTs, air assault school and airborne school.

== RSTA units in the United States Army ==
=== Active Component RSTA Cavalry Units ===
- 1st Cavalry
  - 1-1st Cavalry, 2nd Armored Brigade Combat Team, 1st Armored Division, Fort Bliss
  - 2–1st Cavalry, 1st Stryker Brigade Combat Team, 4th Infantry Division, Fort Carson
  - 5–1st Cavalry, 1st Infantry Brigade Combat Team, 11th Airborne Division, Fort Wainwright
  - 6–1st Cavalry, 1st Stryker Brigade Combat Team, 1st Armored Division, Fort Bliss
  - 8–1st Cavalry, 2nd Stryker Brigade Combat Team, 2nd Infantry Division, Fort Lewis
- 2nd Cavalry
  - 4–2nd Cavalry, 2nd Cavalry Regiment, Vilseck, Germany
- 3rd Cavalry Regiment
  - 4-3rd Cavalry, 3rd Cavalry Regiment, Fort Hood, Texas
- 4th Cavalry
  - 1–4th Cavalry, 1st Armored Brigade Combat Team, 1st Infantry Division, Fort Riley
  - 3–4th Cavalry, 3rd Infantry Brigade Combat Team, 25th Infantry Division, Schofield Barracks, Hawaii
  - 5–4th Cavalry, 2nd Armored Brigade Combat Team, 1st Infantry Division, Fort Riley
- 7th Cavalry
  - 1–7th Cavalry, 1st Armored Brigade Combat Team, 1st Cavalry Division, Fort Hood
  - 3–7th Cavalry, 2nd Armored Brigade Combat Team, 3rd Infantry Division, Fort Stewart
  - ~~4–7th Cavalry, 1st Armored Brigade Combat Team, 2nd Infantry Division, Korea~~ (Rotational ABCTs, now take over the role of 4-7 every 9 months. It only exists on paper)
  - 5–7th Cavalry, 1st Armored Brigade Combat Team, 3rd Infantry Division, Fort Stewart
- 8th Cavalry
  - 6–8th Cavalry, 4th Armored Brigade Combat Team, 3rd Infantry Division, Fort Stewart
- 9th Cavalry
  - 4–9th Cavalry, 2nd Armored Brigade Combat Team, 1st Cavalry Division, Fort Hood
  - 6–9th Cavalry, 3rd Armored Brigade Combat Team, 1st Cavalry Division, Fort Hood
- 10th Cavalry
  - 4–10th Cavalry, 3rd Armored Brigade Combat Team, 4th Infantry Division, Fort Carson
- 13th Cavalry
  - 1–13th Cavalry, 3rd Infantry Brigade Combat Team, 1st Armored Division, Fort Bliss
  - 2-13th Cavalry, 4th Arnored Brigade Combat Team, 1st Armored Division, Fort Bliss
- 14th Cavalry
  - 1–14th Cavalry, 1st Stryker Brigade Combat Team, 2nd Infantry Division, Fort Lewis
  - 2–14th Cavalry, 2nd Stryker Brigade Combat Team, 25th Infantry Division, Schofield Barracks
- 32nd Cavalry
  - 1–32nd Cavalry, 1st Infantry Brigade Combat Team, 101st Airborne Division, Fort Campbell, Kentucky
- 33rd Cavalry
  - 1–33rd Cavalry, 3rd Infantry Brigade Combat Team, 101st Airborne Division, Fort Campbell, Kentucky
- 40th Cavalry
  - 1–40th Cavalry, 2nd Infantry Brigade Combat Team, 11th Airborne Division, Fort Richardson, Alaska
- 61st Cavalry
  - 1–61st Cavalry, 4th Infantry Brigade Combat Team, 101st Airborne Division, Fort Campbell, Kentucky
  - 3–61st Cavalry, 2nd Stryker Brigade Combat Team, 4th Infantry Division, Fort Carson, Colorado
- 71st Cavalry
  - 1–71st Cavalry, 1st Infantry Brigade Combat Team, 10th Mountain Division, Fort Drum, New York
  - 3–71st Cavalry, 3rd Infantry Brigade Combat Team, 10th Mountain Division, Fort Drum, New York
- 73rd Cavalry
  - 1–73rd Cavalry, 2nd Infantry Brigade Combat Team, 82nd Airborne Division, Fort Bragg, North Carolina
  - 3–73rd Cavalry, 1st Infantry Brigade Combat Team, 82nd Airborne Division, Fort Bragg, North Carolina
  - 5–73rd Cavalry, 3rd Infantry Brigade Combat Team, 82nd Airborne Division, Fort Bragg, North Carolina
- 75th Cavalry
  - 1–75th Cavalry, 2nd Infantry Brigade Combat Team, 101st Airborne Division, Fort Campbell, Kentucky (Created out of 3rd Battalion, 502nd Infantry Regiment)
- 89th Cavalry
  - 1–89th Cavalry, 2nd Infantry Brigade Combat Team, 10th Mountain Division, Fort Drum, New York
  - 3–89th Cavalry, 4th Infantry Brigade Combat Team, 10th Mountain Division, Fort Polk, Louisiana
- 91st Cavalry
  - 1–91st Cavalry, 173rd Airborne Brigade Combat Team, Grafenwoehr, Germany

=== Army National Guard RSTA Cavalry Units ===
- 18th Cavalry
  - 1st Squadron, 18th Cavalry (RSTA), 79th Infantry Brigade Combat Team, California Army National Guard
- 82nd Cavalry
  - 1st Squadron, 82nd Cavalry (RSTA), 81st Stryker Brigade Combat Team, Oregon Army National Guard
- 94th Cavalry Regiment
  - 1st Squadron, 94th Cavalry (RSTA), 1st Armored Brigade Combat Team, 34th Infantry Division, Minnesota Army National Guard
- 101st Cavalry
  - 2nd Squadron, 101st Cavalry (RSTA), 27th Infantry Brigade Combat Team, New York Army National Guard
- 102nd Cavalry
  - 1st Squadron, 102nd Cavalry (RSTA), 44th Infantry Brigade Combat Team, 42nd Infantry Division New Jersey Army National Guard (formerly 2nd Battalion, 102nd Armor)
- 104th Cavalry
  - 2nd Squadron, 104th Cavalry (RSTA), 56th Stryker Brigade Combat Team, 28th Infantry Division, Pennsylvania Army National Guard
- 105th Cavalry
  - 1st Squadron, 105th Cavalry (RSTA), 32nd Infantry Brigade Combat Team, Wisconsin Army National Guard formerly 2–128th Infantry (2001–2007) and 632nd Armor (1963–2001)
- 106th Cavalry
  - 2nd Squadron, 106th Cavalry (RSTA), 33rd Infantry Brigade Combat Team, Illinois Army National Guard
- 107th Cavalry
  - 2nd Squadron, 107th Cavalry (RSTA), 37th Infantry Brigade Combat Team, Ohio Army National Guard
- 108th Cavalry
  - 1st Squadron, 108th Cavalry (RSTA), 48th Infantry Brigade Combat Team, Georgia Army National Guard (formerly 1–108th Armor)
  - 2nd Squadron, 108th Cavalry (RSTA), 256th Infantry Brigade, Louisiana Army National Guard (formerly 1-156th AR) headquartered in Shreveport
  - 3rd Squadron, 108th Cavalry Reconnaissance & Surveillance (R&S), 560th Battlefield Surveillance Brigade, Georgia Army National Guard (reflagged as 3-121st Infantry with the disbanding of the 560th BSB)
- 112th Cavalry
  - 1st Squadron, 112th Cavalry (RSTA), 72nd Infantry Brigade Combat Team, 36th Infantry Division, Texas Army National Guard
- 113th Cavalry Regiment
  - 1st Squadron, 113th Cavalry (RSTA), 34th Infantry Division, Iowa Army National Guard
- 116th Cavalry Brigade Combat Team
  - 2nd Squadron, 116th Cavalry, 116th Cavalry (Heavy) Brigade Combat Team, 34th Infantry Division, Idaho Army National Guard
- 124th Cavalry "MARS MEN"
  - 1st Squadron, 124th Cavalry (RSTA), 56th Infantry Brigade Combat Team, 36th Infantry Division, Waco, TX "Out Front" (not to be confused with 1–124th Inf, FLARNG)
  - ~~3rd Squadron, 124th Cavalry (R&S), 71st Battlefield Surveillance Brigade, Wylie, TX~~ (formerly 1–112th Armor Regiment, 36th Infantry Division) unit was deactivated 8 July 2017.
- 126th Cavalry
  - 1st Squadron, 126th Cavalry (RSTA), 37th Infantry Brigade Combat Team, 38th Infantry Division, Wyoming, MI "HUNTERS"
- 134th Cavalry
  - 1st Squadron, 134th Cavalry (R&S), 67th Battlefield Surveillance Brigade, Nebraska Army National Guard
- 150th Cavalry
  - 1st Squadron, 150th Cavalry (RSTA), 30th Heavy Brigade Combat Team, West Virginia Army National Guard
- 151st Cavalry
  - 1st Squadron, 151st Cavalry, 39th Infantry Brigade Combat Team, Arkansas National Guard (previously 3–153rd infantry)
- 152nd Cavalry
  - 1st Squadron, 152nd Cavalry (RSTA), 76th Infantry Brigade Combat Team, Indiana Army National Guard (previously 1–151 Inf)
  - 2nd Squadron, 152nd Cavalry (R&S), 219th Battlefield Surveillance Brigade, Indiana Army National Guard
- 153d Cavalry
  - 1st Squadron, 153rd Cavalry, 53rd Infantry Brigade Combat Team, Florida Army National Guard (previously 3–124th Infantry)
    - The dismounted reconnaissance troop of 1-153 CAV is Troop C, (formerly A Co. 3/124th Infantry).
- 158th Cavalry
  - ~~1st Squadron, 158th Cavalry (R&S), 58th Battlefield Surveillance Brigade, Maryland Army National Guard~~. (formerly 1-158th Cavalry (RSTA), 58th Brigade Combat Team, 29th Infantry Division); unit was inactivated on 7 November 2015.
- 167th Cavalry
  - ~~1st Squadron, 167th Cavalry, 34th Infantry Division, Nebraska Army National Guard~~. 1-167th Cavalry was reorganized into the 1st Squadron, 134th Cavalry (R&S) in 2008.
- 172nd Cavalry
  - 1st Squadron, 172nd Cavalry (RSTA), 86th Infantry Brigade Combat Team (Mountain), Vermont Army National Guard.
- 182nd Cavalry
  - 1st Squadron, 182nd Cavalry (RSTA), 26th Infantry Division, Massachusetts Army National Guard; 26th subsequently inactivated, lineage perpetuated by the 26th BCT, 29th Infantry Division, later 26th BCT, 42nd Infantry Division, then reorganized and redesignated as the 26th Maneuver Enhancement Brigade, consisting of a mix of support units.
- 183rd Cavalry
  - 2nd Squadron, 183rd Cavalry (RSTA), 116th Infantry Brigade Combat Team, 29th Infantry Division, Virginia Army National Guard (formerly 3rd Battalion, 111th ADA)
- 263rd Cavalry
  - 1st Squadron, 263rd Cavalry (RSTA), 218th Brigade Combat Team (M) South Carolina Army National Guard (Brigade reorganized as the 218th Maneuver Enhancement Brigade, a mix of engineer, military police and chemical units.)
- 278th Cavalry
  - 3rd Squadron, 278th Armored Cavalry Regiment, Tennessee Army National Guard
- 299th Cavalry
  - 1st Squadron, 299th Cavalry Regiment, 29th Infantry Brigade Combat Team, Hawaii Army National Guard (formerly the 2nd Battalion, 299th Infantry Regiment)
- 303rd Cavalry
  - 1st Squadron, 303rd Cavalry Regiment, 41st Infantry Brigade Combat Team, Washington Army National Guard (formerly Troop E, 303rd Cavalry Regiment)

== RSTA as a doctrine ==
According to JP 3-55, RSTA operations are concerned not only with the collection of military intelligence, but ensuring that it is accurate, relevant, and distributed in a timely manner to the appropriate user. This includes maintaining operational security (OPSEC) so that critical information cannot be exploited by an opposing force. Likewise, RSTA can play a role in operational deception (OPDEC) operations to confuse opposing forces.

Across the strategic, operational and tactical level, RSTA operations fall within three areas:

=== Indications and warnings ===
Indications and warnings (I&W) are "intelligence activities intended to detect and report time-sensitive intelligence information on foreign developments that could involve a threat to the United States or allied and/or coalition military, political, or economic interests or to US citizens abroad." On a strategic and operational level, RSTA operations may provide continuous surveillance or as-required reconnaissance, in order to provide warnings of impending threats or attacks, as well as to monitor compliance with international agreements.

=== Planning and employment ===
Strategically, RSTA planning and employment operations are used to support the planning of military operations, by monitoring foreign nations' centers of warmaking capability, and providing information on enemy system capabilities, locations, and installations for the National Target Base and other target lists. This information is used to assist in formulation of the U.S. military's Single Integrated Operational Plan, Limited Attack Option plan, Unified Command Plan, and Joint Strategic Capabilities Plans.

Operationally, RSTA operations are similar to both the strategic and tactical levels, in that they provide commanders with data on areas such as environment, organization, infrastructure, and enemy forces to assist in planning theater wide operations.

Tactically, RSTA operations provide detailed information about enemy orders of battle, movement plans, offensive and defensive capabilities, terrain, and enemy disposition. RSTA units provide target detection and acquisition ( and in some cases, elimination), and real-time intelligence and surveillance.

=== Assessment ===
At all three levels of command, RSTA units provide combat assessment before, during and after military operations. This includes tasks such as bomb damage assessment or determining if an OPDEC mission has succeeded. RSTA assessment can help to decide if a military operation was successful in achieving its objectives, whether additional resources need to be directed to complete the objectives or if they can be redirected to another operation.

== See also ==
- Recondo
- Command and control
- Fingerspitzengefühl
- C^{4}ISTAR
- CARVER matrix
- Network-centric warfare
