= United States Army Reconnaissance and Surveillance Leaders Course =

U.S. Army Reconnaissance and Surveillance Leaders Course (RSLC)
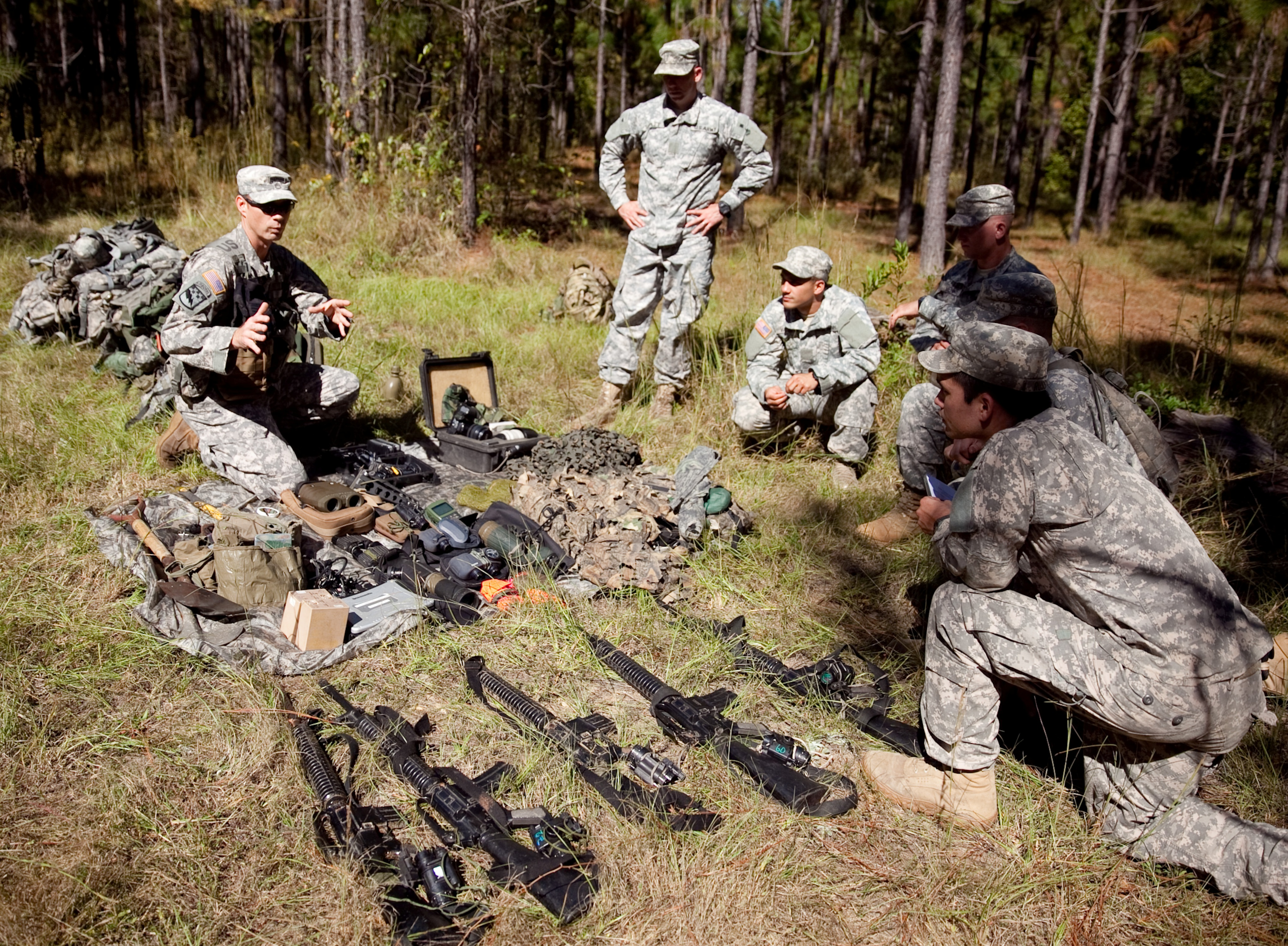
- An instructor goes over the equipment packing list for surface and sub-surface surveillance with students
- Active: 1986—present
- Country: United States of America
- Branch: United States Army
- Type: Military training
- Role: Special skills training
- Part of: Airborne and Ranger Training Brigade, U.S. Army Infantry School
- Garrison/HQ: Fort Benning, Georgia
- Motto: "In Orbe Terrum Non Visi"

Insignia
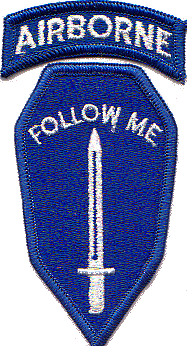
- Shoulder sleeve insignia of the Airborne and Ranger Training Brigade

- Beret flash of the Airborne and Ranger Training Brigade

- Airborne and Ranger Training Brigade Airborne Background Trimming

United States Army Reconnaissance and Surveillance Leaders Course (RSLC) (formerly known as the Long Range Surveillance Leaders Course, or LRSLC) is a 29-day (four weeks and one day) school designed on mastering reconnaissance fundamentals of officers and non-commissioned officers eligible for assignments to those units whose primary mission is to conduct reconnaissance and surveillance, target acquisition, and combat assessment operations. RSLC is taught by the 4th Ranger Training Battalion, Airborne and Ranger Training Brigade. The school is open to Soldiers, Marines, Sailors and Airmen to train them to expert levels in reconnaissance, surveillance, target acquisition, battle damage assessment, communications, planning, foreign vehicle identification, and other skills. The school was originally created to serve leaders from Long Range Surveillance Units (LRSU's), but now provides the specific reconnaissance training needed to ensure the effectiveness of small unit reconnaissance elements (teams and squads) for the U.S. Army and joint force. Given the training focus and difficulty of the RSLC, the school is still commonly attended by operators from U.S. Army Special Forces, the 75th Ranger Regiment's Regimental Reconnaissance Company, U.S. Army Civil Affairs (95th Civil Affairs Brigade (Special Operations) (Airborne) and 83d Civil Affairs Battalion), Navy SEALs, and Marine reconnaissance units; today's students also come from more conventional infantry, Stryker and armored Brigade Combat Teams (BCT). Following the US Army decision to disband US Army LRS companies, the reconnaissance fundamentals taught in the course also provides U.S. military commanders the ability to preserve key LRS skills and abilities within the conventional force.

Given the importance of timely, accurate and relevant battlefield information, U.S. Military commanders require reconnaissance professionals be well-trained, highly skilled and disciplined, and capable of operating forward of BCTs. The course curriculum is primarily designed to train small unit leaders assigned to reconnaissance formations to include infantry, Stryker and armored BCT cavalry squadrons; infantry, Stryker, and Combined Arms Battalion (CAB) scout platoons; and special operations forces. The RSLC program of Instruction (PoI) is continuously assessed and refined to ensure it meets these needs, the needs of reconnaissance units, and those of a U.S. Joint force at war.

== History ==
In 1958, the commanding general of the 101st Airborne Division, Major General William Westmoreland, noticed a failing of proficiency and initiative in squad, fireteam, and patrol leaders during an exercise code named White Cloud. General (GEN) Westmoreland was a veteran of the Invasion of Normandy and realized the importance of small unit leaders and individuals who had been separated from their parent units to take action against superior enemy forces. GEN Westmoreland decided that his division needed relevant training to rectify their deficiencies before their deployment.

The U.S. Army sent many of their officers and senior non-commissioned officers to Ranger School. However, not every unit leader could be sent to the course. Second Lieutenant Donald Bernstein suggested that some of the 101st Airborne's Ranger trained personnel start a school for the entire division in small unit tactics. When the idea was brought to GEN Westmoreland he recommended that Major Lewis L. Millett command the two-week school.

The course was named the Recondo School, a combination of the words "reconnaissance" and "doughboy" or "commando." From the early 1960s through the mid-1980s, there was more than one Recondo School in the U.S. Army. The U.S. Military Academy, the Military Assistance Command, Vietnam (MACV), the 5th Infantry Division, the 25th Infantry Division, the 82nd Airborne Division, the 101st Airborne Division, and the XVIII Airborne Corps all had their own Recondo Schools with their own course of instruction.

MACV's Recondo School was a three-week course conducted in Vietnam and was taught by members of the 5th Special Forces Group. The first week of training focused on classroom instruction, the second week on air operations, and the third week used real reconnaissance missions to teach students the critical skills needed to successfully infiltrate, observer, report, evade, and extract using small unit tactics in a jungle environment. This real-world training endeared the MACV Recondo School with the nickname, "The deadliest school on Earth." The other U.S. Army Recondo Schools had a two or three week curriculum conducted at the home garrison of the perspective unit and focused on training students in the fundamentals of:

5th Infantry Division Recondo School training overview video, circa 1970

- Communications
- Land navigation
- Mountaineering
- Patrolling
- Tracking
- Pathfinder techniques
- Call for indirect fire
- Combat demolition
- Hand-to-hand combat
- Survival and evasion

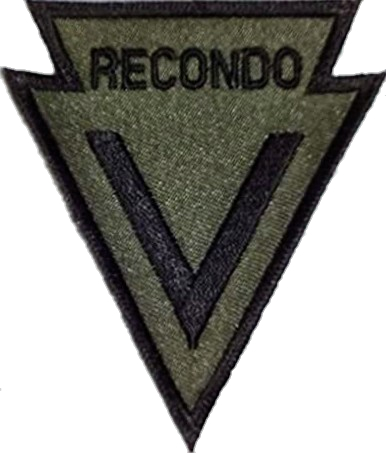
Vietnam Era RECONDO Patch

The insignia of the Recondo Schools, which was also worn as a patch on the right pocket of Recondo graduates, was an arrowhead pointing downwards to symbolize assault from the sky to the ground in the colors of black and white to signify operations by day and night. Although each Recondo School had its own insignia and patch, the downward-facing arrowhead and black and white theme remained the same.

The MACV Recondo School officially closed on 31 December 1970. The other U.S. Army division and corps Recondo Schools either carried-on with their curriculum or disbanded throughout the 1970s and '80s.

In 1986, the Long Range Surveillance Leaders Course was established to fill a void that existed in Ranger training when LRSUs were reactivated that same year. To fulfill this requirement, the course was initially designed to emphasize the mission essential tasks drawn from lessons learned from previous long-range reconnaissance patrol operations in the jungles of Southeast Asia. In 2002, the course was renamed the Reconnaissance and Surveillance Leader Course (RSLC) and was taught by the 4th Ranger Training Battalion prior to unit reorganization at the Maneuver Center of Excellence at Fort Benning. In 2019, the US Army Training and Doctrine Command decided to move RSLC back under the control of the 4th Ranger Training Battalion.

== Training ==
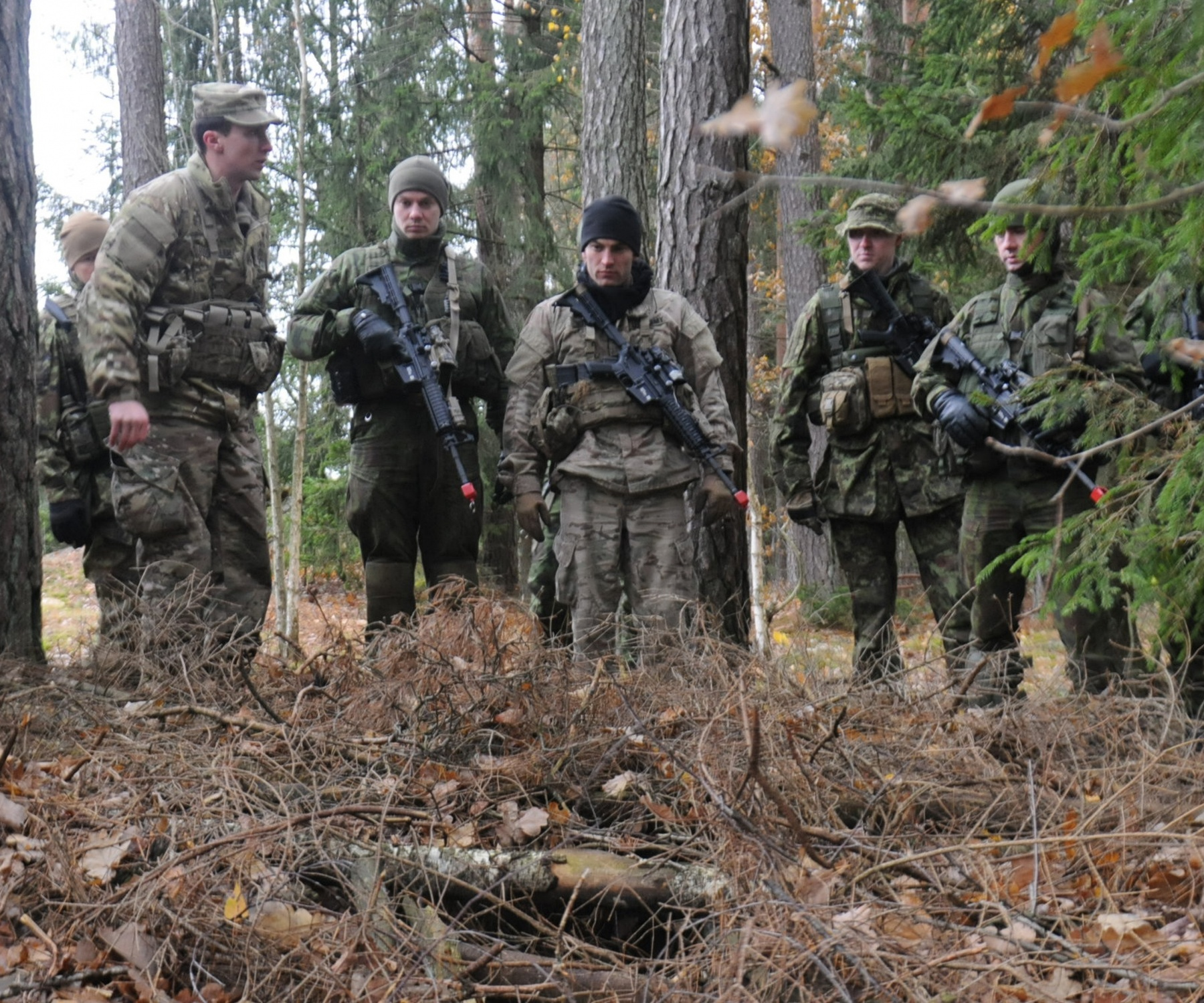
An instructor shows students the construction of a proper sub-surface hide-site during Phase 1 of RSLC's first overseas course in Lithuania, circa 2016

The RSLC is designed to provide instruction to students through resident instruction at Fort Benning, Georgia. Located on Camp Cornett at Fort Benning's Harmony Church cantonment area, the RSLC PoI is tailored to train and test the fundamentals of reconnaissance operations for Soldiers and leaders assigned to reconnaissance teams and squads. Therefore, priority for training is to team leaders and above (pay grades of E-4s and above) assigned oversight of small unit reconnaissance operations without prior reconnaissance training and experience. In addition to resident course instruction, the RSLC PoI provides opportunities to deliver menu-based training through mobile training teams at a requesting unit's home station location. Menu-based training enables unit commanders to meet specific reconnaissance focused training priorities without sacrificing other training needs in support of a unit's operational mission requirements. While resident course instruction has priority over menu-based MTT instruction, the RSLC cadre will work to meet every unit's training needs.

=== Phase 1 ===
During the first week, students execute a seven-hour land navigation course in which they move under load, cross-country, during daylight and limited visibility, covering approximately 15 kilometers. They receive an introduction to the fundamentals of reconnaissance and surveillance and are taught how to maximize the capabilities of the equipment in the Army's inventory such as optics, thermals, and cameras. Students learn how to camouflage themselves and equipment, stalking, and selection, occupation, and concealment of surveillance sites. The first week ends with an airborne operation that can accommodate both static line and Military Free-Fall qualified paratroopers.

=== Phase 2 ===
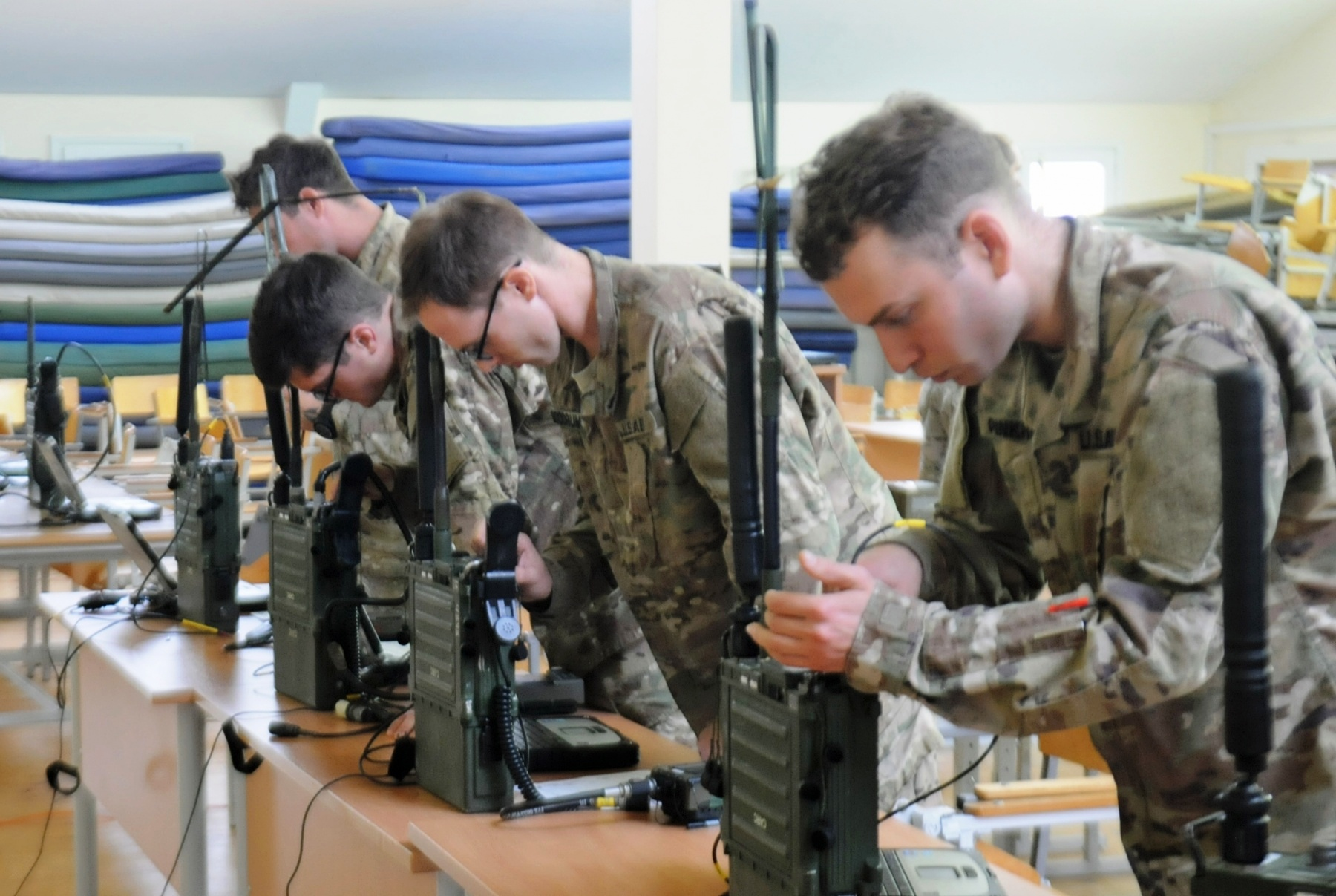
Students practice configuring their radios prior to communications exam during Phase 2 of RSLC

Week two begins with a two-day communications class that teaches students how to send messages and data across the frequency spectrum, utilizing High Frequency (HF), Very High Frequency (VHF), and Ultra High Frequency (UHF) radios. This skill enables students to send reports and pictures to their maneuver commander in near real time. Building on the training from the previous week, students conduct area and zone reconnaissance practical exercises to hone their field craft and improve their reporting formats. Students are also introduced to insertion and extraction techniques by conducting Fast Rope Insertion/Extraction System (FRIES) and Special Patrol Insertion/Extraction System (SPIES) training.

=== Phase 3 ===
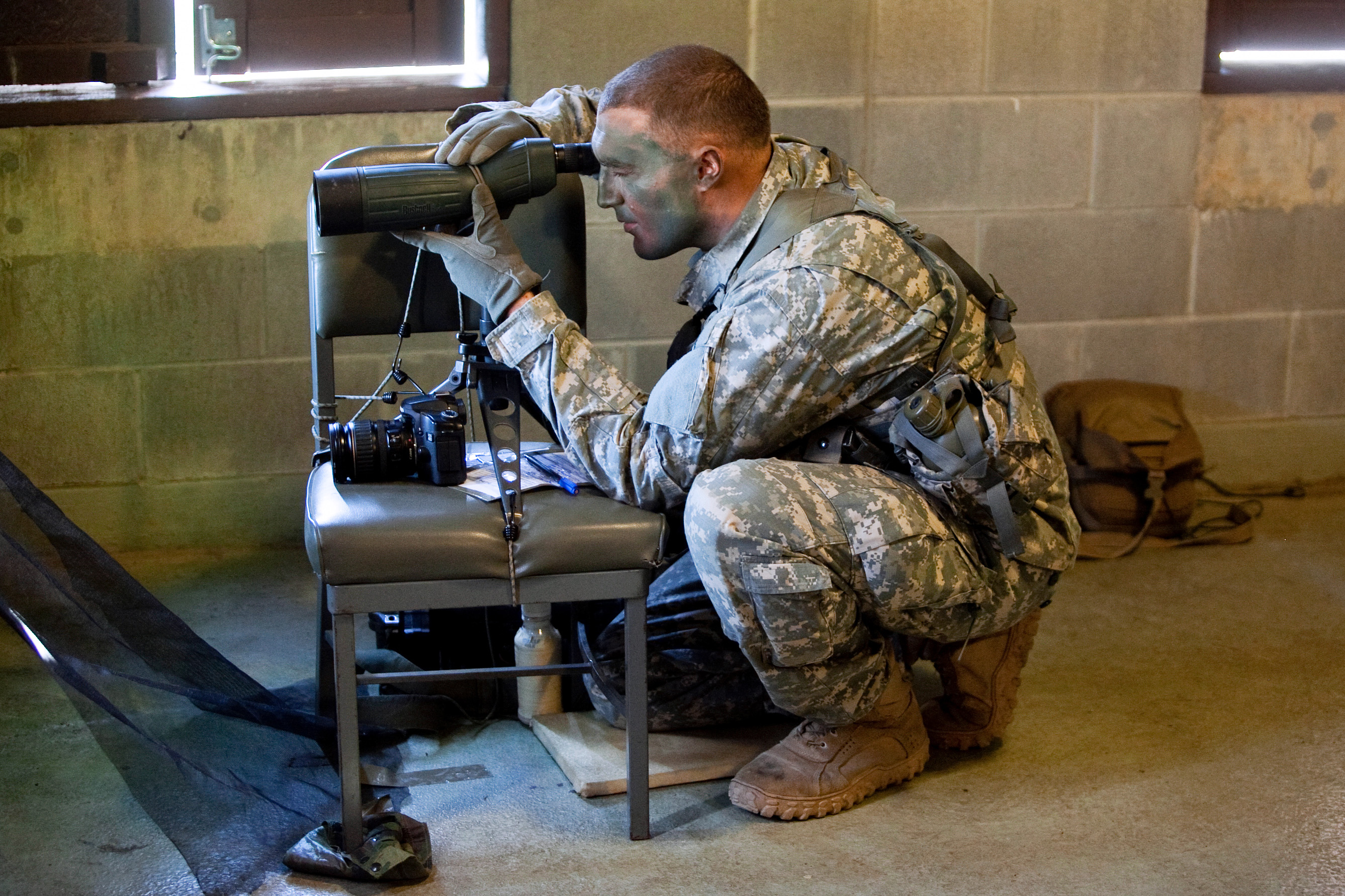
A student uses an optical rangefinder to observe an urban environment during Phase 3 of RSLC

The final two weeks are spent with students learning how to plan an operation using the Troop Leading Procedures (TLPs) and incorporating air movement, fires, and evasion and recovery planning. Following the orders process, students conduct a 48-hour non-graded Situational Training Exercise (STX) where they will execute the mission they just planned under the watchful eye of RSLC instructors, allowing the students to ask questions and receive assistance along the way. Once this mission is complete and After-Action Reviews (AARs) are conducted, the students go into isolation planning for their graded culminating Field Training Exercise (FTX). Throughout the FTX, students will execute and be graded on all the skills they learned from planning, reconnaissance and surveillance operations, intelligence reporting techniques, communications, fires, evasion and recovery, and small unit tactics to name a few.

The result is a graduate with the skill to plan and conduct a myriad of reconnaissance and surveillance operations, enhancing the ability of any brigade combat team. Upon successful completion of the RSLC course, U.S. Army graduates are awarded the Six Bravo (6B) additional skill identifier.

== See also ==
- Aerial reconnaissance
- Battlefield surveillance brigades in the United States Army
- Reconnaissance and surveillance squadron
- Reconnaissance vehicle
- Reconnaissance, surveillance, and target acquisition (United States)
- U.S. Army Reconnaissance Course
- U.S. Army Sniper Course
