= EGB =

EGB may refer to:

- Educación General Básica, the first phase of Education in Spain
- EGB Forces, a special operations force of the German Bundeswehr
- Erzgebirgsbahn, a German railway
- European Green Belt
