= EGB Forces =

Specialized operations force under Germany's Rapid Forces Division

- Spezialisierte Kräfte des Heeres mit Erweiterter Grundbefähigung (EGB)
- EGB unit badge
- Founded: 2007
- Country: Germany
- Branch: German Army
- Type: Specialized Forces
- Role: Airborne operations Counterinsurgency; Direct Action; Intelligence Operations; QRF capabilities
- Part of: Rapid Forces Division
- Garrison/HQ: Seedorf; Zweibrücken
- Mottos: Speed, surprise & violence of action

The EGB Forces (Specialized Army Forces with Expanded Capabilities) (German: Spezialisierte Kräfte des Heeres mit Erweiterter Grundbefähigung) is a specialized operations force of the German Bundeswehr, organized under the Rapid Forces Division.

== Background ==
In 2007 EGB Forces were established as a light infantry unit to close the gap between conventional infantry units and the Kommando Spezialkräfte. Therefore, each of the four paratrooper battalions established one specialized company to serve as an enhanced-skilled company. These battalions are now two regiments with companies.

In 2015 the specialized reconnaissance unit Fernspählehrkompanie 200 was merged with parts of the reconnaissance platoons of the brigade's recce companies.

== Selection and training ==
Personnel of all branches of the Bundeswehr may apply for the EGB Forces.

Prerequisites

- Minimum of four years of enlistment
- Completion of basic training and occupational specific training
- Completed security clearance
- Excellent physical fitness
- For sergeants and officers: Completed multi-year leadership training

Selection process

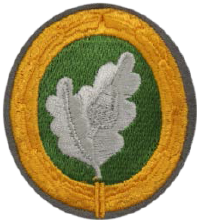
EGB Forces qualification badge

Completion of several tests which include an obstacle course, ruck march, swimming tests and numerous tests of physical or mental stamina. Successful completion of the selection process is followed by training for the occupation in the EGB Forces in the special operations school in Pfullendorf.

Training Before serving in the EGB Forces, soldiers attend a twelve-month training cycle which includes

- Advanced training in firearms
- Specialized infantry tactics
- Combatives
- Medical training
- SERE training

Upon completion of the training cycle, soldiers are awarded with the EGB Forces qualification badge and receive the Combat-Ready-status. Afterwards they are assigned to an EGB company.

During their career, soldiers of EGB Forces may receive advanced training in communications, weapons training, demolitions, advanced medical training, mountain training or training in amphibious operations.

== Mission and deployments ==
Tasks of EGB forces may include

- Personnel recovery
- Quick reaction force
- Direct action

Since their establishment EGB Forces were involved in Afghanistan as part of the International Security Assistance Force, the United Nations Multidimensional Integrated Stabilization Mission in Mali and as part of a capacity building mission in northern Iraq.

== See also ==
- 75th Ranger Regiment
