= Fernspählehrkompanie 200 =

Coordinates: 47°54′36″N 9°15′22″E

Deep Reconnaissance Company 200 Fernspählehrkompanie 200
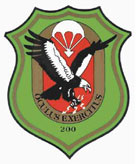
- Badge of Fernspählehrkompanie 200
- Active: 1962–2014
- Country: Germany
- Branch: German Army
- Type: Special operations capable forces
- Size: About 220 troops
- Part of: Special Operations Division
- Garrison/HQ: Pfullendorf, Baden-Württemberg
- Mottos: The Eye of the Army; Oculus Exercitus
- Engagements: Aftermath of the Balkan Wars 1995–1999 (incl. operations to search and arrest war criminals); Kosovo War; Afghanistan War; Congolese Civil War

Commanders
- Current commander: Major Christian Simmelbauer

The FSLK200 (Fernspählehrkompanie 200) was the last activ and one of three now deactivated former Bundeswehr Fernspähkompanien special operations capable forces unit specialized special reconnaissance of the German Armed Forces (Bundeswehr). It has also been described as a deep reconnaissance company.

The *Fernspähtruppe* (long-range reconnaissance force) was a branch of the German Army. These long-range reconnaissance units were part of the operational and command support forces of the *Bundeswehr*. Their primary mission was to obtain key information deep behind enemy lines, carried out by small, self-reliant teams operating independently on foot over extended period of time and in all climate zones.

Fernspäher is an old term for elite reconnaissance troopers, relating to the word fern (long range, distance) and the word Späher (scout). Thus, the Fernspäher are specially trained and equipped reconnaissance soldiers who cover great distances to gather intelligence and fulfill military tasks of high importance.

In October 2011 the Federal Ministry of Defence (Bundesministerium der Verteidigung) announced that the FSLK200 would be deactivated, and their functions integrated into the reconnaissance units of the EGB Forces of the Rapid Forces Division, a process that was to be completed by the year 2014.

Since 2023, in addition to integrating long-range reconnaissance capabilities into other units, the Bundeswehr has once again established a dedicated long-range reconnaissance company (see History).

== Task ==
The FSLK200 was tasked with the gathering of critical intelligence deep behind enemy lines, whereby primarily, important strategic targets were to be recced, to enable or support a joint strike measure.

Hereby, the company was to adopt a supporting role for other Special Forces branches of the German Armed Forces. Soldiers in service with the FSLK200 were qualified, to conduct special operations stationary or mobile, at both night and in daytime, and to provide extended documentation and analysis of gathered intelligence through the means of optronic reconnaissance.

The syllable -lehr within Fernspäh-lehr-kompanie 200 designated yet another very special task of this company. It was the training, evaluation and demonstrations unit (Lehrtruppenteil) within the FSLK200. As such, it supervised and conducted special forces training for other specialised branches within the German Armed Forces. Secondly, in peace time, it was tasked with the field evaluation and demonstration of new tactics and equipment. The clearly offensive role of this unit, regained and attracted further interest again, only shortly after September 11, 2001 and during the emerging Global War on Terrorism (GWOT).

== History ==
Until the activation of the German Army's Kommando Spezialkräfte (Special Forces Command) in late 1996, the land arm of the Bundeswehr had three Fernspäher Companies (100, 200 and 300) with one being assigned to each Corps. The first unit of this kind was trained and commanded by Major Konrad Rittmeyer. Former German armies did not know the concept of long range reconnaissance. Rittmeyer studied the Finnish Army's World War II long-range patrol teams that conducted reconnaissance, sabotage, and prisoner capture missions as far as 300 km deep into Soviet territory, surviving for days on carried supplies or weeks on parachute dropped resupplies; furthermore he drew on the special skills of German Gebirgsjäger (mountain infantry), Fallschirmjäger (parachute infantry), and the special forces of Germany's NATO allies.

Rittmeyer's initial Fernspäh company, back in the day simply designated as Lehrgruppe R (Training Group R), quickly reflagged as Fernspählehrkompanie 200. His concept proved prolific enough to allow the creation of a Fernspäher school in Weingarten, South Germany. This institution would eventually reflag as the International Long Range Reconnaissance Patrol School (ILRRPS) and later move to Pfullendorf. From May 2001 it was called the International Special Training Center (ISTC). ILRRPS provided training for comparable units from Belgium, Denmark, Greece, Italy, Netherlands, Norway, Turkey, and the United States. Initially the British Special Air Service provided the Commanding Officer and some instructors for ILRRPS however they later withdrew from participation. When the Special Forces Command was activated in 1996, many of the ranks were filled with personnel from Fernspähkompanie 100 and Fernspähkompanie 300 which disbanded at last.

In June 2023, a long-range reconnaissance company (*Fernspähkompanie 1*) was re-established at the German Armed Forces (*Bundeswehr*) site in Schwarzenborn, Hesse. The three original long-range reconnaissance companies of the German Armed Forces—*Fernspähkompanie* 100, 200, and 300—had previously been disbanded, with their operational mandates transferred to other units.

*Fernspähkompanie 1*, based in Schwarzenborn, Hesse, is currently the only dedicated long-range reconnaissance company within the German Armed Forces.

Schwarzenborn in the Knüllgebirge mountains is located about 30 km from the Fritzlar Army Aviation Airfield. The now-disbanded Long-Range Reconnaissance Company 300 (Fernspähkompanie 300) was stationed at the Fritzlar Army Aviation Airfield.

== Chain of command ==
The FSLK200 had answered directly to the Special Operations Division (Division Spezielle Operationen) of the German Armed Forces and was later a part of the newly activated branch of army reconnaissance troops (Heeresaufklärungstruppe). Prior to the year 2007, the long range reconnaissance branch of service (Fernspähtruppe) was an independently acting formation within the German Armed Forces. Their crest and beret insignia displayed an eagle, as the most common symbol of all airborne qualified troops, with a set of lightning bolts in its claws, diving out of the sky, in front of a pair of crossed lances, which are the traditional insignia of German cavalry forces.

== Structure ==
The FSLK 200 consists of four SR platoons, an additional special applications SR platoon (covering the technical aspects of intelligence gathering as well as analysis of gathered data), a special applications maintenance group, a special applications support group, two specialized medical squads and a specialized military intelligence platoon. The overall-strength amounts to more than 220 troops.

- Fernspählehrkompanie 200
  - Kompanieführung (Company headquarters)
  - 1. Fernspähzug (1st SR platoon)
  - 2. Fernspähzug (2nd SR platoon)
  - 3. Fernspähzug (3rd SR platoon)
  - 4. Fernspähzug (4th SR platoon)
  - Fernspähspezialzug (Special applications SR platoon)
  - Feldnachrichtenzug (Military intelligence platoon)
  - Versorgungsgruppe Fernspäh (Special applications support group)
  - Instandsetzungsgruppe Fernspäh (Special applications maintenance group)
  - 2× Sanitätstrupp Fernspäh (Specialized medical squad)

In October 2011 the German ministry of defence announced that FSLK 200 will be deactivated and its elements integrated into the KSK by 2014.

== Missions ==
As with all branches of the German Armed Forces, FSLK200 had needed the approval of the German Bundestag, in order to officially participate in foreign deployments. This permission can however be obtained subsequently, if the situation would have required immediate action. Details concerning the former or present activity and operations of the FSLK200 are widely undisclosed. Today, it is known that members of the FSLK200 (Fernspäher) carried out missions in Bosnia and Herzegovina, during the Yugoslav Wars, and later during Operation Enduring Freedom in Afghanistan. Additionally, members of the FSLK200 (Fernspäher) were shipped to the Democratic Republic of the Congo in the year 2006, as being part of the EUFOR RD Congo deployment.

== Weaponry ==
The sophisticated arsenal of the FSLK200 was mainly based upon standard issue weaponry and small arms available to the German Armed Forces (Bundeswehr), yet with special additions that were not readily available to regular forces. The standard infantry weapons, with no exception for the FSLK200, were either the Heckler & Koch G36 (G36K/AG36) assault rifle, or the Heckler & Koch G3 battle rifle, followed by the Heckler & Koch MP5 submachine gun in several variants. Heavy weapons have included the Heckler & Koch HK21 (G8/G8A1) general purpose machine gun, the Rheinmetall MG3 general purpose machine gun, and the AWM (G22) and AW50 (G24) sniper rifles produced by Accuracy International. Sidearms have included the Heckler & Koch P12 and Heckler & Koch P8 universal self-loading pistols.
