= Multifunctional Reconnaissance Company =

U.S. Army reconnaissance unit

- Active: 2024–present
- Country: United States
- Branch: United States Army
- Type: Reconnaissance company
- Role: Reconnaissance, surveillance, and target acquisition; electronic warfare; counter-UAS; strike
- Size: Company (varies by MTOE)
- Part of: Mobile Brigade Combat Team
- Equipment: Infantry Squad Vehicle; small unmanned aircraft systems; loitering munitions; electronic-warfare sensors and jammers

The multifunctional reconnaissance company (MFRC; also multi-functional reconnaissance company) is a United States Army reconnaissance formation introduced during the Army's conversion of Infantry Brigade Combat Teams (IBCTs) to Mobile Brigade Combat Teams (MBCTs). One MFRC is assigned to each MBCT and gives the brigade commander a dedicated reconnaissance and targeting unit that combines infantry scouts, unmanned aircraft systems (UAS), electronic warfare (EW) assets, robotics and autonomous systems, and loitering munitions. The MFRC was a response to the inactivation of cavalry squadrons and their dismounted reconnaissance troops in Active Component IBCTs as they converted to the MBCT structure. The first MFRC was stood up in March 2024 by the 2nd Brigade Combat Team, 101st Airborne Division, serving as the Army's prototype MBCT for the Transformation in Contact (TiC) initiative. By late 2025, the Army had begun fielding MFRCs across both Active and National Guard brigades and planned to convert all 34 IBCTs into MBCTs as part of the 2025 Army Transformation Initiative.

== Background ==
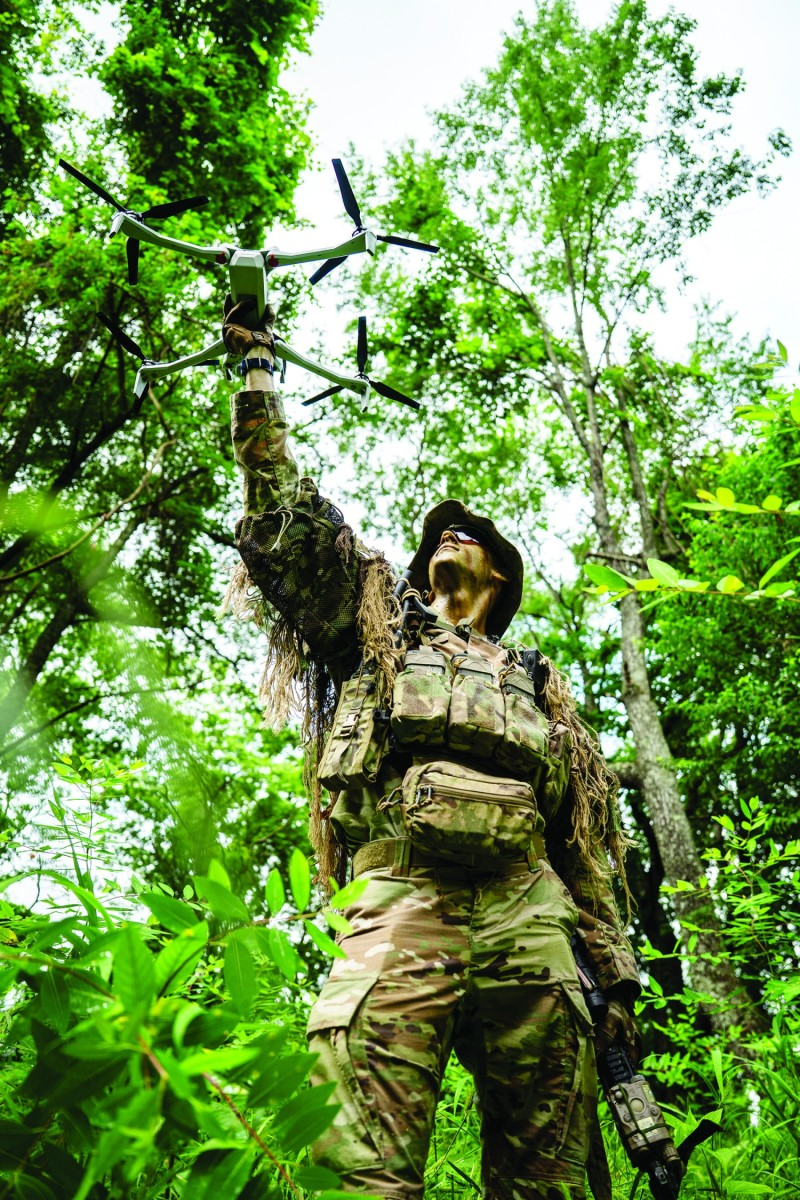
A Soldier in the Multi-Functional Reconnaissance Company, 2nd Battalion, 327th Infantry Regiment, 1st Mobile Brigade Combat Team “Bastogne” uses a Skydio drone during a training exercise at Fort Campbell, KY, on 16 June 2025.

=== Dismounted reconnaissance troop ===
The MFRC's predecessor in the IBCT was the dismounted reconnaissance troop (DRT), conventionally designated C Troop of the brigade's reconnaissance, surveillance, and target acquisition (RSTA) squadron. The DRT was the IBCT's close, deliberate, and stealthy reconnaissance element, suited to restricted or complex terrain where mounted scouts were less effective. A fully manned DRT fielded roughly 80 soldiers organized into a troop headquarters, a sniper squad, a mortar section, and two scout platoons of three sections each. Organic small UAS gave it limited extended-range observation, and the troop could insert by ground, water, or air; its shortage of organic vehicles, however, limited its mobility relative to the squadron's mounted troops.

As Active Component IBCTs converted to MBCTs, their cavalry squadrons and the DRTs within them were inactivated, removing the brigade's dedicated dismounted reconnaissance capability. The MFRC was created to fill that gap, in many cases drawing personnel directly from inactivated C Troops. DRTs remain in service in National Guard IBCTs that have not yet transitioned to the MBCT structure.

=== Transformation in Contact ===
Transformation in Contact is the Army's modernization model under which selected brigades receive new equipment and force structure during normal training cycles and feed lessons back into doctrine and acquisition, including the MFRC structure. The first iteration, TiC 1.0, ran in 2024 with three IBCTs: 2nd Brigade, 101st Airborne Division; 3rd Brigade, 10th Mountain Division; and 2nd Brigade, 25th Infantry Division. In 2025 the Army announced TiC 2.0, broadening the initiative to two armored brigade combat teams, two Stryker brigade combat teams, and National Guard formations, with about $1 billion in planned funding through fiscal year 2027. During 2nd Brigade, 101st Airborne Division's 2024 trials at Fort Campbell and the Joint Readiness Training Center (JRTC), the brigade's MFRC commander, Captain Charles O'Hagan, said it had been "tasked with being painfully light and disproportionately lethal to sense, kill, and protect on behalf of the brigade".

== Mission ==
The MFRC conducts reconnaissance and surveillance in the brigade deep area, reports enemy activity, detects and targets high-payoff targets, supports the brigade targeting process, and conducts counter-reconnaissance and security tasks. Its sensor reach extends well beyond that of the DRT, primarily through organic UAS, and is paired with launched effects and loitering munitions to shorten sensor-to-shooter timelines. Compared to the DRT, the MFRC places considerably greater emphasis on unmanned systems, electronic warfare, counter-unmanned aircraft systems (C-UAS), and kinetic effects organic to the company. The MFRC's emergence has prompted discussion within the reconnaissance community about whether comparable specialized formations should be revived at the division level, including a possible return of dedicated long-range surveillance capability.

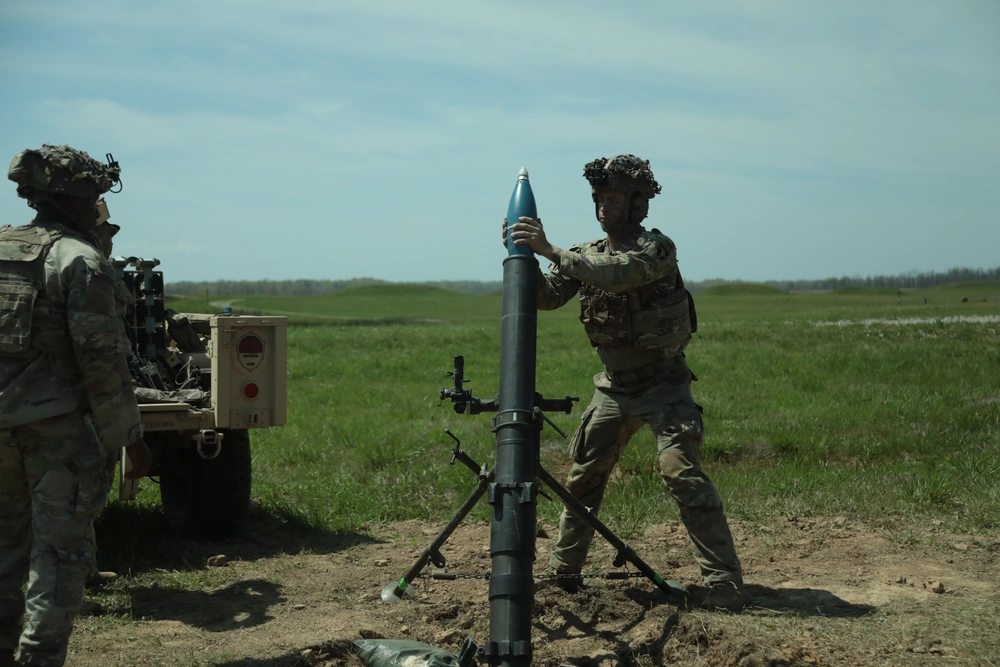
Soldiers from the Multi-Functional Reconnaissance Company, 2nd Brigade Combat Team, 101st Airborne Division (Air Assault) fire mortars.

== Organization ==
The Army's Congressional Research Service describes the MFRC as consisting of a tactical UAS platoon, an EW platoon, an effects platoon, and a reconnaissance platoon, with the UAS and EW platoons able to task-organize teams to subordinate battalions during distributed operations. Unlike a traditional cavalry troop or military intelligence company, the MFRC is a separate company under the brigade headquarters that reports directly to the brigade combat team commander, a relationship intended to let the brigade employ its effects without intervening layers of coordination. In practice, each brigade's MFRC has its own modified table of organization and equipment (MTOE), and the Army's Reconnaissance and Surveillance Leaders Course (RSLC) has observed that "every MFRC is different" despite a common core of infantry scouts, robotics and autonomous systems, and electromagnetic warfare assets. Most MFRCs use the Infantry Squad Vehicle (ISV) for ground maneuver, though units that have not received ISVs continue to use the HMMWV and other legacy systems.

The 2nd Brigade, 101st Airborne Division MFRC was initially built around three "hunter-killer" reconnaissance platoons, a drone-and-EW platoon, and a robotics and autonomous systems platoon. The unit later added a multi-domain effects platoon (MDEP). In this evolved structure the hunter-killer platoons find and fix the enemy using ground reconnaissance and small UAS, while the MDEP adds technical sensors and long-range precision effects and can itself find, fix, or finish targets through kinetic or non-kinetic fires. The company's effects platoon was initially equipped with direct-fire anti-armor TOW 2B missile systems, which the Army intends to replace with loitering munitions and a mobile long-range precision strike missile system to extend the platoon's reach for dispersed operations.

The 25th Infantry Division's MFRC includes a launched-effects platoon and is paired with a separate launched-effects company standing up in the divisional artillery. Division commander Major General James Bartholomees has framed the effort as a push to develop long-range sensing and strike capabilities, particularly for Indo-Pacific requirements.

== Capabilities and equipment ==
MFRCs field short- and medium-range UAS, loitering munitions, C-UAS systems, EW sensors and jammers, tactical command-and-control kit, and the ISV. Reported equipment includes commercial quadcopters for short-range reconnaissance, including Skydio drones used by the 1st Brigade's MFRC during 2025 training- Switchblade 600 loitering-munition control stations for long-range strike, Dronebuster handheld jammers and Bal Chatri drone detectors for C-UAS, and Tactical Assault Kit-enabled end-user devices for situational awareness. The Bal Chatri detector had previously been issued only to special-operations forces. Targeting workflows incorporate artificial intelligence assisted target recognition to pass cueing data to supporting field artillery; during the 2024 trials, MFRC soldiers used an AI application called "Shrike", developed by the Army Artificial Intelligence Integration Center and loaded onto unit drones via a small circuit board, to accelerate fire missions. EW soldiers in the MFRC can also generate electromagnetic decoys to spoof opposing-force sensors. During the 2nd Brigade, 101st Airborne Division's 2024 JRTC rotation, the MFRC used a combination of deception equipment and ISV mobility to mislead the opposing force as to the brigade's main effort.

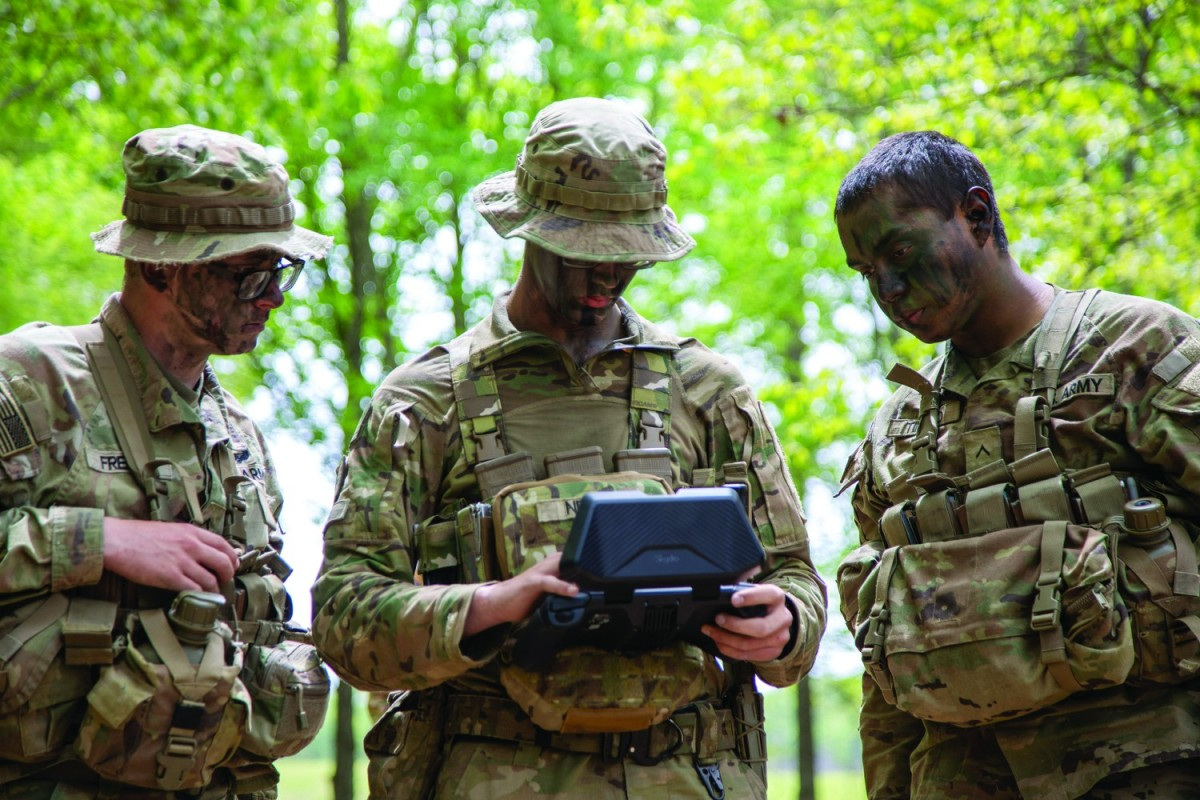
Soldiers assigned to Multi-Functional Reconnaissance Company, 2nd Brigade Combat Team, 101st Airborne Division, conduct area reconnaissance using an Unmanned Aerial Surveillance (UAS) drone during Operation Lethal Eagle 24.1.

== Employment ==
The MFRC fights as the brigade commander's primary deep-area reconnaissance and targeting asset, operating forward of the infantry battalions to answer priority intelligence requirements and to develop targets across multiple domains. Its internal organization supports a find–fix–finish chain: the hunter-killer platoons locate and fix the enemy, after which the multi-domain effects platoon either engages the target with its own kinetic or non-kinetic effects or passes it to another shooter.

=== Relationship with the multipurpose company ===
Within the MBCT, the MFRC and the battalions' multi-purpose companies (MPCs) form complementary layers of a single reconnaissance and strike architecture, distinguished primarily by echelon and reach. The MFRC operates in the brigade deep area under direct brigade control, while the MPCs conduct security and counter-reconnaissance for the infantry battalions in the close and shaping areas. When a target falls within a battalion's area of operations or exceeds the MFRC's organic effects, the sensing platoon can hand it off to the supported battalion, where the MPC engages it with mortars, anti-tank systems, or loitering munitions. Because the MFRC can also task-organize UAS and EW teams forward to subordinate battalions during distributed operations, those teams frequently integrate directly with the MPC once in sector, giving the battalion an additional sensing layer to cue its own fires.

== Operational history ==
=== 2nd Brigade, 101st Airborne Division ===
The Army's first MFRC, stood up in March 2024, belonged to 2nd Brigade, 101st Airborne Division. It first deployed during Operation Lethal Eagle 24.1 at Fort Campbell in April 2024, infiltrating ahead of the brigade, securing landing zones, conducting reconnaissance on multiple objectives, and observing an urban objective for several days before the brigade assault. The company then completed a JRTC rotation at Fort Johnson, Louisiana, in summer 2024. By mid-2025 the 1st Brigade, 101st Airborne Division ("Bastogne") had also fielded an MFRC, observed during training at Fort Campbell in June of that year.

=== 2nd Brigade, 25th Infantry Division ===
2nd Brigade, 25th Infantry Division, the Army's second TiC 1.0 prototype, took a parallel but distinct approach. Rather than an MFRC, the brigade tested a reconnaissance and strike company (RSC) during the Joint Pacific Multinational Readiness Center (JPMRC) 25-01 rotation in Hawaii in October 2024. The brigade returned to the Philippines in 2025 for JPMRC 25-02, continuing to test scouting, C-UAS, and EW concepts under TiC.

=== 1-2 Stryker Brigade Combat Team ===
In March 2025, 1st Battalion, 23rd Infantry Regiment of the 1-2 Stryker Brigade Combat Team employed a provisionally task-organized MFRC during a rotation to the Korea Combat Training Center (KCTC). The MFRC was assembled from elements of four battalions: a rifle company furnished the headquarters and mortar section, three scout platoons came from their organic battalions, and the brigade's engineer battalion provided the EW and UAS elements. It was the first MFRC fielded by a Stryker brigade, following adoption of the concept by the 101st Airborne, 25th Infantry, and 10th Mountain Divisions.

=== 116th Infantry Brigade Combat Team ===
The Virginia Army National Guard's 116th Infantry Brigade Combat Team was the first Army National Guard brigade to test the MBCT task organization, including an MFRC, during its 21-day eXportable Combat Training Capability (XCTC) rotation at Fort Pickett in June 2025.

== See also ==
- Brigade combat team
- Cavalry squadron
- Long-range surveillance company
- Recondo
- Reconnaissance and Surveillance Leaders Course
- 75th Ranger Regiment
- Team Awareness Kit
