= Battlefield surveillance brigades in the United States Army =

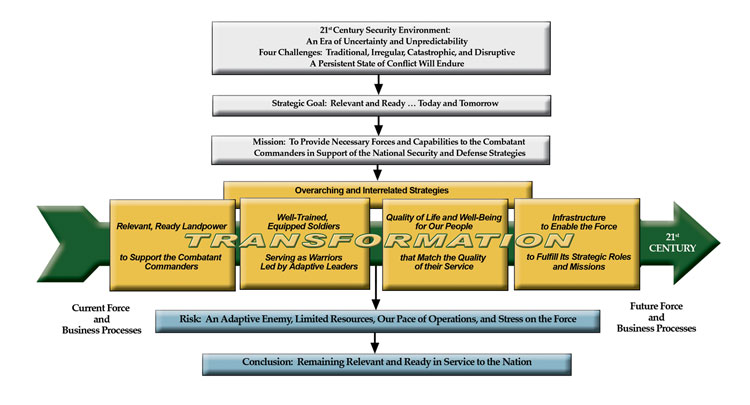
Army Modular Force

The battlefield surveillance brigade (BfSB) was a United States Army surveillance/reconnaissance formation introduced from 2006 to 2015. The United States Army planned for the creation and transformation of nine intelligence brigades to a 'battlefield surveillance' role in 2007. The first battlefield surveillance brigade was deployed the same year conducting Intelligence, Surveillance and Reconnaissance (ISR) operations.

However, gathering information is only a part of the challenge it faces. Along with the structural changes and intelligence capabilities, the sustainment capabilities of the brigade also changed. The United States Army is currently reorganizing these BfSB formations into expeditionary military intelligence brigades. These brigades were designed to be self-sufficient Army modular forces.

== Mission ==
The BfSBs were meant to improve situational awareness for commanders at division or higher so they can focus joint combat power in current operations while simultaneously preparing for future operations. The units had the tools to respond to the commanders needs from unmanned aerial vehicles to signals gathering equipment and human intelligence collectors. One of the major initiatives of the modernization plan involves migrating the army from a division-centric force designed to fight one or two potential major-theater wars toward a modular, brigade-centric force that is expeditionary in nature and deployed continuously in different parts of the world.

== Structure ==
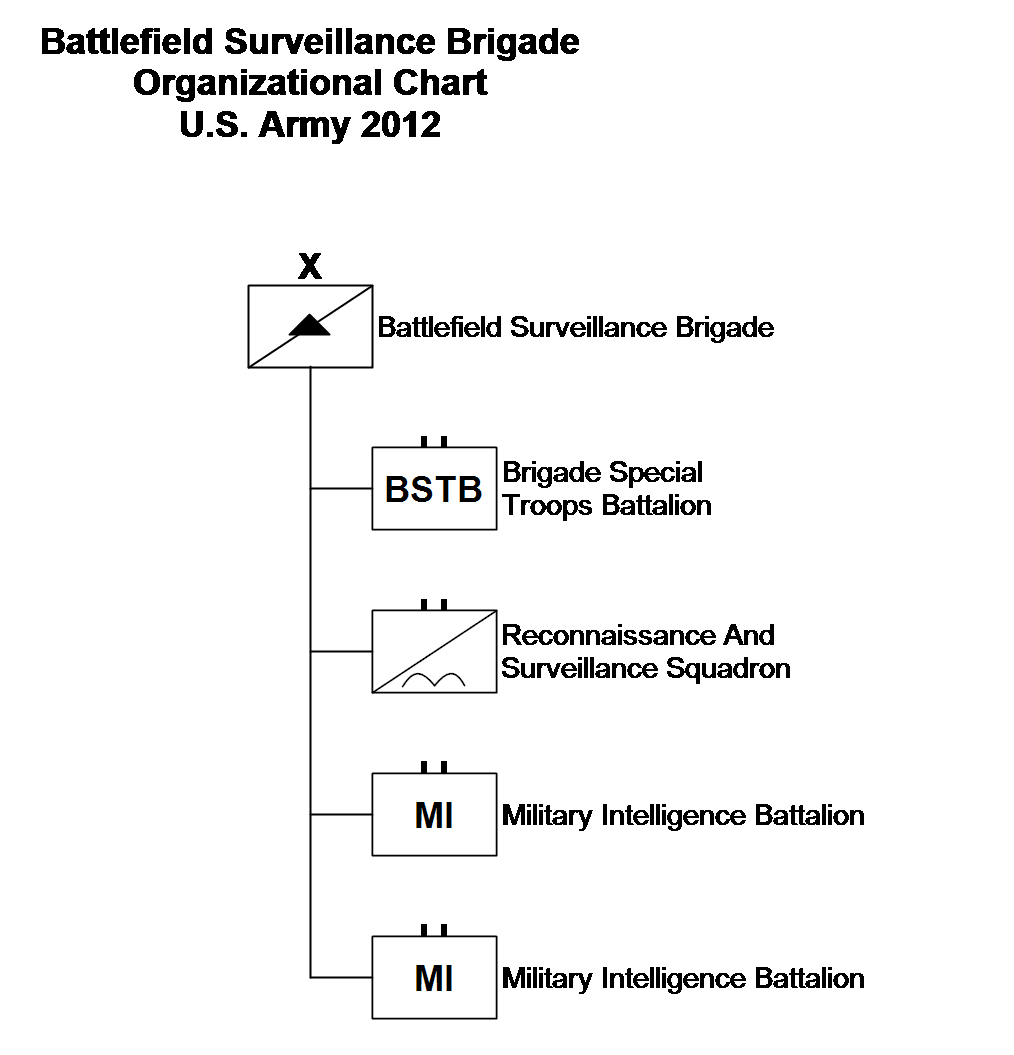
Battlefield surveillance brigade organizational table

Each BfSB consisted of a headquarters and headquarters company; active component units have two military intelligence battalions while the Army National Guard BfSBs had one; each brigade had a reconnaissance and surveillance squadron consisting of a headquarters troop; two ground troops (Troops A and B) and a long-range surveillance (LRS) company; a signal company (network support company, or NSC); and a brigade support company (BSC). In 2012, the active component brigades started grouping the brigade HHC, the signal company, and the support company under a special troops battalion.

== Transformation ==
Former units consisted of one Regular Army component and two reserve component detachments, there were both active-duty and National Guard surveillance brigades, each having a specific table of organization and equipment.

The changes made were all part of an Army-wide transition to the Army modular force, future-concept ("Grow The Army Plan" of modernization) proposed by US Army Chief of Staff General Peter Schoomaker in 2007. That plan called for ten Surveillance Brigades.

Former US Army Battlefield Surveillance Brigades

Unit	Patch	Component	Home Headquarters
58th Battlefield Surveillance Brigade		Maryland Army National Guard	Maryland
67th Battlefield Surveillance Brigade		Nebraska Army National Guard	Nebraska
71st Battlefield Surveillance Brigades		Texas Army National Guard	Texas
142nd Battlefield Surveillance Brigade		Alabama Army National Guard	Alabama
201st Battlefield Surveillance Brigade		Regular Army	Fort Lewis
219th Battlefield Surveillance Brigade		Indiana Army National Guard	Indiana
297th Battlefield Surveillance Brigade Became 297th Regional Support Group in 2016		Alaska Army National Guard	Alaska
504th Battlefield Surveillance Brigade		Regular Army	Fort Hood
525th Battlefield Surveillance Brigade		Regular Army	Fort Bragg
560th Battlefield Surveillance Brigade		Georgia Army National Guard	Georgia

By 2015, five Battlefield Surveillance Brigades were reorganized into expeditionary military intelligence brigades. The rest were converted to other types of units or inactivated.

== See also ==
- Reorganization plan of United States Army
