= United States Army Sniper School =

U.S. Army Sniper School
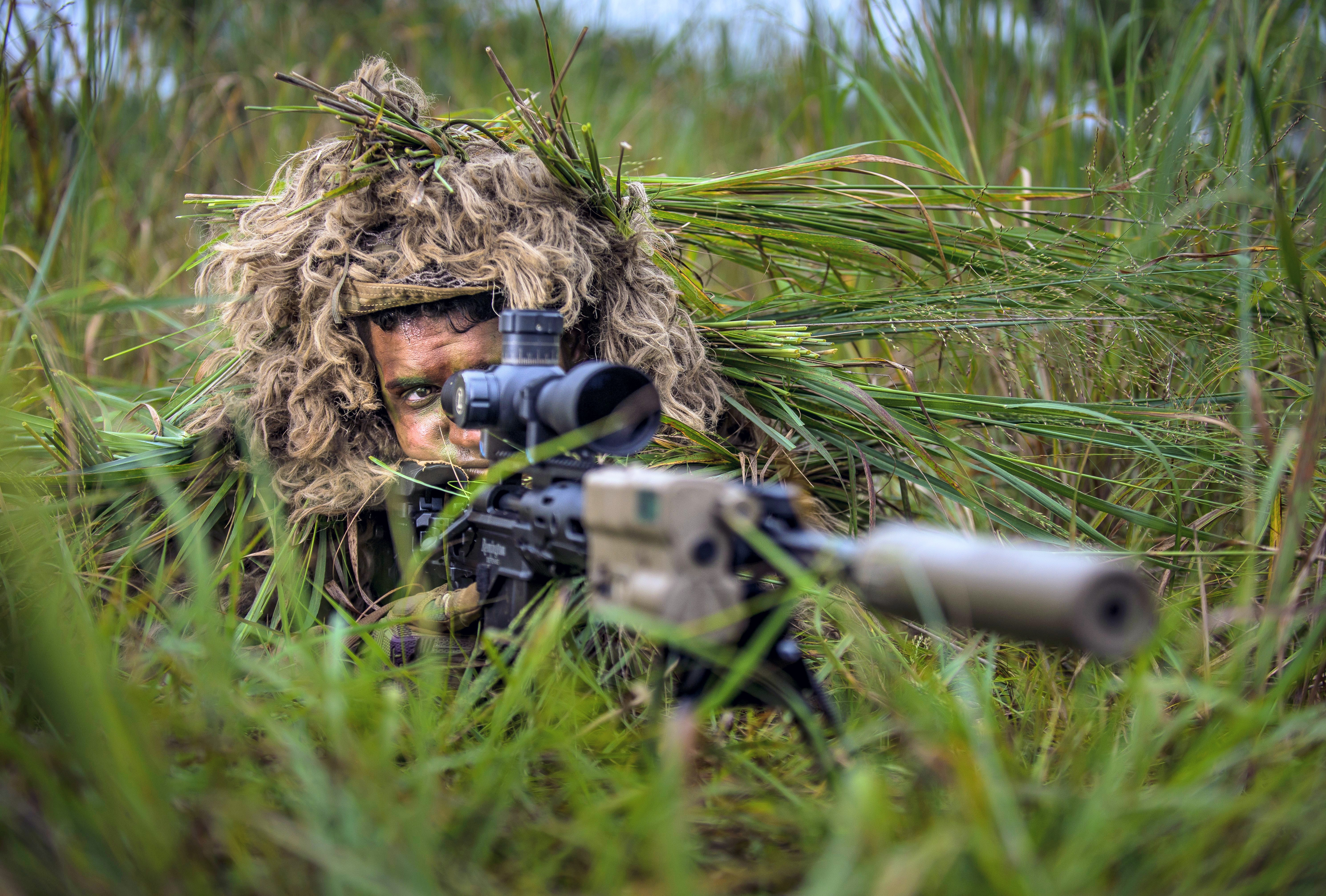
- Active: 1986—present
- Country: United States of America
- Branch: United States Army
- Type: Military training
- Role: Special skills training
- Part of: 199th Infantry Brigade, U.S. Army Infantry School
- Garrison/HQ: Fort Benning, Georgia
- Website: Official website

U.S. Army Sniper School (3:06)
Government video describing U.S. Army Sniper School

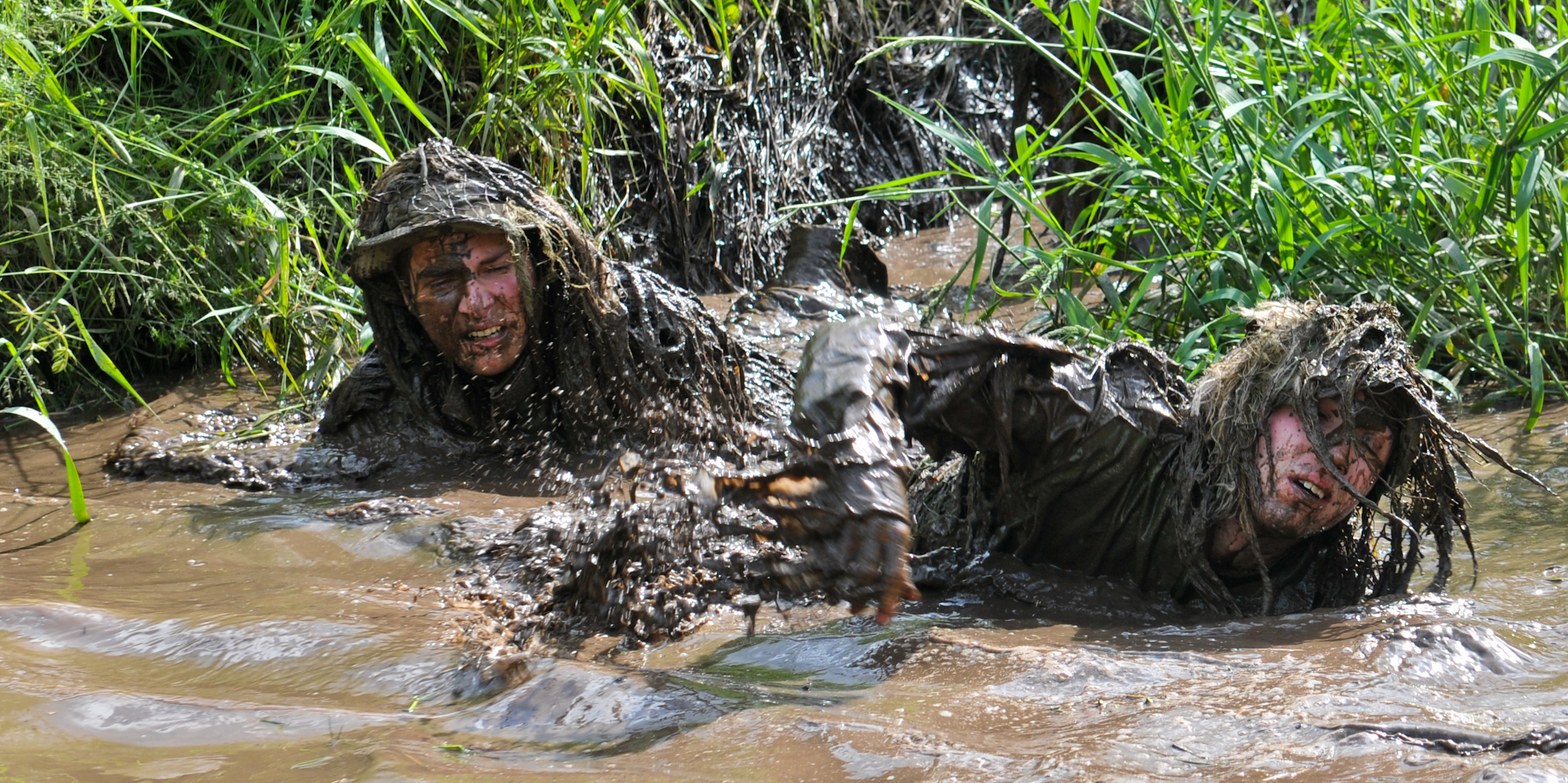
Sniper candidates add natural camouflage to their ghillie suits during one of the Sniper Course's MTT events in Baumholder, Germany (circa 2012)

The U.S. Army Sniper School trains selected military members assigned to sniper positions in the skills necessary to deliver long-range precision fire and the collection of battlefield information. Students will receive training in fieldcraft skills, advanced camouflage techniques, concealed movement, target detection, range estimation, terrain utilization, intelligence preparation of the battlefield (IPB), relevant reporting procedures, sniper tactics, advanced marksmanship, and staff subjects (intelligence, mission, training, combat orders, command and control, and training management).

== History ==
Although the US Army set up an advanced marksmanship course at Camp Perry, Ohio, the Army had no official sniper course during World War II.

During the Korean War, Snipers were used during the first recapture of Inchon, Seoul, and the Battle of Chosin. When the war went into its static period in 1951 the Army and Marines as in World War I and WW II were deadly, especially during this static defense period of the war. .50 caliber weapons with scopes were also used for sniping purposes by the U.S. The favorite was a M2 .50 caliber machine gun with a target scope attached; due to the weight, this system was not mobile. Major advances were implemented in sniper tactical mission planning, information gathering, harassing and delaying the enemy. The top sniper of Korea was Sgt Boindot from the U.S. Army with 70 confirmed kills. After the Korean War, the U.S. sniper program was again discontinued.

During 1955–1956, the Army Marksmanship Training Unit operated the first US Army Sniper School at Camp Perry, Ohio. A lack of understanding and appreciation for the effectiveness and potential that snipers could add to the fight, caused sniper training to be abandoned after this short training period.

In Vietnam, by July 1968, the US Army began centralized training in-country. The 9th Infantry Division established one of the first in-country Sniper Schools. The course, run by Major Willis Powell, lasted 18 days with the failure rate being 50%. In December 1968, a full complement of seventy-two snipers were ready for action.

The US Army Sniper School was established in 1987, at the Infantry Center at Fort Benning, GA, and continues to produce top-notch snipers today. Its continuous existence reflects the longest sniper training course in the history of the US Army and is a testament to the high priority sniper training now enjoys among the Army's leadership. Following the terrorist attacks on the World Trade Center buildings, the U.S. military entered into combat operations in Afghanistan under Operation Enduring Freedom. Snipers proved themselves as an invaluable asset due to their ability to engage targets at great distances in a mountainous battlefield.

The first woman graduated from the school in 2021.

== Purpose ==
The term "Scout Sniper" is only used officially by the Marine Corps, but it does not imply a differing mission from the U.S. Army Sniper. An Army Sniper's primary mission is to support combat operations by delivering precise long-range fire on selected targets. By this, the sniper creates casualties among enemy troops, slows enemy movement, frightens enemy soldiers, lowers morale, and adds confusion to their operations. The sniper's secondary mission is collecting and reporting battlefield information, Section 1.1 FM 23-10 Sniper Training.

The Marine Corps consolidates the reconnaissance and sniper duties into a single Marine, while many other conventional armed forces, including the U.S. Army, more frequently separate the reconnaissance scout position or billet from that of the sniper. In the U.S. Army, the 19D military occupation code, "Cavalry Scout" is the primary special reconnaissance and surveillance soldier and the term "Infantry Scout" refers to a specially trained infantrymen that functions in a reconnaissance and surveillance capacity, while "Sniper" refers to a specially selected and trained soldier that primarily functions as a sniper. However, both cavalry scouts and infantry scouts can attend the Army's sniper school, gain the sniper skill qualifier, and serve simultaneously as scouts and snipers.

More than 300 soldiers each year begin the seven-week U.S. Army Sniper School at Fort Benning, Georgia. Army snipers face demanding missions and often operate with little or no support, and the training at Fort Benning tests their ability to work in isolation and under pressure.

The Army Sniper Course trains selected individuals in the skills necessary to deliver long range precision fire and the collection of battlefield information. During the 7 week course, Soldiers will receive training in the application of fieldcraft; advanced camouflage techniques, concealed movement, target detection, range estimation, and terrain utilization (Macro and Micro), intelligence preparation of the battlefield (IPB), relevant reporting procedures, sniper tactics, advanced marksmanship; known and unknown distance firing, at stationary and moving targets during daylight and limited visibility in varying weather conditions, and staff subjects (intelligence, mission, training, combat orders, command and control, and training management) to ensure mission accomplishment without compromise in accordance with the supported unit commander's intent in all operational venues.

The US Army's Maneuver Center of Excellence has released an updated Training Circular 3-22.10, Sniper, dated December 2017. The sniper training circular has been completely revised and updated in various topics to include; sniper planning, employment, field craft, marksmanship, ballistic programs, and complex engagements. The intent of this training circular was to create uniformity within the sniper community, and to align sniper training and employment with current U.S. Army doctrine.

In 2018, the United States Army Sniper Course changed their course Program of Instruction (POI) to focus on how the sniper can be utilized in large scale, ground combat warfare. After a course revision, the cadre and leadership concluded that Army snipers need to focus on acting as sensors, communicators and human weapons systems, supporting enhanced multi-domain command and control from the ground in anti-access/area denial environments.

== Notable Army Snipers ==
- U.S. Army Staff Sergeant Jim Gilliland previously held the record for the longest recorded confirmed kill with a 7.62×51mm NATO rifle at 1,250 m (1,367 yd) with a M24, while engaging an Iraqi insurgent sniper in Ramadi, Iraq on 27 September 2005.
- U.S. Army Staff Sergeant Timothy L. Kellner was regarded as one of the top snipers in U.S. Army history, with 139 confirmed kills during the Iraq War.
- Adelbert F. Waldron III achieved 109 confirmed kills during the Vietnam War.
- Master Sgt. Gary Gordon and Sgt. First Class Randy Shughart were Delta Force snipers who were awarded the Medal of Honor for their fatal attempt to protect the injured crew of a downed helicopter during the Battle of Mogadishu. This action was later dramatized in the film Black Hawk Down.

== Other schools ==
After graduating the basic course, US Army Snipers are given the opportunity to obtain a variety of other courses to further refine their skills.

- Urban Snipers
- High Angle (Mountain) Snipers
- Snipers Team leader course (U.S. Marine Corps)
- Foreign Forces Snipers Schools
  - British Royal Marine Snipers School
  - Israeli Foreign Forces Snipers School

== See also ==
- United States Marine Corps Scout Sniper
- Sniper
- Designated marksman
- Intelligence, surveillance, target acquisition, and reconnaissance
- Sniper rifle
