= École Normale Primaire =

French school for training primary-school teachers

A normal school was responsible for training primary school teachers in France. This system, which had long been an essential part of the structure of state primary education, lasted in France from 1808 to 1990–1991. They were commonly called école normale d'instituteurs or école normale d'institutrices. Later, they were integrated into the IUFM, which trains primary and secondary school teachers.

For a time, Japan followed the French model with the creation of normal schools in 1886.

== Normal schools in France ==
During the First Empire (1804–1814), article 108 of the Imperial Decree of March 17, 1808, concerning the organization of the University of France, provided for the creation of "normal classes" within the lycées or collèges "intended to train teachers for the primary schools". After the short-lived first normal school in Paris in 1794, the second "normal school" was created in Strasbourg in 1810, mainly thanks to the prefect Adrien de Lezay-Marnésia. Initially, this normal school for boys was only an annex of the lycée for boys of Strasbourg, before being granted autonomy in 1820.

=== Before 1879 ===
Until 1879, the normal schools for boys and girls provided mainly moral and religious education. During the Restoration (1814–1830) and then the July Monarchy (1830–1848), the number of normal schools for boys reached 13 in 1829, 47 in 1832, and 56 on June 28, 1833, according to the table drawn up by the Minister François Guizot on July 24, 1833, in his circular letter to the prefects. This table lists 35 "boarding schools" and 21 "day schools" for these 56 normal schools in operation, 15 normal schools in project, and 18 departments without projects out of a total of 86 departments.

==== The Guizot Law (1833) ====
On January 2, 1833, François Guizot, Minister of Public Instruction, presented his bill on primary education to the Chamber of Deputies. In his introductory speech, he stated:

"[...] Henceforth, any citizen over 18 years of age may found, maintain, and direct any primary school establishment, whether of a lower or higher level, normal or otherwise, in any urban or rural commune, without any conditions other than a certificate of good conduct and a certificate of proficiency obtained after an examination. [...] We do not fear freedom of education; on the contrary, we encourage it".

But then, lamenting that thousands of rural communes still lack primary schools and that, in the others, a large proportion of children do not attend school, the Minister continued:

"[...] Hence the necessity for the establishment of public schools, that is to say, schools maintained in whole or in part by the communes, the departments, or the State, for the regular education of the people".

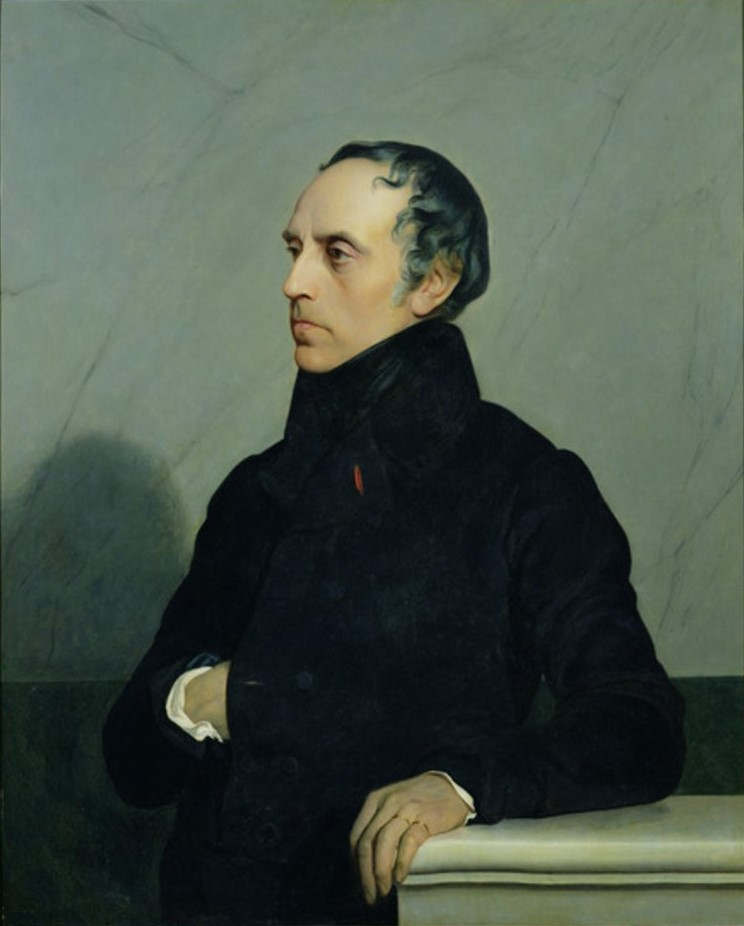
François Guizot - Minister of Public Instruction from 1832 to 1837.

After defining what it means to be a good teacher and lamenting the fact that they often are not, the Minister continued:

"[...] But we must try to train good teachers, and for that, gentlemen, normal schools are indispensable [...] We, therefore, propose the establishment of one normal school per department".

François Guizot wanted to oblige each department to create a normal school to train the competent teachers that France needed. This bill, after being quickly debated and amended, was approved by the two chambers of Parliament.

The GuizotLaw on primary education was promulgated by Louis-Philippe I, King of France, on June 28, 1833. Contrary to François Guizot's wishes, the new law did not apply to girls, whose education continued to be governed by the previous, more restrictive regulations. Some of the articles of the new law concerned normal schools and teachers since the law required each département to have a normal school for boys:

- Article 11: "It shall be the duty of each department to maintain a normal school, either by itself or by association with one or more neighboring departments".
- "The general councils shall deliberate on the means of ensuring the maintenance of normal schools. They shall also deliberate on the advisability of several departments uniting to maintain a normal school. This union shall be authorized by royal order".
- Article 12: "Every teacher of a local normal school shall have 1) a suitably equipped room, both for his living and for the accommodation of his students; 2) a fixed salary, which shall not be less than 200 francs for an primary normal school and 400 francs for a superior normal school".
- Article 25: "In each department, there shall be one or more normal education committees responsible for examining all applicants for certificates of aptitude, both for primary normal education and superior normal education and which shall issue such certificates under the authority of the Minister. These committees shall also be responsible for conducting admission and graduation examinations for normal school students [...]".

On July 24, 1833, the Minister sent a long circular letter to Prefects on this law of 25 articles concerning primary education for boys only. In it, the Minister explained how the law was to be applied, particularly concerning normal schools:

- The expenses "must be paid either from the students' pensions or the proceeds of scholarships established by the State, the department or the communes".
- "[...] The General Council will therefore have to set the pension rate for each student and create a certain number of scholarships or parts of them for candidates who do not have the means to pay either all or part of their pension. [...] For my part (says the Minister), I intend to use part of the credit at my disposal [...] either to contribute to the fixed expenses or to create scholarships in each normal school. I urge you to invite the municipal councils of wealthy towns to set up similar scholarships, and those of rural communes to pay all or part of the board of the student they wish to have as a teacher. It is to be hoped that charitable individuals and associations will also set up scholarships in these establishments".

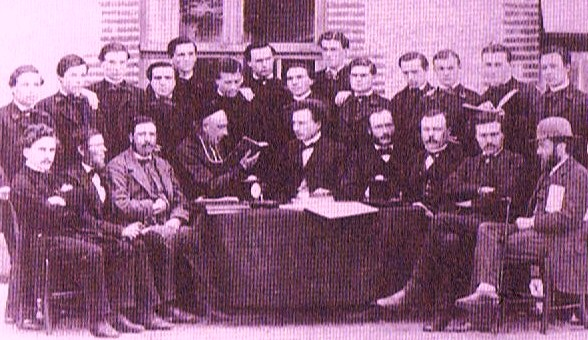
1865: A boys' normal school with its chaplain and other teachers seated. Standing, aspiring teachers in uniform.

This means that aspiring teachers had to finance all or part of their short studies at a normal school themselves unless they were eligible for all or part of a municipal, departmental, or state scholarship. At the end of these short studies, they must obtain a "certificate of proficiency" to be entitled to teach.

The regulations of 1833 established the certificate of proficiency required to teach in both private and public schools. There were to be two such certificates: a "primary" certificate (BE in French), followed by a " superior " certificate (BS in French). As a result, anyone over the age of 18 who wished to work as a primary school teacher or head a primary school would have to have not only a certificate of good character but also a certificate of proficiency (BE or BS), depending on the level of the school, obtained after an examination organized in each department by designated committees.

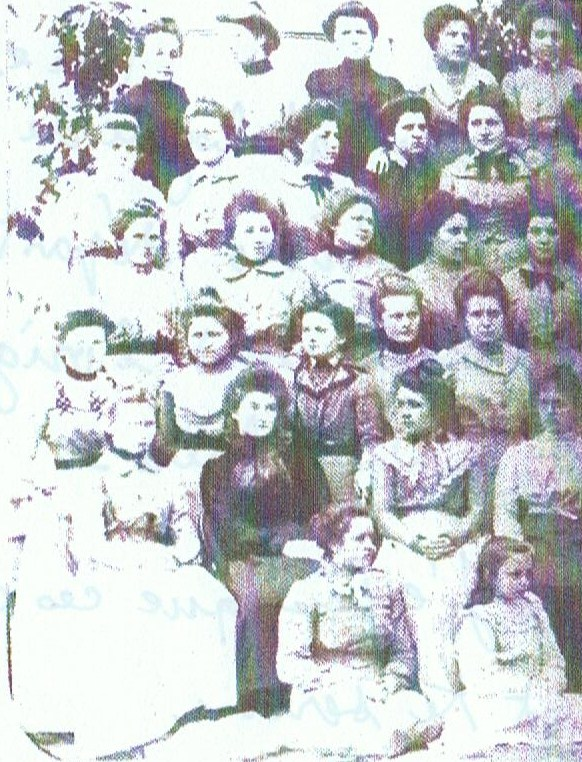
Aspiring female teachers from the Vaucluse and Basses Alpes regions gathered at the Normal School in Digne (Basses-Alpes, France), 1901–1902.

==== First normal school for girls (1838) ====
On June 2, 1833, David Lévi Alvarès, in partnership with M. Lourmand, opened a regular course for aspiring female teachers at the Hôtel de Ville, Paris. Every Sunday, five hundred of these aspiring female teachers attended this gathering in the Salle Saint-Jean.

Five years later, in 1838, France's first normal school for girls was founded. This was facilitated by the royal order of June 23, 1836, which extended some of the articles of the law of June 28, 1833, except for articles 11 and 12 concerning the creation of a normal school (for girls) in each department. However, ten years later, in 1848, there were already eight normal schools for girls, as well as some thirty « cours normaux » ("normal courses"), which provided a small amount of training for girls who wanted to become public school teachers, at a lower cost to the departments. In 1863, for the 85 French departments, there were only 11 normal schools for girls and 53 normal courses for them.

During the Second Republic (1848–1852) and the Second Empire (1852–1870), normal schools were viewed with suspicion by the authorities, who suspected them of promoting democratic or even socialist ideas. As early as June 18, 1849, Alfred de Falloux, Minister of Public Instruction, presented his bill in favor of freedom of education to the Constitutional Assembly:

- " [...] Seeing successive governments lay their hands on public education, it seems that they have all prided themselves on improvising a society in their image. Freedom of education, finally established in our Constitution, must put an end to these illusions and these attempts. [...] The family, just as the individual, must not rebel against the State, the State cannot and must not arbitrarily take the place of the family".
- " [...] What is the moral value of a normal school? Not all primary teachers are educated in normal schools. However, out of about 1700 vacancies each year, these schools provide no less than 750 to 800 individuals, and these individuals, who should serve as models, are currently the focus of the harshest criticism. Serious, impartial, political voices have been raised calling for the absolute abolition of normal schools. [...]The school itself has been attacked as fundamentally vicious".
- " [...]These are grave objections. However, we believed that the project could be continued with the counterweight of a rigorous training program and that, in any case, this program should produce its recruits before dispensing with the resources of the normal school. Above all, we sought to leave it to the General Councils to judge the needs or perils of each department; we raised their vigilance and reinforced their severity".
- "[...] It may come as a surprise that not a single article in the draft concerns the teaching of girls [...] Instruction has remained too isolated from education, and education too isolated from religion. [...] This is the goal we have tried to achieve... by entrusting the moral supervision of primary school to the parish priest or pastor".

During the debates in the Assembly, Victor Hugo (now a Republican) declared himself firmly opposed to the bill, which he considered too clerical and reactionary. Although it was debated and amended, Alfred Falloux's bill was nevertheless passed. And so, on March 15, 1850, Louis-Napoléon Bonaparte, President of the Republic, promulgated the Falloux law concerning primary education. Article 35 of this law concerns only normal schools for boys, whose existence is called into question by its first and second paragraphs:

- Article 35 - "Each department is obliged to provide for the recruitment of communal teachers, either by maintaining the aspiring teachers in primary schools designated by the Academic Council, or in the normal school established (for this purpose) by the department itself".
- The General Council of the department or the Minister in the Superior Council (on the report of the Academic Council) may abolish the normal schools, with the exception, in both cases, of the rights conferred on those receiving scholarships.

Article 35 of the Falloux law (March 15, 1850) obliged the départements to ensure the recruitment of aspiring teachers but left them free to choose between the normal school or the simple primary schools reserved for this purpose. It also explicitly stated that the normal schools for boys could be abolished by the General Council or even by the Minister of Public Instruction. As a result, the number of normal schools would not increase, it would even decrease, even though religious instruction would be given in these schools by a resident chaplain with considerable authority.

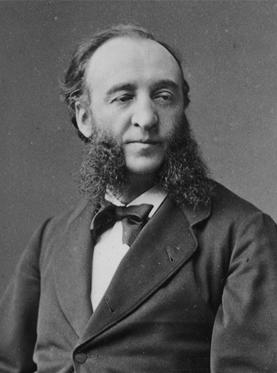
Jules Ferry

=== Generalization of normal schools (from 1879 onwards) ===
==== Jules Ferry Laws (1879) ====
Under the Third Republic (1870–1940), the Republican victory in the senatorial elections of 1879 led to Jules Ferry's appointment to the Ministry of Public Instruction and Fine Arts, then to the presidency of the council. Between 1879 and 1882, a series of school laws were passed establishing compulsory, free, and secular primary education for all boys and girls in France between the ages of 6 and 13 (rising to 14 in 1936). Those who obtained the CEP (certificat d'études primaires) at the age of 11 were released from their schooling obligations.

On 14 January 1878, deputy Paul Bert presented a bill to the French Chamber of Deputies on the creation of normal schools. In his introductory speech, Paul Bert said:

- "Gentlemen, Article 11 of the law of June 28, 1833 orders that "each department shall be required to maintain a normal school, either by itself or by joining with one or more neighboring departments". But this requirement only applies to normal schools for boys, and the Royal Order of June 23, 1836 (which extends most of the articles of the 1833 law to the teaching of girls), makes no mention of normal schools for girls".
- "As a result, while there are now 79 normal schools for boys, most of them long-established, there are only 17 normal schools for girls, 9 of which have only been created since the war" (of 1870-71 - editor's note).
- "There is no serious reason to justify this inequality. The times are no longer when everything to do with the education of girls seemed to be systematically neglected; public opinion has come to understand that it is just as important as that of boys. In the words of Jules Simon: "Quand on instruit une femme, on crée pas seulement une femme instruite, mais une institutrice" (When you educate a female, you create not just an educated female, but a female teacher). This summarize everything that has been so aptly developed on this subject".
- "I have therefore come to ask you to apply all the regulations of the 1833 law to normal schools for girls. It should be noted, however, that the law of 15 March 1850 (which had originally proposed "the destruction of normal schools"), made it optional, under article 41, to keep the schools that had already been founded; it should be added that only two of these schools (Lot and Lot-et-Garonne) disappeared under the new legislation".
- "I think it would be useful to repeat the imperative formula of the 1833 law. [...] ".

After lengthy discussions and amendments, Paul Bert's bill was finally passed by the Chamber of Deputies and the Senate the following year.

The Paul Bert Law was promulgated by the President of the Republic, Jules Grévy, on August 9, 1879. This seven-article law once again required the departments to have a normal school for boys and, for the first time, a normal school for girls.

- Article 1: "Each department shall be provided with a normal school for boys and a normal school for girls sufficient to ensure the recruitment of its communal aspiring teachers, both boys and girls. These establishments must be set up within four years of the promulgation of this law. With the approval of the Superior Council of Public Education, a decree by the President of the Republic may authorize two departments to join together to create and maintain one or both of their normal schools. [...] "
- Article 2: "The initial establishment and the annual maintenance of normal schools are compulsory expenses incurred by the departments".

==== Law of Separation of Church and State (1905) ====
The new regulations redefined normal schools: religious instruction was abolished and replaced by a republican moral and civic education, legitimizing the nickname of "black hussars" given to primary school teachers after the 1905 vote on the Law of Separation of Church and State.

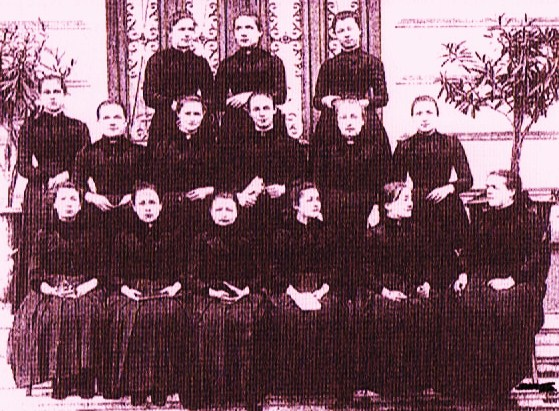
Class of 1888–1891, Normal School for Girls, Valence (Drôme).

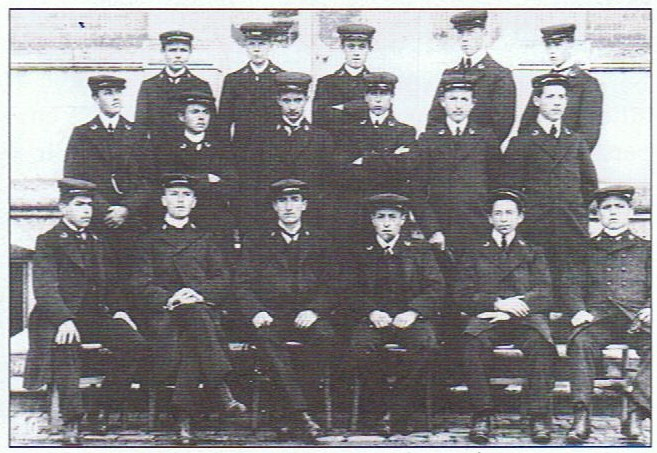
Class of 1908-1911 from the Normal School of Orléans in black uniform (see "Black Hussars").

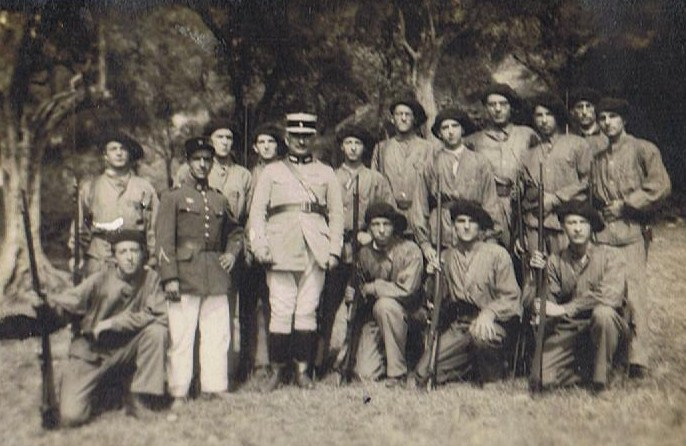
Class of 1926-1929 from the Normal School of Nice (A.-Mmes) during military training.

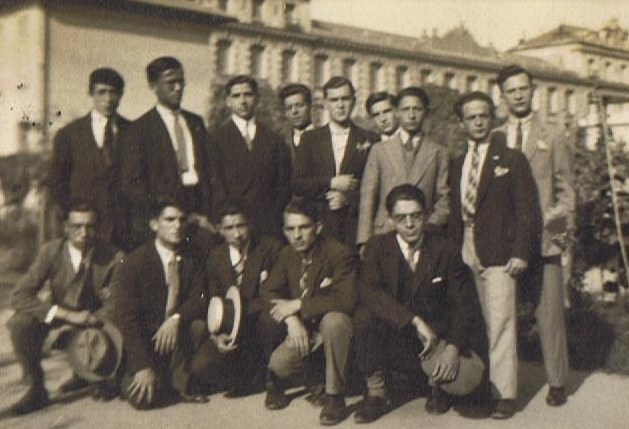
Class of 1926–1929 in front of their normal school in Pierre-Sola, Nice (Alpes-Maritimes).

In reality, only a fraction of future primary school teachers are recruited by entrance examination. Candidates were required to have the CEP or, later, the "primary" certificate (BE). The vast majority of these candidates came from the "popular" curriculum, that is, classes in complementary courses or EPS (écoles primaires supérieures). The others came from collèges and lycées classes of the so-called "bourgeois" curriculum. Until 1940, those admitted to the entrance examination were required to undergo three years of education, at the end of which they had to pass the «Brevet de capacité pour l'enseignement primaire» ("Primary school teaching certificate" in English) corresponding to the Brevet supérieur (Certificate of higher education for primary teaching in English) and giving them the right to be appointed as probationary teachers to obtain their CAP (Certificat d'aptitude pédagogique) and thus their tenure. This meant that the majority of "primary" teachers, recruited outside the normal school system and therefore without any initial professional training, had to have at least the primary certificate. They then had the precarious status of remplaçants (auxiliary teachers who could be dismissed at any time) and had to teach for several years before they could finally obtain their CAP and thus tenure. Until 1924, the superior certificate (BS) - the "keystone" diploma of the "popular" primary curriculum - was also the final diploma of the "bourgeois" secondary curriculum for girls. Until that year, the baccalauréat was limited to boys' public and private lycées and collèges. The exception was girls who took the baccalauréat as free candidates, and only those who passed were admitted to university.

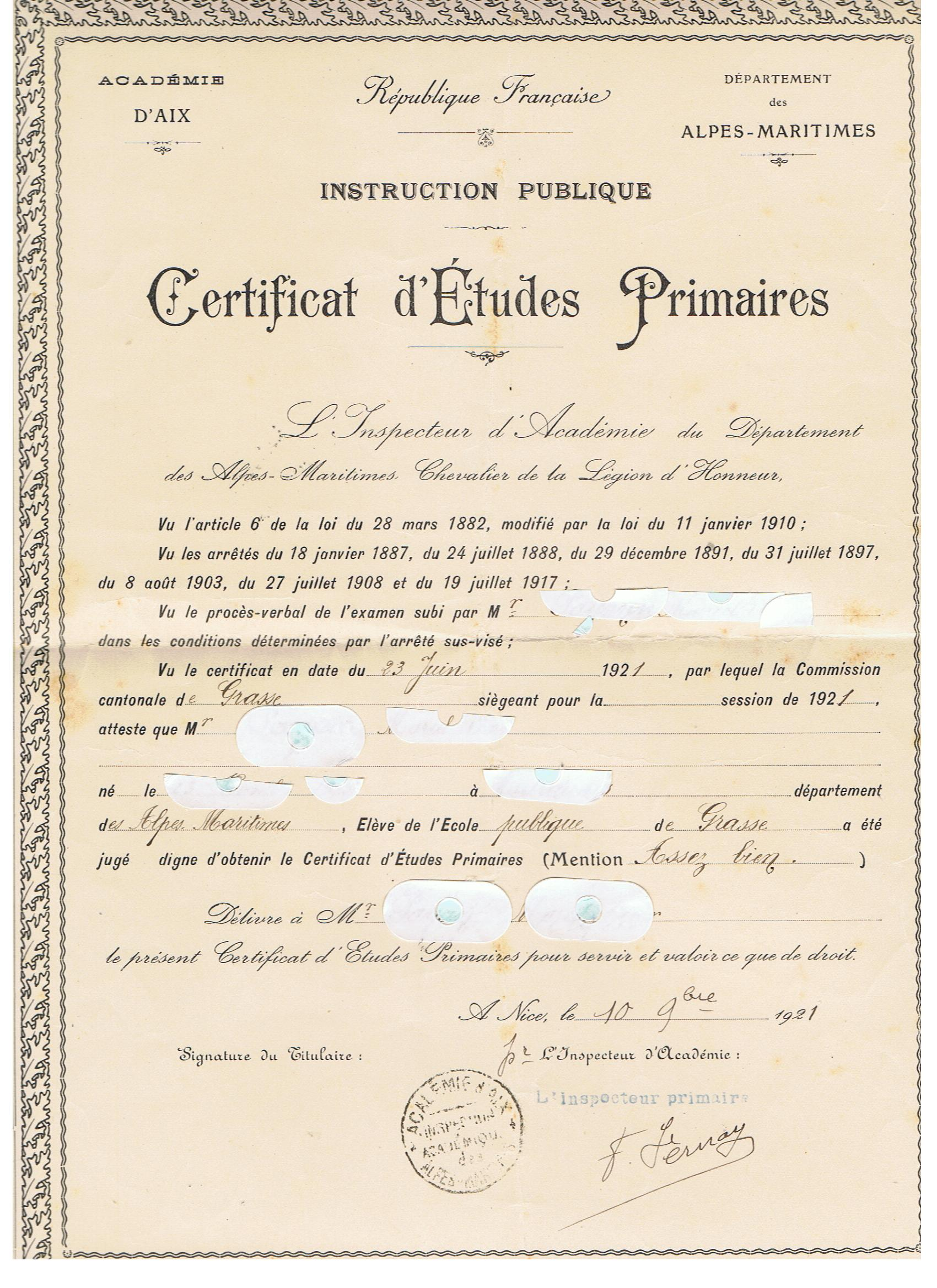
Certificate of primary studies (CEP) obtained from the age of 11 for the most deserving.

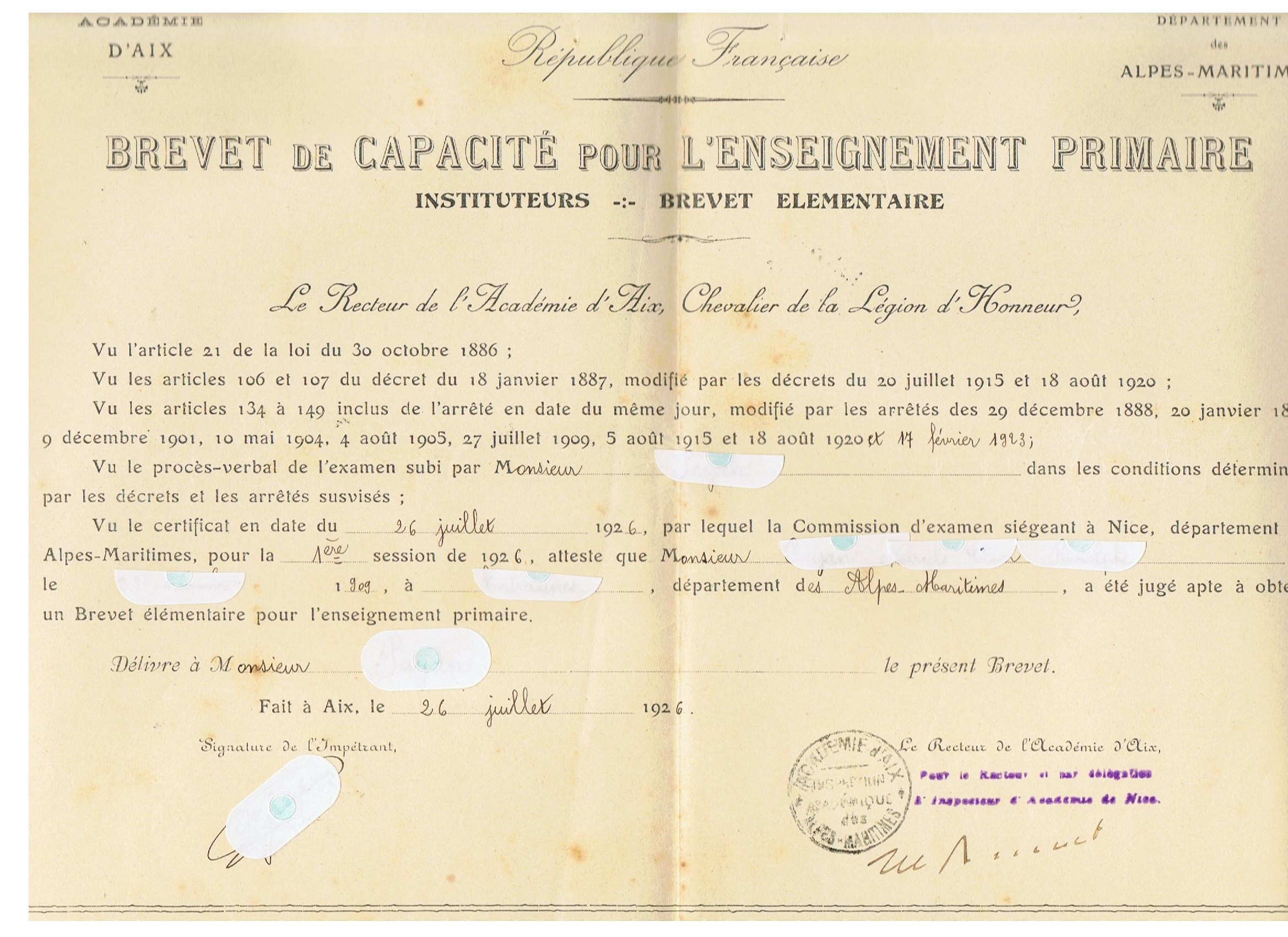
Primary school teaching certificate (BE).

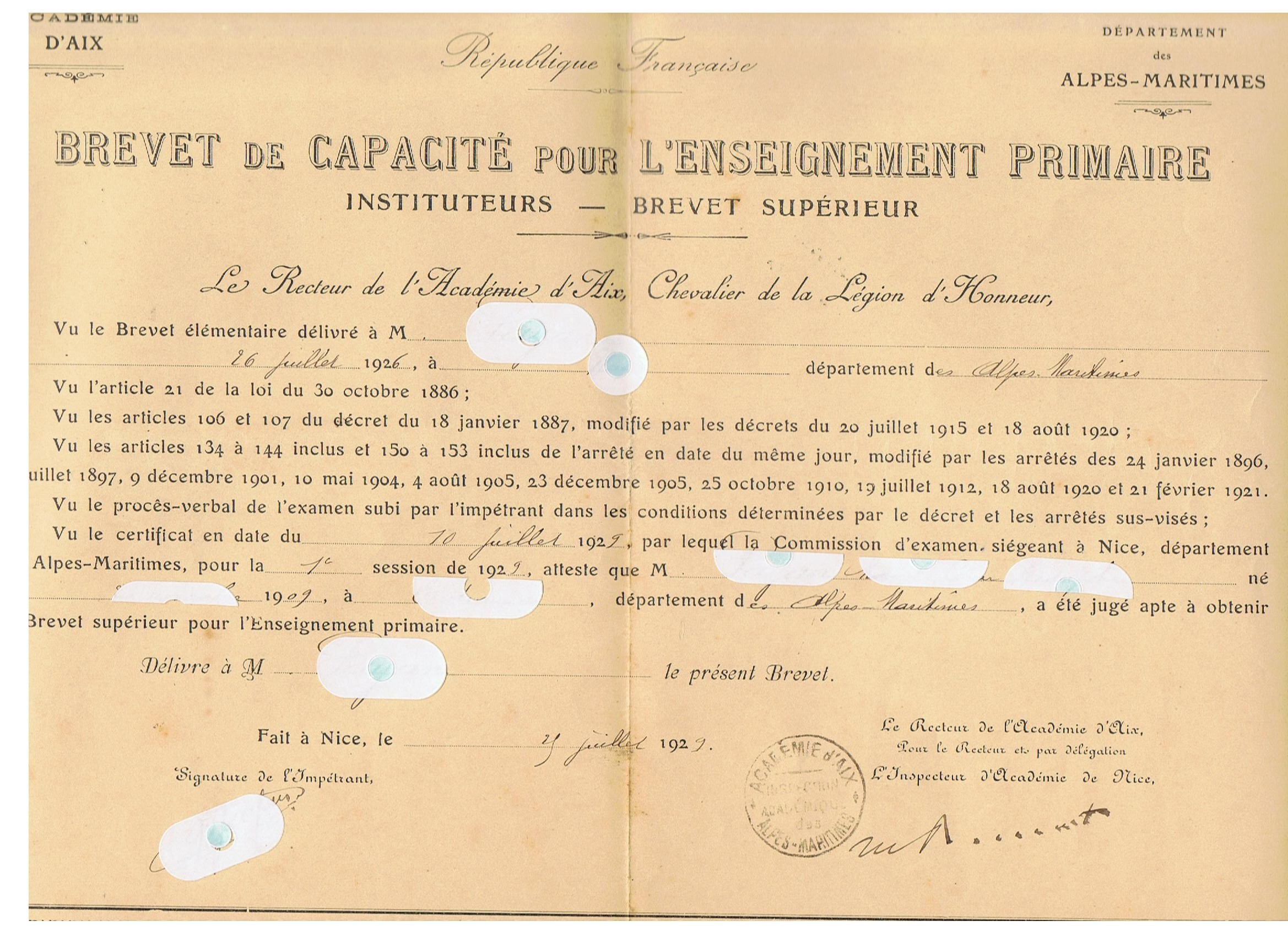
Certificate of higher education for primary teaching.

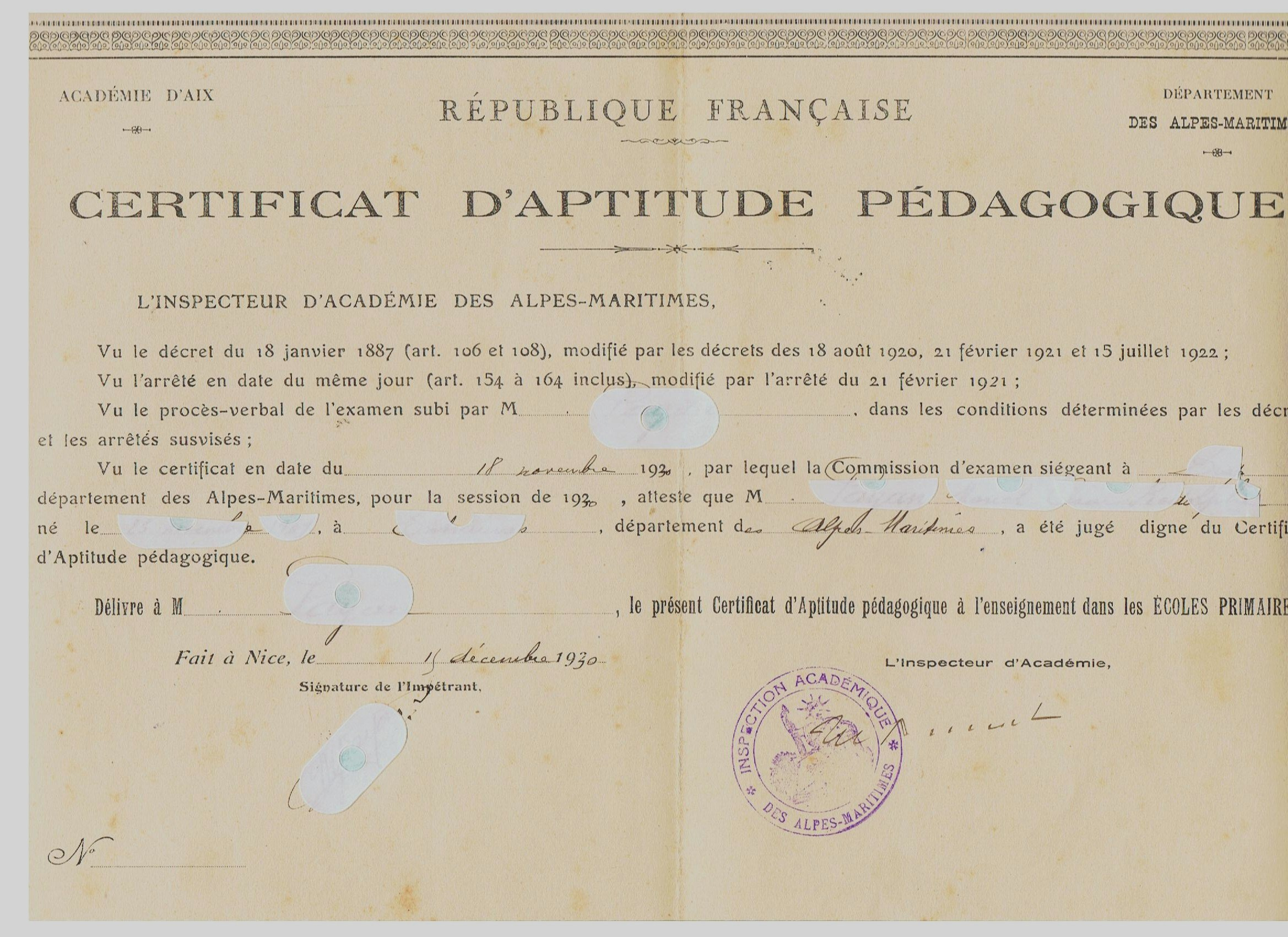
Certificate of Pedagogical Aptitude (CAP) for teaching in primary schools.

=== The failed Popular Front reforms of 1936-1937 ===
A major educational project for the democratization of education - proposed by Jean Zay, Minister of National Education and Fine Arts in the Léon Blum government - was stopped in 1937 by the conservative majority in the Senate under the Popular Front (1936–1937). In terms of teacher training, it envisaged that primary school teachers would be awarded the baccalaureate, prepared in three years in the lycées by normaliens and normaliennes, who would remain trainees in the normal schools, where they would receive two years of modernized professional training.

=== Vichy regime ===
Under the Vichy regime (1940–1944), the superior certificate and the normal schools were abolished by decree on August 15, 1941, and a small number of future primary school teachers were recruited through an entrance examination from among students able to continue their studies after the second year of secondary school in the so-called "bourgeois" curriculum. After the first three years in lycée, which culminated in the baccalauréat, they had to complete an internship in one of the instituts pédagogiques (33 for boys and 33 for girls). Jean Zay, the former Minister of Education and Fine Arts under the Front Populaire, described this internship as "derisory" in his prison diary. However, on March 15, 1944, the Conseil National de la Résistance (CNR - National Council of the Resistance) adopted its government program for a major democratic reform of the school system and education.

=== After the Second World War ===
==== The failed reforms of the National Council of the Resistance ====
At the time of the Liberation (1944–1945), the commission appointed on November 8, 1944, by René Capitant, minister of the GPRF, and chaired by Charles de Gaulle, was to draw up a major democratic reform of education. Its proposals, adopted unanimously, became known as the Langevin-Wallon plan. Future primary school teachers (aged 3 to 18) were to be recruited after the baccalauréat, and the plan provided for "a special system of scholarships to ensure that the recruitment of teachers remains popular [...] And it was only after obtaining the baccalauréat of their choice that future teachers of general or specialized subjects would spend their two pre-university years in normal schools. There they were to receive a dual training: practical training in contact with the schoolchildren of the secondary schools and specialized theoretical training to prepare them for the universities". The two years of normal schooling would be followed by two years of university studies. However, this modernist plan was adopted too late and was only presented on June 19, 1947 (after the end of the MRP-SFIO-PCF "tripartisme" and amid the Cold War). It was never implemented by the "Third Force" governments of the Fourth Republic, and the old division between "popular" primary education and "bourgeois" secondary education remained.

==== Re-establishment of normal schools in 1945 ====
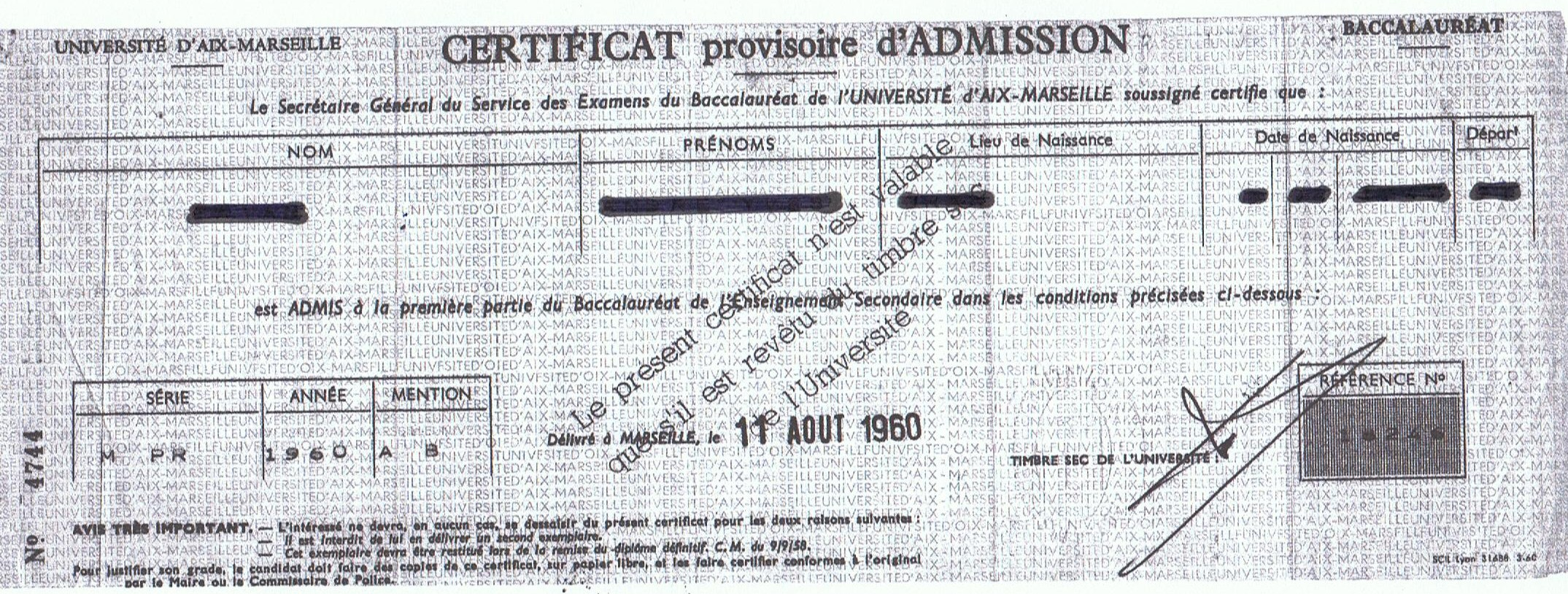
Certificate of admission to the first part of the Baccalauréat Moderne prime (M') at the end of the second year of study (class of 1st M').

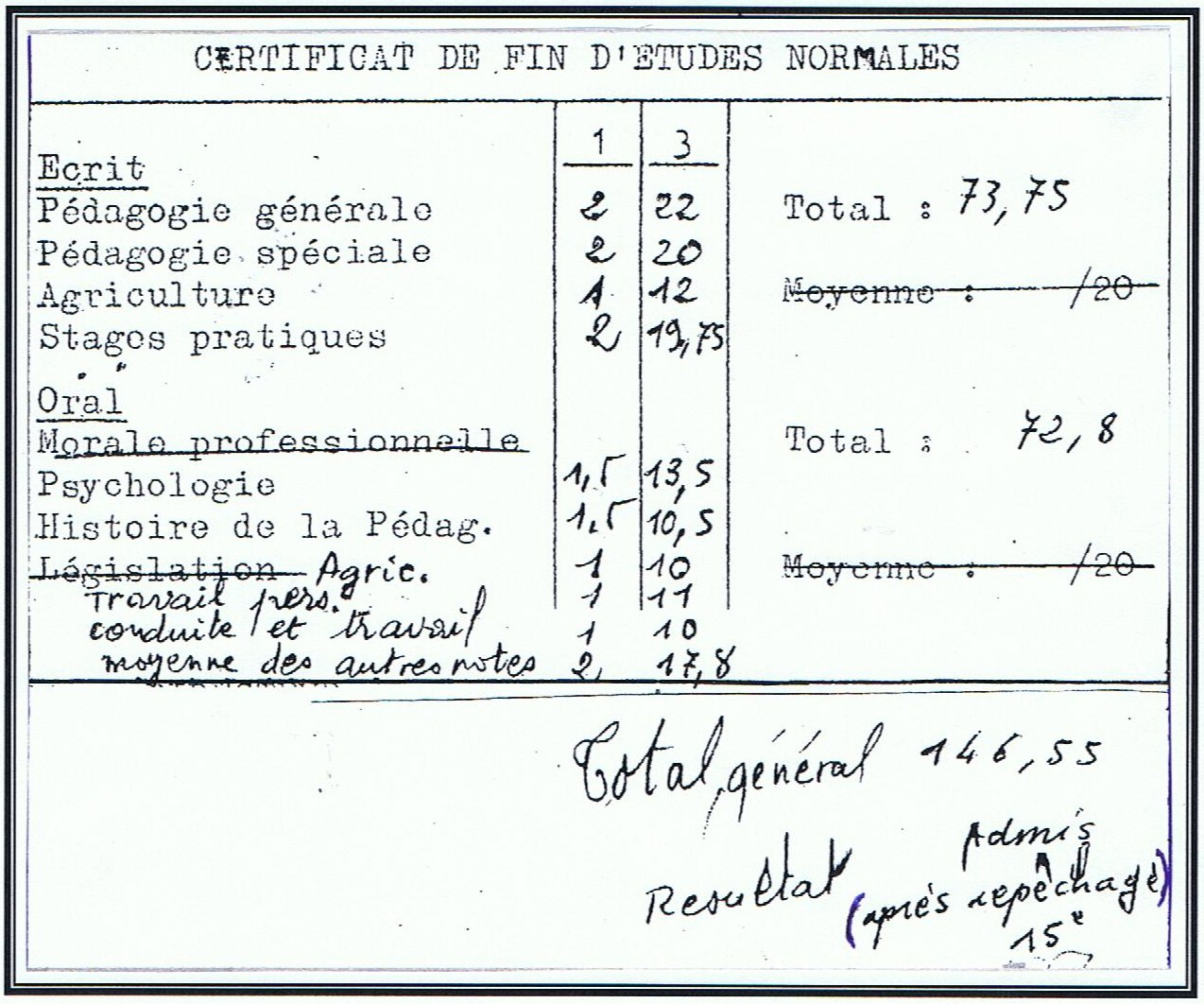
CFEN (Certificat de fin d'études normales) is required for appointment as a trainee teacher.

The normal schools were re-established after the Liberation in 1945, but recruitment was mainly aimed at third-year students from the "popular" complementary courses, the largest of which had a "special third-year" class to prepare them for the highly selective entrance exam to the normal schools for boys and girls.

Those admitted were obliged to complete a four-year training program, including preparation for the baccalaureate, in the normal schools. The first two years of training correspond to the second M' and first M' classes, and in the second year, they prepare for the two sessions in February and June of the first part of the baccalauréat "série Moderne prime (M')", with a single modern foreign language and no ancient languages (Latin or Greek), but with an examination in natural sciences. The third year corresponds to the terminal class, with preparation for the June session of the second part of the baccalauréat "Sciences expérimentales" (known as Science-ex). The fourth year is a year of both theoretical and professional training, with internships in primary school classes, particularly in the annex school. The fourth year would culminate in an examination - the famous CFEN (Certificat de fin d'études normales) - that students have to pass to qualify for the position of trainee teacher. At the end of their first term as teachers, after an inspection of their class, they have to pass the CAP to finally become full-fledged primary school teachers, and therefore category B civil servants. If they fail, they become "substitute" teachers, just like those who had not obtained their CFEN at the end of their fourth year of normal school, and therefore also like those recruited based on diplomas, who were also not tenured until they obtained their CAP.

==== The internal promotion of aspiring teachers (from 1945 onwards) ====
According to André Payan-Passeron's study, under the Third Republic, outstanding aspiring teachers (boys and girls) could take the examination for a fourth year, in other words, special classes, such as those at the normal school for boys in Versailles. These classes prepared them for the entrance exam to the École Normale Supérieure in Saint-Cloud (founded in 1882) for boys and Fontenay-aux-Roses (founded in 1880) for girls. From there, they went on to become teachers and then directors of normal schools, or primary school inspectors.

Under the Fourth and Fifth Republics, those with the best academic results in their second year were then eligible for a scholarship to attend their third year in one of the two mixed regional classes in the main town of the Académie. Either the class preparing for the elementary mathematics baccalaureate (known as the bac math-élem) at the normal school for boys, for those strong in math-physics and chemistry, or the class preparing for the philosophy baccalaureate (known as the bac philo) at the normal school for girls, for those with the most talent in literary subjects. At the end of this class, depending on their ranking and subject to having passed the baccalauréat, they could - on the advice of the teachers' council and the decision of the Inspector of the Académie - either enter a preparatory class for the entrance exam to the Ecole Normale Supérieure at Saint-Cloud (for boys) or Fontenay-aux-Roses (for girls), or be appointed as trainees in a two-year regional training center for middle school teachers, or return to their original normal school.

In addition, at the end of their third or even fourth year at a normal school, some of them - among the most outstanding - could in turn obtain a scholarship to be appointed as trainees in one of these two-year regional education centers for secondary school teachers (PEGc), attached to a normal school in the main town of the Académie. In these educational centers, they received remuneration as trainee civil servants and were responsible for their accommodation, while benefiting from their student status when it came to (CROUS) university canteens at reduced rates. They were required to attend theoretical training courses in both pedagogy and the subjects they were to teach: French and history-geography, French and modern foreign languages, mathematics and science... They were also required, once a term, to undertake a one-month internship, first in a primary school class (CP to CM2) and then in a secondary school class (6e to 3e).

Given these constraints, they could only partially attend courses at the faculty in which they were entitled to enroll: the Faculty of Letters and Humanities for literary students, and the Faculty of Science for scientists, excluding the faculties of law and medicine. They then benefited from dual training, both professional and academic, with the possibility of taking the university certificate for the first year of university studies, and thus possibly being admitted to the IPES (Instituts préparatoires à l'enseignement du second degré), where they were paid as trainee teachers for three years to prepare for their teaching license and the CAPES (Certificat d'aptitude pédagogique à l'enseignement secondaire) examination, or for 4 years to prepare for a DES (diplôme d'études supérieures) and take the agrégation examination to become certified or chartered teachers in collèges or lycées. Those who were not fortunate enough to be admitted to the IPES (given the very low number of places available), had to pass the written and oral tests for the CFEN - CEG at the end of their two years at the education center, to qualify for a middle school teaching post in their home department. If they failed to do so, they were appointed as substitute teachers, that is, as non-tenured teachers who could be dismissed at any time.

This was the initial situation for the majority of male and female primary school teachers, who, recruited based on diplomas (BE or BS then baccalauréat) without having attended a normal school, had to wait many years before obtaining their CAP and thus becoming tenured category B civil servants with their posts.

There was also another route open to athletically gifted aspiring teachers after their fourth year at a normal school. This was the entrance examination for the IREPS (Instituts régionaux d'éducation physique et sportive), which provided a three-year training course for physical education and sports teachers, enabling some of them to pass the competitive entrance examination for the ENSEPS (l'école normale supérieure d'éducation physique et sportive) in Paris.

=== The role of normal schools in the education of the teaching elite ===
With the possibility of promotion to secondary school for some, the opportunity for others to become primary school principals, and, for some, a successful career in the private sector, the normal schools were a powerful "social elevator" for those from working-class backgrounds. This makes it all the more understandable that the majority of serving primary school teachers did not go through the entrance examinations to the normal schools, but were recruited directly by the education inspectors resident in each departmental capital as substitute teachers based on their diplomas. In this way, the effective social role played by the normal schools since their creation becomes clearer: the education of members of the teaching elite, from pedagogues such as Célestin Freinet to educational innovators, as well as administrative staff, particularly managers and inspectors.

=== IUFMs replace normal schools ===
After 1973, the entrance examination for normal schools was postponed until after the baccalauréat, with professional training extended from one to two years, as envisaged in part by the 1947 Langevin-Wallon plan.

In 1990–1991, IUFM (Instituts Universitaires de Formation des Maîtres) replaced normal schools, following the Jospin Law of July 10, 1989.

=== From IUFM to INSPÉ ===
Under the July 8, 2013 law of orientation and programming for the refoundation of the school of the Republic, ESPEs (Écoles supérieures du professorat et de l'éducation) succeeded IUFMs, and entrance examinations to the teaching profession are accessible with enrolment in the first year of a Master's degree. Under the July 26, 2019 law for a school of confidence, ESPEs are renamed INSPÉ (Instituts nationaux supérieurs du professorat et de l'éducation).

In 2025, the government introduced a major reform of teacher education and recruitment scheduled to take effect from 2026–2027. The reform moves most teaching recruitment competitive examinations (including the CRPE and CAPES) from Master’s level (Bac+5) to the third year of undergraduate study (bac+3). Successful candidates will then complete a two-year salaried Professional Master’s programme in the Instituts nationaux supérieurs du professorat et de l’éducation (INSPÉ). The reform also introduces a new undergraduate degree, the Licence Professorat des Écoles (LPE), designed specifically for future primary school teachers. The stated aims of the reform are to improve teacher recruitment, strengthen professional preparation, and address ongoing teacher shortages in France. This reform continues a long pattern of institutional restructuring in French teacher education, following earlier transitions from the Écoles normales to the IUFM, ESPE and INSPÉ.
