= Rateau =

Rateau or Râteau may refer to:

== People ==
- Armand-Albert Rateau (1882-1938), French furniture maker and interior designer
- Auguste Rateau (1863–1930), French engineer
- Jean-Pierre Rateau (1800–1887), French lawyer and politician
- Michel Rateau (born 1938), French composer
- Robert Rateau (born 1975), Mauritian international footballer

== Other ==
- Le Râteau, mountain in the French Alps
