= Michel Rateau =

French composer (1938–2020)

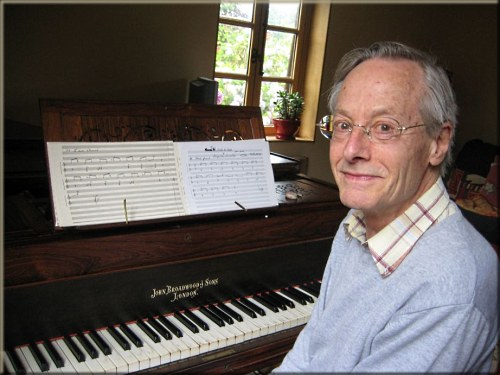
Michel Rateau

Michel Rateau (4 September 1938 Paris – 16 October 2020 Bois-Guillaume) was a French composer known for his contributions to choral, orchestral, ensemble, and instrumental music.

== Biography ==
Michel Rateau began studying solfège and piano at the age of five at Notre Dame de France in Vanves. At the same age, he composed his first work in his parents' kitchen using everyday objects.

Rateau attended a number of music courses throughout his childhood, studying under Sister Marie-Laurent up to the age of 11; then taking private piano courses with the organist Jean Boguet up to the age of 15. He then attended the classes of Jacques Février and Jean Doyen.

Attracted to Composition, Rateau enrolled in the Conservatoire National Supérieur de Musique et de Danse de Paris in 1959. He attended the classes of André Jolivet and Jean Rivier and begin studying under the supervision of the CNSM Professor of Harmony, Maurice Duruflé. He passed the Musical Education, CAPES (upper national teaching diploma) in 1960 and carried out National Military Service in the Band of the 93rd Infantry Regiment at Fort Mont-Valérien from 1962 to 1964.

Rateau was awarded the First Prize for Harmony in 1963 and the First Prize for Composition in 1966 from the Conservatoire National Supérieur de Musique et de Danse de Paris. In 1967 he won Premier Grand Prix de Rome, a French national upper artistic award allowing the winner to spend time at the Villa Medici in Rome, Italy.

Rataeu lived at the Villa Medici from 1968 to 1971. Shortly after his return to Paris, he turned his focus to sounds emitted by unconventional instruments (such as bird cage, pipes, and tanks) and recorded them on magnetic tapes. This led to the score of "La Course" ("The Race") a ballet for the Paris Théâtre National Populaire (TNP) performed by Joseph Russillo's company and a concert at the Musée d'Art Moderne de la Ville de Paris within the frame of the A.R.C. (Animation, Research, Confrontation) ordered by Maurice Fleuret. Throughout these years, Rateau continued to compose orchestral scores.

As reported by Billboard in 1975, Rateau instigated a new musical style founded on what the composer called "sounds of nature and every-day life". The report said "he has recorded the sounds of printing machines, car engines, pots and pans, garden tools, and claims it is not musique concrète but music composed and arranged on tape by the elements producing the sound."

In 1976, Rateau settled in Rouen, and resumed his teaching activities at the Rouen IUFM (Institut Universitaire de Formation des Maîtres – i.e. University Institute for Teachers' Training). He also taught at the Rouen Institute of Musicology from 1980 to 1989 and at the École Normale de Musique de Paris from 1983 to 1990, as a teacher of harmony and analysis.

In 1982 Rateau started the "Chants du Temps" ("Time Songs") for orchestra which he finished in 1988.

While teaching full-time, he had "Offrande Lyrique" ("Lyrical Offering") for violin and orchestra played in concert at the Salle Gaveau in Paris in 1984 by Ensemble orchestral de Paris conducted by Jean-Pierre Wallez with Gaëtane Prouvost (born 1954) as a solo violin. To his joy, Maestros Olivier Messiaen and Henri Dutilleux attended this concert. The Rouen Chamber Orchestra played this work again in 1984, conducted by Jean-Pierre Berlingen.

For the 25th anniversary of the University of Rouen Normandy in 1991, Rateau composed a "Quatre" for flute, clarinet, violin and piano for the Nouvel ensemble Contemporain (The New Contemporary group), created in concert in 1991.

In 1992 Rateau began "Les Chants du Temps" for the piano, his Journal Musical (Musical Diary), "A Work in Progress of Unachievement". "Chants du Temps" returned to a very simple, quite purified, strongly melodic, and contrapuntal form of writing, which contrasts radically with the pioneering pieces he wrote in 1960–1970. It consists of a modulable composition in fifteen volumes, each volume enclosing twelve books and each book containing twelve pages of music. Like a collection of poems, according to his mood and his preferences, the reader-interpreter will choose pieces to be read or played without restraint.

Part of the "Chants du Temps" was played in concert at the University of Strasbourg in April 2005, on the occasion of the Cultural Action Days. The Israeli pianist Gilead Mishory (born 1960) has performed excerpts of this work in Germany and Japan.

== Works ==
1966–1972:

- "Copeaux de lune" (Moon chips), for two pianos – Paris Biennal, Musée d'Art Moderne de la Ville de Paris (1966) – Editions Billaudot – duration: 11 minutes.
- "Divertimento", for two pianos – 1st prize for composition, Paris CNSM (1966) – duration: 13 minutes 30 seconds
- "Voyageur où t'en vas-tu?" ("Traveler, Where Are You going?"), Cantata on a poem by Rabindranath Tagore, for soprano, tenor, baritone, bass, and orchestra – Orchestre de l'Opéra national de Paris, Institut de France (1967) – duration: 25 minutes. OCLC 842337723 (music score).
- "Divertimento Breve", for orchestra – RAI National Symphony Orchestra, Rome (1968) – duration: 5 minutes 30 seconds
- "Seuil" (Threshold), for a set of percussions – RAI (television) percussions, Rome (1969) – Work retransmitted on France Musique – duration: 10 minutes 30 seconds
- "Concerto", for orchestra – RAI National Symphony Orchestra, Rome (1970) – duration: 12 minutes
- "Sonnant" (Sounding), for orchestra – order from Radio France (1971) – duration: 12 minutes
- "Trois musiques pour un citoyen" ("Three Musical Pieces for a Citizen"), for orchestra – order from Radio France (1972) – Editions Billaudot – transcription for two pianos – duration: 18 minutes

Music on tape:

- "La Course" ("The Race"), music for ballet represented at the Paris Théâtre National Populaire (TNP) by the Joseph Russillo's company retransmitted on the television (1970) – duration: 26 minutes
- 1975: Music in concert at the Musée d'Art Moderne de la Ville de Paris – duration: 45 minutes:
1. "Cage" ("Cage")
2. "Tuiles" ("Tiles")
3. "Outils de Jardin" ("Garden Tools")
4. "Tubulure" ("Pipe")
5. "Mécaniques" ("Mechanics")
- 1973–1976:
1. "Enfances" ("Childhoods") (15:00)
2. "Flûtes" ("Flutes") (7:20)
3. "Cloches" ("Bells") (5:40)
4. "Tintamarresque et Farce" ("Noise and Trick") (12:00)
5. "Concerto pour Guitare" ("Concerto for Guitar") (25:00)
6. "Couvercles" ("Covers") (4:30)
7. "Pièces de Voitures" ("Spare Car Parts") (5:30)
8. "Eléments de Cuisine Avec Piano" ("Kitchen Elements With Piano") (6:30)
9. "La Bête" (The Beast) (2:40)
10. "Temps-Monde" ("Time-World") (13:00)

Other, 1972:

- "Matinale" ("Morning") (3:30), for flute and piano. Éditions Alphonse Leduc, publisher (1972) OCLC 30655251.
- "Sonnant" ("Sounding") (3:10), for trumpet and piano in C or B♭ – Instrumental piece ordered by Éditions Alphonse Leduc, publisher (1972). OCLC 32643497.

Piece for Paris CNSM competitive examination:

- "Fiction" for horn and piano – Max Eschig, publisher (1974) – duration: 5 minutes. OCLC 32182955, 658363177.
- "Dialogue avec l'oiseau La" ("Dialogue With the Bird, 'La'") for flute and piano – Max Eschig, publisher (1975) – duration: 5 minutes. OCLC 15169146, 658372575.
- "Nature morte à la contrebasse" ("Still-Life With Contrabass") – Francis Salabert, publisher (1981) – duration: 5 minutes. OCLC 50162774, 895358251, 658421652.

Other, 1979–2007:

- "Comme Union" ("Like Union") for brass quintet – Order from ARS NOVA, Conducted by Marius Constant (1979) – duration: 15 minutes
- "Lumen" for strings – Rouen Chamber Orchestra, conducted by Jean-Claude Bernède (1980) – duration: 20 minutes
- "Offrande Lyrique" ("Lyrical Offering") for violin and orchestra – ordered by the Orchestre de chambre de Paris (1981) – duration: 18 minutes
- "Chants du Temps" ("Time Songs") in four books for orchestra (1982–1988) – duration: 1 hour 50 minutes
- "Audite" for orchestra (1989) – duration: 11 minutes
- "Intervalle" ("Interval") for strings (1990) – duration: 5 minutes 30 seconds
- "Ephphata" for orchestra (1990) – duration: 7 minutes
- "Musique Geste Mouvement" ("Music Gesture Movement") for two pianos (1990) – duration: 13 minutes 30 seconds
- "A quatre" ("At Four") for flute, clarinet, violin and piano – Created in concert by the New Contemporary Group on the 25th anniversary of University of Rouen Normandy (1991) – duration: 8 minutes 30 seconds
- "Chants du temps" ("Time Songs") for strings and wind instruments (2007) – duration 40 minutes
- "Les Chants du Temps" ("Time Songs") for piano, "Work in Course of Unachievement" (started in 1992) – total duration: about 20 hours – 16th volume in progress

== Notes ==
=== Sources ===
- Büsser, [Paul] Henri (1 September 1967). "Lá řévué Musicale: Concours de Rome de Compositíon Musicale à L'Académie Des Beaux-Arts" [Rome Competition of Musical Composition at the Academy of Fine Arts]. La Revue des Deux Mondes. Littérature, Histoire, Arts et Sciences (in French): 128. ISSN 0035-1962. JSTOR 44593244. OCLC 9978055651.
- Kahn, Henry (20 December 1975). "From the Music Capitals of the World: Paris" (PDF). Billboard. Vol. 87, no. 51. p. 51, col. 3 – via World Radio History (worldradiohistory.com)..
- "Nécrologie. Le Compositeur Rouennais Michel Rateau est Décédé" [Obituary. Rouen Composer Michel Rateau Has Died]. Paris-Normandie (in French). 25 October 2020. ISSN 0999-2154. OCLC 472498041 (all editions).
- "Prix de Rome, 1960–1968. 1967 – Michel Rateau (1938–)". musimem.com (in French). Musica et Memoria..
- Rekward, Susan Jean (1997). The Horn at the Paris Conservatoire and Its Morceaux de Concours to 1996. Appendix C: Morceaux de Concours for Horn, 1897–1996 (Masters Thesis). Denton, Texas: University of North Texas. pp. 47–53. OCLC 38224306, 928060501. Full document; page 50
