= Franz Xaver Richter =

Austro-Moravian singer, violinist, composer, conductor and music theoretician

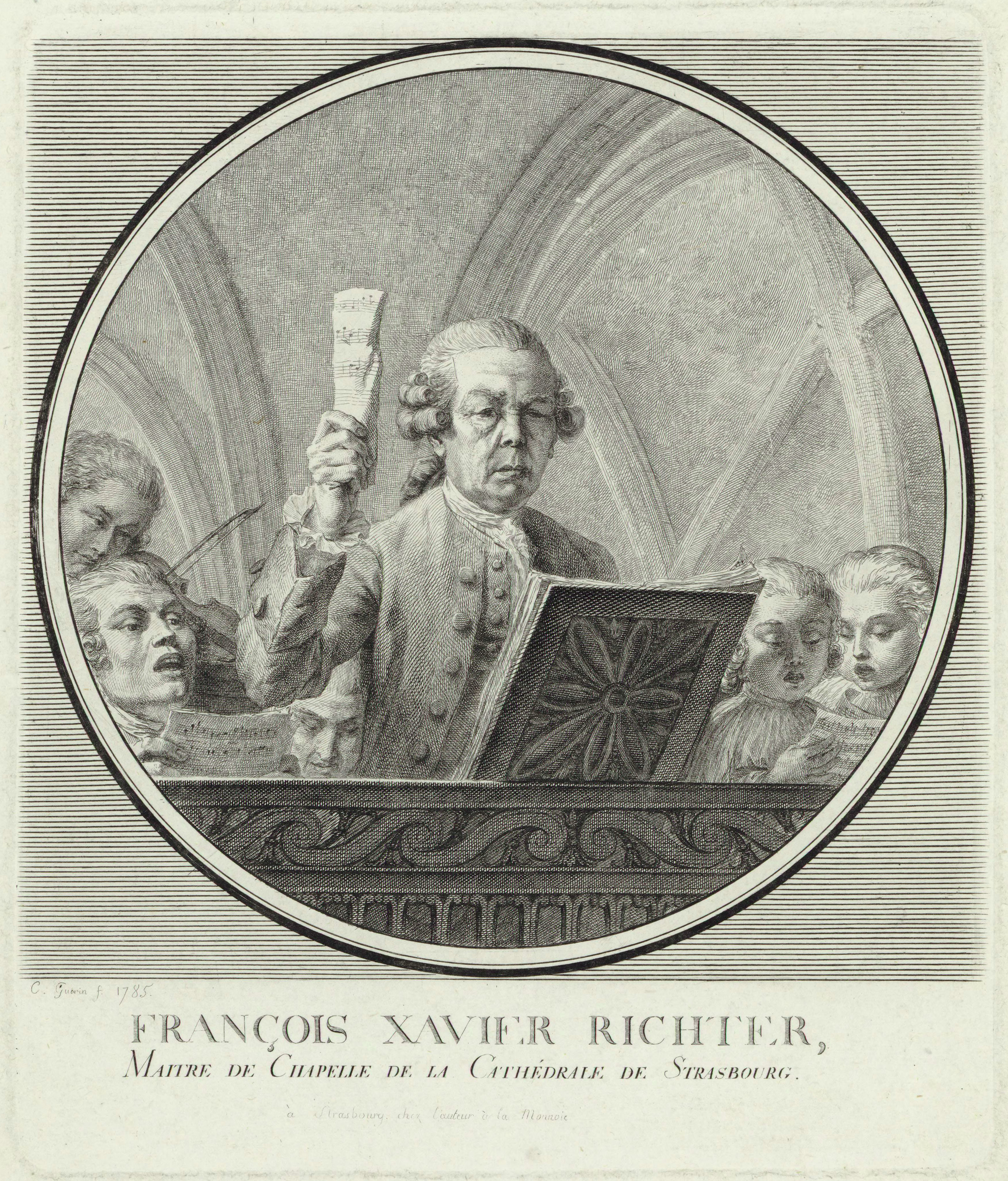
Engraving of Richter by Christophe Guérin, 1785

Franz (Czech: František) Xaver Richter, known as François Xavier Richter in France (December 1, 1709 – September 12, 1789) was an Austro-Moravian singer, violinist, composer, conductor and music theoretician who spent most of his life first in Austria and later in Mannheim and in Strasbourg, where he was music director of the cathedral. From 1783 on, Haydn's favourite pupil, Ignaz Pleyel, was his deputy director.

The most traditional of the first-generation composers of the so-called Mannheim school, he was highly regarded in his day as a contrapuntist. As a composer he was equally at home in the concerto and the "strict church style". Mozart heard a mass by Richter on his journey back from Paris to Salzburg in 1778 and called it "charmingly written". Richter, as a contemporary engraving clearly shows, must have been one of the first conductors to actually have conducted with a music sheet roll in his hand.

Richter wrote chiefly symphonies, concertos for woodwinds as well as trumpet, and chamber and church music, his masses receiving special praise. He was a man of a transitional period, and his symphonies in a way constitute one of the missing links between the generation of Bach and Handel and the "First Viennese school". Although sometimes contrapuntal in a learned way, Richter's orchestral works nevertheless exhibit considerable drive and verve. Until a few years ago, apparently the only available recordings of Richter's music were performances of his trumpet concerto in D major, but recently a number of chamber orchestras and ensembles have included many of his pieces, particularly symphonies and concertos, in their repertoires.

== Biography ==
=== 1709–1739 Origins and education ===
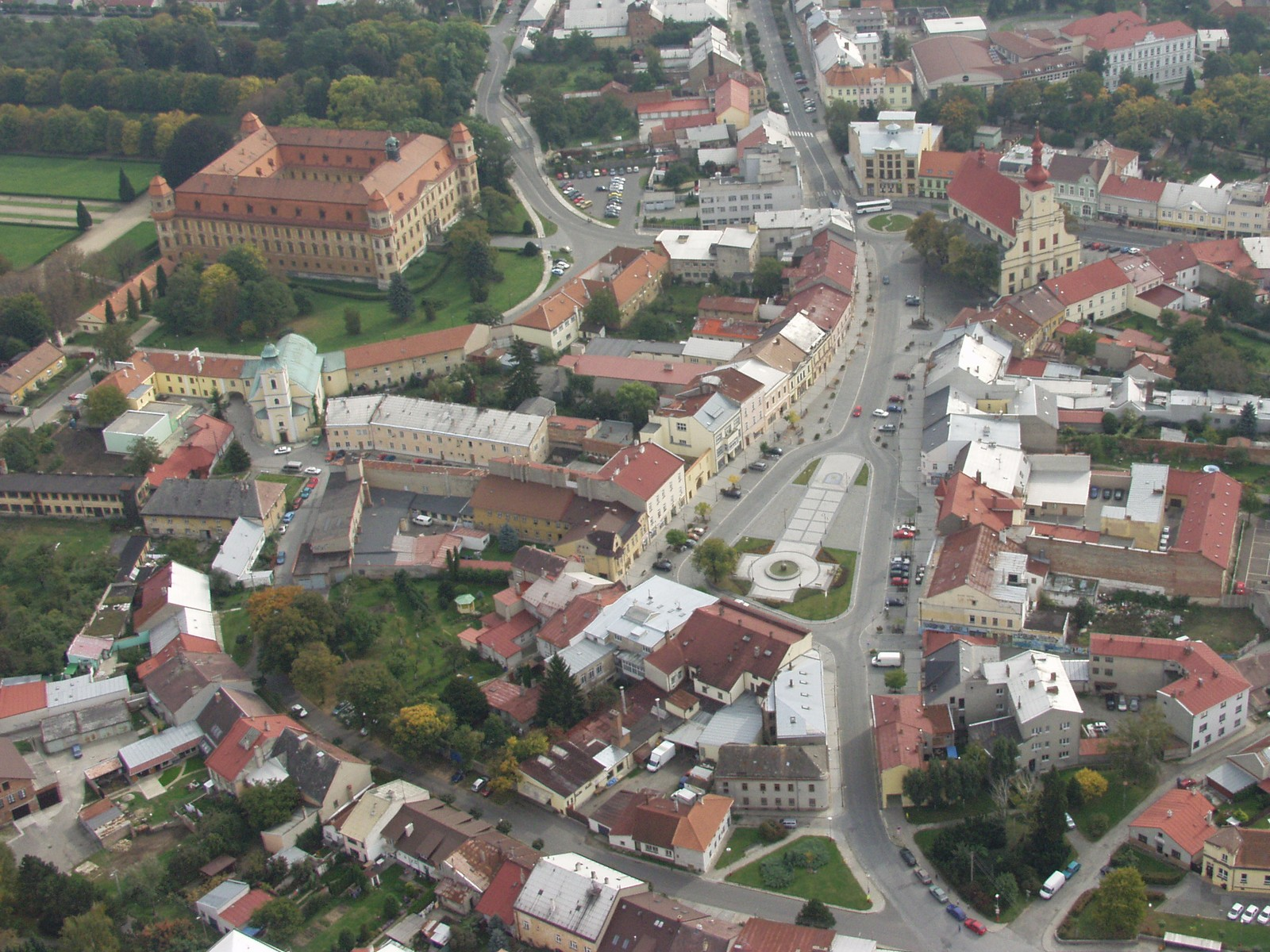
Holešov (modern view)

Franz Xaver Richter was probably born in Holleschau (now Holešov), Moravia (then part of the Habsburg monarchy, now the Czech Republic), although this is not entirely certain. There is no record of his birth in the Holleschau church register. In his employment contract with the Prince Abbot of Kempten it says that he hailed from Bohemia. The musicologist Friedrich Wilhelm Marpurg has Richter being from Hungarian descent, but on his Strasbourg death certificate it says: "ex Kratz oriundus".

Although his whereabouts until 1740 are nowhere documented, it is clear that Richter got a very thorough training in counterpoint and that this took place using the influential counterpoint treatise Gradus ad Parnassum by Johann Josef Fux; Richter may even have been Fux's pupil in Vienna. Richter's lifelong mastery of the strict church style which is particularly evident in his liturgical works but also shines through in his symphonies and chamber music, is testimony to his roots in the Austrian and south German Baroque music.

=== 1740–1747 Vize-Kapellmeister in Kempten ===
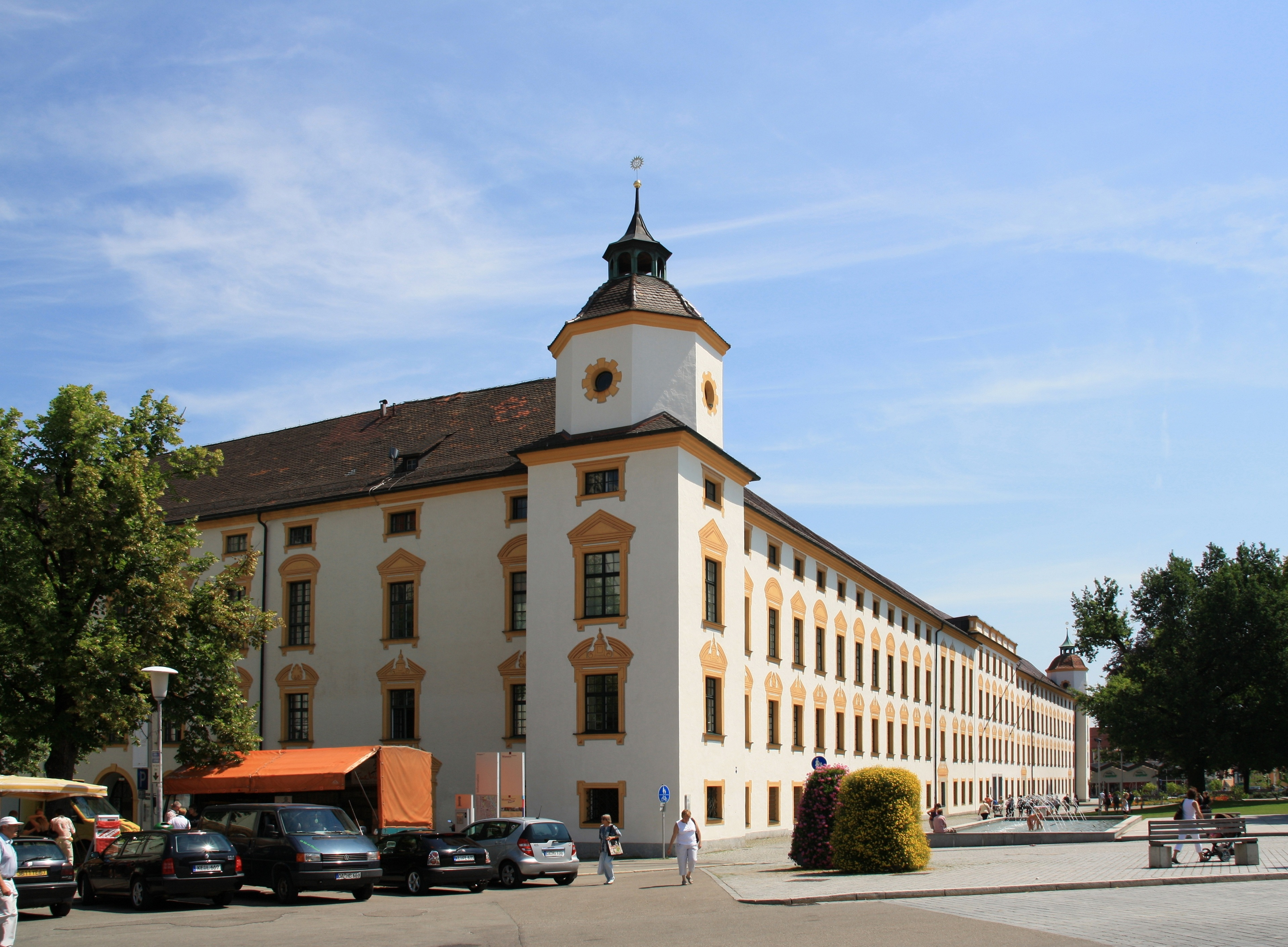
Fürststift Kempten (Modern view)

On April 2, 1740, Richter was appointed deputy Kapellmeister (Vize-Kapellmeister) to the Prince-Abbot Anselm von Reichlin-Meldeg of Kempten in Allgäu. Reichlin Meldeg as Prince Abbot presided over the Fürststift Kempten, a large Benedictine Monastery in what is now south-western Bavaria. The monastery certainly would have had a choir and probably a small orchestra (rather a band, as it was called then), as well, but this must have been a small affair. Richter stayed in Kempten for six years but it is hard to imagine that a man of his education and talents would have liked the idea of spending the rest of his life in this scenically beautiful but otherwise completely parochial town.

In February 1743 Richter married Maria Anna Josepha Moz, who was probably from Kempten. Twelve of Richter's symphonies for strings were published in Paris in the year 1744. It is assumed that Richter left Kempten already before the death of Reichlin-Meldeg in December 1747.

=== 1747–1768 Singer and Cammercompositeur in Mannheim ===
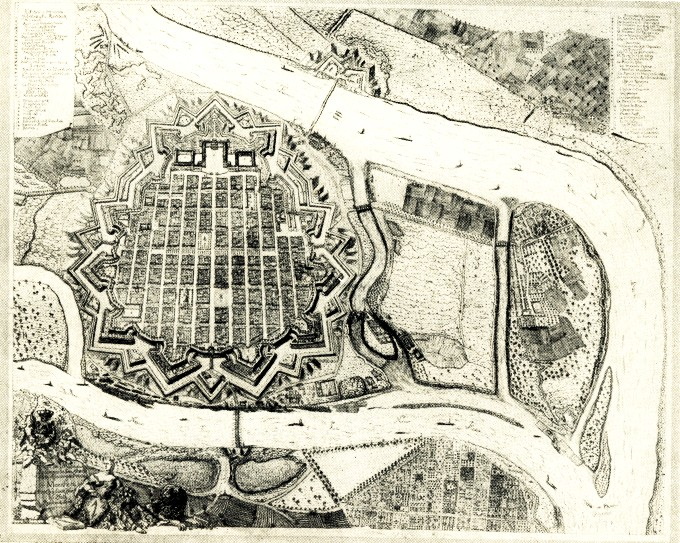
Mannheim (1755)

Just how much Richter must have disliked Kempten can be deduced from the fact that in 1747 his name appears among the court musicians of the Prince elector Charles Theodore in Mannheim – but not as music director or in any other leading function but as a simple singer (bass). Obviously Richter preferred being one among many (singers and orchestra combine numbered more than 70 persons) in Mannheim to acting deputy Kapellmeister in a small town like Kempten.

Because of his old fashioned, even reactionary music style Richter was not popular in Mannheim. The title awarded to him in 1768 as Cammercompositeur (chamber composer) seems to have been merely an honorary one. He was slightly more successful as a composer of sacred music and as music theoretician. In 1748 the Elector commissioned him to compose an oratorio for Good Friday, La deposizione dalla croce. It is sometimes concluded that this oratorio was not a success as there was only one performance and Richter was never commissioned to write another one.

Richter was also a respected teacher of composition. Between 1761 and 1767 he wrote a treatise on composition (Harmonische Belehrungen oder gründliche Anweisung zu der musikalischen Ton-Kunst oder regulären Komposition), based on Fux's Gradus ad Parnassum – the only representative of the Mannheim School to do so. The lengthy work in three tomes is dedicated to Charles Theodore. Among his more notable pupils were Joseph Martin Kraus, probably Carl Stamitz and Ferdinand Fränzl.

After 1768 Richter's name disappears from the lists of court singers. During his Mannheim years Richter made tours to the Oettingen-Wallerstein court in 1754 and later to France, the Netherlands and England where his compositions found a ready market with publishers.

It seems clear from Richter's compositions that he did not really fit in at the Mannheim court. Whereas his colleagues in the orchestra were interested in lively, energetic, homophonic music that focused on drive, brilliancy and sparkling orchestral effects gained from stock devices, Richter, rooted in the Austrian Baroque tradition, wrote music that was in a way reminiscent of Handel and of his teacher Fux. Thus, when in 1769 an opening at Strasbourg's cathedral became known Richter seems to have applied right away.

=== 1769–1789 Maitre de Chapelle de Notre-Dame de Strasbourg ===
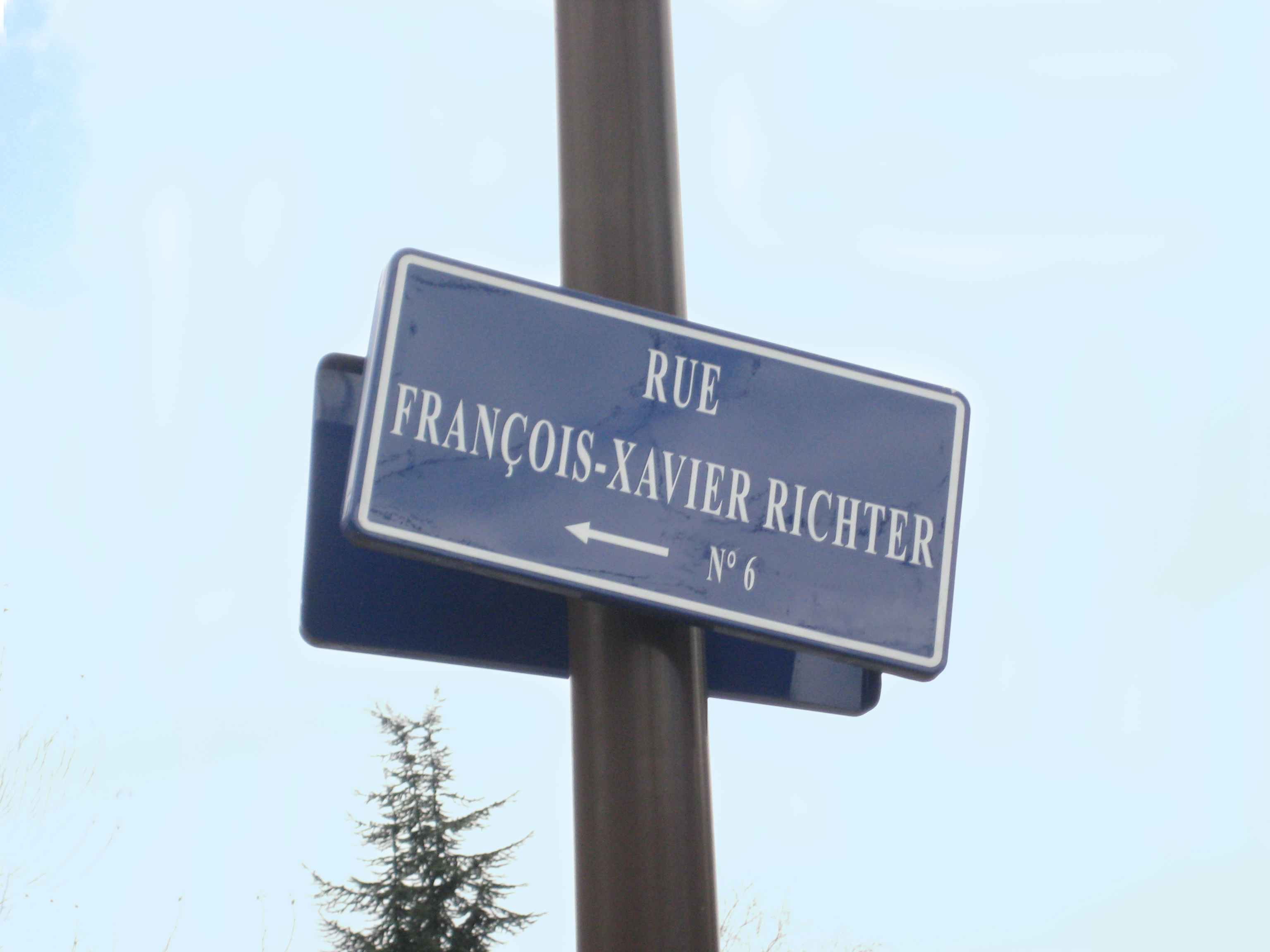
Strasbourg street sign "Rue François Xavier Richter" (2010)

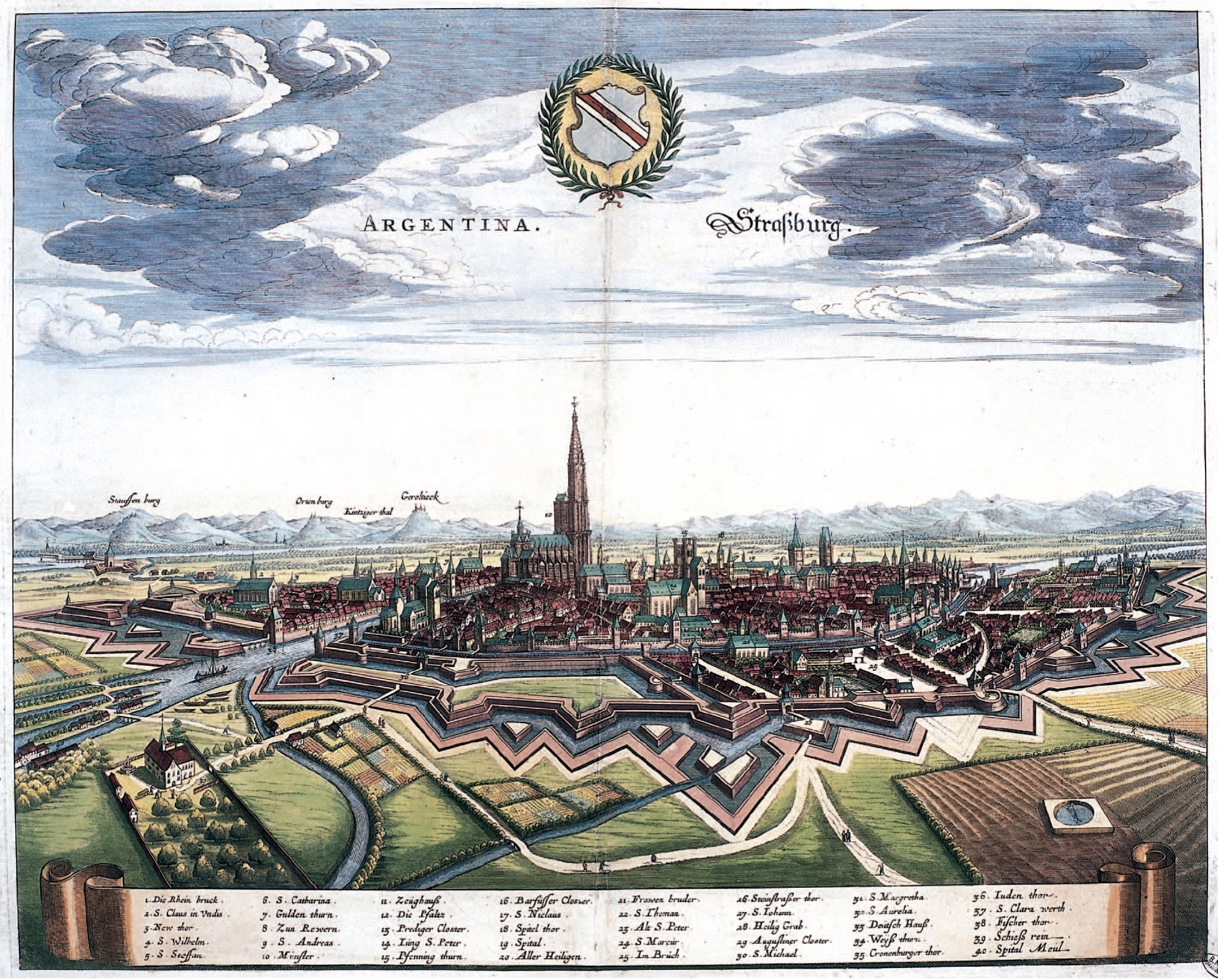
Strasbourg (ca. 1644)

In April 1769 he succeeded Joseph Garnier as Kapellmeister at Strasbourg Cathedral, where both his performing and composing activities turned increasingly to sacred music. He was by then recognized as a leading contrapuntist and church composer. Johann Sebastian Bach's first biographer, composer and musicologist Johann Nikolaus Forkel, wrote about Richter in 1782:

"Ist ein sehr guter Contrapunktist und Kirchenkomponist." ("Is a very good contrapuntist and church composer.")

In Strasbourg Richter also had to direct the concerts at the Episcopal court (today Palais Rohan); in addition to that he was for a time also in charge of the town concerts which were held at regular intervals. The main part of Richter's sacred music was composed during his Strasbourg years. He was active as a composer until his last year. During his last years Haydn's favourite pupil Ignaz Pleyel served as his assistant at the cathedral.

In 1787 he visited Munich, where he met Mozart's father Leopold one last time. In Munich he met most of his former colleagues of the Mannheim court orchestra who by then had moved to Munich to where the court had been transferred.

From 1783 on, and due to Richter's advanced age and declining health, Joseph Haydn's favourite pupil Ignaz Pleyel served as his assistant. He would succeed him at the post after his death.

Richter died, aged 79, at Strasbourg, in the year of the French Revolution. Thus he did not have to witness his deputy Ignaz Pleyel being forced to write hymns to praise the supreme being and the death by guillotine of Jean-Frédéric Edelmann, a gifted composer from Strasbourg.

=== 1770 Richter meets Marie Antoinette ===
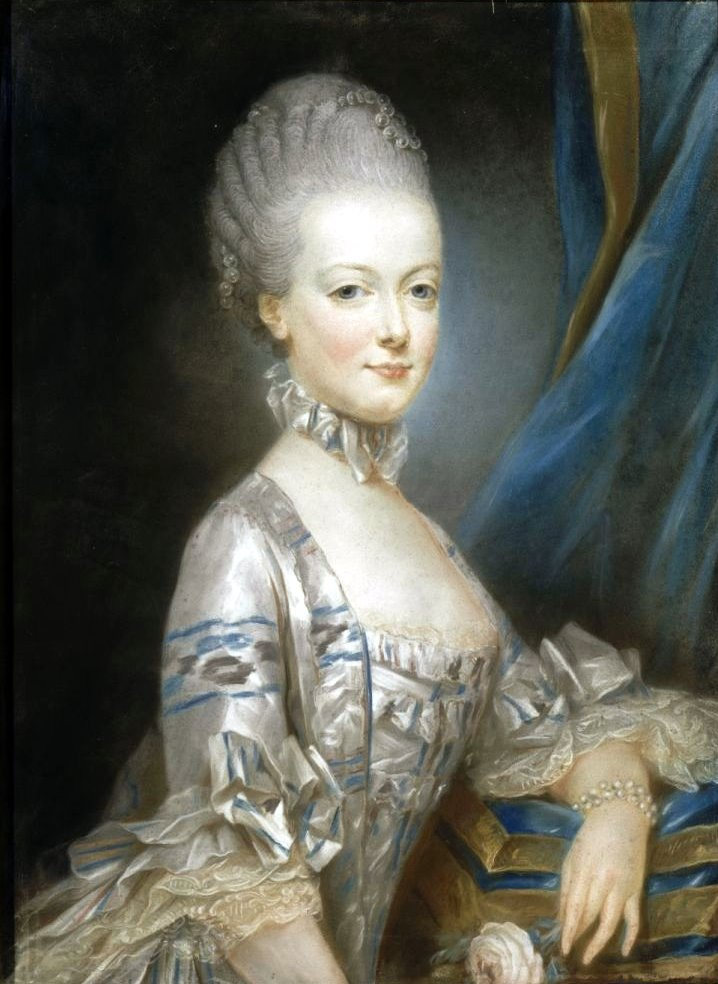
Marie Antoinette (1769)

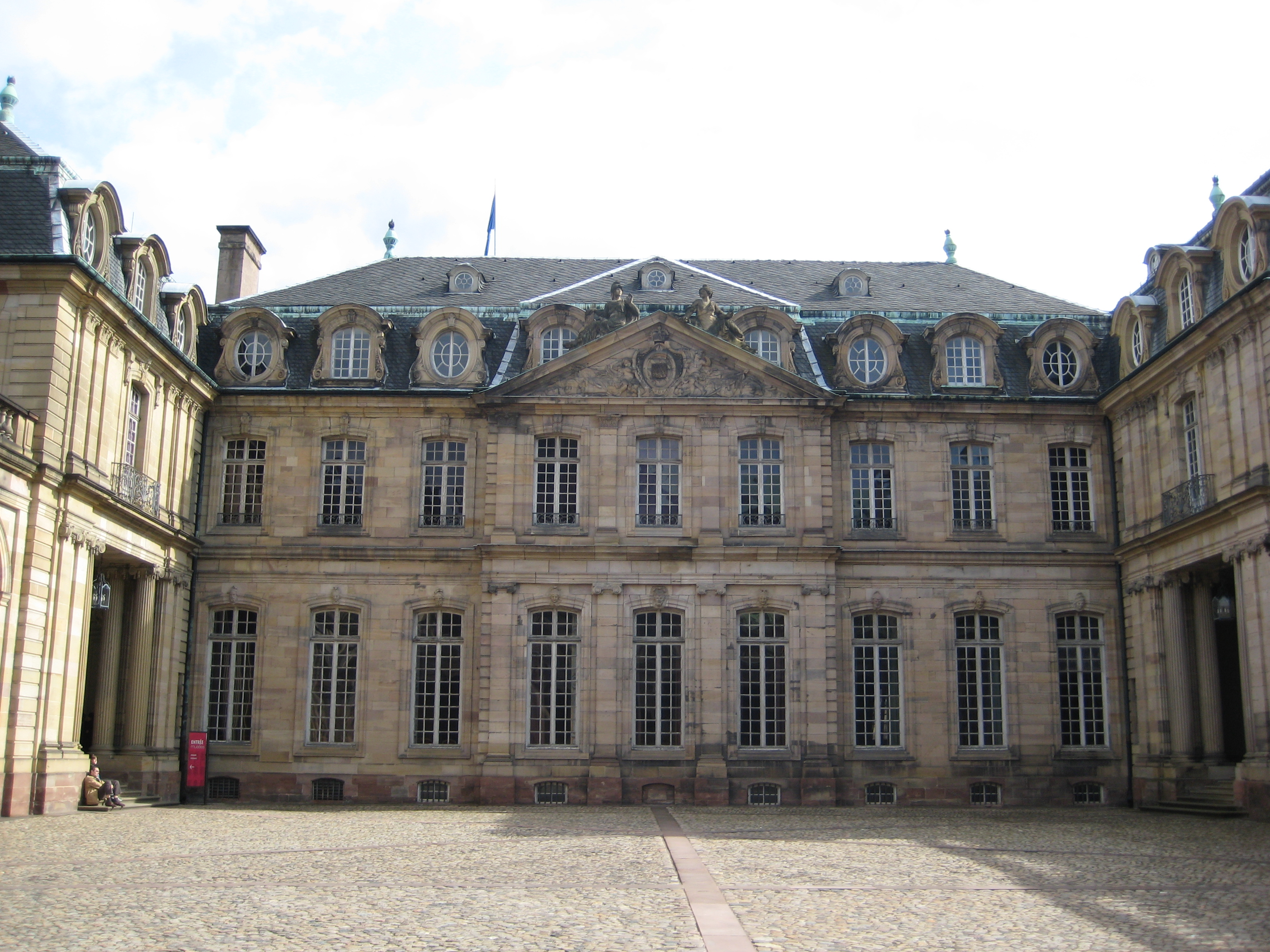
Strasbourg's Palais Rohan where Marie Antoinette stayed and where Richter conducted the Tafelmusik (Modern view)

In 1770 Marie Antoinette, future queen of France, on her way from Vienna to Paris passed through the Alsatian capital, where she stayed at the Episcopal Palace, the Palais Rohan. Richter composed a motet, Audin pulsantur, for this occasion. Richter, who almost certainly directed the church music when Marie Antoinette went to mass the next day, witnessed the earliest stages of historical events that would later contribute to the downfall of the French monarchy. The prelate who greeted Marie Antoinette on the steps of the cathedral, probably in Richter's presence, was the same Louis Rohan who would later, duped by a prostitute impersonating Marie Antoinette, trigger the Affair of the Diamond Necklace. Several historians and writers think that this bizarre episode undermined the trust of the French in their queen and thus hastened the onset of the French Revolution.

But Richter did not live to see this. What he saw was Strasbourg all dressed up to greet the Dauphiness:

"The city of Strasburg was in gala array. It had prepared for the dauphiness the splendours it had displayed 25 years before for the journey of Louis the Well-beloved. (...) Three companies of young children from twelve to fifteen years of age, habited as Cent-Suisses, formed the line along the passage of the princess. Twenty-four young girls of the most distinguished families of Strasbourg, dressed in the national costume, strewed flowers before her; and eighteen shepherds and shepherdesses presented her with baskets of flowers. (...)
On the following day (May 8, 1770) Marie Antoinette visited the cathedral. By a strange coincidence the prelate who awaited her with the chapter at the entrance to felicitate her, and who greeted her "the soul of Maria Theresa about to unite itself to the soul of the Bourbons", was the nephew of the bishop, that prince, Louis de Rohan, who was later to inflict upon the dauphiness, become queen, the deadliest of injuries. But in the midst of the then so brilliant prospect who could discern these shadows?"

=== 1778 Richter meets Mozart ===
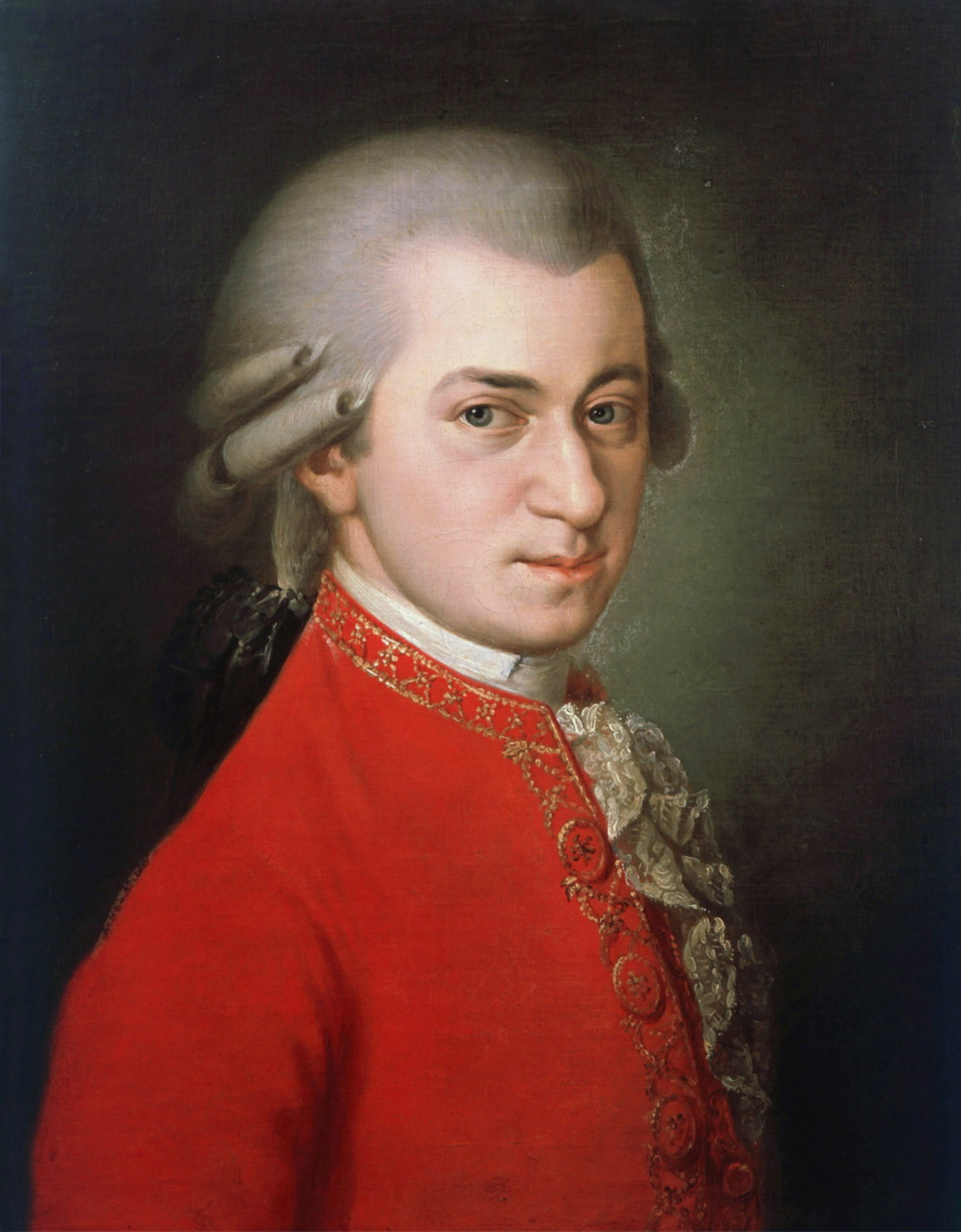
W. A. Mozart (1780)

Both Wolfgang Amadeus Mozart and his father Leopold knew Richter. Mozart would have met him still as a boy on his Family Grand tour in 1763 when the Mozart family came through Schwetzingen, the summer residence of the Elector Palatinate. Mozart met him once again in 1778 on his way back from Paris when he was headed for the unloved Salzburg after his plans to gain permanent employment in Mannheim or Paris had come to naught. In a letter to his father, dated November 2, 1778, Mozart seems to suggest that the by then elderly Richter was something of an alcoholic:

"Strasbourg can scarcely do without me. You cannot think how much I am esteemed and beloved here. People say that I am disinterested as well as steady and polite, and praise my manners. Everyone knows me. As soon as they heard my name, the two Herrn Silbermann [i. e. Andreas Silbermann and Johann Andreas Silbermann] and Herr Hepp (organist) came to call on me, and also Kapellmeister Richter. He has now restricted himself very much; instead of forty bottles of wine a day, he only drinks twenty! ... If the Cardinal had died, (and he was very ill when I arrived,) I might have got a good situation, for Herr Richter is seventy-eight years of age. Now farewell ! Be cheerful and in good spirits, and remember that your son is, thank God ! well, and rejoicing that his happiness daily draws nearer. Last Sunday I heard a new mass of Herr Richter's, which is charmingly written."

=== Early Symphony ===
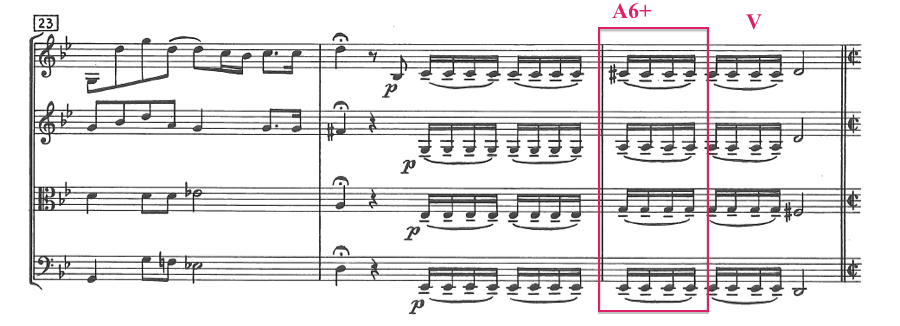
Example A. The Augmented Sixth Chord in m. 25

The Adagio and Fugue in G minor for Strings (1760) is one of Franz Xaver Richter's symphonies, which features the learned style in 18th century orchestral works. His experience in churches also contributes to his sophisticated contrapuntal style in his orchestral works. The first movement begins with the tonic key, G minor, entitled Adagio and fugue, and it distinguishes from later sonata form by Haydn and Mozart. The opening material is quite different from the primary theme in symphonies by Mozart and Haydn. First, the opening material is not highly melodically recognizable and easy to grasp for the audience. One could call it primary key area instead of the primary theme. It is in highly learned style with a lot of sequential passages. The music progresses until m. 23 when it reaches a structural V chord in the first section after an augmented sixth chord (m. 25) is emphasized (Example A). Again the music is still in the tonic key area when the fugue begins. The fugue subject is in g minor, and the answer is in d minor. The music goes to B♭ major for the first time in m. 60 after a V–I motion. The B♭ major passage starts another sequence until m. 67. The third tonal area in this piece is C major, starting after a French augmented sixth chord resolving to a dominant chord (G-B-D) in m. 120. A cadence on C major is elided in m. 217, the bass progresses to a D-G motion, sitting on the tonic key G minor in m. 222. Overall, the first movement includes two sections, Adagio (which can be seen as an introduction to fugue) and a fugue (in fugue form), which is very different from the sonata-allegro form composed by Mozart and Haydn. As Jochen Reutter acclaims, Franz Xaver Richter's compositional idiom "changed from a late Baroque sound to a tonal language which reached the threshold of the Classical style. He was influenced by the 18th-century learned style and he adapted the Mannheim symphonic style with his own differentiated instrumentation." Also according to Reutter, "his [Richter's] works from this period include such conservative traits as fugal techniques, Baroque sequences and the frequent use of minor tonality." As shown in this work Adagio and Fugue in G minor for Strings, the first movement is almost entirely based on various kinds of sequences and fugal style. This early symphony makes an intriguing subject for a scholarly study of early symphonies.

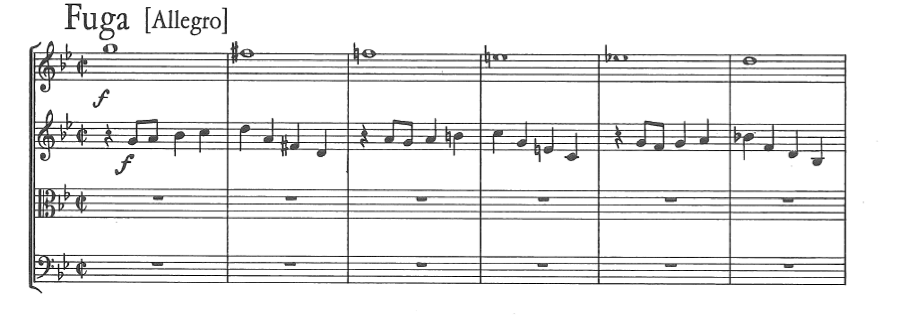
Example B

== Works (overview) ==
=== Orchestral ===
- Symphonies (approximately 80 are extant)
- Thereof: Grandes Symphonies 1-6 (Paris 1744)[Now published by Artaria Editions]
- Thereof: Grandes Symphonies 7–12 (Paris 1744)[Now published by Artaria Editions]
- Several concertos: flute and orchestra, oboe and orchestra, and trumpet and orchestra

=== Sacred music ===
- Kempten Te Deum for soli, choir and orchestra (1745)
- 39 Masses
- La Deposizione della Croce (Oratorio, 1748)
- Numerous motets and psalms.

=== Chamber music ===
- Sonate da camera Op. 2 Nr. 1-6 (sonatas for harpsichord, flute and violoncello)
- Seven String Quartets, Op. 5 Nr. 1, 2, 3, 4, 5, 5b, 6 (1757)

== Sources ==
- Blume, Friedrich, Hrsg. Die Musik in Geschichte und Gegenwart. Allgemeine Enzyklopädie der Musik. Ungekürzte elektronische Ausgabe der ersten Auflage. Kassel: Bärenreiter, 1949–1987.
- Forkel, Johann Nikolaus. Musikalischer Almanach für Deutschland auf das Jahr 1782. Leipzig: Im Schwickertschen Verlag, 1781.
- Funck-Brentano, Frantz. The Diamond Necklace. Translated by H. Sutherland Edwards. London: Greening & Co. LTD, 1911.
- Goncourt, Edmond et Jules de. Histoire de Marie Antoinette. Paris: G. Charpentier et Cie., 1884.
- Mozart, Wolfgang Amadeus. The Letters of Wolfgang Amadeus Mozart. Edited by Ludwig Nohl. Translated by Lady Wallace (i.e. Grace Jane Wallace). Vol. 1. 2 vols. New York: Hurd and Houghton, 1866.
- Randel, Don Michael, ed. The Harvard Biographical Dictionary of Music. Cambridge, Massachusetts: The Belknap Press of Harvard University Press, 1996. ISBN 0-674-37299-9
- Riemann, Hugo. Handbuch der Musikgeschichte. Die Musik des 18. und 19. Jahrhhunderts. Zweite, von Alfred Einstein durchgesehene Auflage. Bd. II. V Bde. Leipzig: Breitkopf & Härtel, 1922.
- Rocheterie, Maxime de la. The Life of Marie Antoinette. Translated by Cora Hamilton Bell. Vol. 1. 2 vols. New York: Dodd, Mead and Company, 1895.
- Slonimsky, Nicolas, ed. Baker's Biographical Dictionary of Musicians. 5th Completely Revised Edition. New York, 1958.
- Alfried Wieczorek, Hansjörg Probst, Wieland Koenig, Hrsg. Lebenslust und Frömmigkeit – Kurfürst Carl Theodor (1724–1799) zwischen Barock und Aufklärung. Bd. 2. 2 Bde. Regensburg, 1999. ISBN 3-7917-1678-6

== Discography (selection) ==
- Grandes Symphonies (1744), Nos. 1–6 (Set 1) (Helsinki Baroque, Hakkinen) NAXOS 8.557818
- Grandes Symphonies (1744), Nos. 7–12 (Set 2) (Helsinki Baroque, Hakkinen) NAXOS 8.570597
- Sonate da camera (1764): Nos. 1–3 (Fred, Peltoniemi, Hakkinen) NAXOS 8.572029
- Symphonies (London Mozart Players, Bamert) Chandos
- Seven String Quartets, Op. 5 (1757) (casalQuartet) Solo Musica SM 184 (2014)
