= Christophe Guérin =

French engraver and painter (1758–1831)

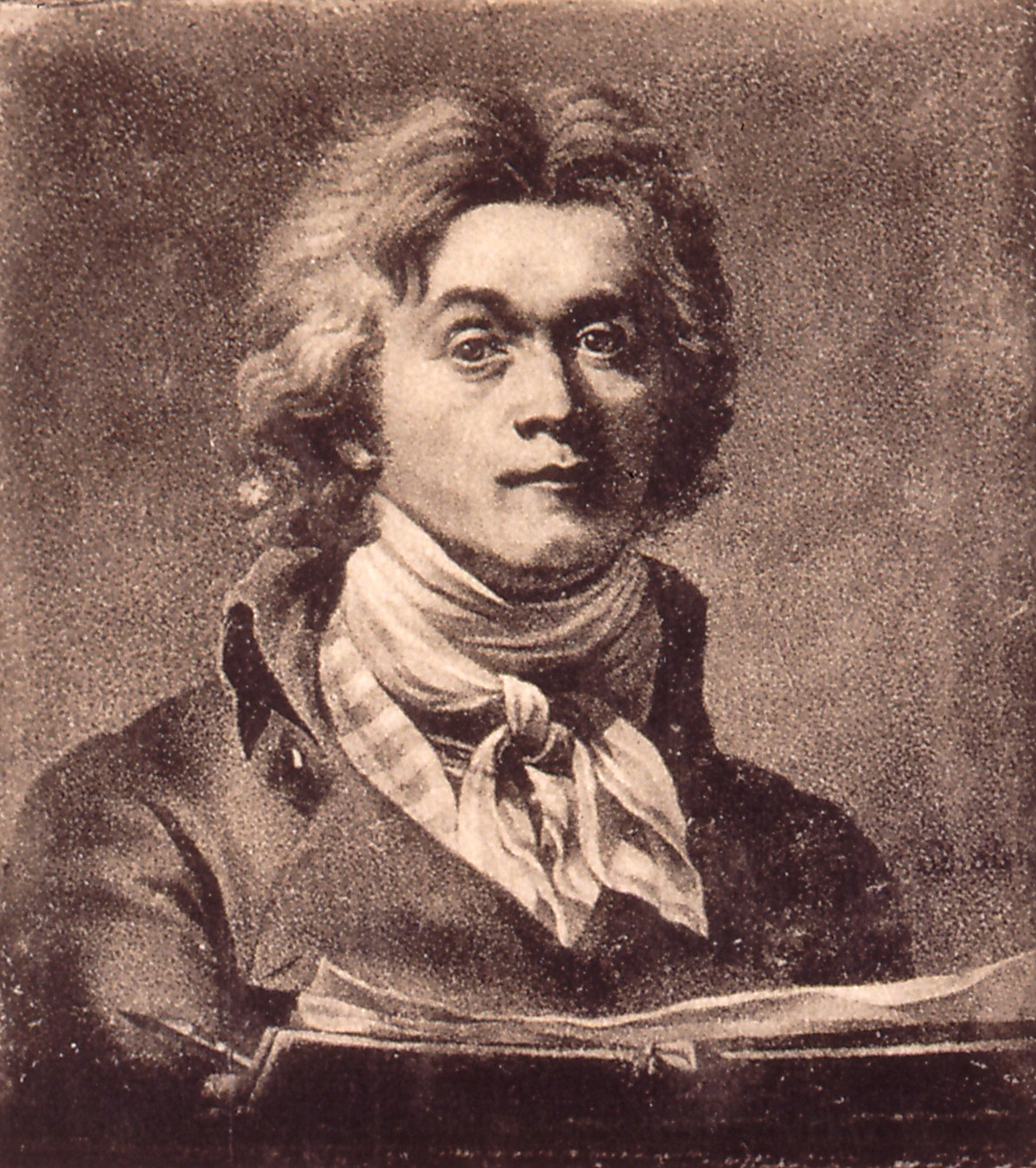
Guérin by an unknown artist

Christophe Guérin (French pronunciation: [kʁistɔf ɡeʁɛ̃]; 1758–1831) was a French engraver and painter. He is notable for his engravings and his reproductions of paintings by Raphael and Correggio.

== Life ==
Born in Strasbourg to the engraver Jean Guérin, he learned drawing and engraving in his father's studio before studying at the École nationale supérieure des beaux-arts in Paris. He returned to his birthplace in 1787 and engraved banknotes, as had his father. In 1803 he became head professor at the city's Galerie des peintures, a post he held until his death. He also took part in the foundation of a drawing school for the city and became its head.

== Selected works by museum ==
- Cambridge (United States), Fogg Art Museum :
  - The Archangel Leading the Young Tobias, after the top of the right panel from the Pavia Charterhouse Altarpiece by Perugino;
  - Love Disarmed, after Corregio;
  - Saint Benedict's Vision, after Eustache Le Sueur;
  - Adrien de Lezay-Marnésia;
  - Artemisia II, after Hendrik van Limborch;
  - Rest in the countryside, after Philippe-Jacques de Loutherbourg.
- Paris, Bibliothèque nationale de France :
  - Honoré-Gabriel Riqueti de Mirabeau, engraving by Lambertus Antonius Claessens after a drawing by Christophe Guérin;
  - Claude Florimond Esmangard, counsellor of state;
  - Jean Laurent Blessig.
- London, British Museum :
  - Portrait of Nicolas Luckner, marshal of France;
  - Crossing the Stream, after Philippe-Jacques de Loutherbourg;
  - Mary Magdalen Contemplating A Crucifix, after Correggio;
  - The Dance of the Muses, after Giulio Romano;
  - Nicolas François de Neufchâteau;
  - Christ Crowned With Thorns;
  - The Sibyl
  - Jean-Baptiste Treilhard, minister plenipotentiary to the Council of Rasdtadt.

== Gallery ==
Engravings by Christophe Guérin

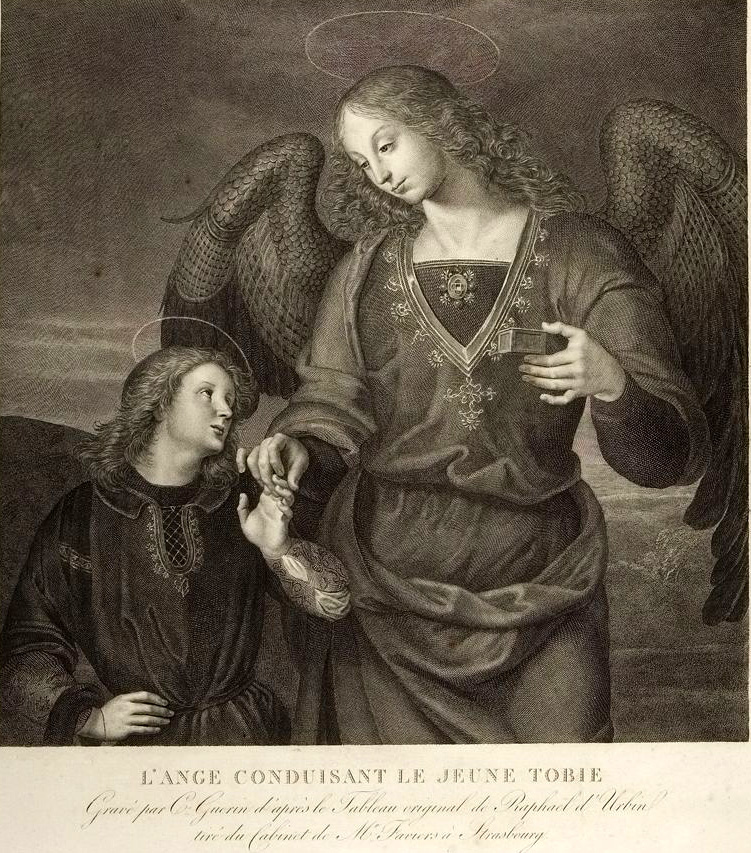
The Archangel Leading the Young Tobias, after Perugino

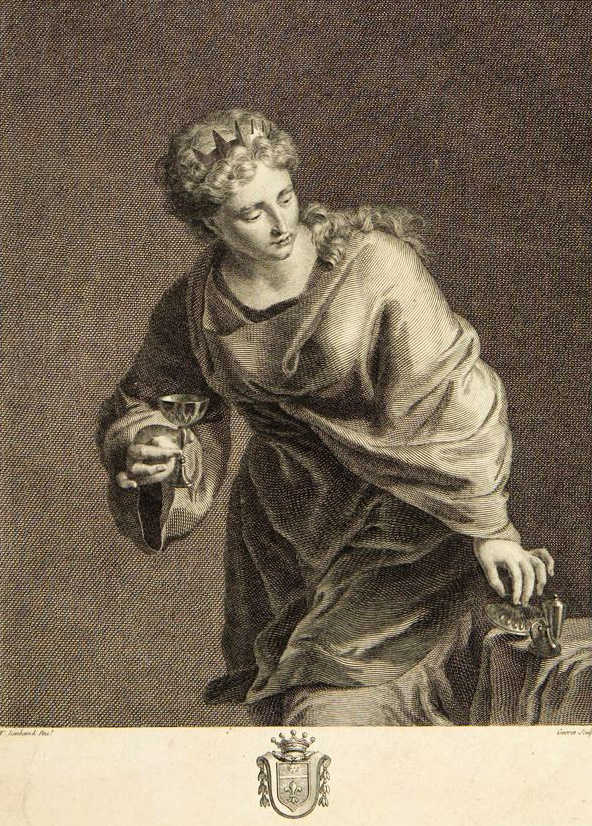
Artemisia II, after Hendrik van Limborch

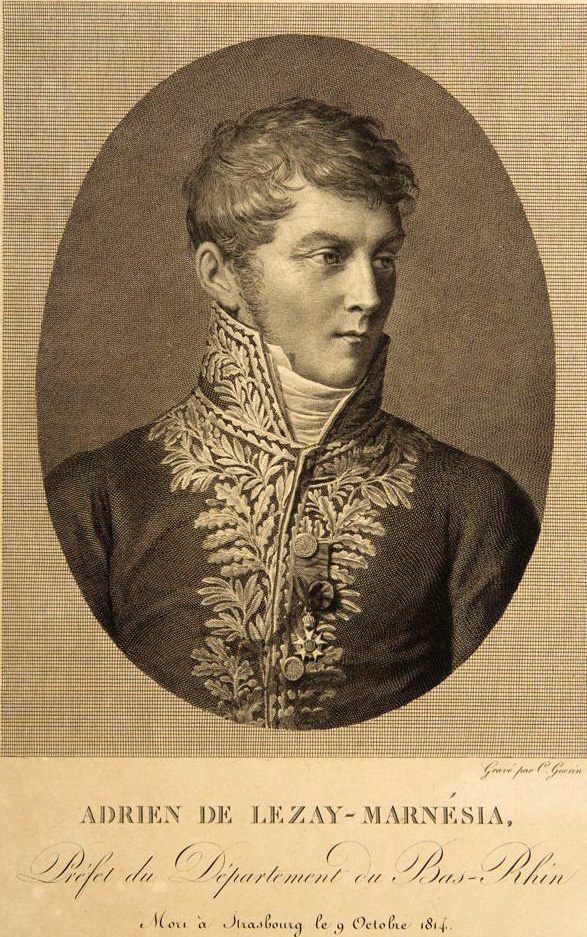
Adrien de Lezay-Marnésia

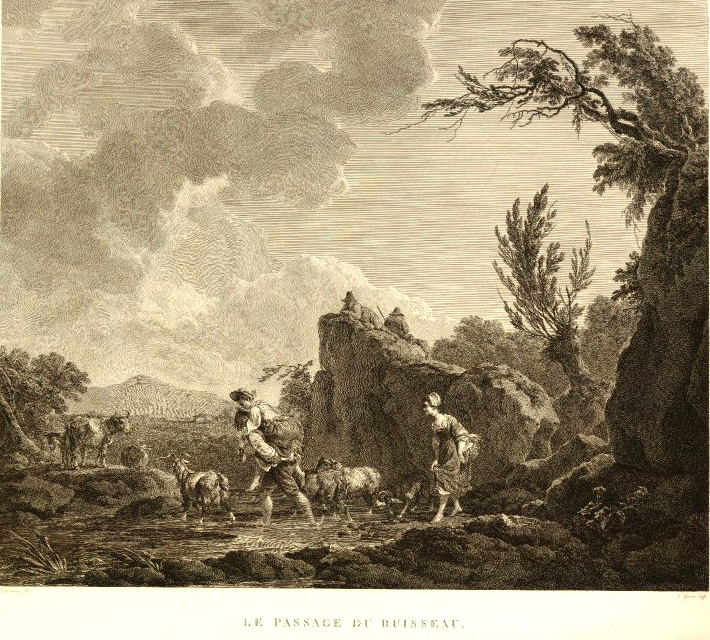
Crossing the Stream, after Philippe-Jacques de Loutherbourg
