= Philippe Grass =

French sculptor

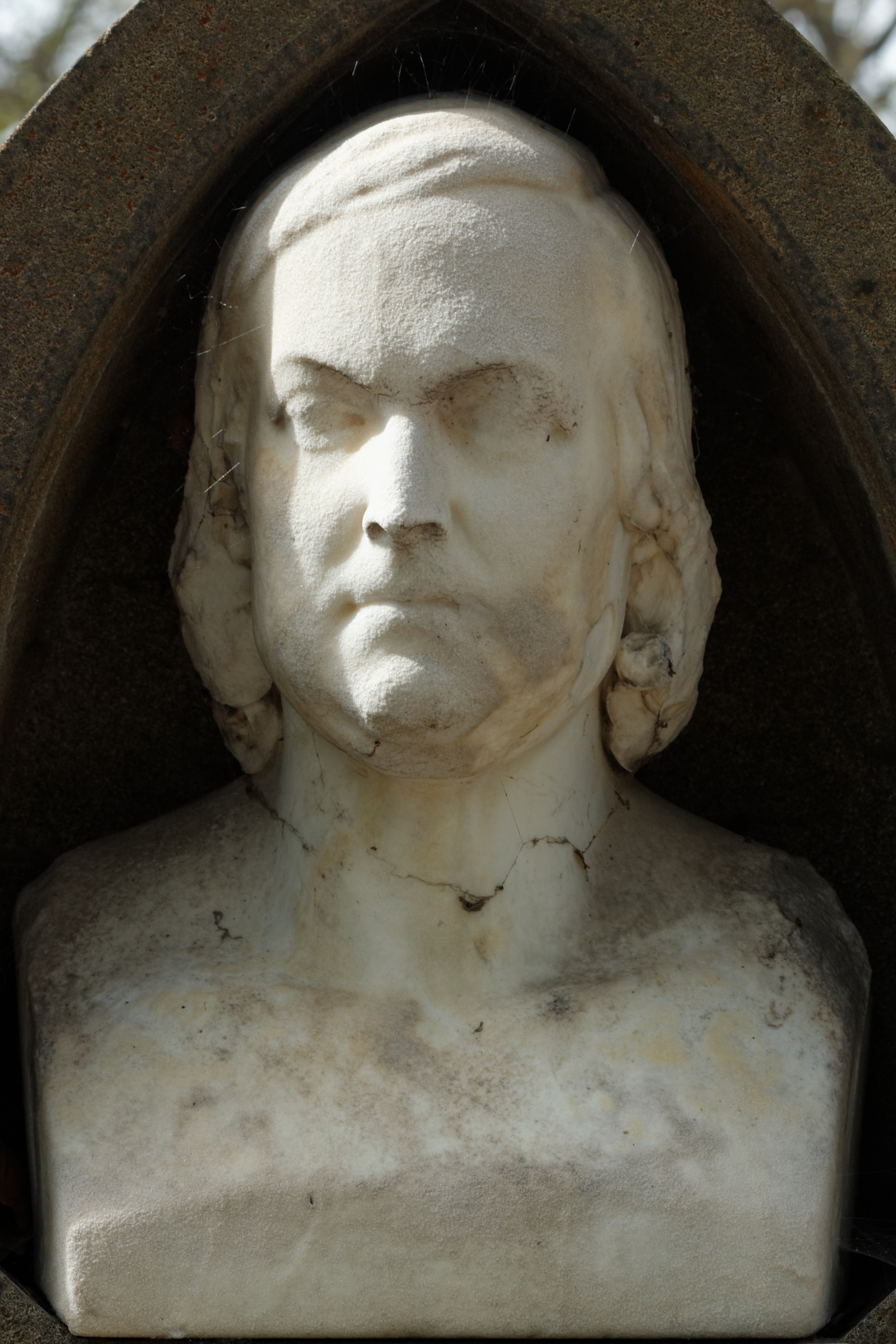
Tomb of Émile Souvestre, by Philippe Grass

Philippe Grass (6 May 1801 – 9 April 1876) was a French sculptor.

== Career ==
Born in Wolxheim, Alsace, Grass was a pupil of Landolin Ohmacht and Baron François Joseph Bosio. From 1820 to 1823, he studied at the École des Beaux-Arts de Paris. After his return to Alsace, he was appointed sculptor of the Fondation de l'Œuvre Notre-Dame in Strasbourg. In 1865, he became a knight of the Legion of Honour. He made the portrait of his friend Émile Souvestre on his tomb on the Père Lachaise Cemetery.

He died in Strasbourg.

== Selected works ==
- Statue du général Jean-Baptiste Kléber, bronze, 1840
- Statue du préfet Adrien de Lezay-Marnésia, 1845, in Strasbourg
- Jugement dernier, on the facade of the cathedral of Strasbourg
- Icare déployant ses ailes, 1831
- Suzanne au bain, 1834
- Jeune Paysanne, 1839
