= Johann Lorenz Blessig =

German theologian (1747–1816)

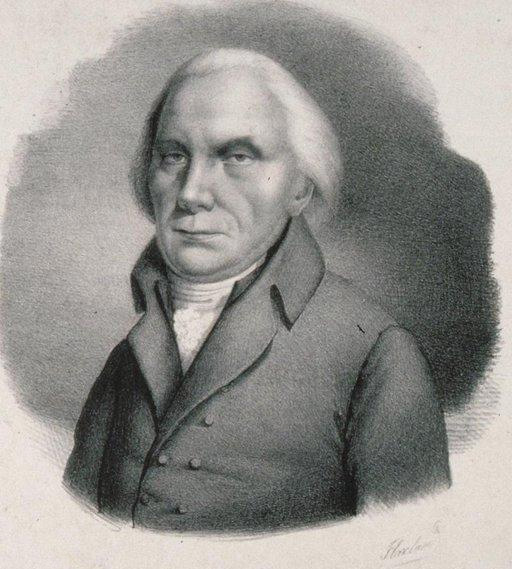
Blessig

Johann Lorenz Blessig or Jean Laurent Blessig or Johannes Laurentius Blessig (29 March 1747 – 17 February 1816) was a Lutheran pastor and theologian.

Blessig was born and died in Strasbourg.

== Works ==
- Johannes Laurentius Blessig: Origines philosophiæ apud Romanos. Lorenz, Straßburg 1770, Digitalisat. (Latin)
- Joh. Lorenz Blessig: Zur würdigen Andacht der Christen, besonders bey der Feyer des H. Abendmahls, Welchem beygefügt sind: Christliche Betrachtungen auf alle Tage des Monats, nach dem Französ. des Erzbischoffs Fenelon, Nebst Gebeten und Liedern. Treuttel, Straßburg 1784, Digitalisat.(de)
- Johann Lorenz Blessig: Zur praktischen Seelen-Lehre. Eine Vorlesung. Akademische Buchhandlung, Straßburg 1785, Digitalisat.(de)
- Johann Lorenz Blessig: Leben des Grafen Johann Friedrich von Medem nebst seinem Briefwechsel hauptsächlich mit der Frau Kammerherrinn von der Recke, seiner Schwester. 2 Bände. Akademische Buchhandlung, Straßburg 1792, Digitalisat Bd. 1, Digitalisat Bd. 2.(de)
- Johann Lorenz Blessig: Predigten bey dem Eintritt in das Neunzehnte Jahrhundert. König, Straßburg 1816, Digitalisat.(de)
- Johann Lorenz Blessig: Nachgelassene Predigten auf alle Sonn- und Festtage des Jahres. 2 Bände. Gleditsch u. a., Leipzig u. a. 1826.(de)
