= Certificate of aptitude for secondary school teachers (France) =

The Certificat d'aptitude au professorat de l'enseignement du second degré (lit. Certificate of aptitude for secondary school teachers, CAPES) is a professional diploma from the French Ministry of National Education, Higher Education and Research. It is awarded to candidates who, after passing the tests of a recruitment competition (external, internal or third competition), have been admitted to the professional qualification examination.

The CAPES constitutes, with the assistance of the agrégation, registration on the list of suitable candidates and secondment, one of the ways to obtain the title of a full qualified professor for secondary degree. Since 2010, certified teachers must simultaneously validate the CAPES exams and a master's degree. They are then trainee civil servants for one year (general rule applied to all civil servants).

The CAPES allows them to teach in both general and technological secondary schools (including BTS), as well as sometimes in universities (PRCE status). For the purposes of service, certified teachers may be asked to do part of their service in a vocational lycée. The certificate of aptitude for teaching at the secondary level in contract private schools (CAFEP) is the equivalent of the CAPES for teaching in contract private schools.

== History ==
CAPES was created in 1950 to recruit teachers for public general and technical secondary schools. It succeeds the certificate of aptitude for teaching in collèges (CAEC) created in 1941 (collèges then led to the baccalaureate, alongside state lycées).

At that time it concerned the following subjects:

- Plastic arts;
- Musical education and choral singing;
- Philosophy;
- Modern literature;
- Classics;
- History-geography;
- Modern languages (Arabic, Chinese, Dutch, English, Hebrew, German, Italian, Portuguese, Russian, Spanish);
- Mathematics;
- Physics and chemistry;
- Economic and social sciences;
- Life and earth sciences;
- Physical and sports education.

The CAPES of documentation was created in 1989 by Lionel Jospin, then Minister of National Education, for the recruitment of Teacher-librarian.

The CAPES Coordination Pédagogique et Ingénierie de la Formation was created in 2000 by Michel Sapin, Minister of Civil Service and State Reform (2000–2002) in the Lionel Jospin government.

=== 1991-2009 ===
From 1991 to 2009, the certificate was obtained in two years after the licence:

- At the end of the first year of IUFM, success in the external competition (open to holders of a bac+3 level diploma).
- A second year of IUFM, combining IUFM training (approximately two days per week) and "responsibility internship" in front of classes (from 4 h to 6 h of classes per week until June 2006, then from 6 h to 8 h of classes per week from the beginning of the 2006 school year).

An academic jury (chaired by the Rector) delivered the professional qualification examination, which fully validated the certificate of aptitude (CAPES) and allowed tenure in the corps of certified teachers.

=== Since 2010 ===
Candidates for the competition must now obtain a master's degree to validate their CAPES. The two courses are simultaneous. At the end of their year of training, the teacher therefore has at least a level of bac +5.

The CAPES in Classical Letters is abolished in 2013, and merged with the CAPES in Modern Letters to give the CAPES in Letters.

The Ministry of National Education announced in 2014 the creation of an IT option for the external CAPES and the CAFEP-CAPES in mathematics from the 2017 session of the competitive examination.

On the occasion of her visit to Japan, Najat Vallaud-Belkacem, Minister of National Education, announced in 2016 the creation of a CAPES in Japanese.

The CAPES in classical and modern literature are reinstated by an order published in the Journal Officiel de la République Française on 10 May 2018, although there are few changes in the tests.

== Competition ==
There is an internal competition, an external competition, and a third competition.

=== Conditions for taking the competition ===
In order to take the external competition, it is necessary to justify, as a minimum, a registration in the first year of a master's degree or a recognised equivalence.

The internal competition is open to civil servants, non-tenured teachers or educational assistants with at least three years' seniority in the civil service.

=== Sections ===
The competitions are organized in several sections

=== Tests ===
The contest is divided into two parts:

- The written tests, firstly, to select the "eligible" candidates, i.e. those allowed to take the oral tests.
- The oral tests, secondly, select the only candidates who are definitively admitted.

Each year the Minister of National Education, after receiving the assent of the Minister of the Civil Service, sets the number of posts put up for competition for each discipline. These numbers vary greatly from one discipline to another and may fluctuate from one year to the next. The juries in each discipline are sovereign and decide on the eligibility and admission bars. The juries are composed of general inspectors of national education, regional education academy inspectors, members of higher education teaching bodies and certified associate professors.

== Year of training and tenure ==
Successful candidates in the competition are appointed trainee civil servants and assigned for the duration of the traineeship in an académie by the Minister of Education. The traineeship lasts one year and alternates between work experience in an educational establishment and periods of training in a higher education establishment.

At the end of the traineeship, the rector of the academy in whose jurisdiction the traineeship is completed, on the proposal of the selection board, shall declare the traineeship tenable.

The certificate of aptitude for teaching in secondary education is awarded to candidates who have successfully passed the tests and completed the traineeship.

== Recruitment difficulties ==
=== 1970-2000: growing needs and increasing number of posts ===
The number of posts offered in the competition increased eightfold between 1970 and 2006. Despite the growing needs, the attractiveness of the profession makes it possible, with a few transitional measures, to fill all the posts necessary for the operation of the institution.
