= Certificat d'études primaires =

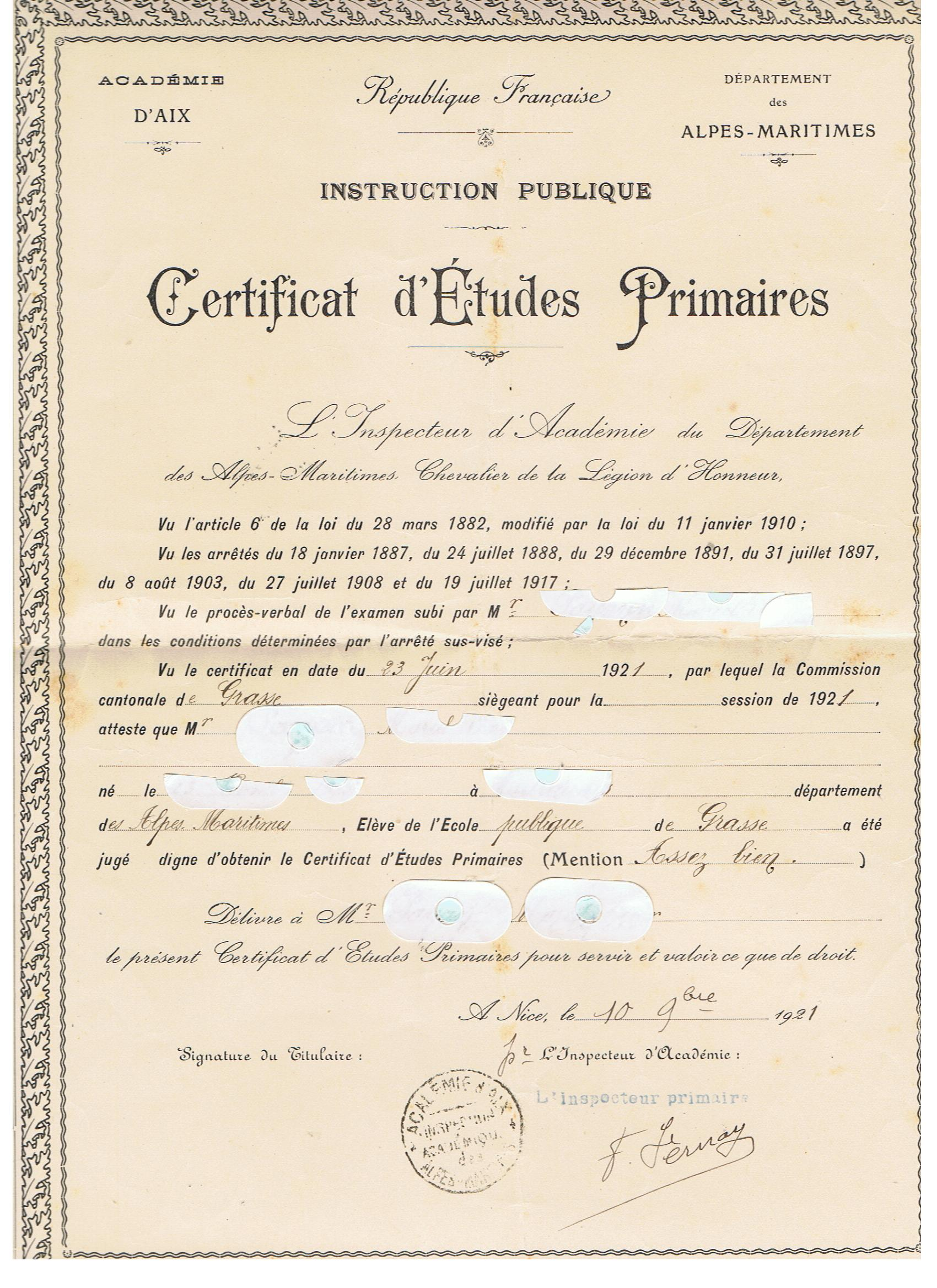
Certificat d'études primaires

The certificat d'études primaires (CEP) was a diploma awarded at the end of elementary primary education in France (from 11 to 13 years inclusive until 1936) and certifying that the student had acquired basic skills in writing, reading, mathematics, history, geography and applied sciences. It was officially discontinued in 1989.

The official name of the CEP was "Certificat d'études primaires élémentaires" (CEPE); it was colloquially known as the "certificat d'études" or "certif'".

== History ==
The certificat d'études primaires was created by a circulaire on August 20, 1866, under the influence of Victor Duruy.

On 1882, it was instituted by the Loi Jules Ferry on March 28, 1882, which also established mandatory primary education for children from 6 to 13 years old.

== See also ==
Primary School Leaving Examination
