= Hussard noir =

French nickname given to school teachers

The Hussard Noir (Black Hussars) was a nickname given to school teachers in the early 20th century in the French Third Republic. Coined by Charles Péguy to refer to student-teachers because of their long black coats the name also makes reference to the infamous hussars. Tasked in 1882 to teach after the enactment of the Jules Ferry laws which rendered school both mandatory and secular. Owing to the tradition of adding a suffix to the end of a Hussar regiment's title (such as the revolutionary wars' Hussars of Liberty) they would acquire their frightful name Black hussars of the republic and Black hussars of severity. These nicknames arose from the tensions of teaching their largely illiterate and catholic students republican and secular values as well the increasing their duty in boosting the militaristic spirits of their pupils preceding the Franco-Prussian War and irrenditism in its wake.
