= Adrien de Lezay-Marnésia =

French politician (1769–1814)

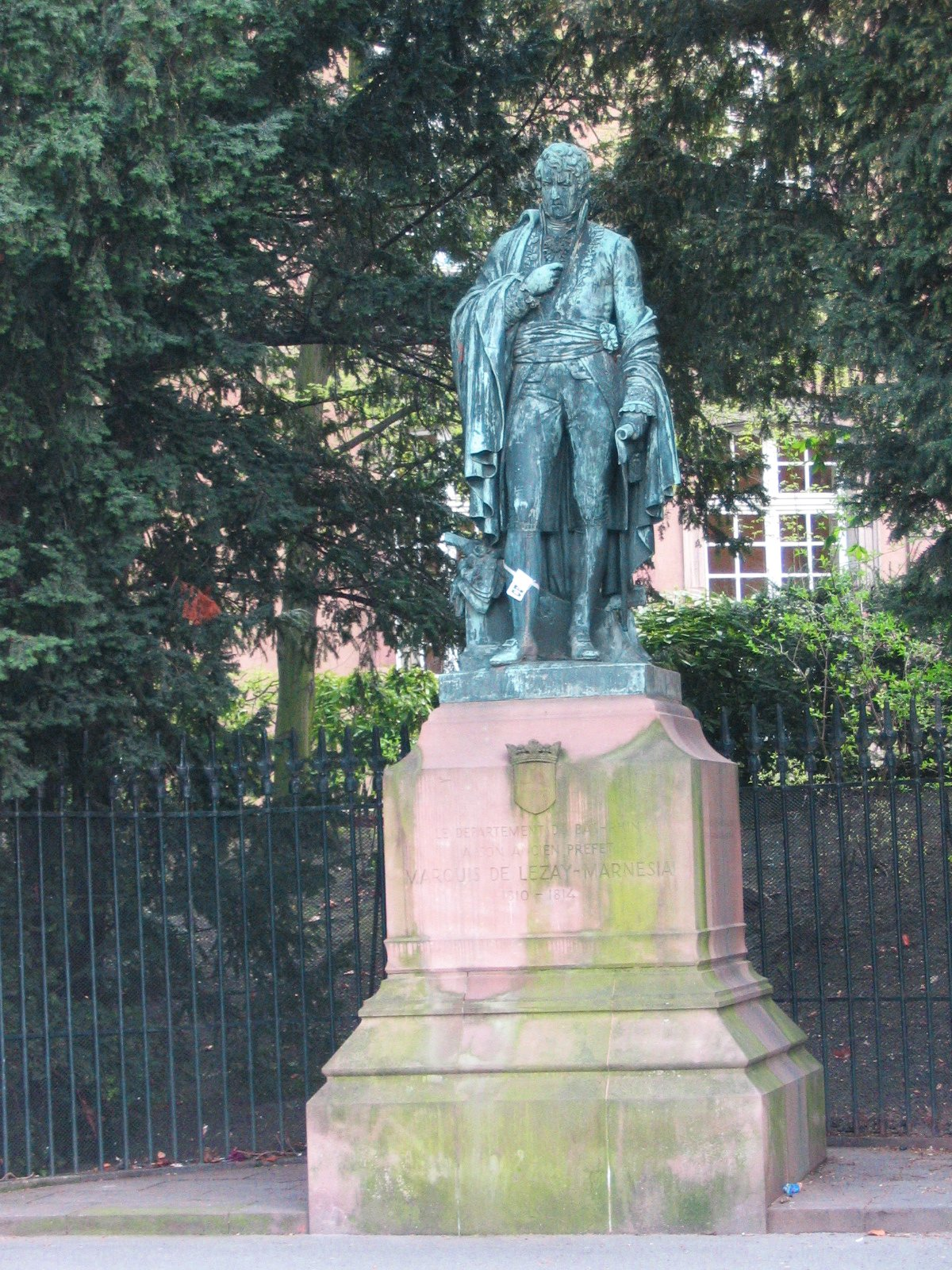
Statue of Prefect Lezay-Marnésia, by Philippe Grass

Baron Paul Adrien François Marie de Lezay-Marnésia (born August 9, 1769, in Moutonne, died on 9 October 1814, in Haguenau) was a French prefect.

He was the son of Claude-François de Lezay-Marnésia (1739-1800) and Françoise de Briqueville; his parents met in Forges-les-Eaux, in Normandy, and had roots in Spain.

When his father and younger brother went to the United States in 1790, Lezay-Marnésia stayed in Franche-Comté with his mother. In December 1791, he left to study diplomacy at the University of Groningen; he met his father and brother in Paris in August 1792 and settled with them in the family château in Saint-Julien.

Under the Directoire, he was forced to flee to Switzerland and returned to France on 17 May 1801. Napoleon I of France gave him a diplomatic mission to Hungary in 1803.

He was prefect of the département Rhin-et-Moselle 1806–1810 in Koblenz.

Appointed as prefect of the département Bas-Rhin on 12 February 1810, he organized the receipt of the Archduchess Marie Louise, Duchess of Parma, wife of Napoleon, in March in Strasbourg. Thereafter, its director was focused on improving living conditions in rural areas.
