= Institut Universitaire de Formation des Maîtres =

The Institut Universitaire de Formation des Maîtres (IUFM; English: University Institute for Teachers Training) was an institution in each French teaching Academy (one for each region) which specialised in the training of primary and secondary teachers.

IUFMs were created in 1990, replacing the Normal school. Detractors object to the IUFM practice of using primary school training methods for secondary school training. Other criticism has focused on ideological concerns. Although there is considerable variety of approach between the different establishments, candidates should be aware of ideological factors when applying.
