= Hussar =

Type of light cavalry originating in Central Europe

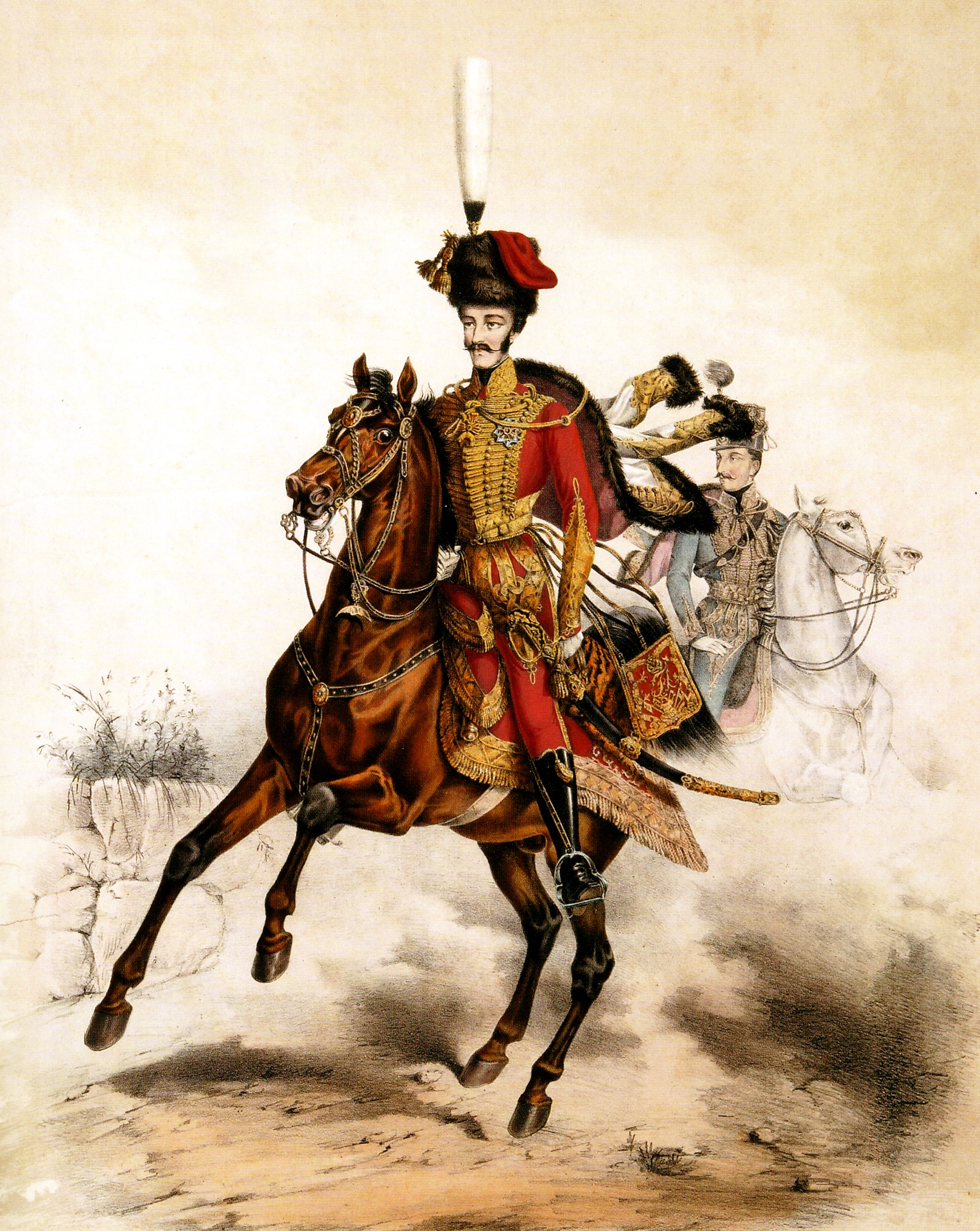
Illustration of Archduke Stephen of Austria as a hussar

A hussar (Note: /həˈzɑːr/ hə-ZAR or /hʊˈzɑːr/ huuz-AR, occasionally /həˈsɑːr/ hə-SAR; Hungarian: huszár [ˈhusaːr]; Croatian and Serbian: husar, хусар, IPA: [xûsaːr]; German: Husar [huˈzaːɐ̯]; Polish: husarz [ˈxusaʂ]; Swedish: husar [hɵˈsɑːr]; Dutch: huzaar [ɦyˈzaːr].) was a member of a class of light cavalry, originally from the Kingdom of Hungary during the 15th and 16th centuries. The title and distinctive dress of these horsemen were subsequently widely adopted by light cavalry regiments in European armies during the late 17th and 18th centuries. By the 19th century, hussars were wearing jackets decorated with braid plus shako or busby fur hats and had developed a romanticized image of being dashing and adventurous.

Several modern armies retain the designation of hussars for armored (tank) units. In addition, a number of mounted units survive which wear historical hussar uniforms on parade or while providing ceremonial escorts.

== Etymology ==
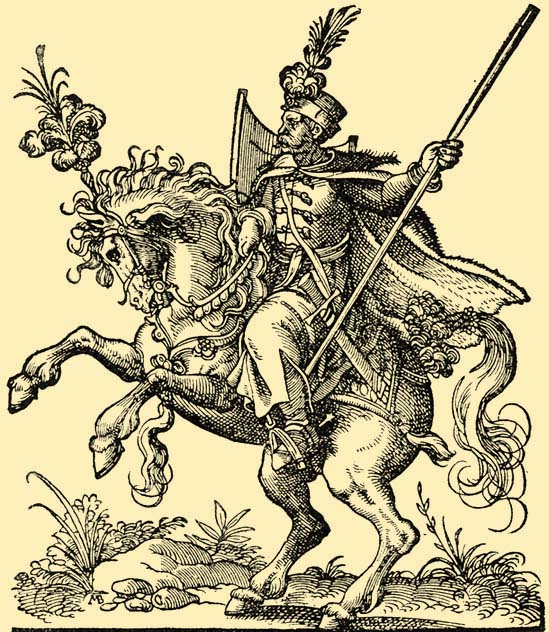
16th-century woodcut of a Hungarian hussar by Jost Amman

Etymologists are divided over the derivation of the word hussar. The term came into use in relation to the cavalry of late medieval Hungary, popularized under Matthias Corvinus, made up of Serb warriors. The first written use of the word hussarones (in Latin, plural; in Hungarian: huszár) is found in documents dating from 1432 in southern Hungary (at the time an area of the Kingdom of Hungary bordering the Ottoman Empire). Two main theories exist:

- The word hussar stems from Hungarian huszár which in turn originates from the medieval Serbian husar (Cyrillic: хусар, or gusar, Cyrillic: гусар), meaning brigand (because early hussars' shock troops tactics used against the Ottoman army resembled that of brigands; in modern Serbian the meaning of gusar is limited to sea pirate), from the Medieval Latin cursarius (cf. the English word corsair). Byzantinist scholars argue that the term originated in Roman military practice, and the cursarii (singular cursarius). 10th-century Byzantine military manuals mention chonsarioi, light cavalry, recruited in the Balkans, especially Serbs, "ideal for scouting and raiding". This word was subsequently reintroduced to Western European military practice after its original usage had been lost with the collapse of Rome in the west.
- Another theory is that the term is an original Hungarian one. A further premise notes that húsz means 'twenty' in Hungarian whilst ár is a unit of land measurement or acre. Accordingly, it is suggested that hussars are so named as they were a form of military levy introduced after 1458 whereby any landowner with twenty acres was duty bound to provide a mounted and equipped (peasant origin) soldier to the king's army at his own expense.

== Origins ==
=== Early Hungarian hussars ===
The hussars reportedly originated in bands of Serb warriors, crossing into southern Hungary after the Ottoman conquest of Serbia in the late 14th century. Regent-Governor John Hunyadi created mounted units inspired by the Ottomans. His son, Matthias Corvinus, later king of Hungary, is claimed to be the creator of these troops, commonly called Rác (a Hungarian exonym for Serbs). Initially, they fought in small bands, but were reorganised into larger, trained formations during the reign of King Matthias Corvinus.

The medieval Hungarian written sources spoke disparagingly and contemptuously of the light cavalry and the hussars in general, and during battles the texts praised only the virtues, endurance, courage, training and achievements of the knights, since during the Middle Ages the Hungarian noble origin soldiers served exclusively as heavy armoured cavalry.

The first hussar regiments comprised the light cavalry of the Black Army of Hungary. Under Corvinus's command, the hussars took part in the war against the Ottoman Empire in 1485 and proved successful against the sipahis (Ottoman cavalry) as well as against the Bohemians and Poles. After the king's death, in 1490, hussars became the standard form of cavalry in Hungary in addition to the heavy cavalry. Their role was limited to irregular warfare, raiding, securing, covering and reconnaissance of main regular forces. According to Antonio Bonfini, this lightly armed cavalry (expeditissimus equitatus) was not allowed to be part of the regular army, when the order of the battle was formed, but was placed outside it in quite separate groups and used to destroy, burn, kill and instill fear in the civilian population, while they rode ahead of the regular army.

The 16th and 17th centuries saw a major change and during the Thirty Years' War they fought as light cavalry and increasingly used firearms, instead of more traditional weapons such as bows and spears. The Habsburg emperors hired Hungarian hussars as mercenaries to serve against the Ottomans and on various battlefields throughout Western Europe.

Early hussars wore armor when they could afford it, as did the later Polish hussars. Hungarian hussars abandoned the use of shields and, at a later date, armor; becoming entirely light cavalry in the first half of the 17th century.

=== Polish hussars ===
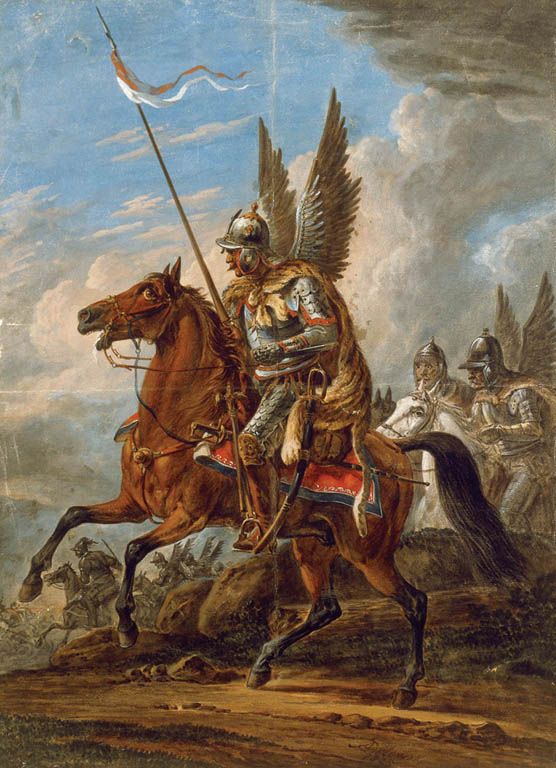
Painting of the Polish hussars by Aleksander Orłowski

Initially the first units of Polish Hussars in the Kingdom of Poland were formed around 1500.

The Polish heavy hussars of the Polish–Lithuanian Commonwealth were far more manoeuvrable than the heavily armoured lancers previously employed. The hussars proved vital to the Polish–Lithuanian victories at the Orsza (1514), the Obertyn (1531) and the Battle of Vienna (1683).

Over the course of the 16th century, hussars in Transylvania and Hungary became heavier in character: they had abandoned wooden shields and adopted plate-metal body armour. When Stephen Báthory, a Transylvanian-Hungarian prince, was elected King of Poland in 1576, he reorganised the Polish–Lithuanian Hussars of his Royal Guard along Hungarian lines, making them a heavy formation, equipped with a long lance as their main weapon. Under his reign, the hussars replaced medieval-style lancers in the Polish–Lithuanian army, and they formed the bulk of the Polish cavalry. By the 1590s, most Polish–Lithuanian hussar units had been reformed along the same "heavy", Hungarian model. Due to the same resemblance, the Polish heavy hussars came with their own style, the Polish winged hussars or Polish–Lithuanian Commonwealth winged husaria.

In the Battle of Lubieszów, in 1577, the "Golden Age" of the husaria began. Up to and including the Battle of Vienna in 1683, the Polish–Lithuanian hussars fought countless actions against a variety of enemies. In the battles of Byczyna (1588), Kokenhusen (1601), Kircholm (1605), Kłuszyn (1610), Trzciana (1629), Chocim (1673) and Lwów (1675), the Polish–Lithuanian hussars proved to be the decisive factor, often against overwhelming odds.

Until the 18th century, they were considered the elite of the Commonwealth's armed forces.

=== Croatian hussars ===
Croatian hussar units, often designated simply as "Croats", were raised from the Kingdom of Hungary Military Frontier, Croatian-Slavonian and the Kingdom of Dalmatia, Croatia and Slavonia. One notable captain and chief officer of hussars was Petar Keglević. In 1578, Charles II took command of the Croatian and Slavonian Military Frontier and prepared written orders and rule of service for infantry (haramije) and cavalry (hussars), using the Serbo-Croatian language. The oldest written trace of the surname Husar in Croatia is from 1507 in Vinica where Petrus Hwzar (Petar Husar) was mentioned, and the next mentions are in a Regestum document dated 1598 of Blasius Hwszar at Lobor ("Castrum Lobor ... dominorum Joannis et Petri Keglyewich ... Blasius Hwszar") and in 1613 from Krapina ("desertum Joannes Huszar").

Croatian hussars were irregular light horsemen characteristic of the Habsburg-Ottoman border area. Croatian units were not inevitably referred as "Croats" but it was the most commonly used name. In the Thirty Years' War other designations used were "Wallachen, Zigeuner, Türken, Uskocken, Raitzen, Granitscharen, Insulaner, Wenden, Polen". Amongst the Croatian hussars could be found other ethno-political groups, such as Hungarians, Serbs, Albanians, Romanians, Poles, Vlachs and Cossacks. Croatian hussars participated in the siege of Magdeburg which was led by Johann Tserclaes as well as the sieges of Heidelberg, Frankenthal, Manheim, Breitenfeld, Lützen, Nördlingen, Wittstock and Breitenfeld.

Between 1746 and 1750, four Grenzer Hussar regiments were established: the Karlovac, Varaždin, Slavonian and Syrmia regiments. The Croatian-Slavonian Grenzer Hussars took part in the campaigns of 1793–94 against Revolutionary France In 1751, Maria Theresa prescribed a distinctive hussar uniform.

== History ==
=== 18th century European hussar formations ===
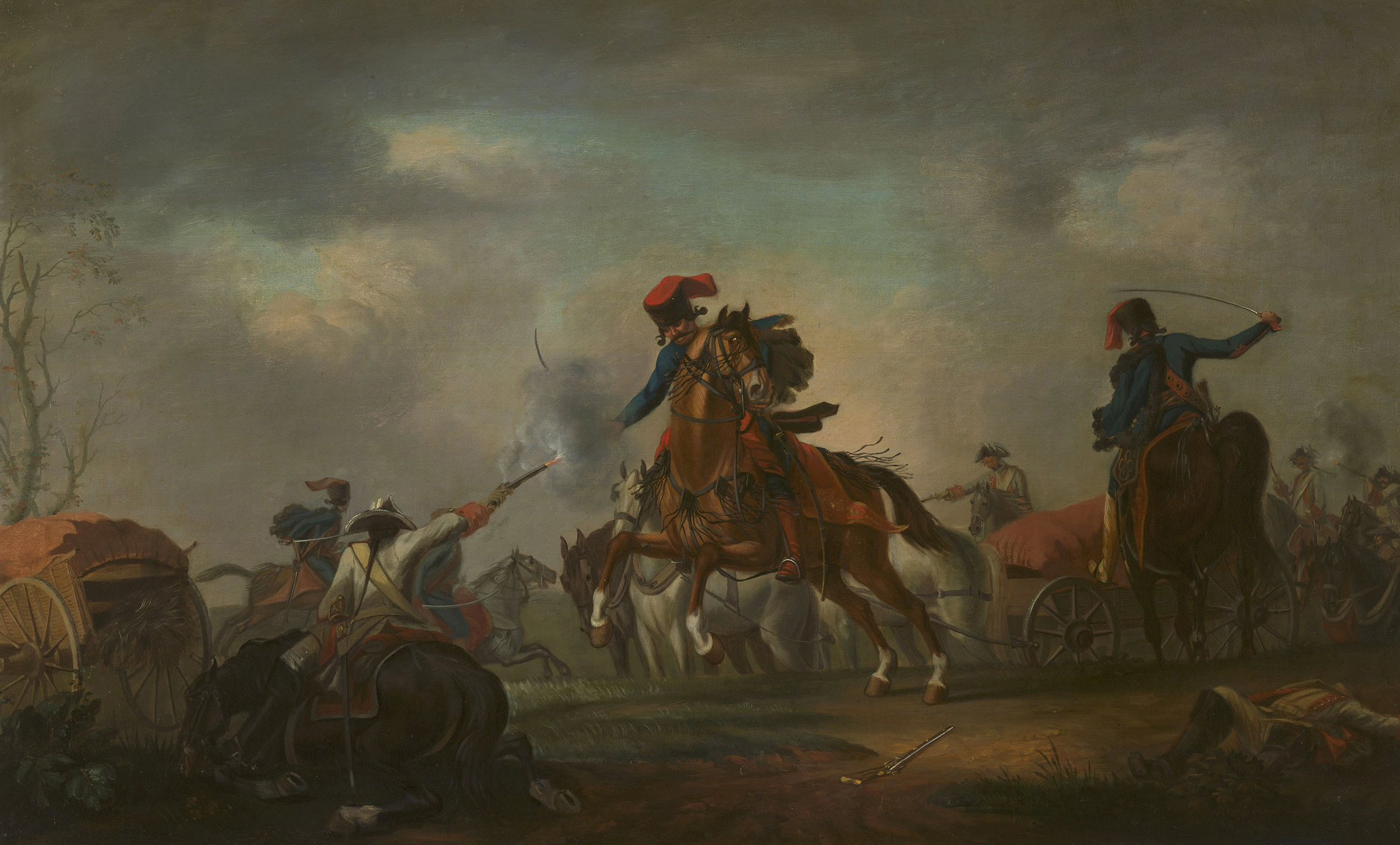
c. 1755 painting of hussars attacking a wagon train

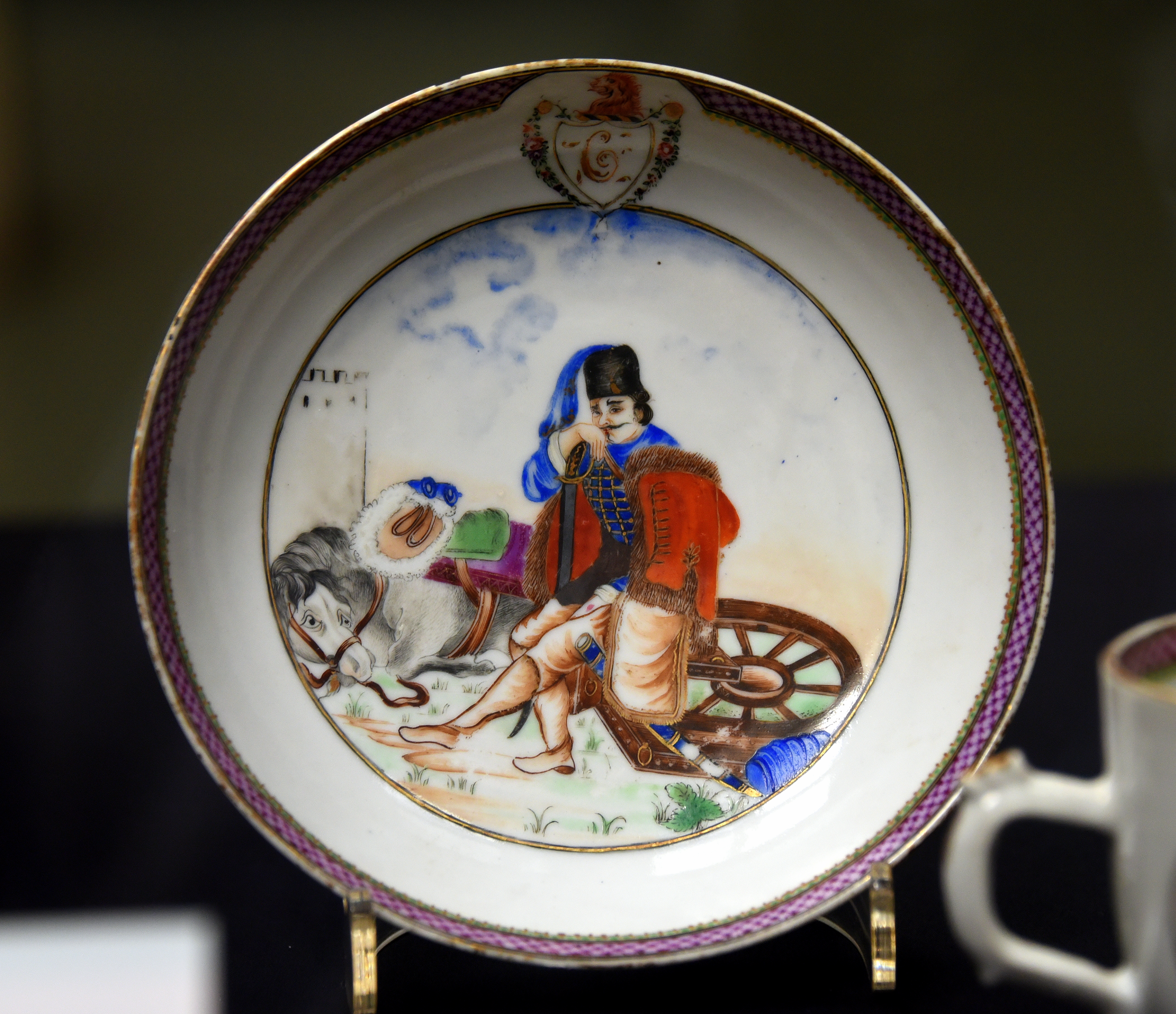
Saucer made in Jingdezhen between c. 1780–1790 depicting a wounded hussar

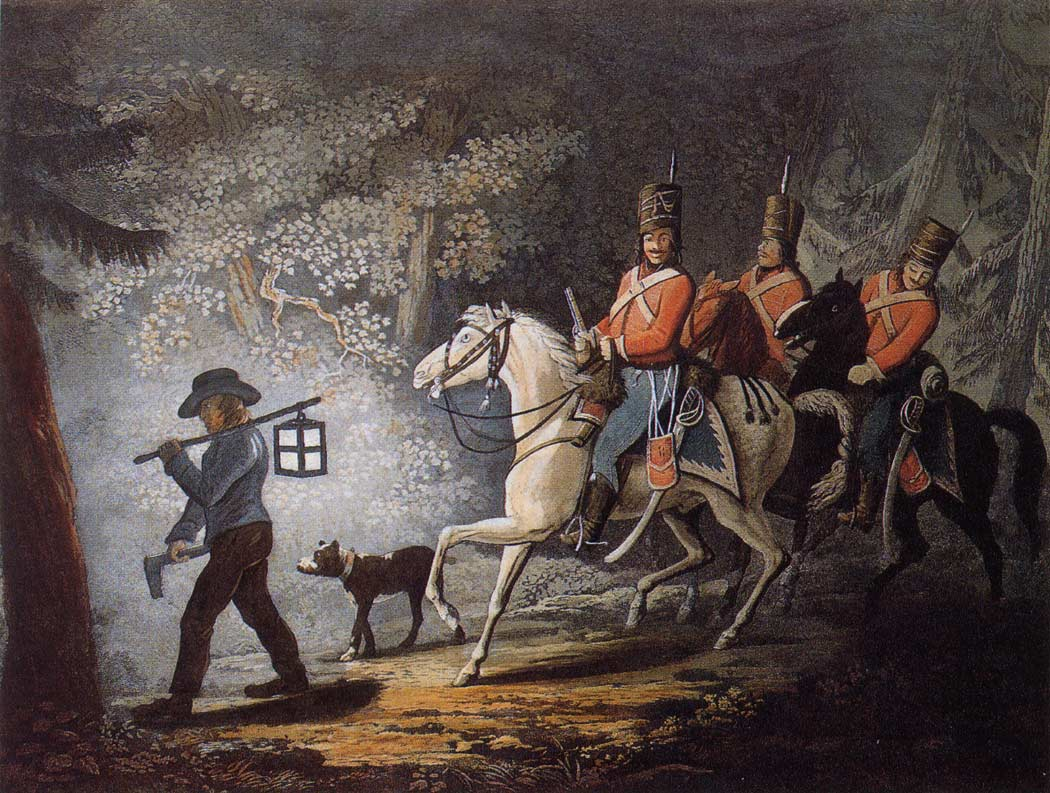
Hessian hussars in North America during the American Revolutionary War

Hussars throughout Europe followed a different line of development than the Polish hussars. During the early decades of the 17th century, hussars in Hungary ceased to wear metal body armour; and, by 1640, most were light cavalry. It was hussars of this "light" pattern, rather than the Polish heavy hussar, that were later copied across Europe. These light hussars were ideal for reconnaissance and raiding sources of fodder and provisions in advance of the army.

In battle, they were used in such light cavalry roles as harassing enemy skirmishers, overrunning artillery positions, and pursuing fleeing troops. In many countries, the hussars and bosniaks actually retained their original Asiatic uniforms. In the late 17th and 18th centuries, many Hungarian hussars sought employment in other Central and Western European countries and became the core of similar light cavalry formations created there. Following their example, hussar regiments were introduced into at least twelve European armies by 1800.

Bavaria raised its first hussar regiment in 1688 and a second one in about 1700. Prussia followed suit in 1721 when Frederick the Great used hussar units extensively during the War of the Austrian Succession.

France established a number of hussar regiments from 1692 onward, recruiting originally from Hungary and Germany, then subsequently from German-speaking frontier regions within France itself. The first hussar regiment in the French army was the Hussars-Royaux (Royal Hussars), raised from Hungarian deserters in 1692.

Spain disbanded its first hussars in 1747 and then raised new units of húsares in 1795. The Húsares de Pavía were created in 1684 by the Count of Melgar to serve in Spanish possessions in Italy and were named after the 1525 Spanish victory over the French army at Pavia, south of Milan, Italy. During the battle, the King of France, Francis I, was captured by the Spanish cavalry. The Húsares de Pavía fought in Italy during the Nine Years' War (1692–1695) and the War of Spanish Succession. It was transferred back to Spain. In 1719, the regiment was sent again to Italy until 1746.

Then, it served in campaigns against Algerian pirates and in the sieges of Oran and Algiers. During the Spanish War of Independence against Napoleon (1808–1814), the unit fought the Battles of Bailén, Tudela, Velez, Talavera and Ocaña and the actions of Baza, Cuellar, Murviedro and Alaquàs.

The Húsares de Pavía regiment also was involved in the Ten Years' War in Cuba, the Spanish–American War (1898), the Spanish Civil War (1936–1939), and in the Ifni War (1958). Ifni was a Spanish colony in North Africa that was attacked by irregulars from Morocco. As of 2010, this regiment is named Regimiento Acorazado de Caballería Pavía nr 4 (Cavalry armored regiment Pavia No. 4) and is garrisoned in Zaragoza (Spain).

Sweden had hussars from about 1756, and Denmark introduced this class of cavalry in 1762. Britain converted a number of light dragoon regiments to hussars in the early 19th century.

The Dutch Republic took a Bavarian regiment into service in 1745 (Regiment Frangipani). Several new regiments and corps were raised in 1747 and 1748, but eventually these existed only on paper. One regiment, the Statenhuzaren ('States' Hussars') remained, but was disbanded in 1752. In 1784, two free companies of hussars were raised, which were taken into service after 1787 and later became two full regiments. These were united into one regiment in 1795, which was the 2nd Regiment of the Kingdom of Holland in 1806, with a 3rd Hussars being raised that same year, as well as the Guard Hussars Regiment. The Guard Hussars became the 2^{e} régiment de chevau-légers lanciers de la Garde Impériale (the Red Lancers) after 1810; the 3rd was disbanded; the 2nd being incorporated into the French line as the 11^{e} Régiment.

After regaining independence, the new Royal Netherlands Army raised two hussar regiments (Nos. 6 and 8). They were disbanded (No. 8 in 1830), or converted to lancers (No. 6 in 1841). In 1867, all remaining cavalry regiments were transferred to hussar regiments. This tradition remains to this day, with the last surviving hussar regiment (Boreel's, 103rd and 104th reconnaissance squadrons) carrying on the tradition of all Dutch cavalry predecessors.

==== Russian Empire formation of hussar regiments ====
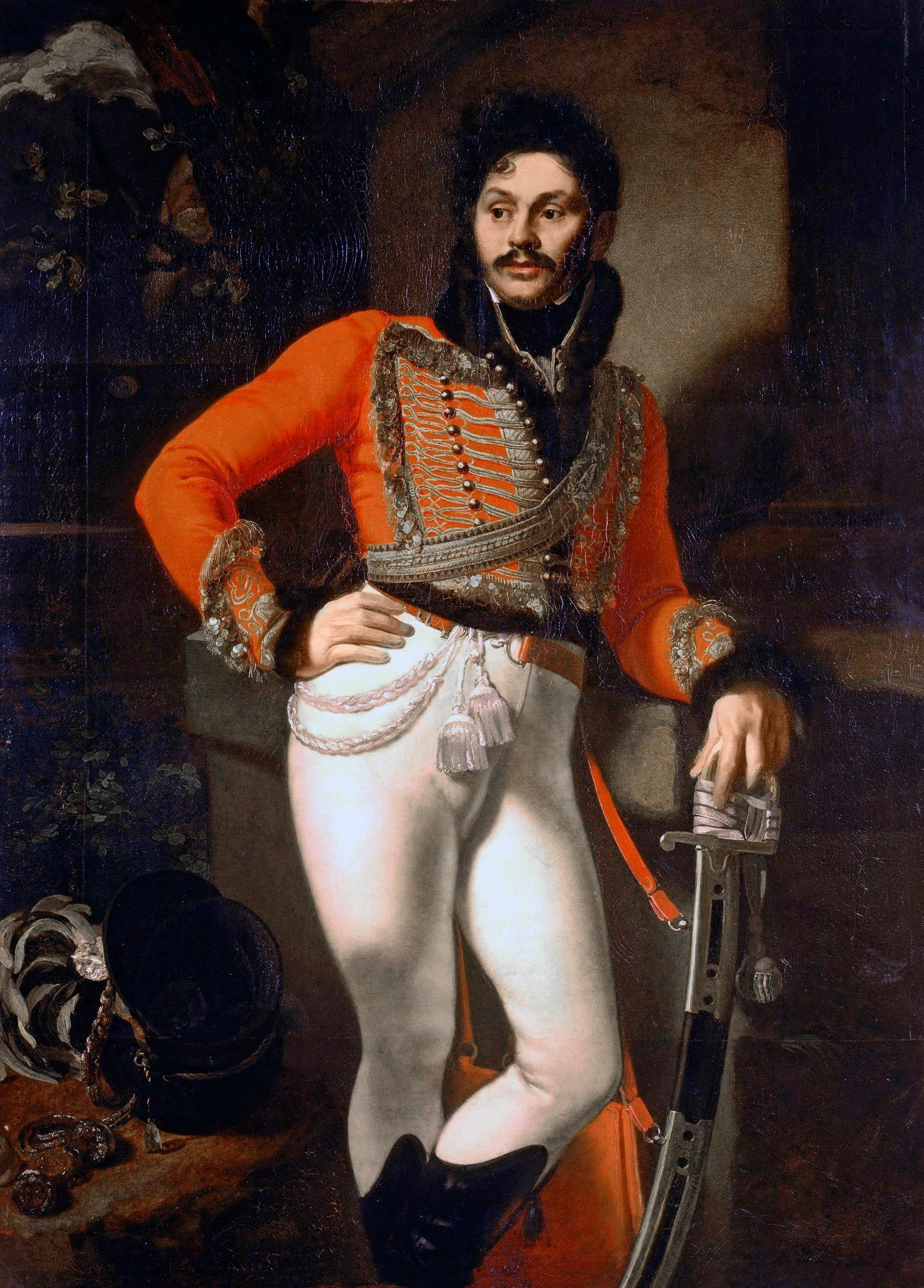
Portrait of Evgraf Davydov as a hussar

Russia relied on its native cossacks along with kalmyks and other nomads to provide irregular light cavalry until the mid-18th century. In 1707, Apostol Kigetsch, a Wallachian nobleman serving Russian Emperor Peter the Great, was given the task to form a khorugv ("banner" or "squadron") of 300 men to serve on the Ottoman-Russian border. The squadron consisted of Christians from Hungary, Serbia, Moldavia, and Wallachia. In 1711, prior to the Pruth campaign, 6 regiments (4 khorugv's each) of hussars were formed, mainly from Wallachia. Two other khorugv, for guerilla warfare, were formed, one Polish and one Serbian, to battle the Ottomans. In 1723, Peter the Great formed a Hussar regiment exclusively from Serbian light cavalry serving in the Austrian army. On 14 October 1741, during the regency of Grand Duchess Anna Leopoldovna, four Hussar regiments, a Serbian (Serbskiy), a Moldavian (Moldavskiy), a Hungarian (Vengerskiy) and a Georgian (Gruzinskiy) were authorized.

After the Russo-Turkish War (1735–39), these Hussar regiments were converted to regular service, voluntarily enlisted and not conscripted as the rest of the Russian army. They were on a level between regular and irregular cavalry. Hussars were recruited only from the nation indicated by the regiment's name, i.e., these regiments were national units in Russian service; all troops (including officers) were national, and commands were given in the respective languages. Each regiment was supposed to have a fixed organization of 10 companies, each of about 100 men, but these regiments were recruited from different sources, so they were less than the indicated strength.

By 1741, the foreign hussars in Russian service had disbanded and reliance for light cavalry functions was again placed on the indigenous Cossack irregulars. In that year new hussar regiments were raised, now drawn from Orthodox Christian communities along the Turkish frontier. The newly raised Russian hussar units had increased to 12 regiments by the Seven Years' War. During the 1750s Serbian and Slovak Orthodox communities and refugees, plus Poles and Hungarians, provided non-Russian recruits for the expanding hussars who evolved into a semi-regular corps of frontier light horse. In 1759–60, three more Hussar regiments, were raised, the Yellow (Želtiy), the Macedonian (Makedonskiy) and the Bulgarian (Bolgarskiy).

==== Hussars of Prussia's Frederick the Great ====
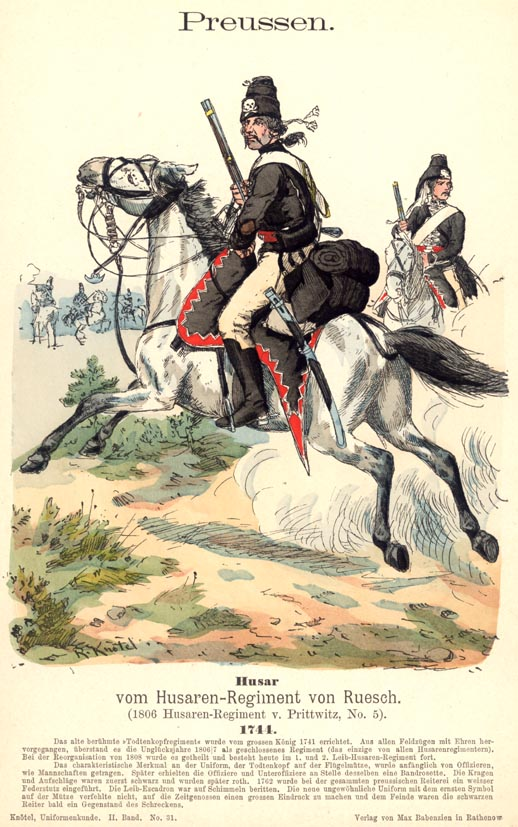
Illustration of a Prussian hussar in 1744

During and after Rákóczi's War of Independence, many Hungarians served in the Habsburg army. Located in garrisons far away from Hungary, some deserted from the Austrian army and joined that of Prussia. The value of the Hungarian hussars as light cavalry was recognised and, in 1721, two Hussaren Corps were organised in the Prussian Army.

Frederick II (later called "The Great") recognised the value of hussars as light cavalry and encouraged their recruitment. In 1741, he established a further five regiments, largely from Polish deserters. Three more regiments were raised for Prussian service in 1744 and another in 1758. While the hussars were increasingly drawn from Prussian and other German cavalrymen, they continued to wear the traditional Hungarian uniform, richly decorated with braid and gold trim.

Possibly due to a daring and impudent surprise raid on his capital, Berlin, by the hussars of Hungarian general András Hadik, Frederick also recognised the national characteristics of his Hungarian recruits and, in 1759, issued a royal order which warned the Prussian officers never to offend the self-esteem of his hussars with insults and abuse. At the same time, he exempted the hussars from the usual disciplinary measures of the Prussian Army, such as physical punishments including cudgeling.

Frederick used his hussars for reconnaissance duties and for surprise attacks against the enemy's flanks and rear. A hussar regiment under the command of Colonel Sigismund Dabasi-Halász helped win the Battle of Hohenfriedberg at Striegau on May 4, 1745, by attacking the Austrian combat formation on its flank and capturing all of its artillery.

The effectiveness of the hussars in Frederick's army can be judged by the number of promotions and decorations awarded to their officers. Recipients included the Hungarian generals Pal Werner and Ferenc Kőszeghy, who received the highest Prussian military order, the "Pour le Mérite"; General Tivadar Ruesh was awarded the title of baron; Mihály Székely was promoted from the rank of captain to general after less than fifteen years of service.

While Hungarian hussars served in the opposing armies of Frederick and Maria Theresa, there were no known instances of fratricidal clashes between them.

=== 19th century: hussar deployment worldwide ===
==== The Revolutionary and Napoleonic Wars ====
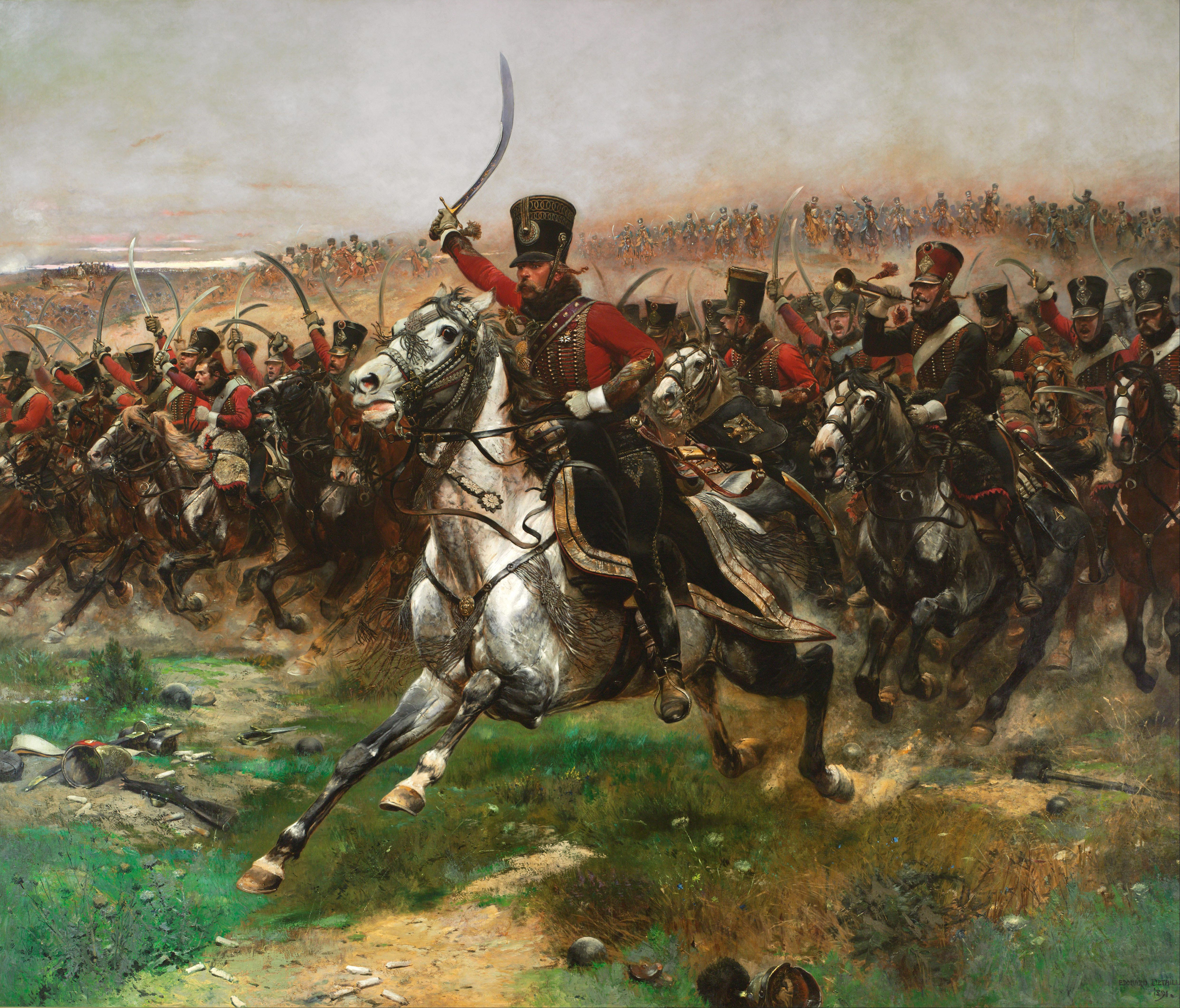
The French 4th Hussar Regiment at the Battle of Friedland

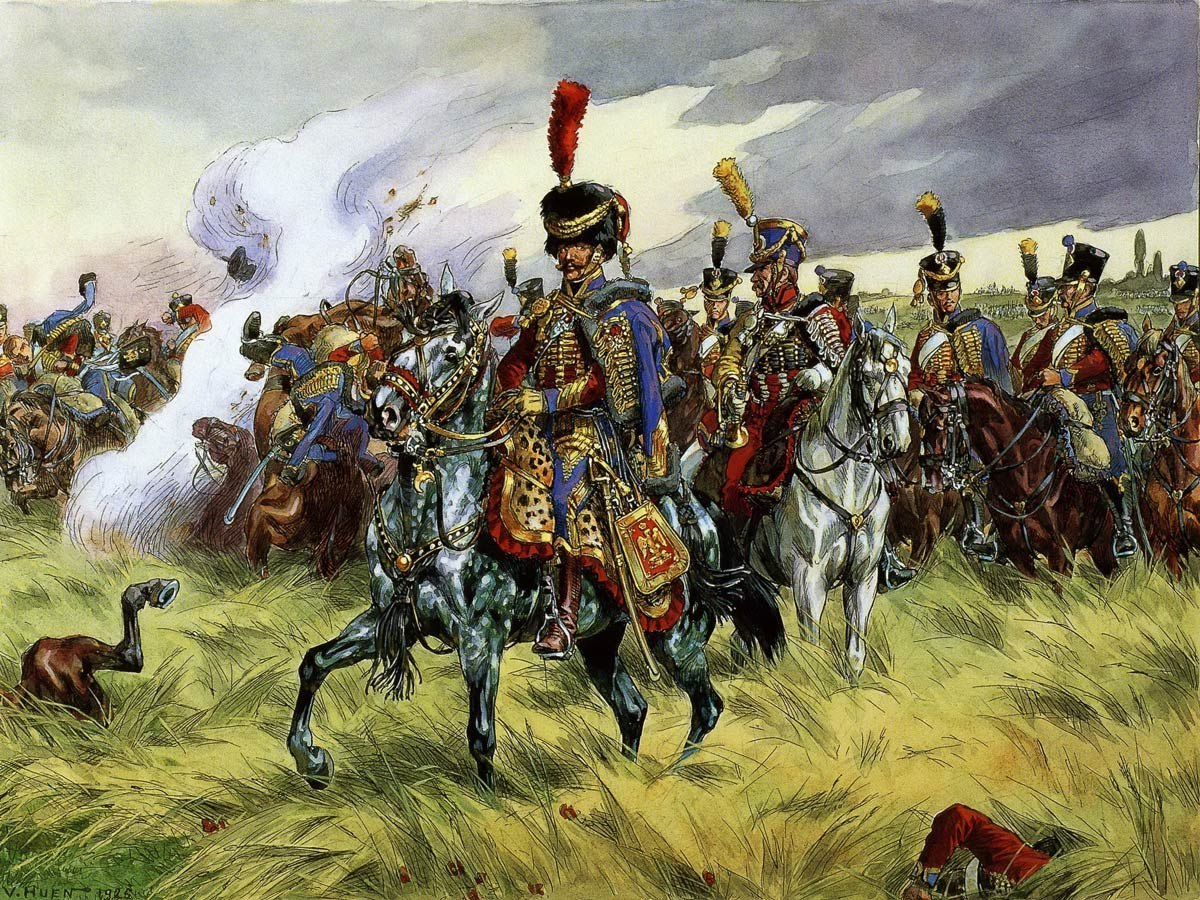
The French 9th Hussar Regiment

The hussars played a prominent role as cavalry in the Revolutionary Wars (1792–1802) and Napoleonic Wars (1803–15). As light cavalrymen mounted on fast horses, they would be used to fight skirmish battles and for scouting. Most of the great European powers raised hussar regiments. The armies of France, Austria, Prussia, and Russia had included hussar regiments since the mid-18th century. In the case of Britain, four light dragoon regiments were converted to hussars in 1806–1807.

The hussars of the period created the tradition of sabrage, the opening of a champagne bottle with a sabre. Moustaches were universally worn by Napoleonic-era hussars; the British hussars were the only moustachioed troops in the British Army—leading to their being taunted as being "foreigners", at times. French hussars also wore cadenettes, braids of hair hanging on either side of the face and held in place by pistol balls, until the practice was officially proscribed when shorter hair became universal.

The uniform of the Napoleonic hussars included the pelisse, a short fur-edged jacket which was often worn slung over one shoulder in the style of a cape and was fastened with a cord. This garment was extensively adorned with braiding (often gold or silver for officers) and several rows of buttons. The dolman or tunic, which was also decorated in braid, was worn under it. The hussar's accoutrements included a Hungarian-style saddle covered by a shabraque: a decorated saddlecloth with long, pointed corners surmounted by a sheepskin.

On active service, the hussar normally wore reinforced breeches which had leather on the inside of the leg to prevent them from wearing due to the extensive time spent in the saddle. On the outside of such breeches, running up each outer side, was a row of buttons, and sometimes a stripe in a different colour. A shako or fur kolpac (busby) was worn as headwear. The colours of the dolman, pelisse and breeches varied greatly by regiment, even within the same army.

The French hussar of the Napoleonic period was armed with a brass-hilted sabre, a carbine and sometimes with a brace of pistols, although these were often unavailable. A famous military commander in Bonaparte's army who began his military career as a hussar was Marshal Ney, who, after being employed as a clerk in an iron works, joined the 5th Hussars in 1787. He rose through the ranks of the hussars in the wars of Belgium and the Rhineland (1794–1798), fighting against the forces of Austria and Prussia before receiving his marshal's baton in 1804, after the Emperor Napoleon's coronation.

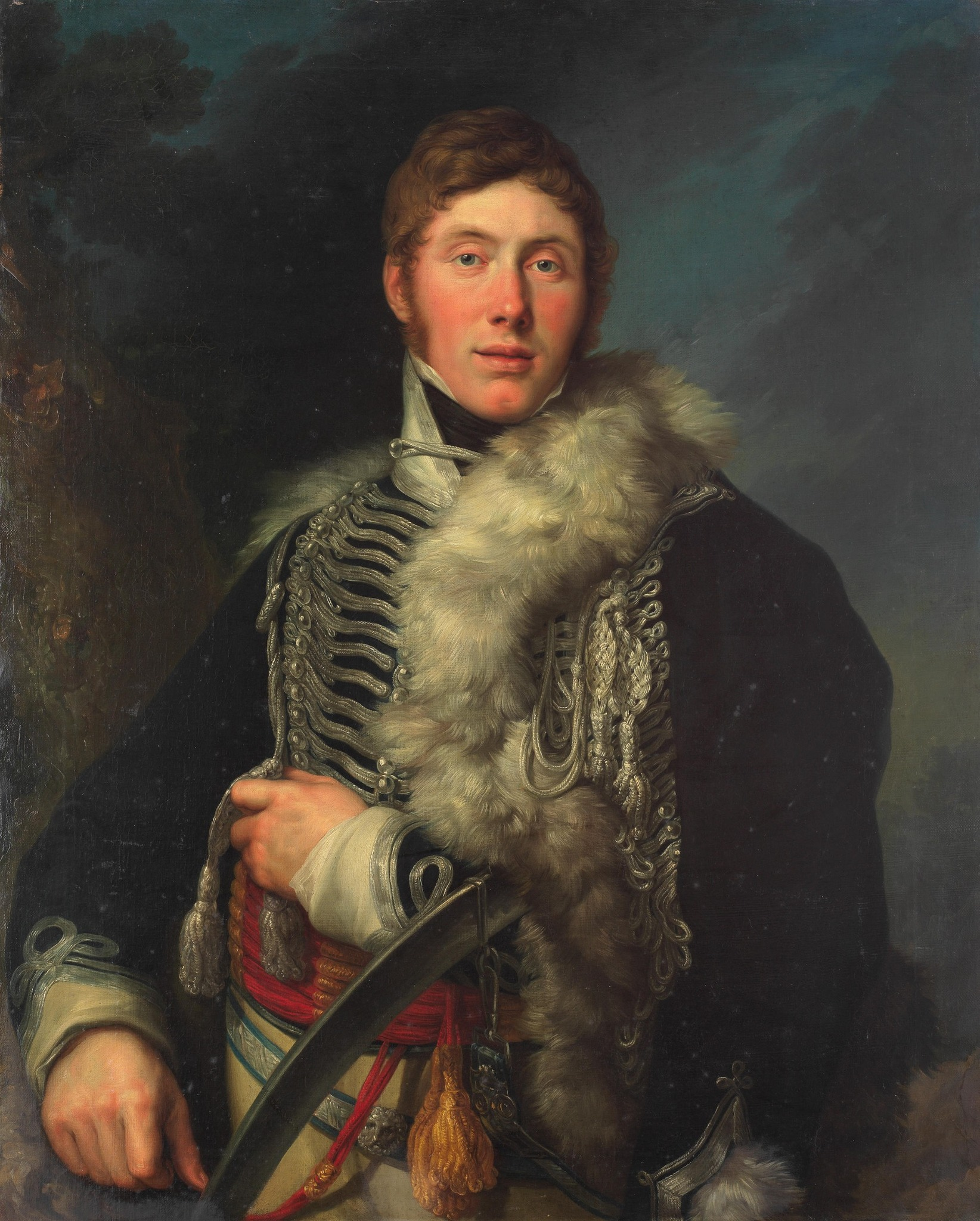
c. 1812 portrait of an 18th Hussars officer

In the British Army, hussar cavalry were introduced at a later date than in other major European armies. Towards the end of the 18th century, British light dragoon regiments began to adopt hussar style accoutrements such as laced jackets, pelisses and sabretaches. In 1805, four light dragoon regiments were permitted to use the "hussar" name, initially in parentheses after their regimental title and adopted full hussar uniforms. British hussars were armed with, in addition to firearms, the highly regarded Pattern 1796 light cavalry sabre. There were several Russian regiments of hussars by the time of Napoleonic Wars and extensive use was made of them.

==== Eastern Europe ====
Although the Romanian cavalry were not formally designated as hussars, their pre-1915 uniforms, as described below, were of the classic hussar type. These regiments were created in the second part of the 19th century, under the rule of Alexandru Ioan Cuza, creator of Romania by the unification of Moldavia and Wallachia. Romania diplomatically avoided the word hussar due to its connotation at the time with Austria-Hungary, traditional rival of the Romanian principates. Therefore, these cavalry regiments were called "călărași" in Moldavia, and later the designation "roșiori" was adopted in Wallachia. (The word călăraș means "mounted soldier", and roșior means "of red colour" which derived from the colour of their uniform.) The three (later expanded to ten) roșiori regiments were the regular units, while the călărași were territorial reserve cavalry who supplied their own horses.

These troops played an important role in the Romanian Independence War of 1877, on the Russo-Turkish front. The roșiori, as their Romanian name implies, wore red dolmans with black braiding while the călărași wore dark blue dolmans with red loopings. Both wore fur busbies and white plumes. The roșiori regiments were distinguished by the different colours of their cloth busby bags (yellow, white, green, light blue, light green, dark blue, light brown, lilac, pink and light grey according to regiment). The Regimentul 1 Roșiori "General de armată Alexandru Averescu" was formed in 1871, while the Regimentul 4 Roșiori "Regina Maria" was created in 1893.

After World War I, the differences between the two branches of Romanian cavalry disappeared, although the titles of roșiori and călărași remained. Both types of cavalry served through World War II on the Russian front as mounted and mechanised units.

==== Latin America ====
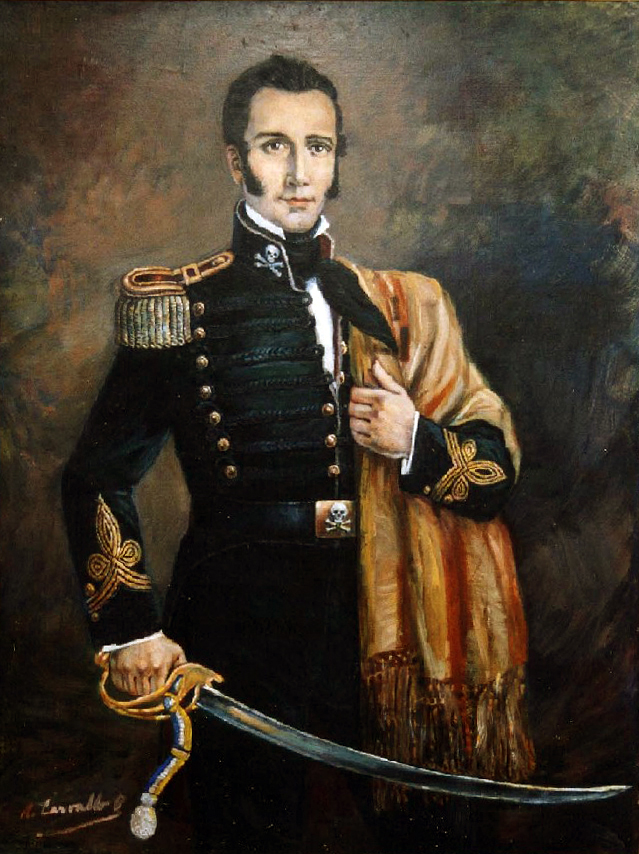
Chilean founding father Manuel Rodríguez, wearing the Húsares de la Muerte uniform

In Argentina, the 'Regimiento de Húsares del Rey' was created in 1806 to defend Buenos Aires from the British 1806–1807 expeditions. After the revolution in 1810, it became the 'Regimiento Húsares de Pueyrredón' after its founder and first colonel, Juan Martín de Pueyrredón. Today, its traditions and historic name and uniform are kept by the 8th Tank Regiment of the Argentinian Army.

In Chile, the Regimiento de Húsares de la Gran Guardia Nacional (Grand National Guard Hussars Regiment) was created by José Miguel Carrera, who was himself previously a hussar in the Spanish Army. In 1813, as part of the army of the newly independent Chile, the regiment fought against the Spanish Army until its defeat at the disaster of the Battle of Rancagua. It was dissolved by José de San Martín after the Chilean Army fled to Argentina. In addition, the 'Húsares de la Muerte', or 'Death Hussars', were created as a paramilitary corps by Manuel Rodríguez after the 'Desastre de Cancha Rayada' (Disaster of Cancha Rayada) on 26 March 1818, during the period known as the Patria Vieja (Old Fatherland).

In Peru, the squadrons of Hussars of the Peruvian Legion of the Guard were created in 1821 by General José de San Martín, from officers and troopers of the Squadron of "Hussars of the General's Escort", the former Squadron of Horse-Chasseurs of the Andes, which were included in the new army of the newly independent republic of Peru.

The 4th Squadron of the Hussars of the Peruvian Legion of the Guard was organized in Trujillo under the command of Peruvian Colonel Antonio Gutiérrez de la Fuente. Originally designated as "Cuirassiers" in 1823, it became the "Hussars of Perú" Squadron in 1824.

It was renamed "Hussars of Junín" for its performance in 1824 at the Battle of Junín, which was one of the Spanish-Peruvian battles which determined the final defeat of Spanish colonial rule.

The Hussars of Junín fought at the Battle of Ayacucho on 9 December 1824, among the liberating forces commanded by Antonio de Sucre against the Royalist Spanish forces commanded by Viceroy José de la Serna. The heroic action of the Hussars of Junín Regiment as part of the light cavalry commanded by General José María Córdova was victorious, the battle eventuating in the capitulation of the Spanish forces, affirming the final independence of Peru. For this heroic action, the "Hussars of Junín" Light Cavalry Regiment was declared the Liberator of Perú with an inscription on the regimental flag.

==== North America ====
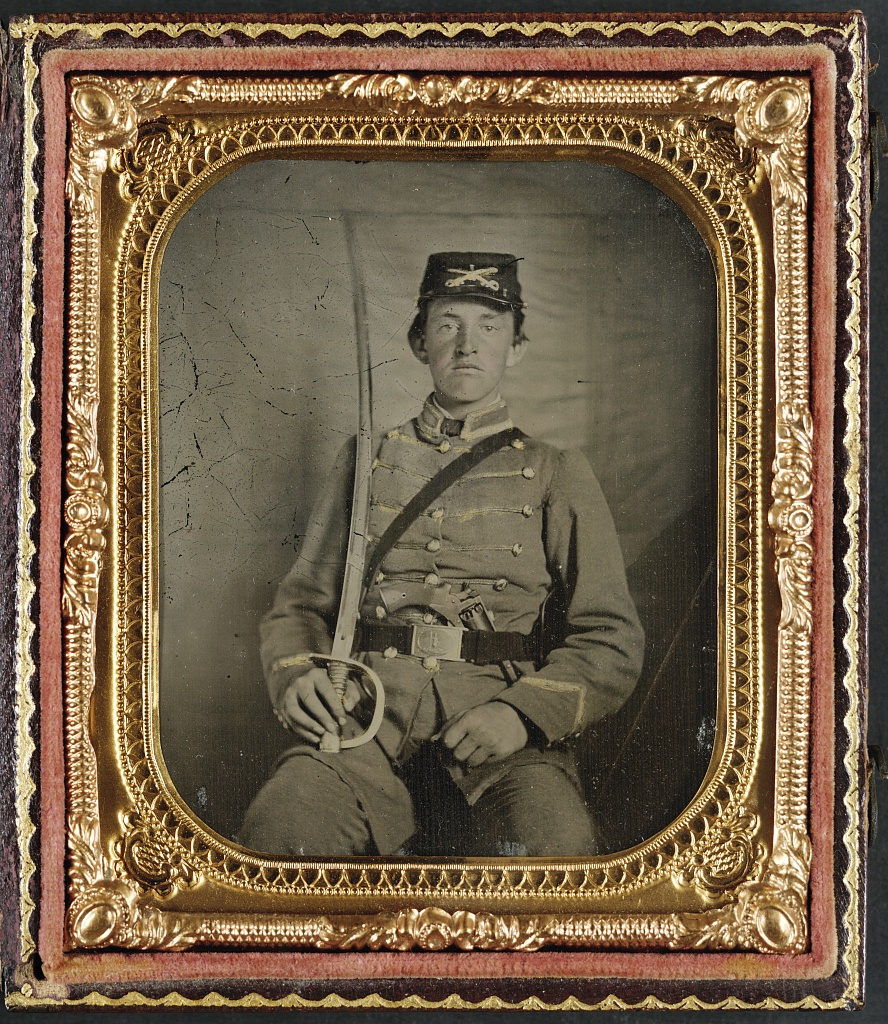
Confederate hussar from the 1st Virginia

In the United States, the Georgia Hussars were a cavalry regiment founded before the American Revolution that continues today as part of the Georgia National Guard. The Hussars served the State of Georgia as part of the Confederate States Army during the American Civil War, and after reconciliation served in Mexico, World War I, World War II, Korea, Vietnam, Desert Storm, Bosnia and Herzegovina, and The War on Terror. Another famous Confederate regiment designated as Hussars were the 1st Virginia Cavalry, known as the Black Horse Troop. Their grey uniforms had black facings, and unique rows of braid across the chest.

The Union army had two hussar regiments during the Civil War. The 3rd New Jersey Cavalry, nicknamed the Butterflies, wore dark blue pelisses with yellow braid, short blue cloaks with red lining, and a distinctive peakless forage cap similar to the British army. The 5th Missouri Cavalry, known as the Benton Hussars, wore sky blue uniforms with dark blue facings and chest braid. On campaign, a kepi was worn in place of the traditional fur cap. The Benton Hussars served as General Charles S. Hamilton's elite bodyguard, and distinguished themselves at the Battle of Pea Ridge and the Battle of Iuka in 1862.

=== Hussars in the early 20th century ===
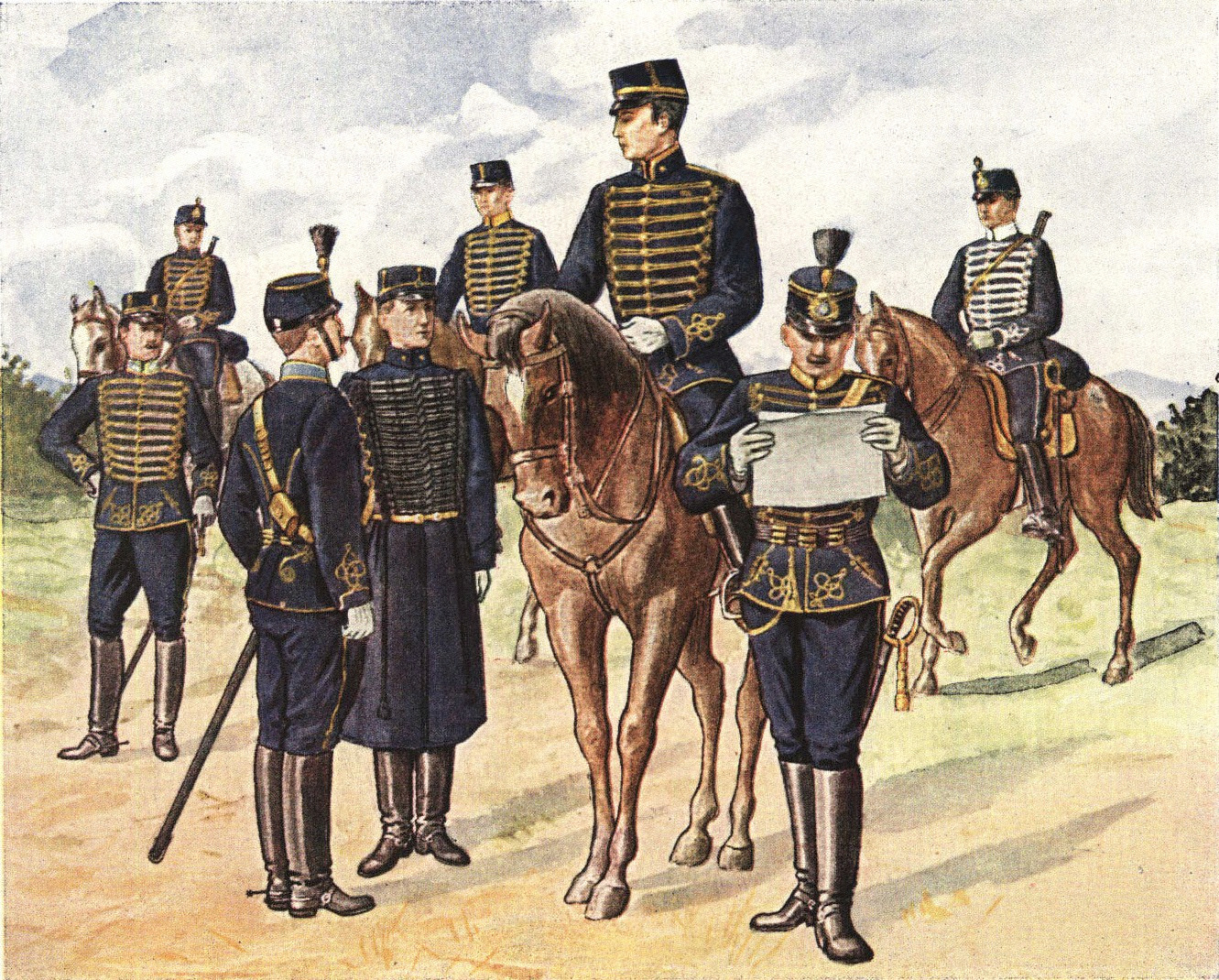
Swedish hussar regiments 1895–1910

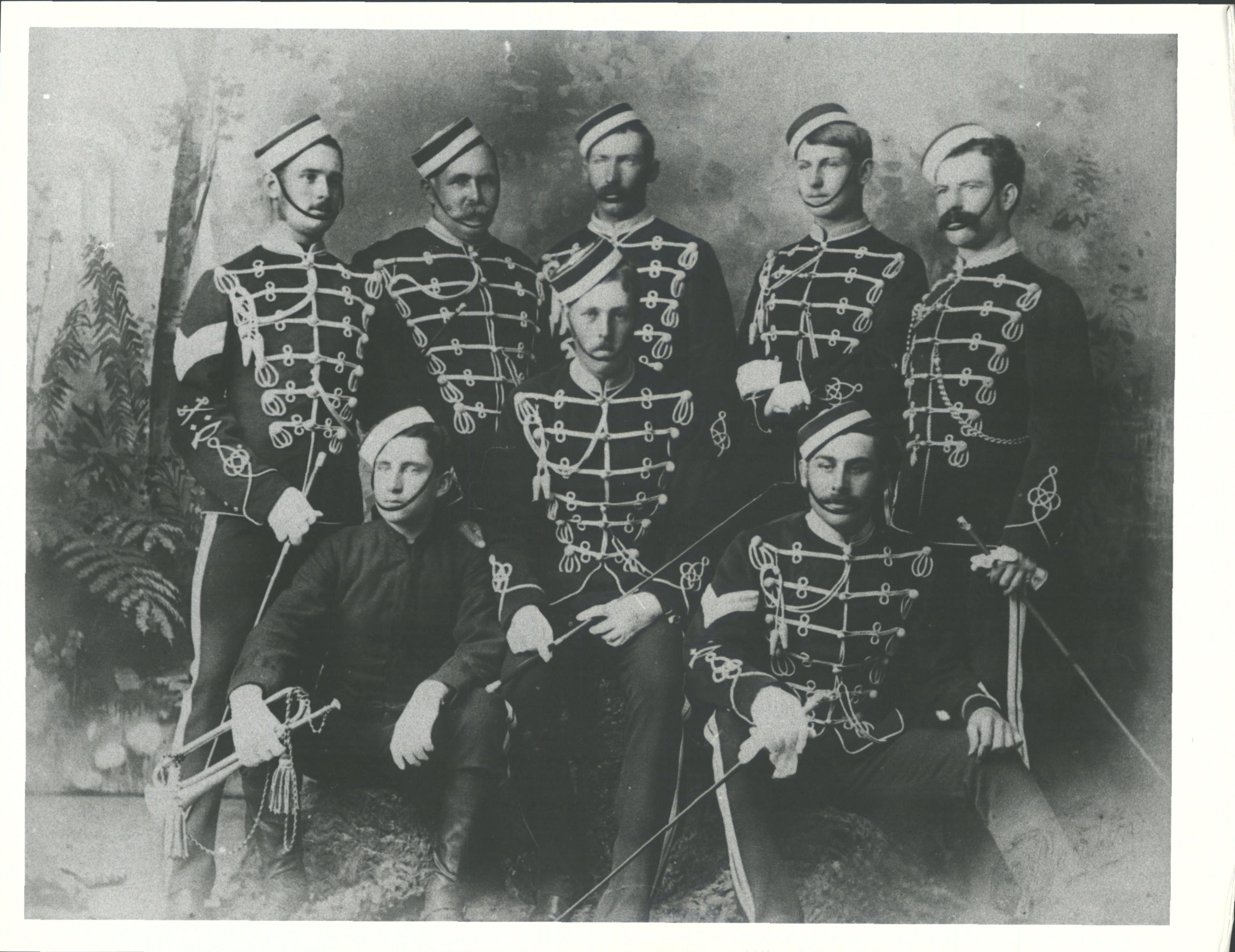
5th Mounted Rifles Otago Hussars from New Zealand, 1911.

On the eve of World War I, there were still hussar regiments in the British, Canadian, French, New Zealand, Spanish, German, Russian, Dutch, Danish, Swedish, Romanian, and Austro-Hungarian armies. In most respects, they had now become regular light cavalry, recruited solely from their own countries and trained and equipped along the same lines as other classes of cavalry. But Hussars were still notable for their colourful and elaborate parade uniforms, the most spectacular of which were those worn by the two Spanish regiments, Húsares de Pavía and Húsares de la Princesa.

A characteristic of both the Imperial German and Russian Hussars was the variety of colours apparent in their dress uniforms. These included red, black, green, dark and light blue, brown and even pink (the Russian 15th Hussars) dolmans. Most Russian hussar regiments wore red breeches, as did all the Austro-Hungarian hussars of 1914. This rainbow-effect harked back to the 18th-century origins of hussar regiments in these armies and helped regrouping after battle or a charge.

The fourteen French hussar regiments were an exception to this rule – they wore the same relatively simple uniform, with only minor distinctions, as the other branches of French light cavalry. This comprised a shako, light blue tunic and red breeches. The twelve British hussar regiments were distinguished by different coloured busby bags and a few other distinctions such as the yellow plumes of the 20th, the buff collars of the 13th and the crimson breeches of the 11th Hussars.

Hussar influences were apparent even in those armies which did not formally include hussar regiments. Thus, both the Belgian Guides (prior to World War I) and the Mounted Escort, the so-called Blue Hussars, of the Irish Defence Forces (during the 1930s) wore hussar-style uniforms.

== Image and uniform ==
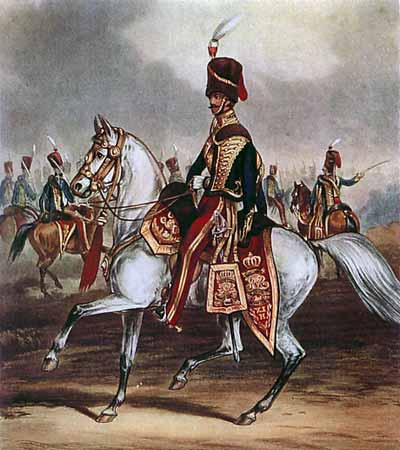
An officer of the British 11th Hussars (PAO) in the full dress of 1856, including dolman, pelisse, busby and sabretache

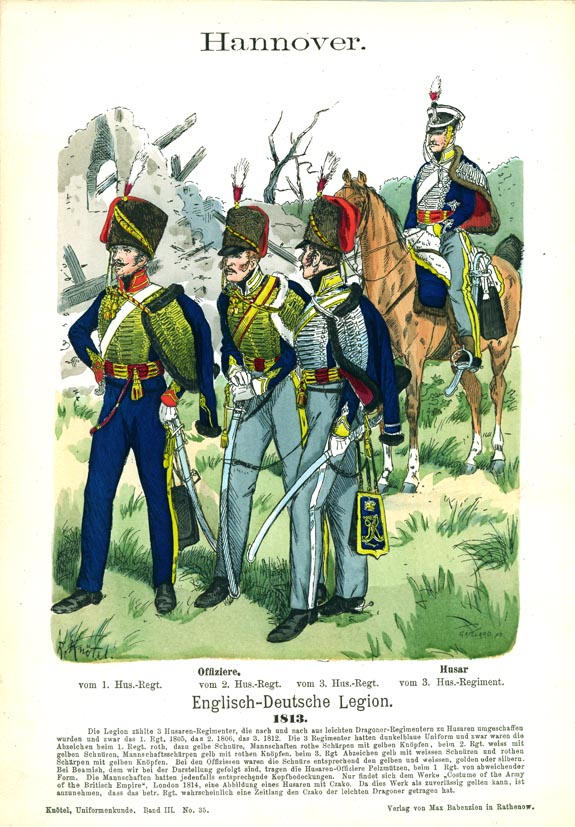
Hussars of the King's German Legion in 1813, all armed with the 1796 sabre

The colourful military uniforms of hussars from 1700 onwards were inspired by the prevailing Hungarian fashions of the day. Usually, this uniform consisted of a short jacket known as a dolman, or later a medium-length atilla jacket, both with heavy, horizontal gold braid (sujtás) on the breast and yellow braided or gold Austrian knots (vitézkötés) on the sleeves, a matching pelisse (a short-waisted over-jacket often worn slung over one shoulder), colourful riding breeches, sometimes with yellow braided or gold Austrian knots at the front, a busby (kucsma) (a high, fur hat with a cloth bag hanging from one side, although some regiments wore the shako (csákó) of various styles), and high riding boots (often Hessian boots). A sabretache, an ornate pouch hung from the belt, often completed the accoutrements.

European hussars traditionally wore long moustaches (but no beards) and long hair, with two plaits hanging in front of the ears as well as a larger queue at the back, a style known as the cadenette. They often retained the queue, which used to be common to all soldiers, after other regiments had dispensed with it and adopted short hair.

Hussars had a reputation for being the dashing, if unruly, adventurers of the army. The traditional image of the hussar is of a reckless, hard-drinking, womanising, moustachioed swashbuckler. General Lasalle, an archetypal hussar officer, epitomized this attitude by his remarks, among which the most famous is: "Any hussar who is not dead by the age of thirty is a blackguard." He died at the Battle of Wagram at the age of 34.

Arthur Conan Doyle's character Brigadier Etienne Gerard of the French Hussards de Conflans has come to epitomise the hussar of popular fiction – brave, conceited, amorous, a skilled horseman and (according to Napoleon) not very intelligent. Brigadier Gerard's boast that the Hussards de Conflans (an actual regiment) could set a whole population running, the men away from them and the women towards them, may be taken as a fair representation of the esprit de corps of this class of cavalry.

Less romantically, 18th-century hussars were also known (and feared) for their poor treatment of local civilians. In addition to commandeering local food-stocks for the army, hussars were known to also use the opportunity for personal looting and pillaging.

The 1930 operetta Viktoria und ihr Husar (Victoria and her Hussar) has been filmed several times.

== Armament and tactics ==
Hussar armament varied over time. Until the 17th century, it included a cavalry sabre, lance, long wooden shield and, optionally, light, metal armour or simple leather vest. Their usual form of attack was a rapid charge in compact formation against enemy infantry or cavalry units. If the first attack failed, they would retire to their supporting troops, who re-equipped them with fresh lances, and then would charge again.

Apart from the Polish sabre and the lance, Polish hussars were usually equipped with two or more horse pistols, a small rounded shield, and koncerz (a long thrusting sword up to 2 m (6 ft 7 in), which was used during mounted charges, when the lance was either broken or lost), some even carried a mace, horseman's pick, or war hammer. The Polish hussars abandoned the use of the "Balkan" shield (a large shield of an asymmetric shape) by the 1590s, and most of them were now equipped with metal breastplates.

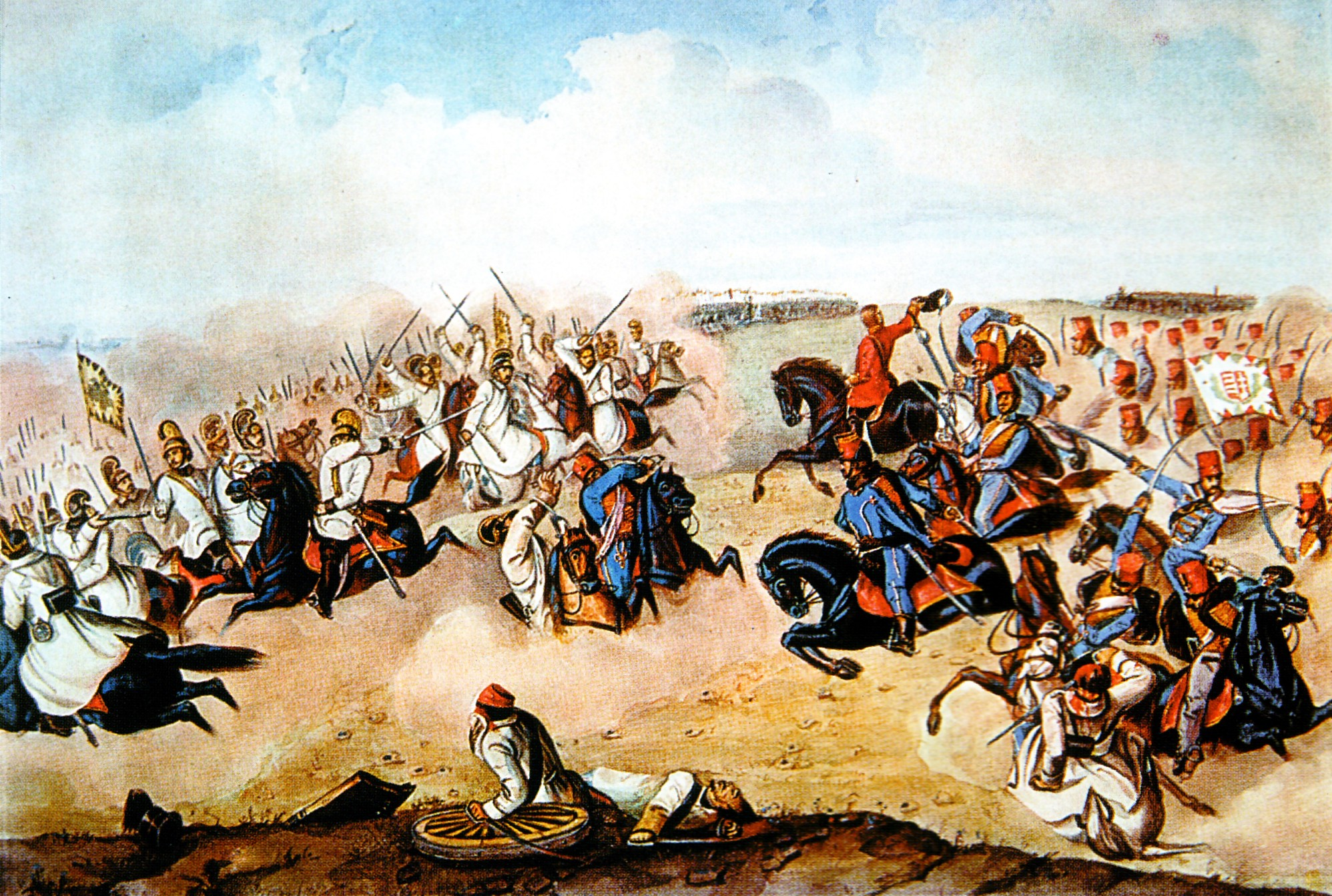
Hungarian hussars in battle during the Hungarian Revolution of 1848

Unlike their lighter counterparts, the Polish hussars were used as a heavy cavalry for line-breaking charges against enemy infantry or cavalry units. The famous low losses were achieved by the unique tactic of late concentration. Until the first musket salvo of the enemy infantry, the hussars approached relatively slowly, in a loose formation. Each rider was at least 5 steps away from his colleagues and the infantry, still using undeveloped muskets, could not aim at any particular cavalryman. Also, if a hussar's horse was wounded, the following lines had time to steer clear of him. After the salvo, the cavalry rapidly accelerated and tightened the ranks. At the moment of the clash of the charging cavalry with the defenders, the hussars were riding knee-to-knee.

Hussars of the Polish–Lithuanian Commonwealth were also famous for the huge wings worn on their backs or attached to the saddles of their horses. Several theories attempt to explain the meaning of the wings. According to some, they were designed to foil attacks by the Tatar lasso; another theory maintains that the sound of vibrating feathers attached to the wings made a strange sound that frightened enemy horses during the charge. However, recent experiments performed by Polish historians in 2001, did not support any of these theories and the phenomenon remains unexplained. They might have simply intended as a distinctive feature. The wings were probably worn only during parades and not during combat, but this explanation is also disputed. Because Poland has a large population of devout Catholics, it seems possible the wings and uniforms were meant to resemble St. Michael the Archangel.

In the 18th and 19th centuries, hussars of Central and Western Europe retained the use of the sabre. Some cavalrymen such as chasseurs were also armed with firearms, primarily pistols or carbines.

== Culture ==
The 18th-century Verbunkos (from German werben, "enroll in the army"; verbunkos means recruiter) was a Hungarian dance and music genre performed during military recruiting, which was a frequent event during this period, hence the character of the music. The verbunkos was an important component of the Hungarian hussar tradition. Potential recruits were dressed in items of hussar uniform, given wine to drink and invited to dance to this music.

== Legacy ==
=== Armoured units ===
After horse cavalry became obsolete, hussar units were generally converted to armoured units, though retaining their traditional titles. Hussar regiments still exist today, and horses are sometimes used for ceremonial purposes. In the British Army (although amalgamations have reduced their number to only two), the French Army, the Swedish Army (Livregementets husarer, the Life Regiment Hussars), the Dutch Army and the Canadian Forces, they are usually tank forces or light mechanized infantry. The Danish Guard Hussars provide a ceremonial mounted squadron, which is the last to wear the slung pelisse.

=== Police hussars in Germany ===
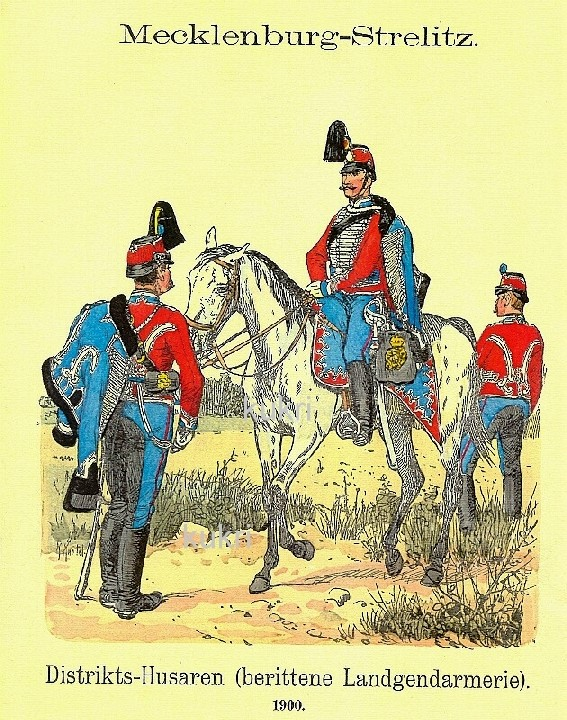
Gendarmes of Mecklenburg-Strelitz in 1900

In certain German states, notably Rheinpfalz, Mecklenburg-Schwerin and Mecklenburg-Strelitz, hussars were sometimes used as a mounted police force or gendarmerie. A rare exception to the usual pattern of German police uniforms were those of the Mecklenburg-Strelitzsche Districts-Husaren. This gendarmerie corps retained their 19th century-style uniforms until 1905.

== Current hussar units ==
=== Argentina ===
The 'Regimiento Húsares de Pueyrredón' (10th Tank Pueyrredon Hussars Regiment) currently serves as an armoured regiment (10th Tank Cavalry Regiment "Husares de Pueyrredón") of the Argentine Army using its revolution-era full dress uniforms worn during formal parades.

=== Bulgaria ===
The National Guards Unit of Bulgaria were established as a hussar regiment in 1879 and served as the personal escort of Alexander I of Bulgaria. In modern times they serve as the president's honor guard and security detail, and carry AK-47s and SKS instead of sabres, worn only by officers assigned to the unit.

=== Canada ===
Regiments in the Primary Reserve:

Regiment	Full-dress tunic	Full-dress headdress
1st Hussars	Blue with buff collar	Busby, buff bag, white plume
8th Canadian Hussars (Princess Louise's)	Blue with white collar	Busby, white bag and plume
The Royal Canadian Hussars (Montreal)	Blue with white collar	Busby, white bag and plume
The Sherbrooke Hussars	Blue with black collar	Wolseley helmet

Regiments on the Supplementary Order of Battle:

- 14th Canadian Hussars

=== Chile ===
The only remaining hussar unit in the Chilean Army is the 3rd Cavalry Regiment "Hussars" (Regimiento de Caballería n.º 3 "Húsares") in Angol. It forms part of the 3rd Army Mountain Division and is the only horse-mounted regiment remaining in the army, aside from the Presidential Horse Grenadiers. The regiment has a mounted troop and mounted military band. It is named after one of the nation's founding fathers, José Miguel de Carrera, and is informally named "The Hussars of Death", as the successor regiment to Manuel Rodríguez's cavalry unit of that name. The modern regiment has the Totenkopf as its insignia as well as on the regimental camp flag.

=== Denmark ===
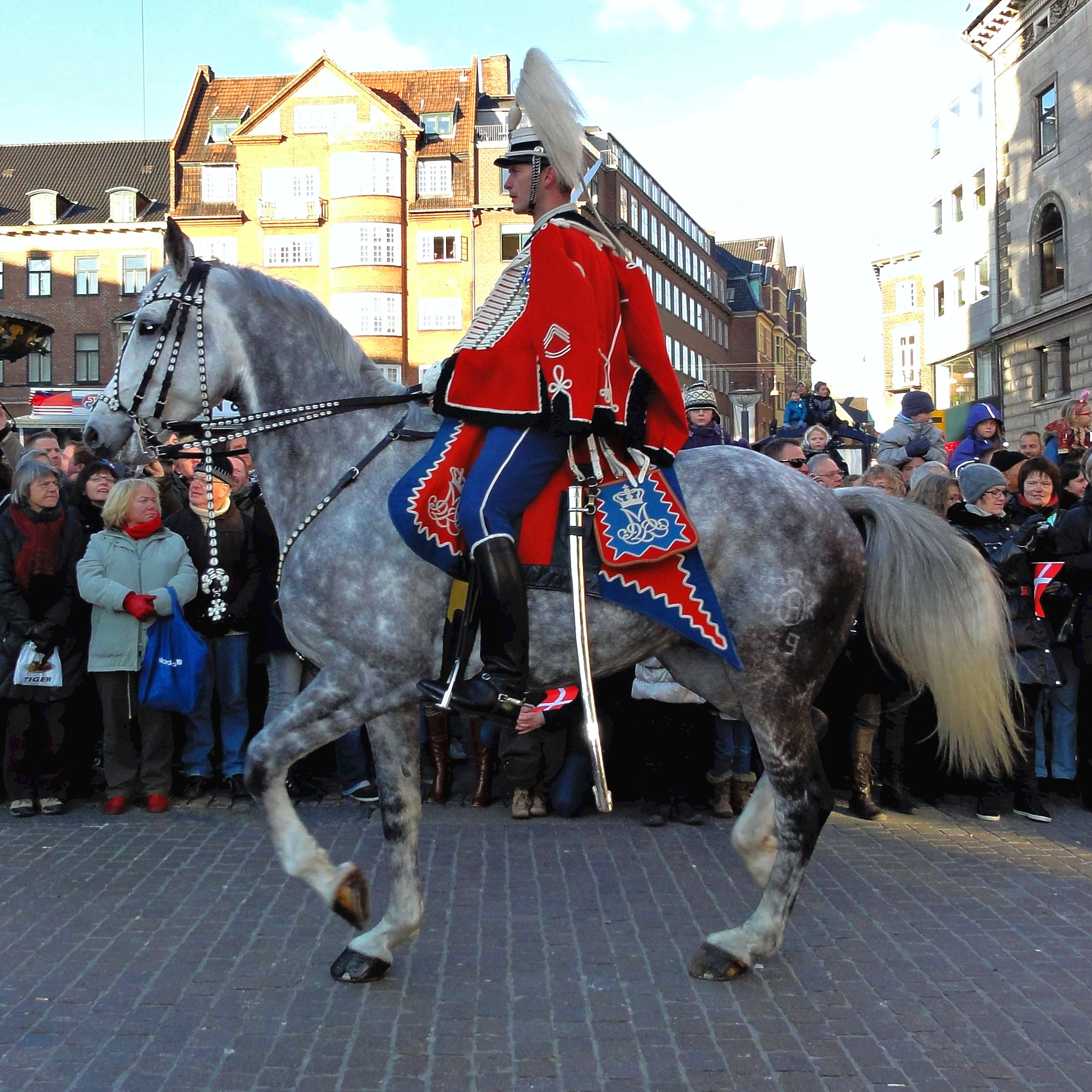
A Danish Guard Hussar in mounted parade uniform, including the red pelisse, sabretache and shabraque

Gardehusarregimentet (English: The Guard Hussar Regiment), founded in 1762, is currently a unit with four battalions: an armoured infantry battalion, a light (motorized) reconnaissance battalion and two training battalions. In addition to its operational role, the Guard Hussar Regiment is one of two regiments in the Danish Army (along with the Den Kongelige Livgarde) to be categorised as 'Guards'; in this case, the Mounted Squadron perform the same role as the Household Cavalry do in the British Army. In mounted parade uniform, the Gardehusarregimentet are the only hussars to still wear the slung and braided pelisse, which was formerly characteristic of this class of cavalry.

=== France ===
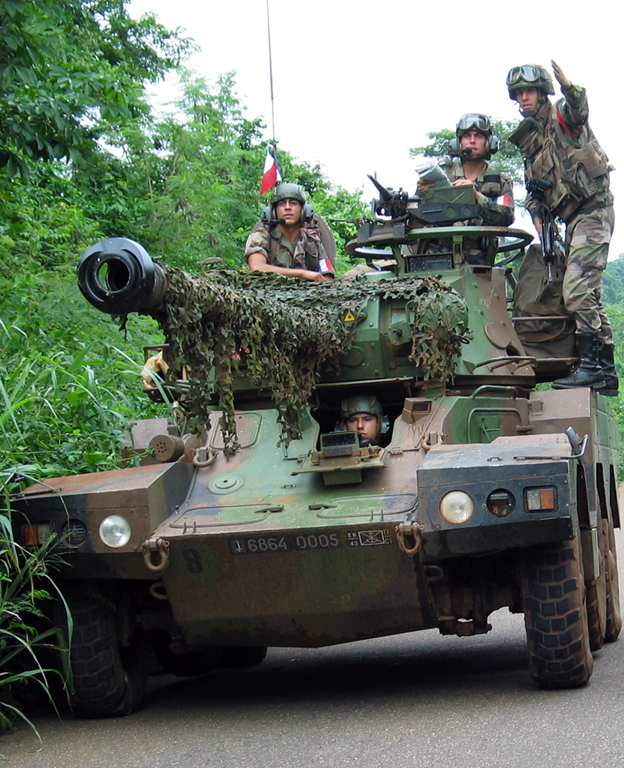
An ERC 90 Sagaie of the 1st Parachute Hussar Regiment of the French Army in Côte d'Ivoire in 2003

- 1st Parachute Hussar Regiment (1^{er} régiment de hussards parachutistes (1^{er} RHP). Founded in 1720, this regiment is currently stationed in Tarbes, Hautes-Pyrénées, France. They were formerly the "Hussards de Bercheny", after their founder, Count Bercheny, a Hungarian noble.
- 2e régiment de hussards (2^{e} RH) (2nd Hussar Regiment). Founded in 1735, currently stationed in Haguenau, Bas-Rhin, France. Traditionally called "Chamborant".
- 3e régiment de hussards (3^{e} RH) (3rd Hussar Regiment). Founded in 1764, currently stationed in Metz, France. Part of the Franco-German Brigade. Formerly the "Hussards d'Esterhazy".

Because of political upheavals such as the French Revolution and the Restoration of 1815, the French hussar regiments do not have the same historical continuity as their counterparts in some other armies.

Hussard noir ('black hussar') was the nickname given to primary-school teachers during the Third Republic, referring to their black coats. Originally written by essayist Charles Péguy in 1913, the phrase hussard noir de la République ('the black knights of the Republic') has a military undertone: It is meant to capture the tense atmosphere of the late 19th century in France, as schoolteachers felt entrusted with a superior mission to actively promote republican and secular values, among a largely illiterate population still much influenced by the authority of royalist or Catholic powers. The phrase is still commonly used in public discourse, to emphasize the moral and civic role played by schoolteachers (or occasionally, journalists, etc.) in the enlightenment of citizens in a democracy.

=== Ireland ===
The Mounted Escort, popularly known as Blue Hussars, was an Irish Army unit which was used for state and ceremonial functions and wore bright blue hussar-style uniforms. They were created in 1932 and disbanded in 1948. The name is sometimes used to refer to their successors: the motorcycle unit that has provided presidential escort since then.

=== Lithuania ===
The King Mindaugas Hussar Battalion of the Iron Wolf Mechanised Infantry Brigade is a unit of the Lithuanian Land Forces. It is named after King Mindaugas of Lithuania (c. 1203–1263).

=== Netherlands ===
The Dutch word for hussar is huzaar.

- Regiment Huzaren Van Sytzama, eldest element founded in 1577; disbanded in 2012
- Regiment Huzaren Prins van Oranje, eldest element founded in 1668
- Regiment Huzaren Prins Alexander eldest element founded in 1672; disbanded in 2007
- Regiment Huzaren van Boreel, eldest element founded in 1585
- Regiment Huzaren Prinses Catharina-Amalia, amalgamated from Huzaren Regiments Prins Van Oranje, Prins Alexander and Van Sytzama in 2020

Except for the Huzaren van Boreel, the regiments operate in an armoured role in one of the two mechanised brigades of the Dutch army, using the Leopard 2 main battle tank. Each of these brigades also has a squadron from the Huzaren van Boreel attached for reconnaissance. There is also a mounted unit for ceremonies: Cavalerie Ere-Escorte. It is linked to the Huzaren Prins Alexander, although riders from other regiments participate as well.

=== Peru ===
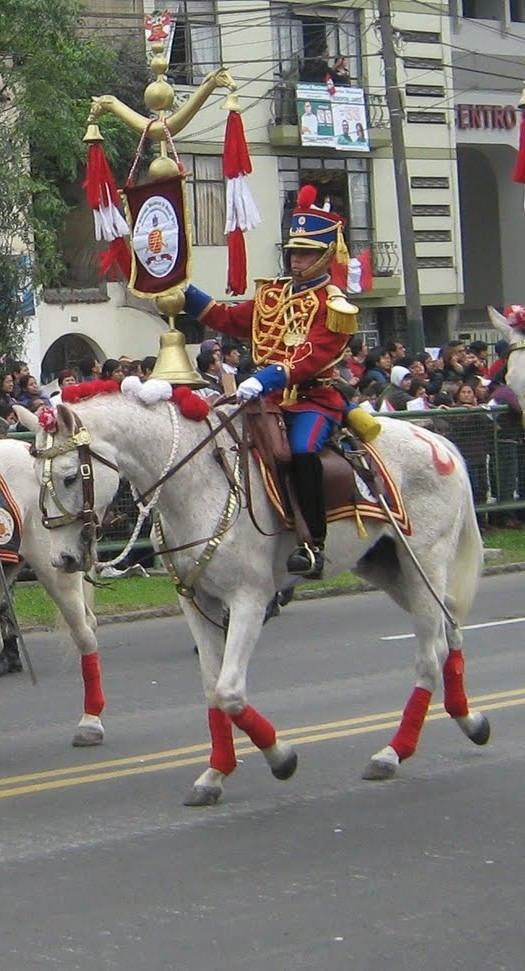
Officer of the 1st. Cavalry Regiment "Hussars of Junín" Liberator of Perú

The 1st Light Cavalry Regiment, the "Glorious Hussars of Junín", was until 2012 the horse guards unit of the Peruvian Army, with a history spanning almost two centuries. Raised on August 18, 1821, by José de San Martín as the mounted component of the Peruvian Guard Legion, the regiment served in the final battles of the Latin American wars of independence in Junin and Ayacucho, in the Gran Colombia–Peru War, in the War of the Confederation and in the War of the Pacific.

Following an extended period as part of the Army Education Command, the regiment became the Presidential horse guards regiment in 1987. However, by Ministerial Resolution No 139-2012/DE/EP of 2 February 2012, signed under the administration of President Ollanta Humala Tasso, the Field Marshal Domingo Nieto Cavalry Regiment has been reestablished as the official presidential escort, with the main mission of guaranteeing the security of the President of the Republic and the Government Palace of Perú in Lima.

The Hussars of Junín wear a stylised dress uniform of a blue and red shako, red coat and blue breeches modelled on that worn in 1824 in the Battle of Junín. This uniform is of similar design, but with different colors and braiding, to that worn by the Argentine Regiment of Mounted Grenadiers General San Martín, which assisted in its raising and in the training of its first troopers.

The Hussars of Junin carry lances and sabers on parade and perform as a ceremonial guard together with the Marshal Nieto Dragoon Guards and the other ceremonial units of the Peruvian Armed Forces and the National Police of Peru. As noted above, The Hussars of Junín no longer serve as the presidential escort but are now based in the Peruvian Army Education Command and still participates in ceremonies and parades, representing the Peruvian Army. The regiment also provides honor guards and escorts for welcoming-ceremonies and other events of national importance. An example of such occasions is the annual ceremony commemorating the 1929 reintegration of the Tacna Region into Peru.

=== Spain ===
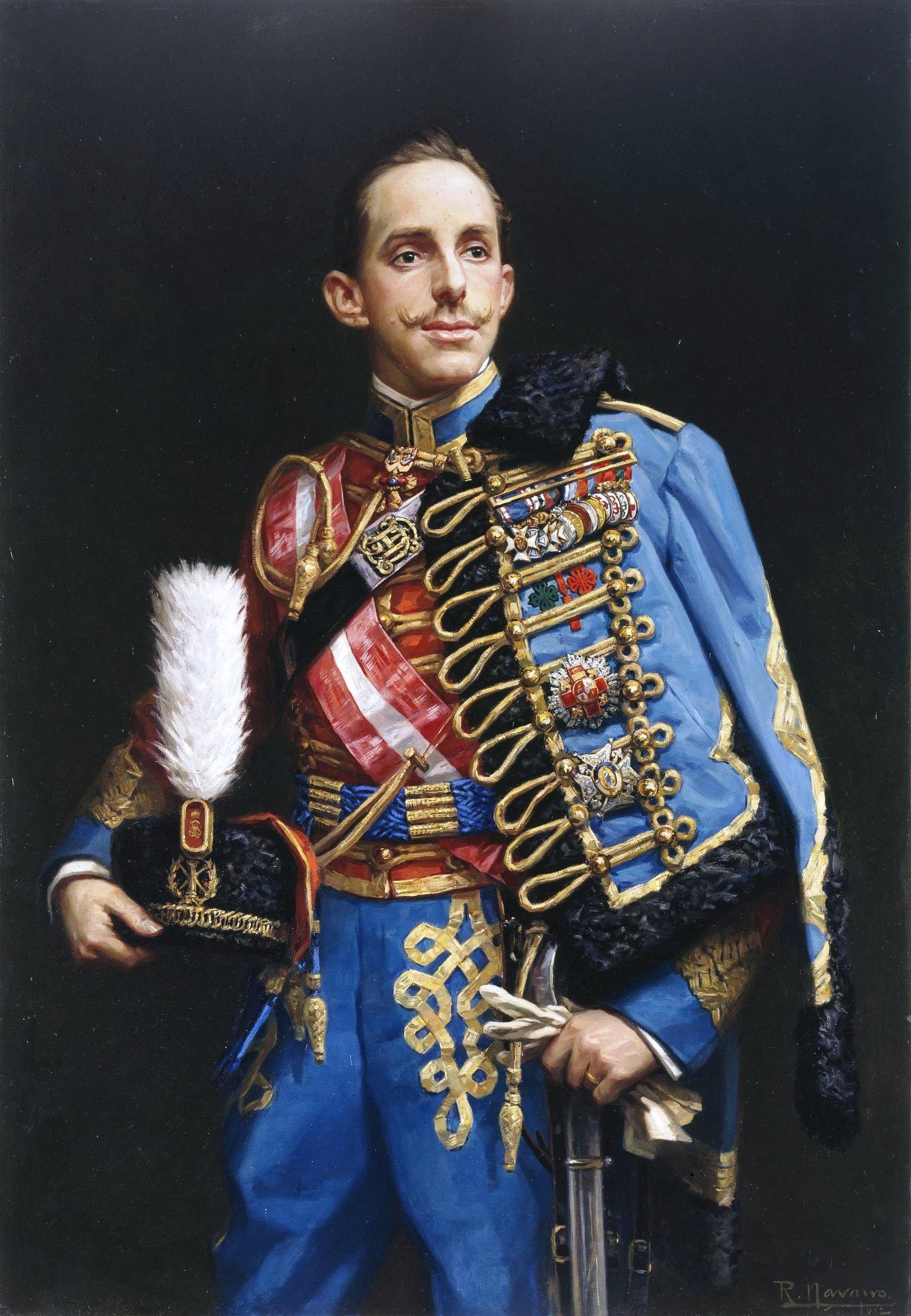
Alfonso XIII of Spain wearing the Regiment no. 4 "Pavia Húsares (Hussars) uniform, 1912

The Spanish Army still retains one of its historic hussar regiments: the Húsares de Pavía, plus a mechanised cavalry group which commemorates the hussars as a corps:

- Húsares de Pavía: Regimiento Acorazado de Caballería Pavía n^{o} 4 (the Pavía Armoured Cavalry Regiment no. 4 Pavia Húsares (Hussars), garrisoned in Zaragoza, Spain.
- Húsares Españoles: (Grupo de Caballería Mecanizado "Húsares Españoles" II/11)

Historic regiments now disbanded included:

- Húsares de la Princesa
- Húsares de Calatrava
- Húsares de Fernando VII
- Húsares de Iberia
- Húsares de Cantabria
- Húsares de Castilla
- Húsares de Cataluña
- Húsares de San Andres
- Húsares de Aragón
- Húsares de Arlabán (Carlist)

=== Sweden ===
Livregementets husarer (English: 'Life Regiment Hussars'). One of the most distinguished hussar regiments in European history, with roots extending back to 1536. Today, Livregementets husarer, also known as K 3, is the last active hussar regiment in Sweden and trains 31st Ranger Battalion, 32nd Intelligence Battalion, and hosts the Swedish Army's Parachute Ranger School and the Armed Forces Survival School.

=== United Kingdom ===
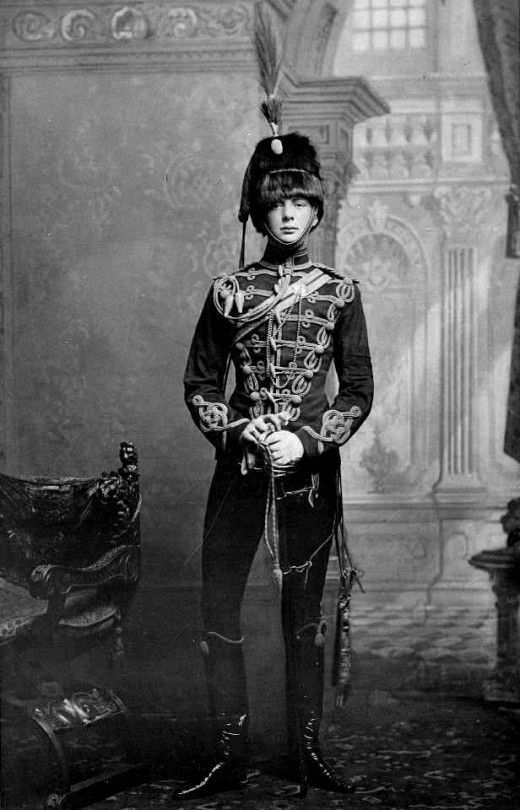
Winston Churchill as Cornet of the 4th Queen's Own Hussars, aged 21 (1895)

- Queen's Royal Hussars
- King's Royal Hussars
- C (Royal Gloucestershire Hussars) Squadron, the Royal Wessex Yeomanry
- 710 (Royal Buckinghamshire Hussars) Squadron RLC

Presently, the first two regiments and C Sqn RWxY operate in the armoured role, primarily operating the Challenger 2 main battle tank. The Hussar regiments are grouped together with the Dragoon and Lancer regiments in the order of precedence, all of which are below the Dragoon Guards. A Dragoon regiment, the Light Dragoons, was formed by the amalgamation of two Hussar regiments, the 13th/18th Royal Hussars and the 15th/19th The King's Royal Hussars, in 1992, reversing the mid-19th-century trend of all existing light-dragoon regiments being converted to hussars. 710 (Royal Buckinghamshire Hussars) Laundry Squadron, RLC is a Reserve Operational Hygiene Squadron within 165 Port and Maritime Regiment RLC and was formed in April 2014 from 60 Signal Squadron, Royal Corps of Signals.

The Light Cavalry HAC also wear hussar uniform.

=== Venezuela ===
The Presidential Honor Guard Brigade of Venezuela wear hussar style full-dress uniforms, thus maintaining the traditions and legacy of Simón Bolívar's Hussar Troop. This unit was established in 1815, serving under Bolivar during the Venezuelan War of Independence and Spanish American wars of independence. The modern brigade serves as a ceremonial escort to the President of Venezuela at Miraflores Palace and attends all state arrival ceremonies conducted there, as well as providing security for the palace complex. The brigade also provides honor guards (i) at the Tomb of the Unknown Soldier at Carabobo Field, Carabobo commemorating the memory of national heroes and the fallen of the Battle of Carabobo; (ii) at the Montana Barracks in Caracas in memory of the late Hugo Chávez; and (iii) at the National Pantheon in Caracas in memory of Bolívar and other national heroes buried there. The brigade also performs public-duty functions as required. Brigade personnel come from all branches of the National Bolivarian Armed Forces of Venezuela and public security services. The brigade is commanded by a general or flag officer and includes a Presidential mounted escort of platoon size.

== See also ==
- Uhlan
- Cossacks
- Russian Hussars
- Cuirassier
- Dragoon
- Lancer
- Pandurs
