= Regiment Huzaren van Boreel =

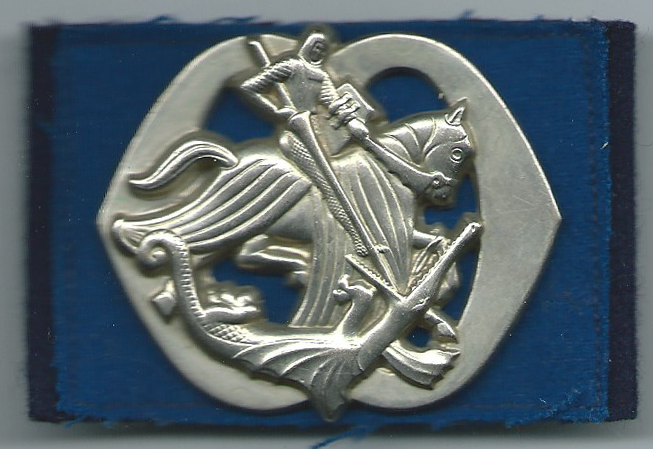
- Cap badge of the Regiment Huzaren van Boreel
- Active: 1813 - present
- Country: Netherlands
- Branch: Royal Netherlands Army
- Type: Line cavalry
- Role: Reconnaissance
- Size: One regiment

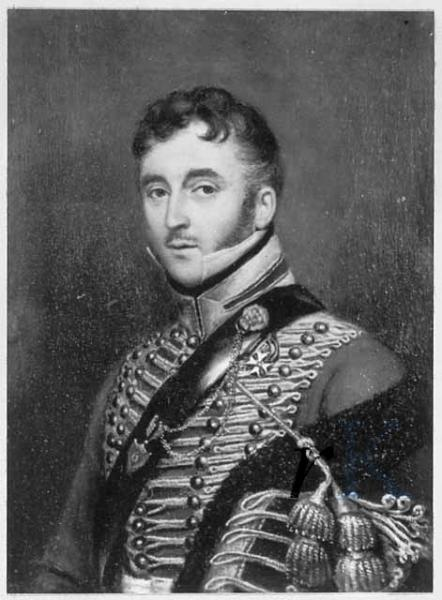
Willem François Boreel (1774 - 1851) founder of the regiment

The Regiment Huzaren van Boreel is an armoured regiment of the Royal Netherlands Army, named for Willem Francois Boreel. It currently serves in the armoured Intelligence, Surveillance, Target Acquisition, Reconnaissance (ISTAR) role; the regiment provides armoured reconnaissance squadrons assigned to the 43 Mechanised Brigade, 13 Light Brigade and 11 Airmobile Brigade. An STA artillery unit, an electronic warfare unit, Human Intelligence (HUMINT) unit and imagery intelligence unit are all formed into a single battalion attached to the Combat Support Brigade (Operationeel Ondersteuningscommando Landmacht, or OOCL).

== Armoured reconnaissance ==
The most important role of the regiment Huzaren van Boreel is armoured reconnaissance. To perform this task, the regiment has two brigade reconnaissance squadrons, one per mechanized brigade: 42 BVE (Brigade Verkennings Eskadron) for the 13th Mechanized Brigade, 43 BVE for the 43rd Mechanized Brigade.

The current motto of these units is "See without being seen", as opposed to the cold-war-era "Find, Bind and Strike", where the units would find the enemy, engage them, deliver an artillery strike, and speed off (the goal was to delay the Soviets long enough for NATO troops to arrive). With the new philosophy, the combat task of these units has faded away. Where the units were previously armed with tanks, AIFVs and even their own artillery, nowadays they are equipped with the state-of-the-art Fennek reconnaissance vehicle.

A BVE typically consists of three reconnaissance platoons with eight vehicles each, 24 people total, an anti-tank platoon equipped with four Fennek MRAT (with the Spike medium-range anti-tank missile), a logistics platoon and a staff platoon. The two armoured reconnaissance squadrons of 103 ISTAR battalion, 103 and 104 GGVE (ground-based reconnaissance squadrons), are similarly equipped, but instead of an anti-tank section, they have three Fenneks to support a Tactical Air Control Party in the forward air-control role.

The traditions of the Huzaren van Boreel are upheld by the following reconnaissance units:

42 Brigade reconnaissance squadron; this unit belongs to the 13th Light Brigade and is stationed at the De Ruyter van Steveninck barracks in Oirschot. They have the light reconnaissance and surveillance vehicle (LVB) Fennek and perform their tasks both mounted and on foot.

43 Brigade reconnaissance squadron; belonging to the 43rd Mechanized Brigade and stationed at the Johannes Post barracks in Havelte. This unit also has the LVB Fennek and performs both mounted and on foot.

11 Brigade reconnaissance squadron; belonging to the 11th Airmobile Brigade stationed at the Oranje barracks in Schaarsbergen. This unit, which originated from 103 Reconnaissance Squadron and the Pathfinder Platoon 'Madju' 11AMB (Garderegiment Grenadiers en Jagers), has been part of 11 Air Manoeuvre Brigade (Air Assault) since 2015 and can be deployed by helicopter and parachute. They operate both on foot and mounted.

104 JISTARC Reconnaissance Squadron; belonging to the Joint ISTAR Commando stationed at the Tonnetkazerne in 't Harde.
