= 103rd ISTAR Battalion =

103 Battalion
- Active: 2003–2011
- Country: Netherlands
- Branch: Cavalry
- Role: Reconnaissance
- Part of: Regiment Huzaren van Boreel
- Garrison/HQ: Legerplaats bij Oldebroek, Luitenant Kolonel Tonnet Kazerne

103 NLD ISTAR Battalion was the intelligence gathering reconnaissance battalion of the Royal Netherlands Army, tasked with Intelligence Surveillance Target Acquisition and Reconnaissance (ISTAR). The battalion was the main part of the Regiment Huzaren van Boreel (Boreel's Hussars). The other parts of the regiment are the independent recce squadrons which are part of the Netherlands' Army's Mechanised Brigades. 101 RPV bt and 101 Art Spt Bt belongs to the Field Artillery Regiment and 102 EW Coy to Signals Regiment.

In 2011, 103 (NLD) ISTAR Bn was amalgamated with Air Force, Navy and Military Police intelligence assets into (NLD) Joint ISTAR Command (JISTARC). The JISTARC is a joint unit under direction of COM (NLD) Land Forces.

== History ==
The battalion's tasking was centred on collecting and analysing operational information, then use it to compile intelligence and advice for operational commanders. Other taskings are diverse and include Forward Air Control; FOO; Route reconnaissance; security operations; electronic and SIGINT.

103 ISTAR-battalion had a complement of little over 800 personnel and is stationed at Legerplaats bij Oldebroek and the Lieutenant Kolonel Tonnet Kazerne in 't Harde in the Veluwe area of the Netherlands.

The minister of defence decided to found the ISTAR battalion at June 25, 2001. After preparations the Chief of the General Staff of the Royal Netherlands Army formally raised the unit at June 25, 2003. He then also decided to formally place the unit under the administration of Boreel's Hussars. The battalion continues the traditions of the old 103 Recce Battalion, which was also part of the same regiment. After World War II Dutch Cavalry units became known as battalions, though they still retained a Regimental identity. Boreel's Hussars even became a multi-battalion regiment (almost in an infantry style) housing all the Army's armoured reconnaissance and light cavalry units. It continues to do so today.

== Subunits ==
103 ISTAR Bn contained the following sub-units:

- Battalion staff
- 101 Military Intelligence and HQ and Staff squadron
- 101 RPV Bt (Unmanned Aerial Systems)
- 101 Artillery Support Battery (a Target Acquisition Radar unit)
- 102 EW Company (a Signals sub unit)
- 103 LIRS (Long Range Intelligence, Surveillance, Reconnaissance)
- 104 LIRS

The battalion was part of the Operational Support Command Land (Operationeel Ondersteunings Commando Land, OOCL), a formation also containing several specialist engineer units, medical units and such which support the manoeuvre brigades of the army.
