= Intelligence, surveillance, target acquisition, and reconnaissance =

Military doctrinal concept

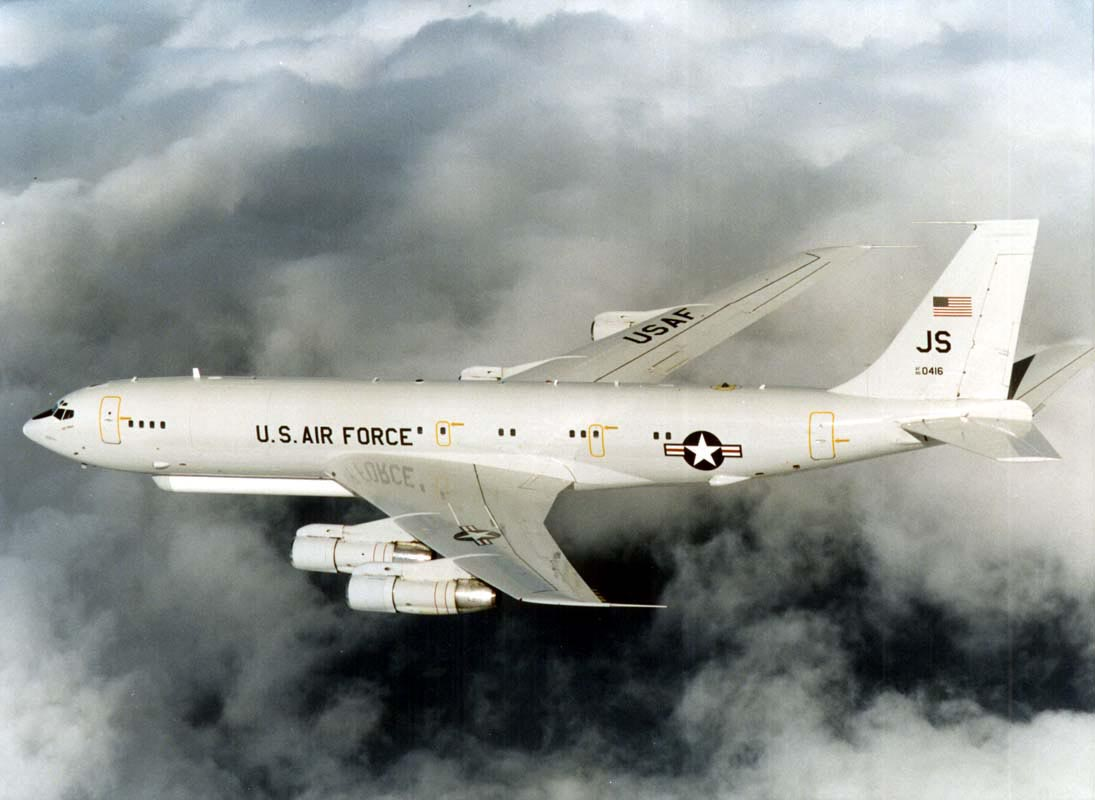
A Joint Surveillance Target Attack Radar System (JSTARS)

ISTAR (Intelligence, Surveillance, Target Acquisition, and Reconnaissance) is a practice that links several battlefield functions together to assist a combat force in employing its sensors and managing the information they gather.

== ISR (Intelligence, surveillance and reconnaissance) ==
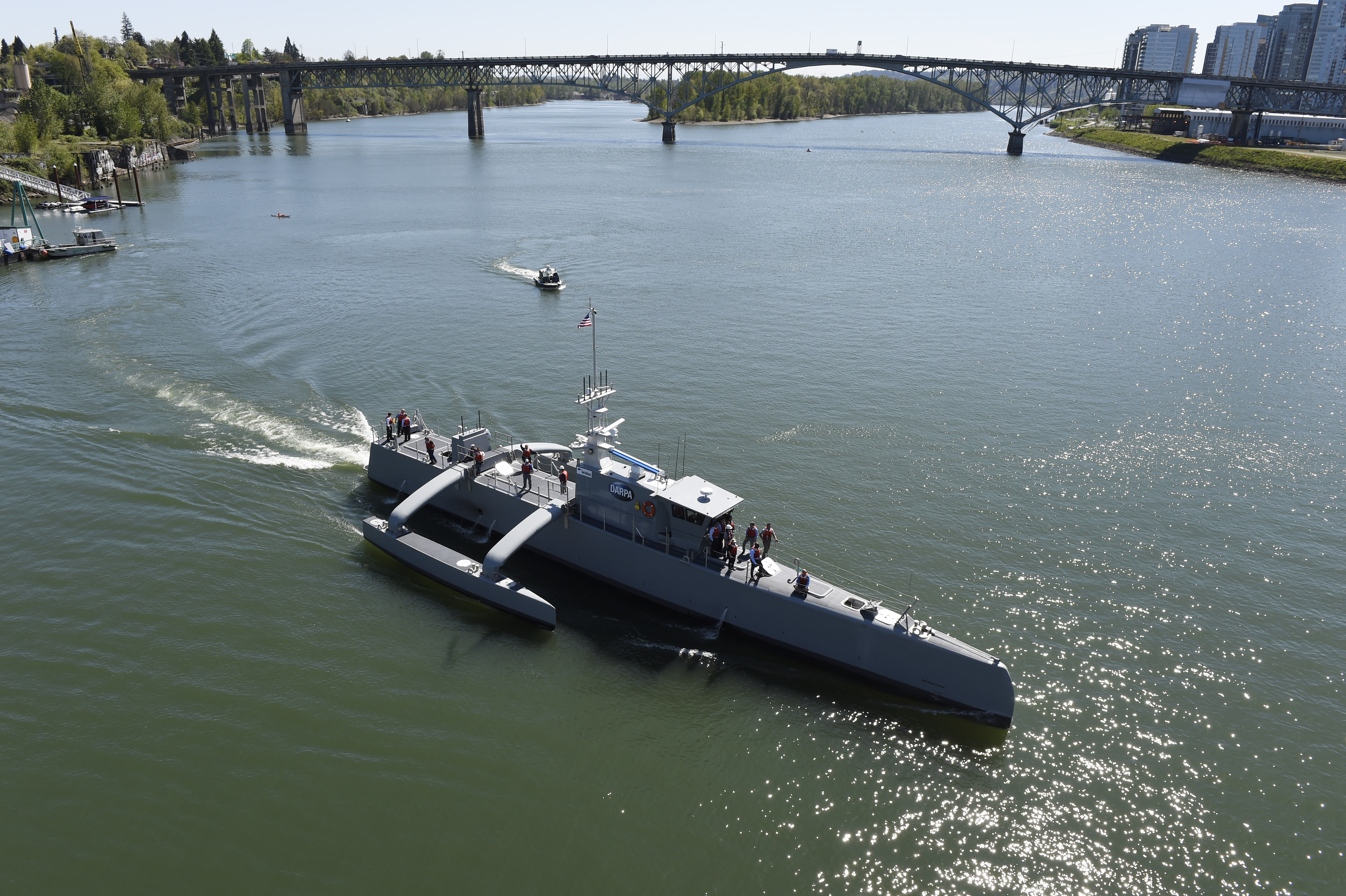
USNS Sea Hunter, an uncrewed ocean-going surface vessel, (Note: In 2022 Sea Hunter and three other uncrewed surface vessels participated in RIMPAC, which caused requests for additional command and control capabilities for them in naval operations.) is suited for freedom of navigation operations (FONOPS).

ISR is the coordinated and integrated acquisition, processing and provision of timely, accurate, relevant, coherent and assured information and intelligence to support commanders' conduct of activities. Land, sea, air and space platforms have critical ISR roles in supporting operations in general. By massing ISR assets, an improved clarity and depth of knowledge can be established. ISR encompasses multiple activities related to the planning and operation of systems that collect, process, and disseminate data in support of current and future military operations.

In July 2021 the NDAA budget markup by the House Armed Services Committee sought to retain ISR resources such as the RQ-4 Global Hawk, the E-8 Joint Surveillance Radar and Attack System (JSTARS) which the Air Force is seeking to divest. Examples of ISR systems include surveillance and reconnaissance systems ranging from satellites, to crewed aircraft such as the U-2, to uncrewed aircraft systems (UAS) such as the US Air Force's Global Hawk and Predator and the US Army's Hunter and PSST Aerostats, to uncrewed ocean-going vessels, to other ground-, air-, sea-, or space-based equipment, to human intelligence teams, or to AI-based ISR systems.

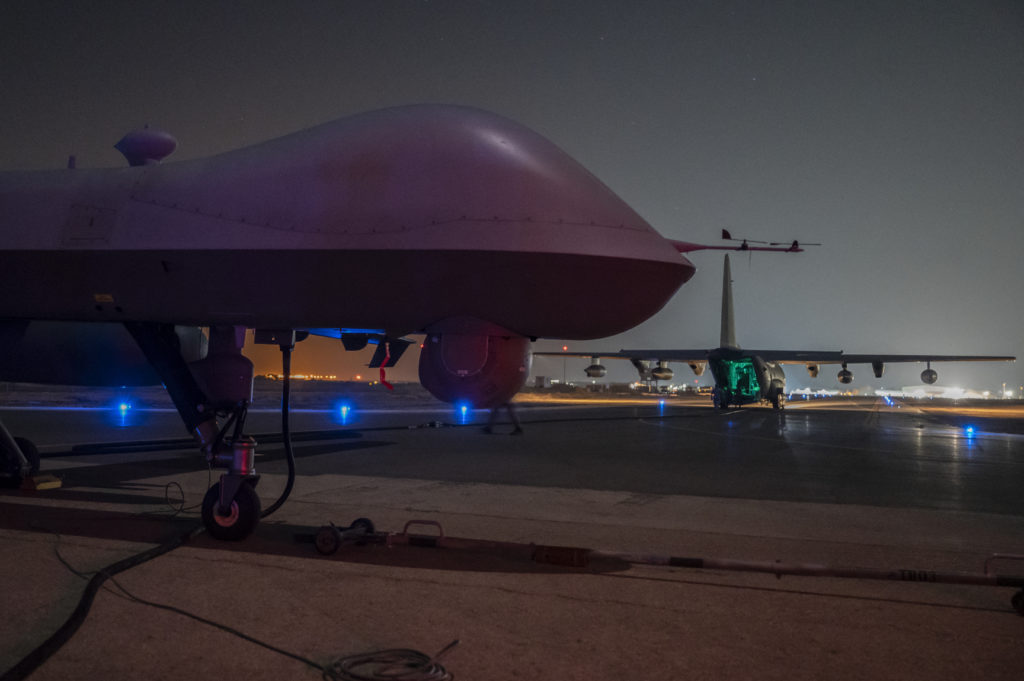
A MQ-9 Reaper at a FARP (forward area refueling point)

The intelligence data provided by these ISR systems can take many forms, including optical, radar, or infrared images or electronic signals. Effective ISR data can provide early warning of enemy threats as well as enable military forces to increase effectiveness, coordination, and lethality, and demand for ISR capabilities to support ongoing military operations has increased. In December 2021, the US Navy began testing the usefulness and effectiveness of uncrewed "saildrones" at recognizing targets of interest on the high seas.

For space-based targeting sensors, in a 2019 Broad Agency Announcement, the US government defined ISR in this case as "a capability for gathering data and information on an object or in an area of interest (AOI) on a persistent, event-driven, or scheduled basis using imagery, signals, and other collection methods. This includes warning (to include ballistic missile activity), targeting analysis, threat capability assessment, situational awareness, battle damage assessment (BDA), and characterization of the operational environment." Persistence was described: "Persistent access provides predictable coverage of an area of interest (AOI). Most space-based intelligence collection capabilities consist of multiple satellites operating in concert, or supplemented by other sensors, when continuous surveillance of an area is desired. Persistent sensors must provide sufficient surveillance revisit timelines to support a weapon strike at any time."

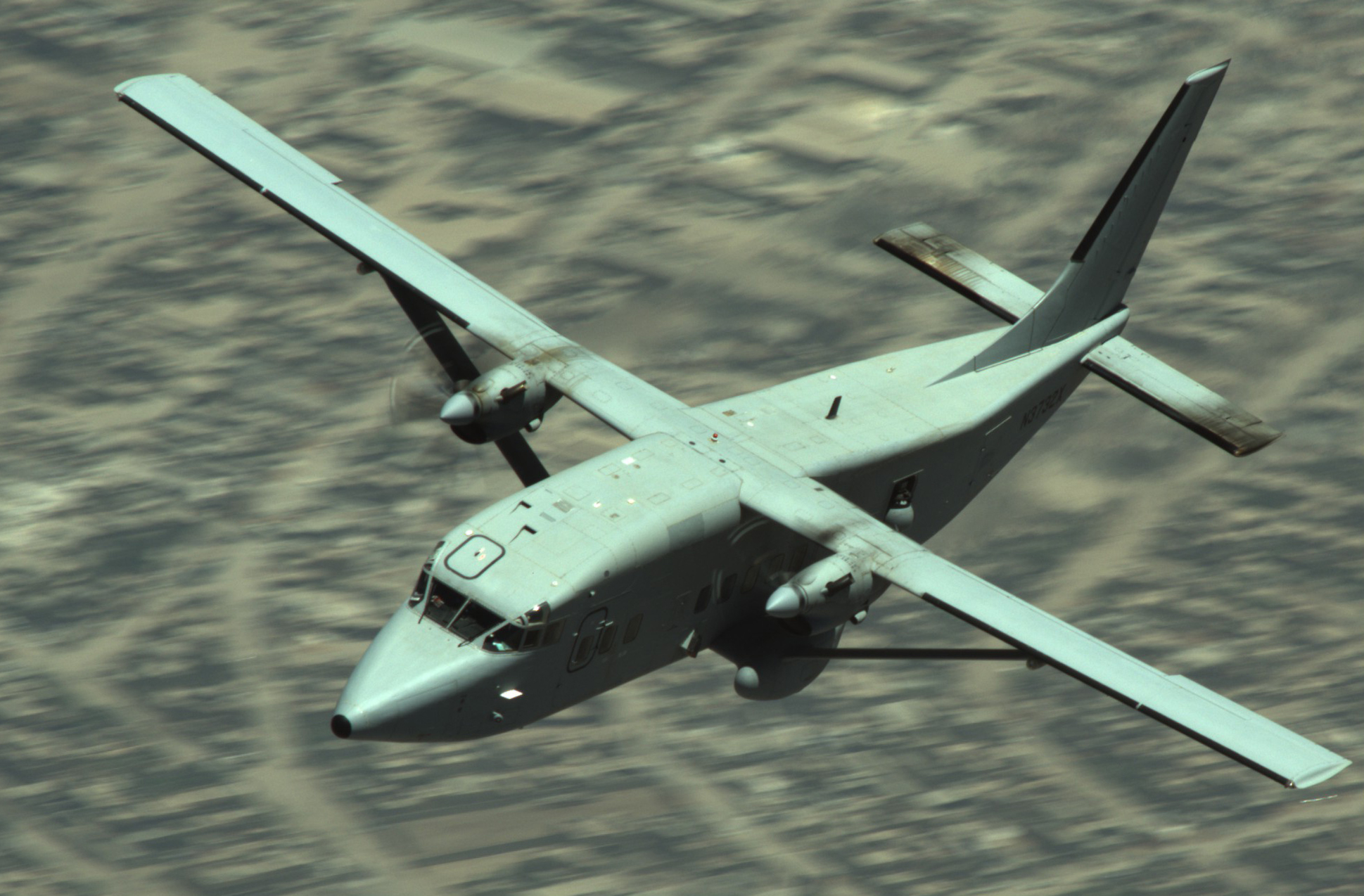
A C-23 operating performing a Constant Hawk role over Iraq

The United States Space Force, National Reconnaissance Office (NRO), and National Geospatial-Intelligence Agency (NGA) share the satellite-based ISR task as of 2021. See Space Delta 7

From 2018, the NGA has used Data transformation services (DTS), to convert raw sensor data into a format usable by its mission partners, who are government agencies whose names are classified. In light of the 2022 Russian invasion of Ukraine, the NGA has taken operational control of DoD's Project Maven, the AI ISR project for area defense, to identify point targets for ISR.

The NGA uses OREN, the Odyssey GEOINT Edge Node for National System for Geospatial Intelligence, or NGS. The Joint Regional Edge Node (JREN) is on-deck for distributing nearly a petabyte to the Combatant Commands in the next year, for 2023, an increase by a factor of 10.

NRO "has a proven track record in [ISR]", insists one of the founders of the US Space Force, who defends the capability of the NRO over the ambition of the Space Force to take over the role of ISR. GMTI (ground moving target indicator) data is an objective for Space Force, NGA, and NRO.

ISR at platoon level

In July 2022, Junior (3rd year) and Senior (4th year) cadets at West Point had hands-on experience building and using drones with various tactical capabilities, guided by faculty from the Electrical Engineering and Computer Science departments in tactical applications during Cadet Leadership Development Training .

Ukraine's soldiers are using FPV drones on the battlefield, armed with munitions.

ISR concepts are also associated with certain intelligence units, for instance Task Force ODIN, ISR TF (Company+) in Bosnia, Kosovo and Afghanistan.

Commercial ISR

In light of the 2022 Russian invasion of Ukraine, commercial satellite imagery is being used to track troop movements, broadcast world events in real time, and conduct war.—NHK World-Japan

== ISTAR ==
Intelligence is collected on the battlefield through systematic observation by deployed soldiers and a variety of electronic sensors. Reconnaissance and surveillance are methods of obtaining this information. Target acquisition involves taking the collected information and applying it to sensors to direct effect and maintain awareness of a specified entity, often to enable gathering further information. The information is then passed to intelligence personnel for analysis, and then to the commander and their staff for the formulation of battle plans. Intelligence is processed information that is relevant and contributes to an understanding of the ground, and of enemy dispositions and intents. Intelligence failures can happen.

ISTAR is the process of integrating the intelligence process with surveillance, target acquisition and reconnaissance tasks in order to improve a commander's situational awareness and consequently their decision making. The inclusion of the "I" is important as it recognizes the importance of taking the information from all the sensors and processing it into useful knowledge.

ISTAR can also refer to:

- a unit or sub unit with ISTAR as a task (e.g.: an ISTAR squadron)
- equipment required to support the task

== Variations of ISTAR ==
There are several variations on the "ISTAR" acronym. Some variations reflect specific emphasis on certain aspects of ISTAR.

=== Surveillance, target acquisition, and reconnaissance (STAR) ===
A term used when emphasis is to be placed on the sensing component of ISTAR.

=== Reconnaissance, surveillance and target acquisition (RSTA) ===
RSTA is used by the US Army in place of STAR or ISTAR. Also, a term used to identify certain US Army units: for instance, 3rd Squadron, 153rd RSTA. These units serve a similar role to the below mentioned US Marine Corps STA platoons, but on a larger scale.

=== Surveillance and target acquisition (STA) ===
Used to designate one of the following:

- A US Military Occupational Specialty (MOS) - specifically a STA United States Marine Corps Scout Sniper
- The role of a unit (e.g. STA patrol) or equipment
- A doctrine similar to ISTAR; for the US, and its allies and partners, its basis is the US National Defense Space Architecture (NDSA) as realized by layered constellations of Earth satellites and Earth stations

== ISTAR units and formations ==
- Space Delta 7 (U.S. Space Force)
- Reconnaissance Surveillance and Target Acquisition (RSTA) Units (U.S. Army)
- Long-Range Surveillance (LRS) Units (U.S. Army)
- Northrop Grumman E-8 Joint STARS, Raytheon Sentinel, Alliance Ground Surveillance Aircraft
- Sayeret Matkal (Israeli Army)
- Shaldag Unit (Israeli Air Force)
- Brigade de renseignement (French Army)
- 2nd Hussar regiment ( French army )
- 61st artillery regiment ( French army )
- 54th signal regiment ( French army )
- 13th Parachute Dragoon Regiment (French Army)
- [Intelligence battalion Norwegian Army)
- Jegerkompaniet (Norwegian Army)
- Kystjegerkommandoen (Norwegian Coastal Ranger Command)
- Artillerijeger (Norwegian Army)
- Garnisonen i Sør-Varanger (Borderguard, Norwegian Army)
- ISTAR battalion (Norwegian Army)
- ISTAR HQ platoon (Norwegian Army)
- Joint ISTAR Command (Dutch Army)
- 103 ISTAR battalion (Dutch Army)
- Cavalry Corps (Irish Army)
- Jagers te Paard Battalion (Belgian Army)
- ISTAR Battalion (Portuguese Army)
- NBG ISTAR TF (EU Nordic Battle Group)
- ISTAR (Canadian Army)
- 62nd Svarzochna Brigada (Bulgarian Armed Forces)
- Särskilda Inhämtningsgruppen (SIG) (Swedish Armed Forces)
- 61 Special Reconnaissance Regiment (Jordan Royal Guard, Jordanian Armed Forces)
- Strategic Reconnaissance Company (28th Ranger Brigade, Jordanian Armed Forces)
- Acquisition and Survey Regiment (Jordanian Armed Forces)
- Special Support & Reconnaissance Company - SSR (Danish Defence)
- ISTAR Bat TF 11 ad hoc] (Swiss Armed Forces)
- 350. military intelligence battalion ( 350. vojnoobavještajna bojna ) (Croatian Army)
- Razuznavacki bataljon na ARM, Republika Severna Makedonija
- 5. obveščevalno-izvidniški bataljon, 5th Intelligence-Reconnaissance Btn, Military of Slovenia
- ISTAR battalion (Slovak army)
- Regimiento de Inteligencia 1 (1st Intelligence Regiment, Spanish Army)
- 32nd Regiment Royal Artillery UAS Regiment (British Army)
- 47th Regiment Royal Artillery UAS Regiment (British Army)
- 30 Commando Information Exploitation Group (Royal Marines)
- 21 SAS and 23 SAS (British Army), now part of 1st Intelligence, Surveillance and Reconnaissance Brigade
- Special Reconnaissance Regiment (British Army)
- Honourable Artillery Company (British Army)
- Surveillance, Reconnaissance, Intelligence Group (SRIG) U.S. Marine Corps
- STA Sniper U.S. Marine Corps
- 6th Brigade (Australia)
- Intelligence Center (Croatian: Središnjica za obavještajno djelovanje) (Croatia)
- Fernspäher (German Bundeswehr)
- Meritiedustelupataljoona (Coastal Brigade, Finnish Defence Forces)

== See also ==
- After-action review
- Battlefield surveillance brigades in the United States Army
- C^{4}ISTAR, a broader concept that also includes Command, Control, Communications and Computers.
- CARVER matrix
- Kill chain
- Sentient (intelligence analysis system)
