= Jules Ferry laws =

Set of French laws in 1881

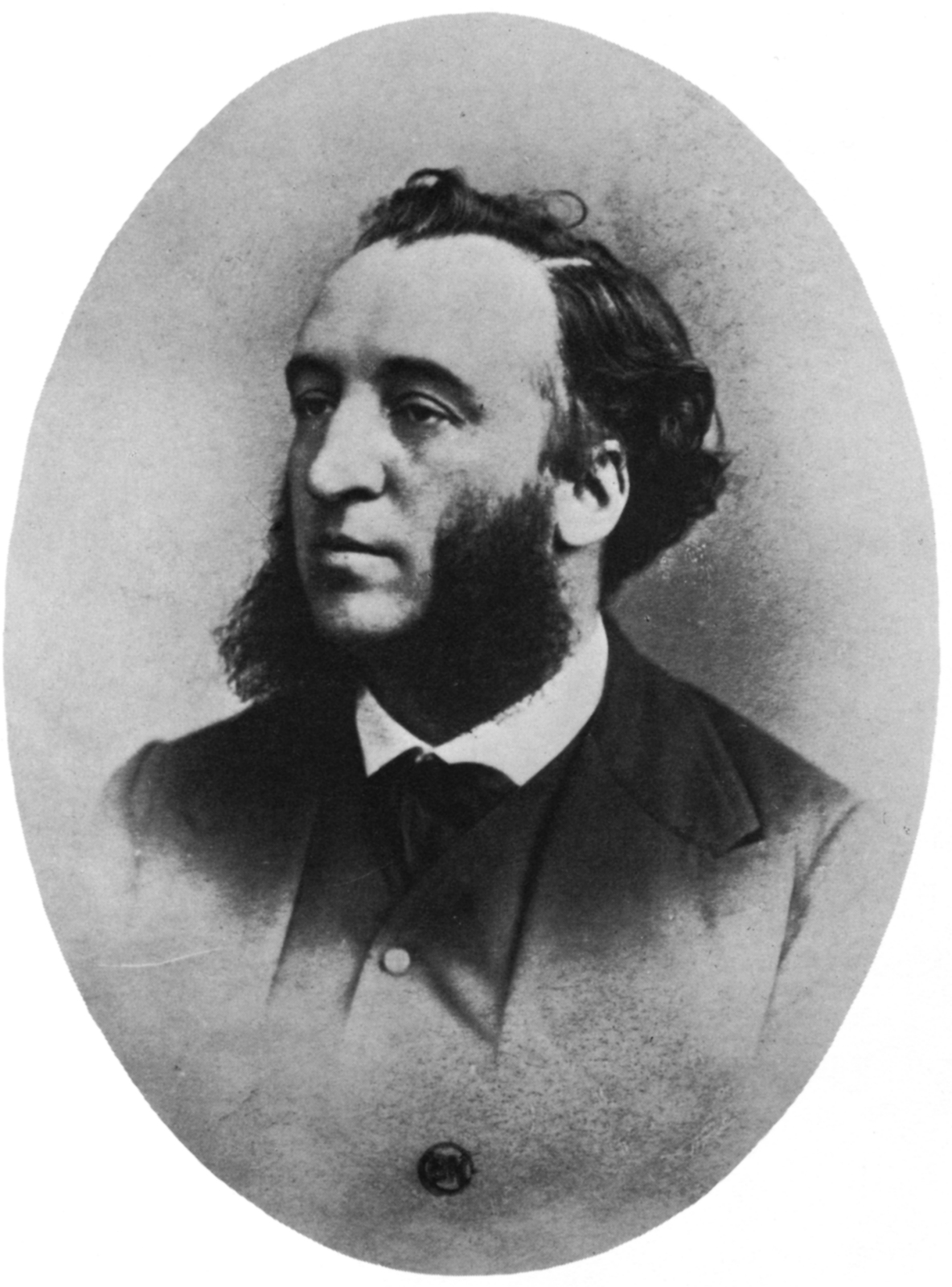
Jules Ferry.

The Jules Ferry laws are a set of French laws which established free education in 1881, then mandatory and laic (secular) education in 1882. Jules Ferry, a lawyer holding the office of Minister of Public Instruction in the 1880s, is widely credited for creating the modern Republican school (l'école républicaine). The dual system of state and church schools that were largely staffed by religious officials was replaced by state schools and lay school teachers. The educational reforms enacted by Jules Ferry are often attributed to a broader anti-clerical campaign in France.

== History ==
French education during the 19th century was marked by two distinct and segregated systems, the first being a secondary school system and the second a primary school system. However, in each of these systems, the Catholic Church provided an alternative to secular schooling that was often the only option for families in economically depressed regions of France.

Although the Republican party is often credited for inventing the concept of free primary school, it was, in fact, a series of progressive improvements since mid-century. For example, in 1698, it was decreed that children ages 7–14 were to attend local Catholic schools with certified instructors, which were also added to areas that previously had none. However, funds for these schools were to be provided by local residents, and it proved very difficult for these schools to afford to remain in practice. Overall, between 1837 (44 years before the Jules Ferry Laws were passed) and 1906, the number of schools had increased by more than 100%. In some areas, like Bretagne Ouest, it reached nearly 200% (197.2%).

The idea of national government support for popular education and teacher training first became apparent as an important social and political issue during the French Revolution of 1789. Prominent politicians, such as Talleyrand and Condorcet, each proposed a national system of education that would provide every citizen with basic primary education. With the intention of strengthening France's politics and armed forces, a growing concentration on higher education was later seen after the Revolution, notably from Napoleon I in his establishment of the Imperial University in 1804-8. Meanwhile, the Catholic Church still remained highly involved within primary education. The Guizot Act passed in 1833 obliged all communes to open boys’ schools. The Falloux Act of 15 March 1850 abolished teacher training programs for men which had been put in place by the Guizot Law. These laws created a mixed system in which some primary education establishments were public and controlled by the state and others were under the supervision of Catholic congregations. Although the concept of universal public schooling was important to these revolutionaries, it became clear that financial issues and political debate thwarted the implementation.

== Philosophy ==
Despite the differences on economic, social, and other issues among the Republican radicals with whom Jules Ferry identified, they were united by the desire to obtain a secular republic due to the growing popularity of anti-clericalism since the Revolution and notably during the Third Republic. In the wake of the Industrial Revolution and its new practices of employment and work days, the radicals also "hoped that schooling would make workers as reasonable and self-satisfied as it was credited with making the bourgeoisie."

The 1898 attempt would not have held sway with the Republican radicals of Ferry's generation, who would have seen it as Catholic propaganda and as a defense against the growing popularity of Protestantism. Likewise, Napoleon's Imperial University remained connected to the Church and paid little heed to primary education that would ensure basic literacy needs among the larger population. In Ferry's view, schools would educate on political doctrine and the virtues of nationalism, emphasizing independent thought.

Members of Catholic orders were not allowed to teach in public schools after a five-year transitional period.

== Laws of 1881 ==
On 16 June 1881 the first set of Jules Ferry Laws were passed, making primary education free for both boys and girls. To finance of the project, the communes and departments had the responsibility to subsidize it. Additionally, the laws protected the wages of teachers by mandating that "salaries... may never under any circumstances become inferior to the salaries they have enjoyed during the three years preceding the application of the present law..." (Art. 6).

== Laws of 1882 ==
=== Article 1 ===
This article outlines what is to be included in a free, mandatory, and lay education system.

Primary education includes:

The moral and civic education;

Reading and writing;

The language and elements of French literature;

Geography, particularly that of France;

History, particularly that of France to the present;

Basic lessons on law and political economy;

The elements of the natural sciences and mathematics, and their applications to agriculture, hygiene, industrial arts, handicrafts and use the tools of the principal occupations;

The elements of drawing, modeling and music;

Gymnastics;

For boys, military exercises;

For girls, needlework.

Article 23 of the Falloux Act (the Act of 15 March 1850) is repealed.

=== Article 2 ===
This article regulates the option of a religious education, which differs between public and private institutions.

The public primary schools will hold one day free, apart from Sunday, allowing parents to give, if they wish, their children a religious education outside from school buildings. Religious education is optional in private schools.

=== Article 3 ===
This article discusses further annulment of portions of the Falloux Act regarding religious authority.

The measures of sections 18 and 44 of the Act of 15 March 1850 are repealed, in that they gave ministers of religion a right of inspection, supervision and management in public and private elementary schools and in the kindergartens (salle d’asile), as well as paragraph 2 of Article 31 of the Act, which gives consistories the right to present teacher candidates belonging to non-Catholic faiths.

=== Article 4 ===
This article makes compulsory primary education and lays down the requirements of age and manner of instruction (whether they will be schooled in the home or at a public or private institution).

Primary education is compulsory for children of both sexes between the ages of six to thirteen years and may be given either in institutions of primary or secondary schools, in public or free schools, or in the home, by the father himself or anyone he chooses.

A regulation will determine the means of ensuring primary education for deaf, mute, and blind.

=== Article 5 ===
This article explains the formation of school boards, national representation in Paris and Lyon, and the terms of office of the members. A stratification of responsibility begins to take shape: first, parents were to have the primary responsibility over the education of their children. Mayors, then, as presidents of the local school boards, were to oversee that parents followed through with this responsibility. To oversee the school board, therefore, was the central government (see Article 7 below). This now removes church officials from these positions.

A municipal school board is established in each commune to monitor and encourage school attendance. It consists of the mayor, president; a cantonal delegate and, in common with several townships, as many delegates as there are townships, designated by the school inspector; with members appointed by the department council in equal numbers, at most, to one third of the members of this council. In Paris and Lyon, there is a school board for each municipal district. It is chaired, in Paris, by the mayor, in Lyon, by assistants; it is composed of one delegate appointed by the cantonal inspector of schools, with members appointed by the council, numbering three to seven by each district. The term of office of members of the school board, appointed by the council under the second paragraph, lasts until the election of a new municipal council. Their terms will always renewable. The primary inspector is ex officio member of all school boards established within his jurisdiction.

=== Article 6 ===
This article discusses the graduation of students after they have completed the appropriate amount of primary education, determined by a public examination.

There shall be established a certificate of primary studies; it is awarded after a public examination which may be presented to children beginning from the age of eleven. Those who, from that age, have obtained the certificate of primary studies, will be exempt from remaining compulsory school time.

=== Article 7 ===
This article discusses the compulsory requirements of the parents or guardians of each child in procuring an education, whether private or public.

The father, guardian, person having custody of the child, the boss with whom the child is placed, shall, at least fifteen days before the time classes begin, advise the mayor of the town if the child is to be given education in the family or in a public or private school; in the latter two cases, he will indicate the chosen school.

The families living near to two or more public schools have the option to enroll their children in either of these schools, whether within or outside the territory of their commune, unless they already have the maximum number of students permitted by the regulations.

In case of dispute, and by request of either the mayor or the parents, the department council rules as the last resort.

=== Article 8 ===
This article discusses further requirements of the parents or guardians in maintaining their child’s attendance, regulated by the student records kept by the municipal school boards.

Each year the mayor shall prepare, in consultation with the municipal school board, the list of all children aged between six and thirteen years and is to notify those persons who are responsible for these children at the time classes begin.

Failure to register, fifteen days before the beginning of school, on the part of parents and other responsible persons, allows him to automatically register the child in a public school and notify the person responsible.

Eight days before classes begin, he gives to the directors of public and private schools the list of children who will attend their schools.

A duplicate of these lists is sent by him to the primary inspector.

=== Article 9 ===
This article discusses the procedures for changing schools and/or the manner in which education is received.

When a child leaves school, parents or persons responsible must immediately give notice to the mayor and indicate how the child will receive instruction in the future.

The school inspector invites those responsible for the child to comply with the law and makes them aware of the provisions of Article 12 below.

=== Article 10 ===
This article outlines policy regarding school absences.

When a child misses school temporarily, parents or persons responsible should inform the director or the directress the reasons for this absence.

The directors and directresses must keep a register of attendance that notes, for each class, the absences of the students. At the end of each month, they will address to the mayor and the primary inspector a copy of the register, indicating the number of absences and reasons.

The reasons for absence will be submitted to the school board. The only known legitimate reasons are: child's illness, death of a family member, incapacity resulting from accidental difficulty of communications. The exceptional circumstances invoked will be taken into consideration by the school board.

=== Article 11 ===
This article discusses penalties against a school director in the failure to abide by the preceding article.

Any private school director who will have not complied with the requirements of the preceding article shall, on the report of the school board and primary inspector, remand to the county council.

The county council may impose the following penalties: 1) warning; 2) censorship; 3) suspension for not more than one month and in case of recurrence in the school year, for not more than three months.

=== Article 12 ===
This article discusses the parent or guardian’s duty in the situation of excessive absences of their child.

When a child is absent from school four times a month for at least half a day without justification accepted by the school board, the father, guardian or responsible person will be invited at least three days in advance to appear in the municipal hall, before the National Commission, which will remind him the text of the law and explain his duty.

In case of failure to appear without accepted justification, the school board will apply the penalty set out in the following article.

=== Article 13 ===
This article discusses repeated occurrences of the preceding offenses.

In cases of recurrence within twelve months after the first offense, the municipal school board shall order the posting for fifteen days or a month, at the door of city hall, the surnames, first names, and qualifications of the person responsible, stating the offense made out against the person.

The same shall apply to persons who have not complied with the requirements of Article 9.

=== Article 14 ===
This article discusses, in further offense of excessive absence, legal proceedings to be administered.

In case of further offense, the school board, or, in its stead, the inspector, should address a complaint to the justice of the peace.

The offense will be considered as a contravention resulting in penalties by the police in accordance with Articles 479, 480 and the following of the Penal Code.

Section 463 of the same code is applicable.

=== Article 15 ===
This article discusses the procedures for excusing a child’s absence, including the case of a child’s industrial or agricultural labor.

The school board may grant to children living with their parents or guardians, when they make a reasoned request, exemptions from school attendance that may not exceed three months per year except holidays.

These exemptions should, if they exceed fifteen days, be subject to the approval of the primary inspector.

These provisions do not apply to children who accompany their parents or guardians when they absent themselves temporarily from the town.

In this case, a notice given verbally or in writing to the mayor or the teacher will suffice.

The school board may also, with the approval of the department council, exempt children employed in industry, once arrived at the age of apprenticeship, of one of the two classes of the day; the same opportunity will be given to all children employed, outside their families, in agriculture.

=== Article 16 ===
This article discusses the assessment of students instructed by their families through public examinations.

Children who receive instruction in the family, must, each year, by the end of the second year of compulsory education, take an examination which will focus on matters of education for their age in public schools according to the following forms and programs that will be determined by ministerial orders made in the High Council.

The Examination Board shall consist of: the primary inspector or his delegate, president; a cantonal delegate; a person holding a university degree or a certificate of competency; the judges will be selected by the school inspector.

In examining the girls, the certificated person shall be a woman.

If examination of the child is considered inadequate and no excuse is accepted by the jury, parents are required to send their child to a public or private school within a week of notification or to inform the mayor what school they have chosen.

In failure of reporting, registration will take place automatically, as stated in Article 8.

=== Article 17 ===
This article addresses school funding provided by the laws passed on 10 April 1867 by Victor Duruy.

The school fund, established by Article 15 of the Act of 10 April 1867, will be established in all communes.

In communes where the subsidy does not exceed 30 francs, the fund will be entitled, on the appropriation for this purpose at the Ministry of Education, a grant at least equal to the amount of municipal subsidies.

The distribution of relief will be under the responsibility of the school board.

=== Article 18 ===
This article addresses the results of the failure of a school or schools within a commune to comply with Article 4; mandating compulsory primary education.

Ministerial orders, made at the request of the school inspectors and department councils, will determine each year the commune where, as a result of inadequate school facilities, the requirements of Articles 4 and following the obligation could not be enforced.

An annual report, sent to the Congress by the Minister of Education, will give the list of communes to which this section has been applied.

== See also ==
- French School Wars
- First Schools' War, an attempt to introduce secularist education in Belgium in 1879
- First Textbook War, an attempt to introduce secularist education in France in 1882
- Education in France
- History of education in France
- Kulturkampf

== Related articles ==
- Normal schools in France
