= First Textbook War =

Education-related conflict in France between 1882 and 1883

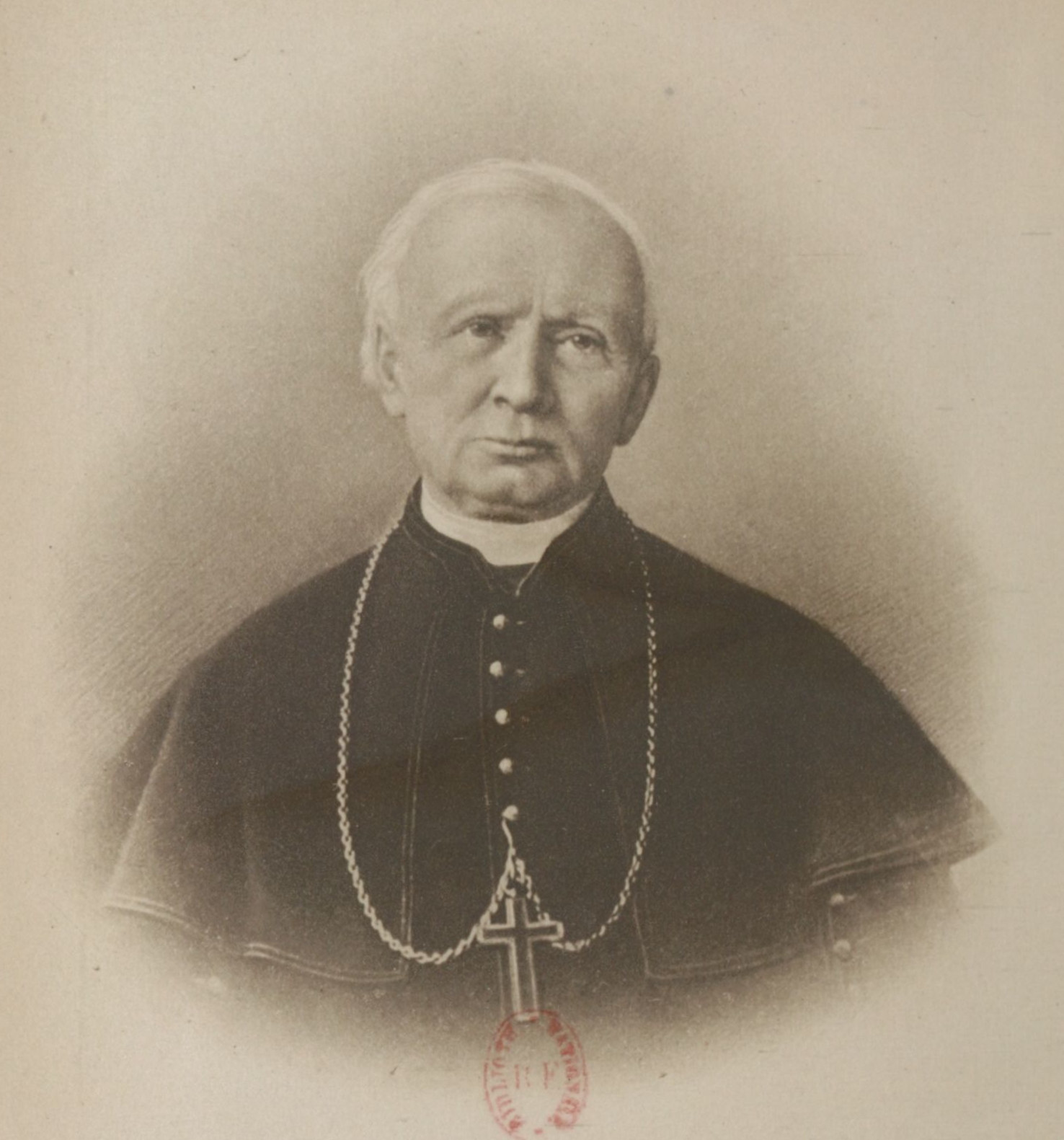
Mgr. Isoard, Bishop of Annecy, is one of the main protagonists in the "Textbook War".

The first Textbook War was an education-related conflict in France between 1882 and 1883, after the secularization of primary education materials by the Ferry law on March 28, 1882.

The conflict focused on four civics textbooks designated for use in the recently established secular school system. These books were accused of promoting moral relativism, disregarding the principle of school neutrality, and presenting an unfavorable image of the Catholic Church. During this controversy, the Church aimed to launch a defense campaign against the Ferry Law. This law eliminated the catechism from schools and substituted it with "moral and civic instruction" classes detailed in article 1 of elementary school curricula.

The so-called "textbook war" led to a national-level conflict between the government, prefects, and the French episcopate, and a local-level dispute between specific priests, teachers, and mayors. On the part of the Catholic clergy, it resulted in the confiscation of secular morality books and refusal of sacraments to urge the faithful to pull their children out of "unfavorable schools". The Ministry of Religious Affairs utilized the Concordat of 1801 to halt the salaries of the most obstinate clerics.

However, the tensions were not universal throughout France and decreased with Jules Ferry's return to the presidency of the Conseil, together with the appeasement of Pope Leo XIII and the more moderate bishops. Thus, the "first textbook war" differed from the much more severe "second textbook war" that occurred twenty-five years later during the 1907-1914 school war.

== Context ==
=== From the Guizot law to the Ferry laws ===
Since 1833, the Guizot law has regulated primary public education. Schoolchildren received an education that included moral and religious instruction under the aegis of the State, the communes, and the Church, each with its own prerogatives.

However, the advent of the Third Republic quickly disrupted this state of affairs. In fact, the Republic was largely constructed in opposition to the Catholic Church, which was politically aligned with the Legitimist and Bonapartist movements. The constitutional laws enacted in 1875 and the resolution of the crisis on May 16, 1877, in favor of the Republicans established the regime. On May 4, 1877, Gambetta identified the Catholic Church as the adversary to be defeated.

"You therefore feel, you therefore admit, that there is something which, on a par with the Ancien Régime, is repugnant to this country, repugnant to the peasants of France [...] It is the domination of clericalism [...] I am merely translating the intimate feelings of the people of France by saying of clericalism what my friend Peyrat once said of it: clericalism? That's the enemy."

The struggle against clericalism served as a driving force and a unifying element for the Republicans. Consequently, the implementation of the anticlerical policy gained traction, beginning with the initial expulsion of congregations in 1880.

Subsequently, the Jules Ferry laws addressed the issue of education. The 1881 law, which mandated primary education for all and made it free, helped to extend educational opportunities to all social classes and to mitigate child labor. As for the 1882 law, it secularized the primary education content in public schools. The teaching staff was only secularized four years later with the Goblet law.

=== Other aspects of the school issue ===
As the conflict occurred alongside the introduction of several secular anti-clerical laws, it cannot be solely attributed to school textbooks. The textbooks represent the culmination of a broader struggle that addressed various concerns, including curricula, textbooks, teaching staff and their status, premises, and more. The significance of this opposition is the result of its diversity and intensity. The diversity and intensity of this opposition left a lasting impact on the memory of French society. The term "textbook war" was seldom used by the quarrel's protagonists, who viewed the controversial textbooks as a mere pretext for a larger struggle revolving around the school and ultimately, the political system of the Republic. Civic education emphasizes a nationwide narrative glorifying the French Revolution as the pinnacle of the Third Republic's virtues. In the 19th century, the distribution of Abbé Loriquet's Histoire de France à l'usage de la jeunesse in Catholic institutions caused controversy between legitimists and liberals regarding the portrayal of Napoleon Bonaparte.

Ultimately, conflicts over school books cannot simply be reduced to a dichotomy between two educational systems, as they also reflect larger trends in political life. Set against a backdrop of national and international events, textbooks reflect complex currents of thought that blend religious convictions with the political and social opinions of a country marked by the defeat in 1871. Beyond the emergence of secular morality, the use of textbooks in elementary schools to instill patriotic spirits in younger generations also pits proponents of teaching the cult of fatherland and national values against advocates of pacifism.

== Development ==
=== Beginnings of the conflict ===
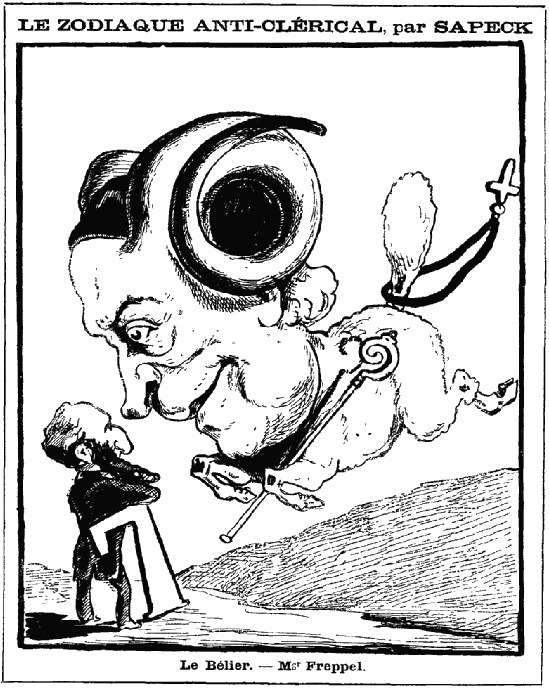
Anticlerical cartoon from 1881 depicting Mgr. Freppel confronting Jules Ferry.

From the beginning, the Catholic right strongly opposed the Ferry laws. Mgr. Freppel, who was the bishop of Angers and a member of parliament for Finistère, spoke out against state-run education in the Chamber of Deputies. He believed that it was "useless, ineffective, and tended towards state socialism". Similarly, Louis Veuillot's L'Univers, led conservative press denounced the "school revolution" brought about by these "scurrilous laws," which resulted in the January 11, 1883 decree condemning the four textbooks. The crisis was triggered and the controversy reignited by the practical application of the March 28, 1882 law. As a result, civic instruction textbooks were drafted, replacing those on religious morality. In the late 19th century, some writers associated with the free-thinking movement expressed anti-Catholic views.

Political scientist Yves Déloye reports that the controversy over textbooks began in late December 1879, when Deputy Paul Bert (Note: Paul Bert was a Radical Party deputy who had been a member of the far-left parliamentary group since 1872, and was not yet Minister of Public Instruction and Religious Affairs in the Léon Gambetta government (he would become Minister in November 1881). The preparatory work for the Jules Ferry laws is due to him, but his name has been eclipsed in favor of the latter, who succeeded him at the Ministry of Public Instruction and Religious Affairs in two longer mandates (see Histoire de laïcité en France#Paul Bert).) presented a report on primary education reform to the Chamber of Deputies, as per Jules Ferry's request. In his view, future citizens should have the ability to attain "all basic knowledge in the field of positive sciences, devoid of any religious presumptions or dogmatic instruction." A textbook authored by the same Paul Bert - and suggested as an addendum to republican school laws and decrees - affirmatively declared positivism's resistance to religious education.

=== Lenten pastoral commandments ===
The bishops quickly responded to the second Ferry law. For Lent 1882, eighty-eight episcopal mandements condemned the law's provisions and urged parents to enroll their children in free Catholic schools. These statements were occasionally read during Sunday sermons for the faithful. The tone varied based on the bishop and ranged from religious defense to anti-Republican criticism or moderation.

In his "Lettre à Messieurs les Curés du diocèse relative aux catéchismes et à la confession des enfants qui fréquentent les écoles publiques," Bishop Mgr. Perraud of Autun-Chalon-Mâcon invites the clergy to explain the political situation with moderation, avoiding attacks on the teaching system and civil servants responsible for its administration. "It is primarily a matter of aiding and motivating parents to fulfill all of their legal obligations and not overlook any of their rights concerning their children.

Cardinal Guibert, along with others, composed a letter to all the teachers in his district, urging them to exercise circumspection and rationality amidst political discord."

Other bishops were stauncher; In his mandement on Christian education, Mgr. Pierre-Louis-Marie Cortet, bishop of Troyes, urged families to be watchful: "We are attacking childhood and those entrusted with its education to accomplish our diabolical objective of de-Christianizing the individual, the family, and France more effectively." Finally, there were some manuals that were preemptively condemned for inciting irreligion. One such example is Mgr. Victor Delannoy, the Bishop of Aire, who criticized Gabriel Compayré's manual. Another example is Mgr. de La Foata, the Bishop of Ajaccio, who wrote about this issue during Lent in 1882ː

"If the doctrine is manifestly impious, if it shines in the eyes of children, as one of the advantages of their future freedom, the right they would have to profane the Lord's Day, to regard all religions as equally good, to pass from one to another, and even to profess none of them, these books carry with them their condemnation. Every Christian can and must place them among the prohibited books, without waiting for an episcopal decision; but, if need be We reprobate and condemn them as of now, and We forbid their reading."

— Paul-Matthieu de La Foata, Lettre pastorale de Mgr l'évêque d'Ajaccio au clergé de son diocèse à l'occasion de la nouvelle loi sur l'enseignement primaire.

=== Textbook selection by the commissions ===
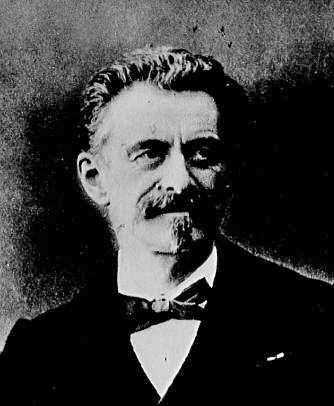
Émile Keller, president of the primary education committee of the Société générale d'éducation et d'enseignement, a conservative association campaigning against the secularization of the French education system.

The initial step in enacting the March 28, 1882 law was to choose new textbooks on morality. School commissions, directed by the June 16, 1880 decree, were tasked by the lawmakers with this responsibility.

Several Catholic bishops encouraged their followers to participate in these commissions to influence textbook selection in order to protect Catholic interests. Their objective was to maintain references to Catholic morality or prevent subversion of Catholic doctrine in the textbooks. On the contrary, Paul Bert, who served as the Minister of Public Instruction, advocated the use of secular morality textbooks over those written by Catholics. This solidified the exclusion of denominational teaching from schools as part of the secularization process. As a result, textbooks became a contentious issue that stirred up strong emotions in 1882 French society.

Despite the Société générale d'éducation et d'enseignement offering support for the bishops' actions, Catholic efforts yielded limited results. Initially, cantonal school commissions, composed of teachers who could receive families' grievances, developed a list. However, the Inspector of the Académie oversaw a departmental commission, staffed by teacher-training college instructors, which provided additional assistance. This secondary level of control significantly restricts the impact of parents. For instance, the Jura Department Commission removes textbooks from Catholic publishers from its list, even if two cantonal commissions considered them. Nonetheless, in some areas, public education officials partially acquiesced to Catholic requests. Eure-et-Loir resolved to employ solely the second edition of Paul Bert's L'instruction civique à l'école à l'école. In Pas-de-Calais, the Inspector of the Académie decided not to circulate any books on morality during the 1882–1883 school year. Similarly, in Finistère, Gard, Ille-et-Vilaine, Indre-et-Loire, Meurthe-et-Moselle, and Vienne, Paul Bert's textbook was restricted by some teachers who believed it to be too provocative.

The school boards' scope of responsibility was significantly limited as per the circular issued on June 13, 1882. This resulted in a removal of their control and inspection rights. As a consequence of this limitation, priests were no longer offered a seat on the boards.

=== The "56 Manifesto ===
Catholic politicians opposed the March 28 law. Fifty-six deputies from the intransigent right signed a manifesto on March 31, 1882, drafted by Mgr. Freppel. They protested against the abolition of religious education in schools, considering the law a misfortune for France. They reserved the right to repeal it at a later date and pledged to assist parents whose children might receive teaching that offended their faith.

The Catholic Circles (Note: Founded in 1872 by Albert de Mun.) expressed support for resistance and the abolition of the law. On July 9, 1882, in Bordeaux, Albert de Mun and other prominent figures demanded disobedience and spoke against L'instruction civique à l'école.

Roman authorities showed a conciliatory response. Despite his public statements, Jules Ferry also refrained from action. Indeed, on July 27, 1882, he signed the decree that organized the pedagogy and curriculum of elementary school, with the section on moral education including "duties towards God" (reported in the Journal officiel on August 2, 1882). After this act of goodwill, opposition appeared to diminish until a decree from the Congregation of the Index resulted in the textbook crisis.

=== Indexing of four morality textbooks ===
As the choice of textbooks for French schools in 1882-1883 was determined by excluding Catholics, textbooks written by freethinkers or promoting rationalism in moral matters were introduced. These textbooks mainly focused on four themes: devoir envers Dieu (duties to God were eventually eliminated from the curriculum in 1923), devoirs envers la patrie, devoirs envers les parents, and devoirs envers soi-même. This duty-based morality was influenced by Kantian morality, which was taught by Victor Cousin at the Sorbonne.

Complaints arose from the Catholic hierarchy, leading twenty French bishops to bring the matter to the attention of the Congregation of the Index. Simultaneously, the bishops of Saint-Dié, Aix-en-Provence, Tulle, and Moulins unilaterally denounced L'instruction civique à l'école on October 18, 1882, without awaiting the Holy See's decision.

On December 15, 1882, the Congregation issued a decree denouncing four morality textbooks. Besides Mme Gréville, the authors of the listed books had significant political involvement, and their publication aimed to serve both militant and pedagogical purposes.

- L'instruction civique à l'école, written by Paul Bert, (Note: Minister of Public Instruction from November 14, 1881 to January 22, 1882, and notorious freethinker.) portrays the Catholic Church as closely linked to the tyranny of the Ancien Régime and its crushing tax system. The French Revolution represents a founding event that liberated France from an all-powerful Church. The chapter concludes with a prayer, using religious language to ironically bless the Revolution. Finally, the author stigmatizes religious beliefs as "superstitions" in several instances, including the foreword of Éléments d'éducations morale et civique, written by Gabriel Compayré, deputy of the Tarn region. The foreword critiques miracles and questions the existence of the supernatural.
- Éléments d'éducation morale et civique, written by Gabriel Compayré, deputy of the Tarn. In this work, the author presents a spiritual perspective on the existence of God and the immortality of the soul, positioning himself outside of any established religion and rejecting any religious rituals or dogmas. Instead, the author emphasizes the importance of moral duty. Religious marriage, for instance, is portrayed as a matter of choice.
- Instruction morale et civique: l'homme, le citoyen, by Jules Steeg, former Protestant pastor turned deist, deputy for Gironde and general inspector of primary education. The primary critique aimed at this textbook by Catholics is its defense of freedom of belief, relegation of religion to a private matter, and denial of the necessity for religious authority. The presentation of French history similarly lacks balance, with the author accusing Louis XVI of conspiring against the Republic, but failing to mention his death or the resulting Terror.
- Instruction morale et civique des jeunes filles, by Mme Gréville (her real name was Alice Marie Céleste Fleury). This guidebook for young girls emphasizes the values of politeness, modesty, and responsibility. However, it is noteworthy that the name of God is absent, unlike in the three previous editions.

In regards to the four manuals mentioned above, they are condemned by the Catholic Church and are therefore forbidden to be read. The decree from the Congregation provides specific steps for Catholics to follow regarding these booksː

"Consequently, let no one, of any rank or condition whatsoever, have the audacity to publish, read or keep the aforementioned works in any place or language whatsoever, but let everyone be required to hand them over to the ordinary of the place or to the inquisitors of heretical perversity, under the penalties enacted in the Index of forbidden books."

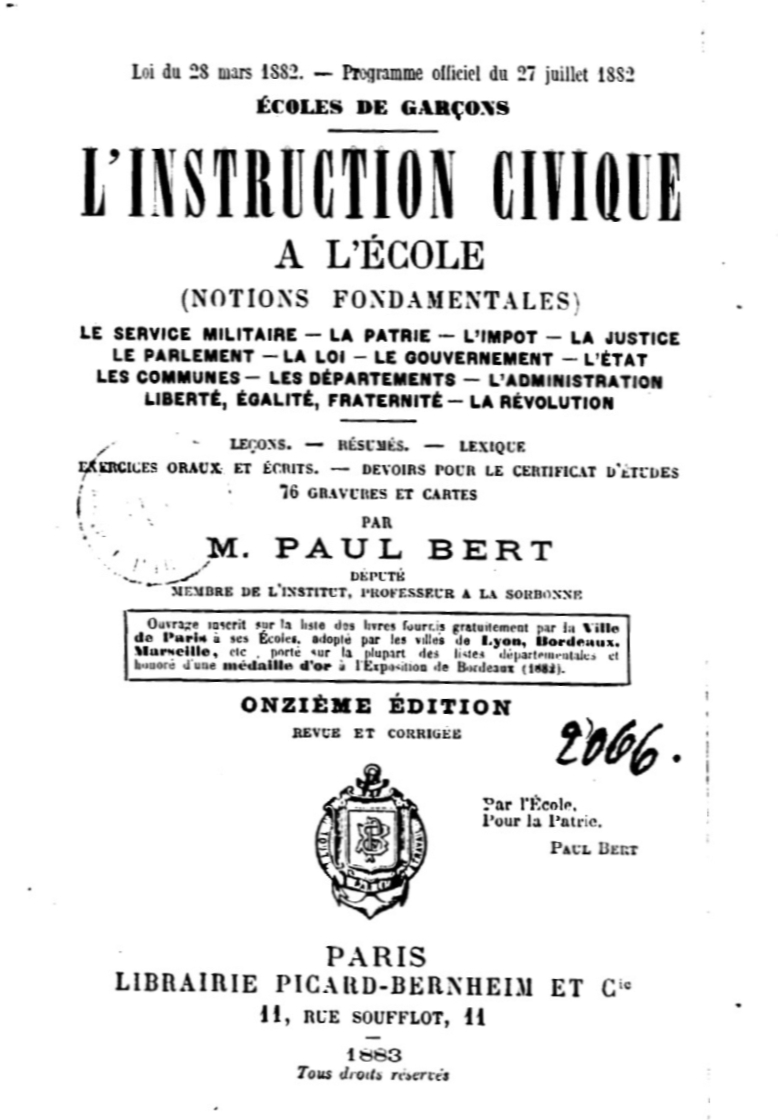
L'instruction civique à l'école, by Paul Bert.

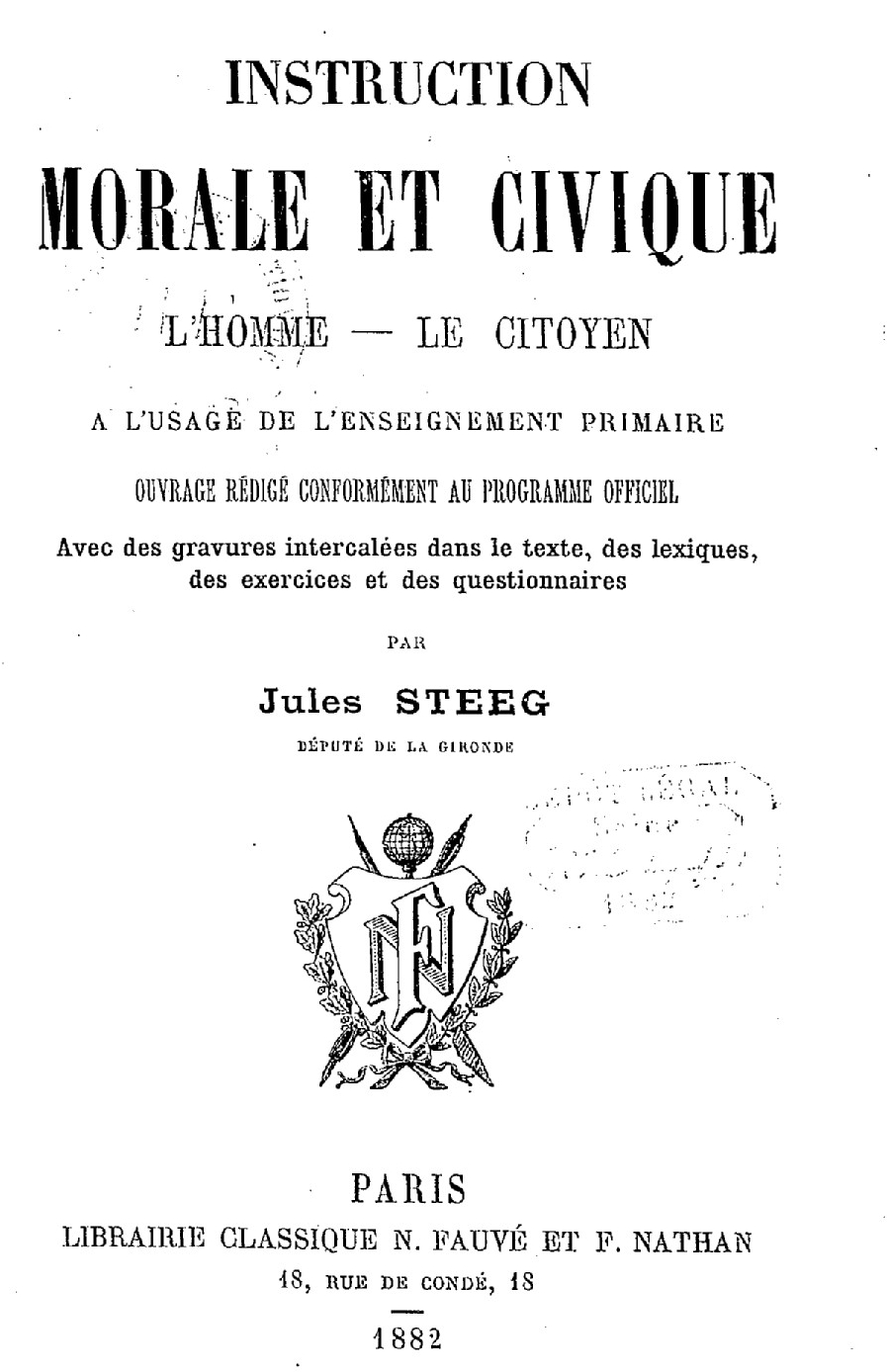
Instruction morale et civique, by Jules Steeg.

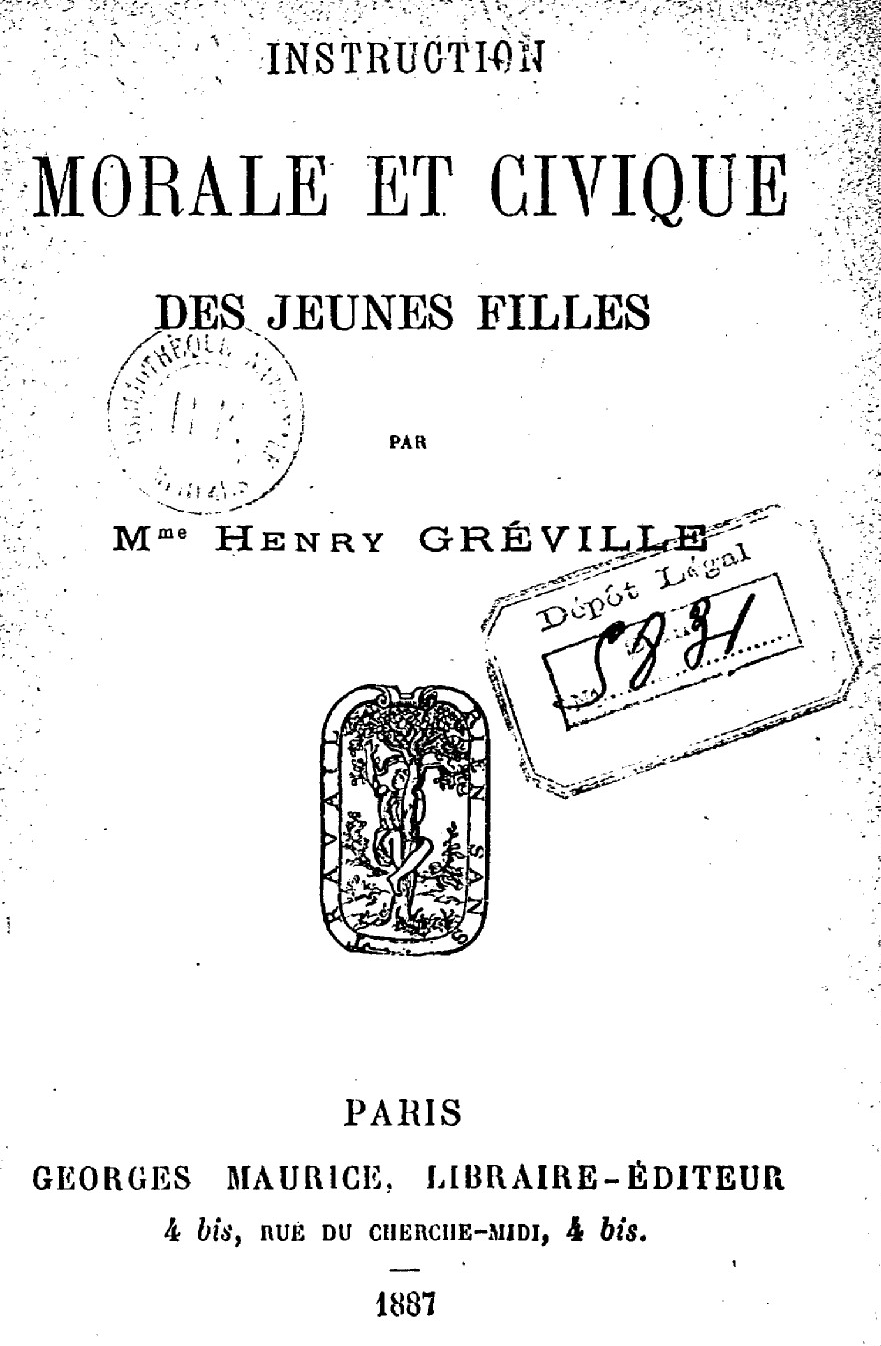
Instruction morale et civique des jeunes filles, de Henry Gréville.

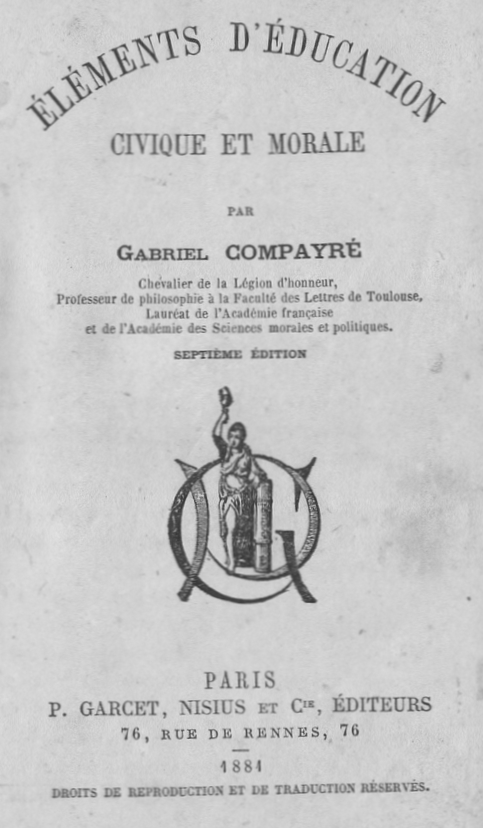
Éléments d'éducation morale et civique, de Gabriel Compayré.

The publishers of the banned textbooks arose during the Third Republic, positioning themselves close to those in power, driven by their desire to publish Republican representatives and bolster the Ferry legislation.

In response to the four blacklisted books, the clergy proposed religious texts, catechisms, and instructional manuals. J. Pégat's civics textbook, "La Commune, le département et l'État"; textbooks published by Mame, Eugène Ardant (who published a series of primers), Barbou (who published a series of moral tales), Louis-Joseph Lefort and his numerous reading methods. With the secularization of schools, these publishers lost their exclusive control over school books. They were replaced by large republican school publishers who took over the market and emerged as the winners of this textbook war.

=== Government response ===
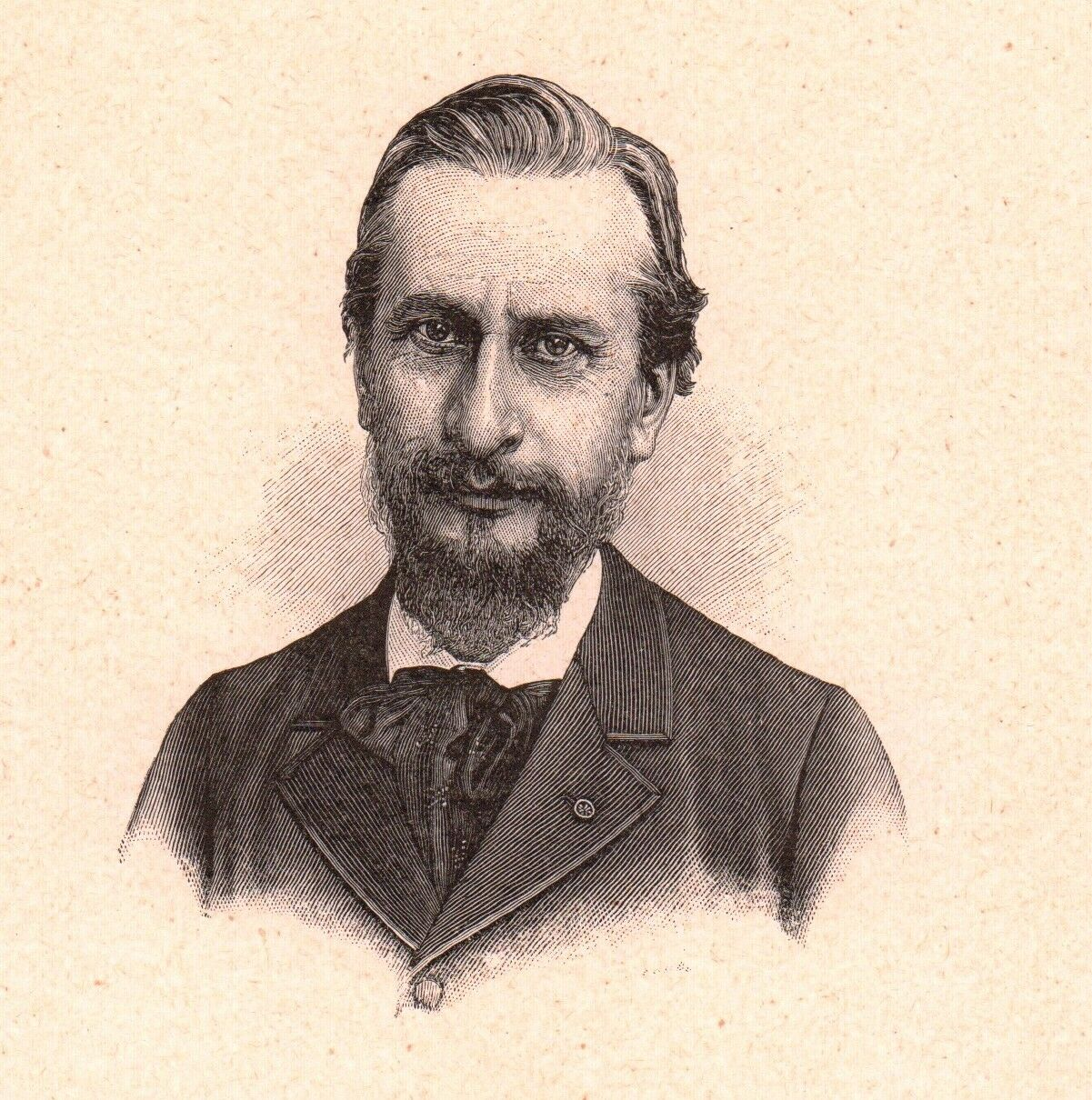
Émile Flourens, Director of Religious Affairs from July 1879 to 1885.

On January 10 and 11, 1883, the Congregation issued a decree which was published in the Catholic daily L'Univers and scheduled to be read from the pulpit a few days later. However, the government acted swiftly and forbade the reading of the decree in parishes. The Director of Religious Affairs, Émile Flourens, cited the rule that all papal bulls require validation by a decree of the Council of State before being published in France.

Five bishops, including Mgr. Isoard of Annecy, Mgr. Charles-Pierre-François Cotton of Valence, Mgr. Étienne-Émile Ramadié, Archbishop of Albi, Mgr. Guillaume-Marie Frédéric Bouange of Langres, and Mgr. Joseph-Michel-Frédéric Bonnet of Viviers, declined to comply with the government's measure and devised mandates to have them read in churches under their authority. Some others opted for evasive allusions or made general recommendations to circumvent the government's directive. The government suspended the salaries of clergy who disregarded government directives, taking advantage of the fact that Catholic clergy were paid by the State under the Concordat regime of 1801. The prefects instigated the processing of 2,000 suspensions of salary by the Conseil d'État -recently purged of its members suspected of clericalism- and affected five rebellious bishops, including Mgr. Isoard, who was condemned for his pastoral letter of January 21, 1883.

=== Local tensions ===
==== Constant mobilization ====
The press played a crucial role in publicizing the conflict and relaying legislative developments, while also provoking controversies through the contributions of columnists. Advocacy for resistance was a recurring theme in the conservative and Catholic press. Additionally, local parish bulletins and the Semaines Religieuses of the different dioceses reflected their continuous preoccupation with the secularization of schools. The press campaign peaks once the Index decree is released, as newspapers serve as the main medium for the Holy See to convey its position to the Catholic population. Articles showcasing Catholic or Republican reactions become more plentiful, further inflaming the ideological struggle.

Bishops implored parents and educators to utilize alternative textbooks and surrender prohibited literature to the parish priest for disposal. These exhortations were executed: textbooks were confiscated or destroyed en masse locally, and recalcitrant families were denied the sacraments, especially First Communion, by the parish priest, based on the bishops' recommendation. A report by the Prefect of the Drôme disclosed the following statements attributed to Mgr. Cotton:

"Children who attend schools where the condemned textbooks are adopted as classics seem to us to be exposed to the permanent and very imminent danger of losing their faith and contracting the most deplorable habits. We therefore judge that those of them who have already made their first communion should not be admitted to the sacraments, if they have not made it yet must be postponed as long as they remain in occasion to sin."

During the months leading up to this Catholic rite of passage, families become especially receptive to the clergy's guidance, resulting in a higher frequency of incidents. The clergy's influence is felt not only during catechism sessions, but also through the confessional, primarily impacting mothers who tend to be more attuned to religious matters than fathers.

While the Société générale d'éducation et d'enseignement supported the movement, it remained more moderate than L'Univers and refrained from endorsing civil disobedience or school strikes.

==== A strong regional character ====
Political scientist Yves Déloye has created two maps illustrating the resistance by department, without subjective evaluations. There is a growing number of incidents, with a radicalization of the conflict occurring in Ariège, Doubs, Drôme, Gers, Gironde, Landes, Haute-Marne, Pyrénées-Orientales, Tarn, Var, and Vosges. The most impacted dioceses (Albi, Annecy, Tulle, and Valence) are impacted as a result of the impetus given by their bishops or the intense militancy from the lower clergy.

Notables in some French regions supported the actions of the Catholic hierarchy and involved their clients in the resistance. The mayor of Luzé, in Indre-et-Loire, was identified by the prefect as one responsible for local unrest. The commune of Luzé, which has 429 inhabitants, is considered one of the most conservative and backward in the department. The movement is heavily influenced by a mayor and a minister who are among the most dedicated and zealous members of the clerical-monarchical party.

It is interesting to observe that regions with established free schools, such as Brittany, Indre-et-Loire and Vendée, have not been significantly impacted by this movement. In fact, teachers in these regions have opted to implement the 1882 law with caution to prevent students from leaving secular schools in favor of Congregational schools. This was not a mere fear - it was a reality. The decrease in enrollment in certain villages within Tarn was shockingly high: "At Saint-Sernin-lès-Lavaur, only one pupil remained out of 31; at Saint-Jean-de-Marcel, only 4 out of 68; at Maurens-Scopont, only 12 out of 43; at Montredon, only 10 out of 51..". Interestingly, in regions with a strong Congregationalist presence, the use of condemned textbooks was circumvented. The Inspector of the Indre-et-Loire Academy documented the situation within his department:

"We must therefore strive, wherever possible and without neglecting any opportunity, to reduce the number of communes where the denominational neutrality of schools has not yet been fully established. Say a short prayer where the abrupt suppression of this practice would favor the rival Congregational school; make it disappear elsewhere as soon as an opportunity arises, either the vacation period, or the change of teacher."

=== Gradual appeasement ===
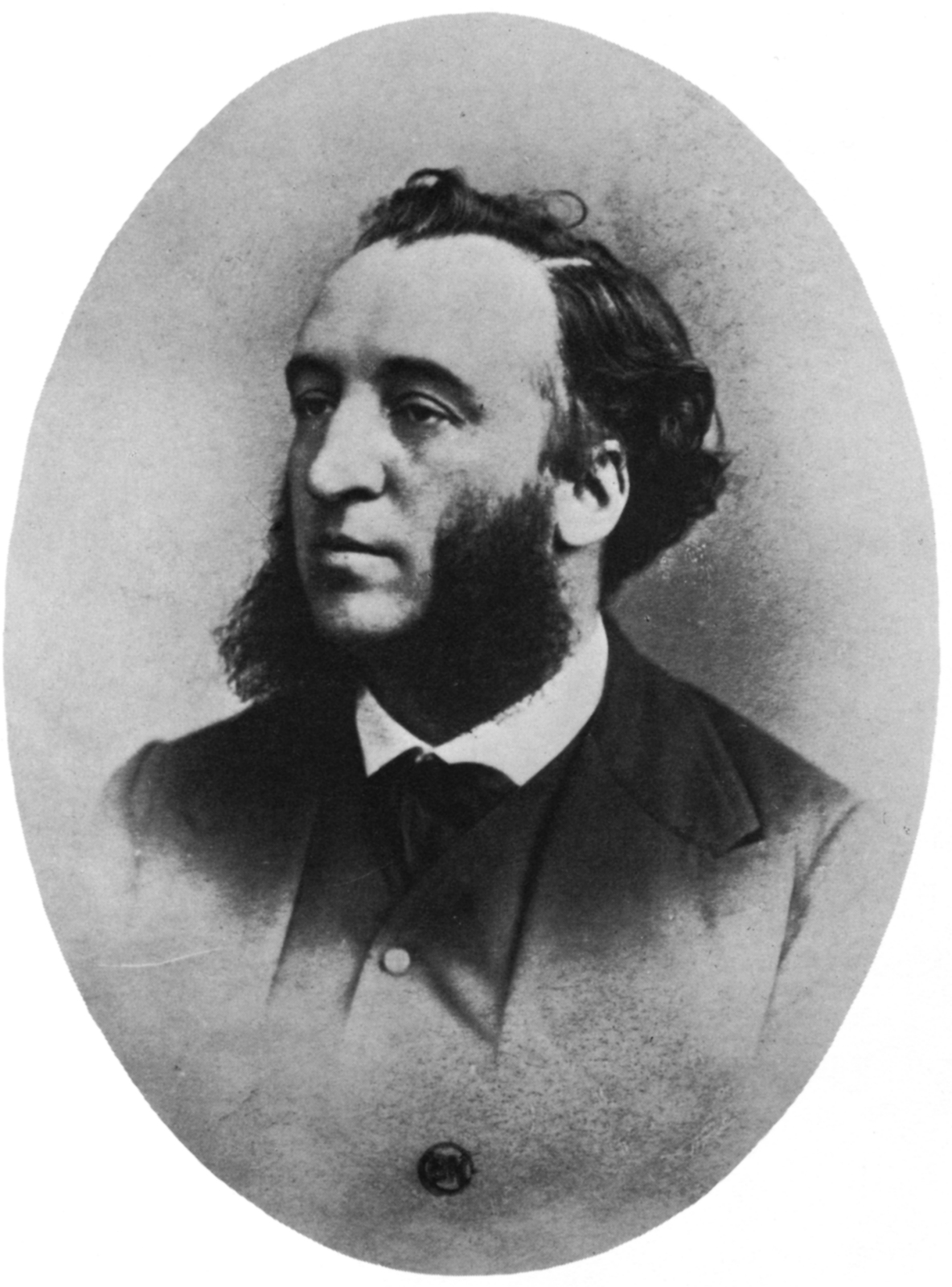
Jules Ferry, once again President of the Council of France from February 1883 to March 1885, photograph by Nadar.

Although there are high tensions in certain areas, they are not prevalent across the country. Numerous bishops are handling the decree with caution and moderation or not enforcing it altogether. As per political scientist Yves Déloye, only 6% of communes experienced significant mobilization.

A discussion between Leo XIII and Jules Ferry commenced via the nuncio, Mgr. Camillo Siciliano di Rende, and the ambassador, Édouard Lefebvre de Béhaine. Léon XIII diplomatically restrained the Church's most radical supporters. Émile Flourens, through negotiations with the Holy See, issued a directive on June 30, 1883, prolonging the prohibition of salaries and urging all relevant clergy to engage in talks with the government. Out of the initial 2,000 suspensions, only 500 were affirmed by the Conseil d'État, which included that of Mgr. Isoard.

Finally, Jules Ferry urged schoolteachers to practice restraint in November 1883. It is worth noting that he was not the President of the council during the passing of the secular law in the prior year under the Gouvernement Charles de Freycinet (2) administration:

"When you propose a precept or maxim to your students, ask yourself if you know of a single honest man who might be offended by what you're about to say. Ask yourself whether any father - and I mean any father - present in your class and listening to you, could in good faith refuse his assent to what he would hear you say. If so, refrain from saying it; if not, speak boldly: for what you are going to communicate to the child is not your own wisdom; it is the wisdom of the human race, one of those ideas of universal order that several centuries of civilization have made part of the heritage of humanity."

— Jules Ferry, Letter to Teachers, November 17, 1883.

The correspondence did not receive the unanimous consent of the government majority and attracted censuring remarks from the most extremist Republicans and Ferdinand Buisson. Nevertheless, the temperance exhibited by the secular school proponent facilitated the normalization of the circumstance, slowly concluding the crisis.

== Raisons de la condamnation des manuels ==
The mobilization regarding textbooks indicates that "education is now a privileged terrain for observing society's profound forces, the weightiness of traditions, and the desire for innovation and alignment with contemporary morals," as Jean-Marie Mayeur suggests. Catholic elites, who frequently monitor textbook content, point out two issues with the criticized educational materials: anti-religious sentiment and morality that lacks religious references.

=== Anticlericalism ===
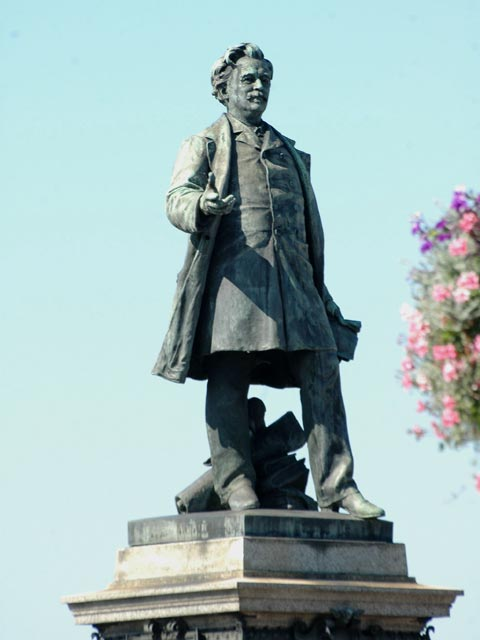
Statue of Paul Bert in Auxerre. Paul Bert was Minister of Public Instruction in the Gambetta cabinet (November 14, 1881 - January 22, 1882).

Historian René Rémond's definition of anticlericalism is as follows: "Anticlericalism suspends judgment and can be combined with metaphysical negation (in the case of Marxist socialism) or go hand in hand with a profession of deist faith. It does not imply irreligion but rather seeks to limit the influence of religion, especially of the clergy, within certain bounds. Rémond believes that religions should remain within the private sphere."

The textbooks' anti-clericalism can be explained by Paul Bert and the Radical Republicans' need for replacing the clergy or Congregation's predominant influence on young people with a strictly Republican influence. During a speech on August 19, 1880, in Auxerre, Paul Bert emphasized that "this is our secular Church, where scientific and demonstrable truths are taught, where civic virtues and the religion of the Fatherland are taught." Jules Ferry's government believed that the influence of the clergy was an inappropriate interference in the Republic. The State's anti-clericalism was based on the view that "all religion is destined to degenerate into clericalism". This stance was upheld by certain intransigent Catholics, such as the Catholic committees who adopted a traditionalist, ultramontane approach. This view was championed by parliamentarians, including the influential Mgr. Félix Dupanloup the Senate.

According to a contemporary Catholic author, the condemnation of four textbooks reflected an anti-clericalism that was evident in the criticism of Catholicism's historical actions:

"The doctrine is identical. In politics, the systematic denigration of all that preceded 89, the worship of the Revolution before which French society was a little below the savage state in morals, [...] then the hatred of the Catholic religion which oozes everywhere even though it is nowhere formulated."

— Joseph Burnichon, Les manuels d'éducation civique et morale et la condamnation de l'Index, Marseille, Société anonyme de l'Imprimerie marseillaise, 1883, p. 6

=== The disappearance of God in morality ===
M. Herbelot, who investigated on behalf of the Archdiocese of Paris, notes in his report that several republican textbooks, including L'instruction civique à l'école and Éléments d'éducations morale et civique, "remain[ed] foreign to any religious or supernatural notion" and that their "moral teaching [was] singularly inadequate" in its omission of duties to God. Catholic elites view civic education as replacing the catechism would create a "school without God". According to the Catholic newspaper La Croix:

"The law of March 28, 1882 was an intimation to God to get out of school. No more priest with the child, no more catechism to teach his duties and the purpose of life: that was its aim. Those who had outlawed the catechism thought of replacing it, and so these civic instruction manuals appeared, in which the name of God was not pronounced. They showed in what sense the teacher should teach, to teach the child to do without God."

— La Croix, June 26, 1883

The teaching of secular morality in public was perceived as an anti-religious effort. On April 10, 1883, Mgr. Louis-Romain-Ernest Isoard wrote to Jules Ferry, citing from Gabriel Compayré's textbook: "When Georges was asked where he found the strength he needed to fulfill all these duties, he always replied: 'In the feeling of my personal dignity,'" and added the following commentary: "The belief in the constant need for God's assistance, in grace, cannot be more completely rejected." The author's intention of the entire work is to make religion irrelevant and replace God with man.

In his research on secular textbooks from 1870 to 1885, political scientist Yves Déloye found that condemned textbooks only dedicated 2% (Note: This compares with 9% for L. Mabilleau's Cours de morale and 13% for A. Franck's La morale pour tous, for example.) of their pages to religious topics, and relegated those chapters to the end of the books, demonstrating their secondary importance in secular morality.

The proponents of positivism base their morality on science. They argue that science frees children's moral duties from religion. For instance, Jules Payot, former Rector at the French Academy of Education, affirmed thatː "Morality is a science with an obviousness similar to that of geometry[..]. It is necessary to demonstrate, unequivocally, the importance of duties toward parents and the responsibility to work." This is the reason why Mgr. Paul-Matthieu de La Foata observesː "Children will comprehend that God does not have a place in moral teachings because Religion is viewed as a solely human construct, consisting of incompatible superstitions with the enlightenment that science offers."

=== State atheism ===
The bishops' defense argued for the neutrality of schools, but opposed atheism by suggesting that any book that undermined religion should be banned, as religious books already had been by the government.

Senator Victor Schoelcher's declaration of atheism during debates on the secularism law on March 23, 1882, bolstered the sense of secularism opposing faith in God. The Bishop of Tours referred to Schoelcher's declaration of atheism in his circular letter.

These tensions led Minister Jules Ferry to pledge to protect the faith of students: "Any teacher," the Minister added, "who would cause harm to the religious beliefs of their pupils through their instruction should anticipate severe punishment."

== Subsequent developments ==
The initial conflict over textbooks culminated in a compromise, yet it contained all the underlying tensions that would subsequently surface during the school war (1907-1914).

While periodic unrest persisted in French society, Jules Ferry's school remained relatively uncontroversial between 1884 and 1886. In 1886, the school question resurfaced with debates that resulted in the passing of the Goblet Law. This law completed the secularization of the school system, as it denied religious individuals the opportunity to teach in public schools. Some viewed this as an infringement on individual rights and a violation of freedom of education.

Once the moderate Republicans' secularism was firmly established, the Radicals and Radical-Socialists - from the left of the Chamber of Deputies - came to power in 1902 and rekindled the school debate. These individuals, who were more committed to anti-clericalism than Jules Ferry and were influenced by Freemasonry, sought to further the de-Christianization of French society. The outcome was the 1904 law that eliminated teaching congregations and the 1905 French law on the Separation of the Churches and the State. This retreat in Catholic doctrine's influence led to the School War (1907-1914), commencing with the Morizot affair and concluding in a lengthier, more violent war concerning textbooks.

== Bibliography ==
- ^{(fr)} Christian Amalvi, "Les guerres des manuels autour de l’école primaire en France (1899-1914)", Revue historique, no 532, October-December 1979, p. 359-398.
- ^{(fr)} Louis Capéran, Histoire de la laïcité républicaine, t. III: La laïcité en marche, Paris, Nouvelles Éditions Latines, 1961, 328 p. (read online archive), chap. 2 and 3.
- ^{(fr)} Gérard Cholvy and Yves-Marie Hilaire, Histoire religieuse de la France contemporaine, t. II: 1880–1930, Toulouse, Privat, 1986, 457 p.
- ^{(fr)} Jean-François Condette, "Les deux "guerres" des manuels scolaires dans le Nord et le Pas-de-Calais (1882-1883 et 1908–1910)", in Éducation, Religion, Laïcité (xvie-xxe s.). Continuités, tensions et ruptures dans la formation des élèves et des enseignants, Publications de l’Institut de recherches historiques du Septentrion, coll. "Histoire et littérature du Septentrion (IRHiS)", 2010, 552 p. (ISBN 978-2-490296-17-0, read online archive), p. 407–459.
- ^{(fr)} Pierre Chevallier, La séparation de l’Église et de l’école: Jules Ferry et Léon XIII, Paris, Fayard, 1981
- ^{(fr)} Yves Déloye, chap. V "Les guerres scolaires", in École et citoyenneté: l’individualisme républicain de Jules Ferry à Vichy: controverses, Paris, Presses de la Fondation nationale des sciences politiques, 1994 (ISBN 978-2-7246-0655-3, OCLC 32818865, read online archive), p. 199-286.
  - From La citoyenneté au miroir de l'école républicaine et de ses contestations: politique et religion en France xixe - xxe siècle, thesis for the doctorate in political science directed by Pierre Birnbaum and defended at Panthéon-Sorbonne University on November 26, 1991, 2 vols. 906 pp.
- ^{(fr)} Jean Faury, Cléricalisme et anticléricalisme dans le Tarn (1848-1900), Toulouse, Université Toulouse-Le-Mirail, 1980, 532 p. (ISBN 978-2-7089-6900-1), chap. VII.
- ^{(fr)} Jacques Gadille, La pensée et l'action politiques des évêques français au début de la IIIe République (1870-1883), Paris, Hachette, 1967, 351 and 334 p., 2 vol.
- ^{(fr)} Maurice Gontard, L’œuvre scolaire de la Troisième République, Toulouse, Éditions de l’Institut pédagogique de Toulouse, 1965
  - p. 35.
- ^{(fr)} Dominique Maingueneau, Les livres d’école de la République (1870-1914): Discours et idéologie, Paris, Le Sycomore, 1979, 343 p. (ISBN 978-2-86262-022-0).
- ^{(fr)} Jean-Marie Mayeur, Les débuts de la Troisième République (1871-1898), Paris, Éditions du Seuil, 1973, 254 p. (ISBN 978-2-02-000670-5).
  - p. 37-38.
- ^{(fr)} Alain Mougniotte, chap. IV "L'adoption de la loi et son écho", in Les débuts de l'instruction civique en France, Presses universitaires de Lyon, 1991 (ISBN 978-2-490296-17-0, read online archive), p. 53-65.
- ^{(fr)} Mona Ozouf, L’École, l’Église et la République 1871-1914, Paris, Seuil, coll. "Points Sagesses", 1992 (réimpr. 2007) (1st ed. 1982), 259 p. (ISBN 978-2-02-096244-5).
- ^{(fr)} Philippe Rosset, "Les débuts de la laïcité scolaire et l’affaire des Manuels dans les Pyrénées-Orientales (1882-1883)", Annales du Midi, no 167, July-September 1984, p. 285-300.
- ^{(fr)} Éric Walter and Claude Lelièvre, La presse picarde, mémoire de la République: Luttes de mémoire et guerres scolaires à travers la presse de la Somme (1876-1914), Amiens, Centre universitaire de recherche sociologique, coll. "Cahiers du CURSA" (no 12), 1983, 160 p. (ISSN 0337-0992).
- ^{(fr)} Jean-Noël Jeanneney, "La guerre des Manuels scolaires", Le Monde, 29 August 1987.

== See also ==
=== Historic documents ===
- ^{(fr)} Anonyme, Examen critique du livre de M. Gabriel Compayré Éléments d'éducation civique et morale, par un catholique du Tarn, Paris, Librairie Victor Palmé, 1883, 62 p. (read online archive).
- ^{(fr)} Joseph Burnichon, Les Manuels d'éducation civique et morale et la condamnation de l'Index, Marseille, Société anonyme de l'Imprimerie marseillaise, 1883, 163 p. (read online archive).
- ^{(fr)} Émile Boutroux, "Les récents manuels de morale et d'instruction civique", Revue pédagogique, 15 April 1883, p. 289-342.
- ^{(fr)} Élie de Cyon, "La guerre à Dieu et la morale laïque, réponse à M. Paul Bert", Le Gaulois, Paris, 1881 (read online archive).
- ^{(fr)} Dominget (father), Le Bon Instituteur ou la Véritable Instruction civique opposée à l'instruction civique de M. Paul Bert, Paris, Hachette Livre BNF, coll. "Sciences sociales", 1st February 2016 (1st ed. 1885), 434 p. (ISBN 978-2-01-195388-9, read online archive in Gallica).
- ^{(fr)} Jules Ferry, Discours prononcé au Sénat à la séance du 31 mai 1883, réponse à l'interpellation du duc de Broglie concernant les livres destinés aux écoles primaires publiques, Paris, Imprimerie du Journal Officiel, 1883, 52 p.
- ^{(fr)} Ernest Lavisse, À propos de nos écoles, Paris, Armand Colin, 1885, 250 p.

=== External links ===
- Jérémy Del Bel, "Les manuels républicains et les deux guerres scolaires à la fin du xixe siècle et au début du xxe" archive, in Interfaces. Livres anciens de l'Université de Lyon (accessed 21 April 2020).
- Exposition Apprendre à croire [PDF] archive, 2016, Bibliothèque Diderot de Lyon.
