= French School Wars =

Series of debates and conflicts in France

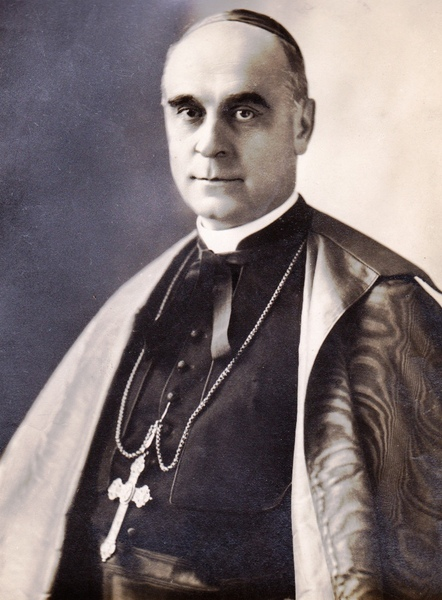
Cardinal Merry del Val, Pope Pius X's Secretary of State and a major player in the school war on the side of the Catholic hierarchy.

The French School Wars between 1900 and 1910 were political and social controversies over the role of religion in French education and centred on the law separating Church and state. The Morizot affair surfaced in 1907 after a teacher was charged with making anti-religious comments.

The government, feeling the pressure from the Ligue de l'enseignement, introduced a bill to exempt schoolteachers from civil courts and fine families who declined to teach their children secular ethics. The Catholic Church swiftly reacted; in its September 1908 declaration, the French episcopate challenged the new legislation and reaffirmed families' right to regulate the education provided in public schools. In the months that followed, the French cardinals, led by the intransigent Rafael Merry del Val, worked to redefine the educational doctrine of the Church in France. In September 1909, their efforts culminated in the rejection of school neutrality, the preference for free schools and the condemnation of approximately 15 school textbooks.

This marked the beginning of a "textbook war," similar to the one that had troubled France between 1882 and 1883. What was novel, however, was the significant role attributed to Catholic organizations – such as the Société générale d'éducation et d'enseignement, the Ligue patriotique des Françaises, and the Associations des pères de familles – and their mobilization, which was long integral to the campaign.

The crisis persisted for numerous years with the radicals battling until 1914 to pass their "secular defense" initiatives. The Sacred Union, which governed at the onset of World War I, ended conflicts in schools. After the war, while secular education persisted, Christian schools experienced an increase in enrollment and received full attention from the French Catholic hierarchy. Additionally, the school war empowered Pius X to establish his superiority over the French episcopate, subduing Gallicanism temporarily.

== Context ==
The first school war of the 20th century began just as the passions raised by debates over the secularization of French society were beginning to die down. The calm was short-livedː the school question, which was not at the forefront of the troubles that shook France, found fertile ground in the situation after the separation to unleash French passions.

=== Secularization by Radical Republic ===
Following the Dreyfus affair and the legislative elections of 1902, the French government was primarily controlled by the Radicals. They prioritized anti-clericalism and implemented numerous laws to promote the secularization of French society such as the 1904 law on congregations and the law on the separation of church and state that was passed on December 9, 1905.

The Pope and his advisor Mgr Rafael Merry del Val strongly denounced the unilateral termination of the Concordat regime because of the Radicals' previous hostility towards the papacy. The Radicals broke off diplomatic relations between France and the Holy See in 1904. On February 11, 1906, in his encyclical Vehementer Nos, the Pope spoke out against separation and cited its potential threat to the supernatural order.

Relations between the Third Republic and Catholics deteriorated during the Querelle des Inventaires, which led to the fall of the Rouvier government. In August 1906, Pius X opposed religious associations managing Church property and the January 2, 1907 law expelled bishops, parish priests, and seminarians from episcopal palaces, presbyteries, and seminaries. The School Wars began within that complex religious context.

=== School issue ===
Before the separation, Catholic education was primarily delegated to religious orders, with limited participation from laypeople or ordained clergy. However, the implementation of the Education Act of 1901, along with the ban on teaching by religious orders through the Entente Law of 1904, drastically altered the landscape of public education. The dispersal of religious orders resulted in the closure of numerous free schools. The French episcopate simultaneously waged two campaigns: the restructuring of Catholic schools with personnel recruited from both the laity and secularized religious groups and the heightened monitoring of public schools, which had capitalized on the decline of religious orders to enroll more students.

Secular schoolteachers frequently displayed less restraint because of their strong secularism, which was often combined with socialism or antimilitarism. As a result, they frequently violated the rules of scholastic neutrality that had been established by Jules Ferry. The trend was exacerbated by the fact that teacher colleges, which were known for their anticlericalism, contributed to those practices. Since the separation, France's bishops had regained their freedom and no longer sought to restrict themselves to conciliate with the government, unlike before the separation. Some bishops were organizing parents' associations to monitor public schools, and all were urging their flocks to be wary. They no longer intended to turn a blind eye to a situation that they considered intolerable. The Morizot affair and the ensuing school war found a ripe breeding ground in the intersection of defiant teachers and Catholic anxiety.

== Development ==
=== Morizot Affair (1907-1908) ===
In early 1907, Girodet, a father, filed a complaint against Morizot, a secular schoolteacher in Viévigne, Côte-d'Or. Morizot reportedly made unpatriotic and anti-religious comments in front of the mixed class that he was overseeing and specifically referred to French soldiers as "thugs and cowards." The given text cannot be revised, as it consists of inappropriate and offensive statements.

The complaint was lodged with the civil court, but the court of first instance declared itself incompetent. The father appealed to the Dijon Court of Appeal, which declared itself competent. The decision prompted a response from Arthur Dessoye, deputy for Haute-Marne and secretary general of the Ligue de l'enseignement, who questioned the procedure and objected to it being perceived as an attack on non-religious schools.

In response to his requests, the government referred the case to the Tribunal des conflits and requested that the Dijon court cede its jurisdiction. It was deemed appropriate for the teacher, in his capacity as a civil servant, to face prosecution in an administrative court instead of a traditional civil court. That would enable the government to exert influence over the judgment. On June 2, 1908, the Tribunal des conflits acknowledged the jurisdiction of the Dijon court. The court acknowledged that a public schoolteacher who makes comments in the classroom that seriously violate the school's religious neutrality is guilty of a personal fault and is financially responsible to the families of students affected. However, in some cases, violations of religious neutrality could be an administrative fault and fall under the jurisdiction of the State, rather than the personal responsibility of the teacher. The Conseil d'État would handle those cases. The case remains in the civil domain, causing disappointment for the Ligue de l'enseignement, which sought exemption for secular education officials.

=== Doumergue Bills (June 1908) ===
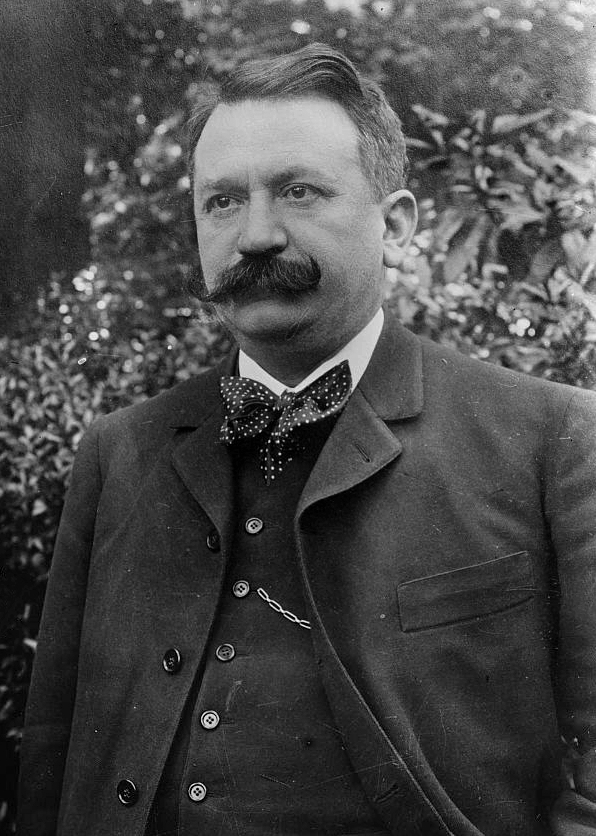
Gaston Doumergue, Minister of Education at the time of the Morizot affair.

In response to the pressure of secular education and radical influences, Gaston Doumergue, the Minister of Public Instruction and a Freemason, reintroduced the government's anti-religious policy through tabling three distinct bills on June 23 and 30, 1908. The bills were referred to as "secular defense".

The first goal was to enforce fines, as stipulated by law, upon fathers who prevented their children from completing some or all of their required schooling even if it was taught by teachers with anti-religious attitudes. The monetary penalties also applied to those who encouraged parents to adopt such practices, with a clear focus on Catholic organizations. The second draft aimed to relieve schoolteachers from personal legal action but shifts responsibility from them to the State for any faults committed while they exercised their duties. That effectively made schoolteachers unaccountable to parents and transferred all instances of anti-religious teaching to the French administrative courts. The third project sought to expand the requirement for private school teachers to hold a certificate of pedagogical aptitude.

Arthur Dessoye, who represented the Ligue de l'enseignement, was the rapporteur for those bills. The bills were well received by defenders of the secular school system, but Catholics found them extremely provocative, which led to major upheavals in French society. In the Chamber, several Catholic deputies, including Henri-Constant Groussau from the Nord region, vehemently protested them. As for the renowned polemicist Édouard Drumont, he unreservedly labeled Doumergue as "an escapee from the St. Bartholomew's Day Massacre" (Note: Drumont referred here to Doumergue's adherence to the Reformed religion.) in La Libre Parole on June 26, 1908.

=== Déclaration aux pères de famille (September 1908) ===
==== Hasty development ====
Between July and August 1908, Cardinal Merry del Val, Secretary of State of Pius X, consulted with several French prelates to coordinate the response. A document was drafted by four clergymen, backed by Rome, to decide on "the approach to be adopted when confronted with the dual proposal aimed at countering the actions of fathers in case of violation of academic neutrality": Cardinal Lecot, the Archbishop of Bordeaux; Cardinal Coullié, the Archbishop of Lyon; Cardinal Luçon, the Archbishop of Reims; and Cardinal Andrieu, the Bishop of Marseille. In August 1908, the Déclaration des cardinaux, archevêques et évêques de France aux pères de famille de leur pays (Declaration of the Cardinals, Archbishops, and Bishops of France to the Fathers of their Country) was sent to metropolitan bishops for their signatures and those of their suffragan bishops. It marked a departure from the autonomy of the French episcopate during the separation debates by asserting the preponderance of the Vatican.

The cardinal authors of the Declaration

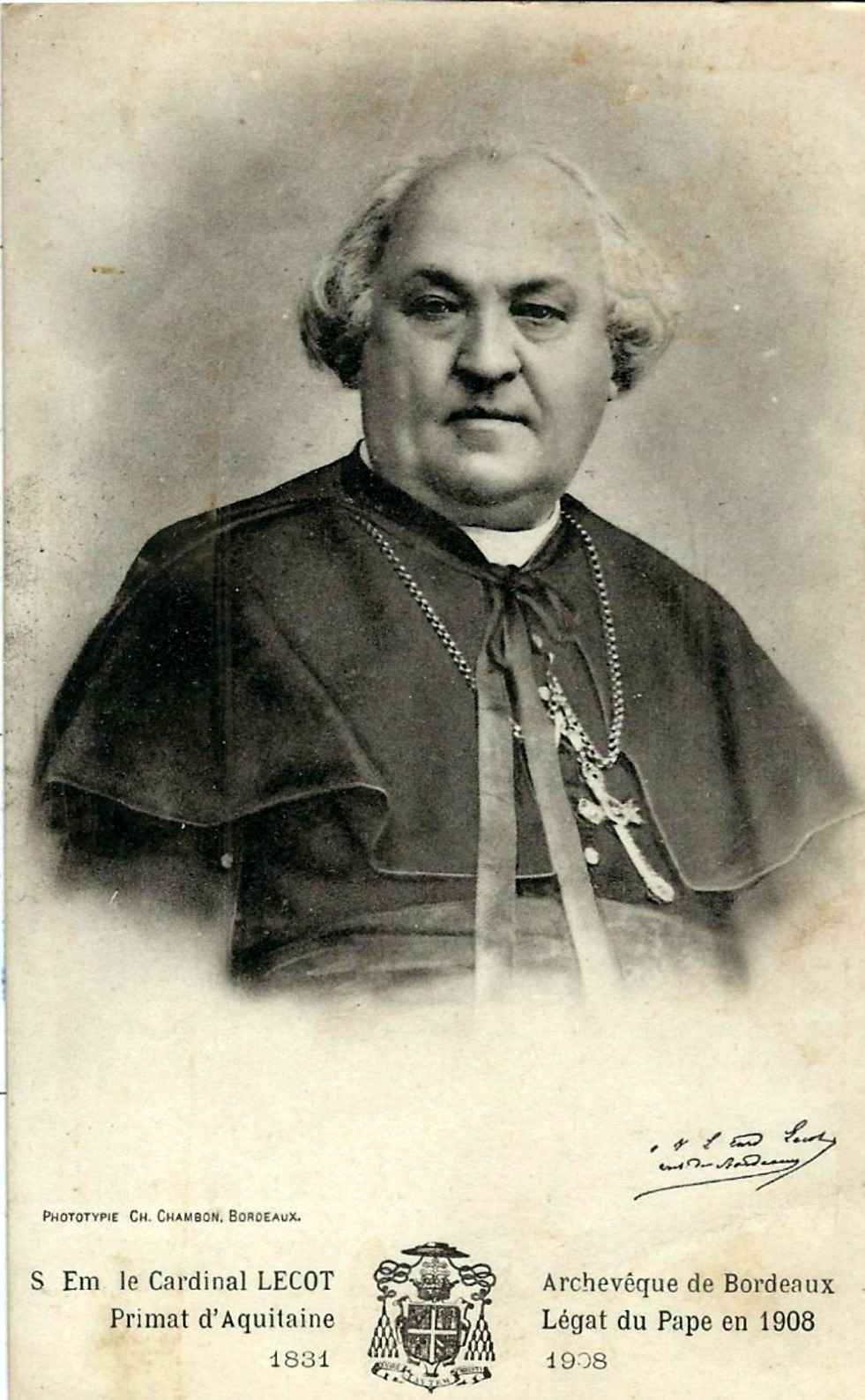
Victor Lecot, Archbishop of Bordeaux

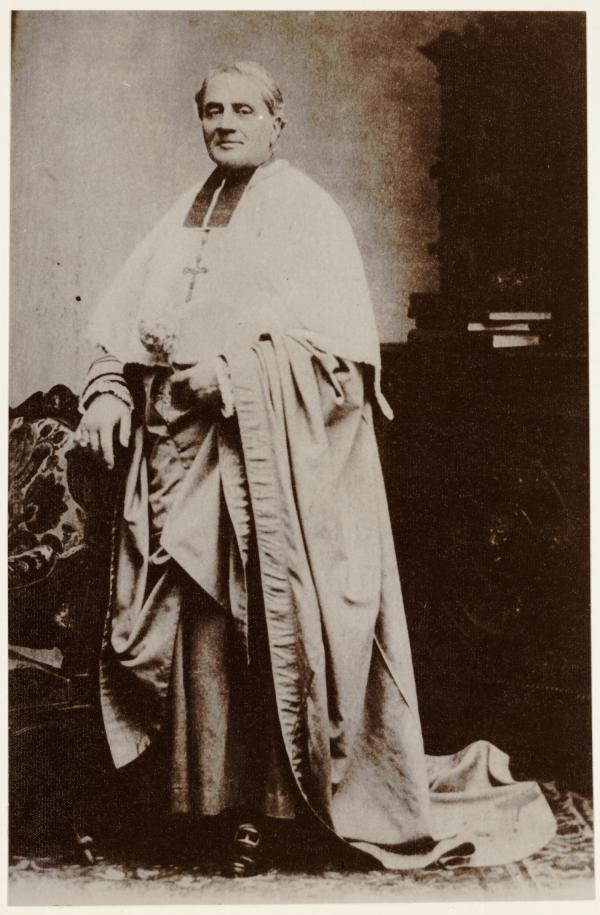
Pierre-Hector Coullié, Archbishop of Lyon

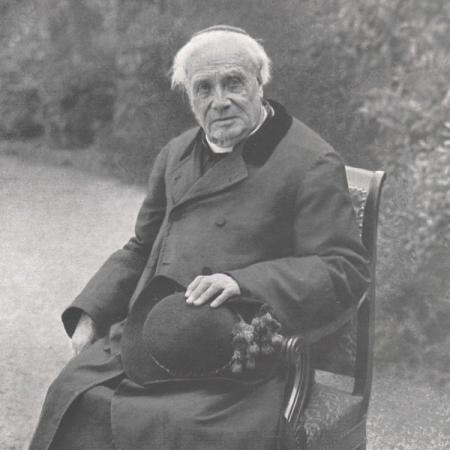
Louis-Joseph Luçon, Archbishop of Reims

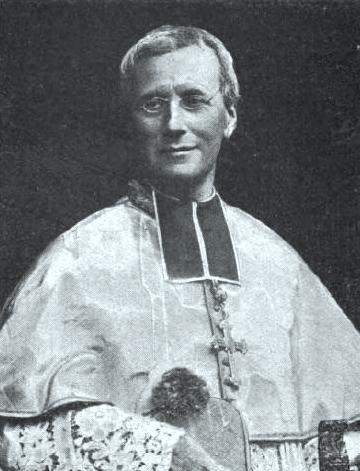
Pierre-Paulin Andrieu, Bishop of Marseille

==== Content and publication ====
In the Déclaration, the French Catholic hierarchy explicitly referenced Doumergue's proposed legislation and elaborated on its approach regarding families' authority over their children's education. The Déclaration was a result of the government's declaration that it no longer acknowledged the bishops by referencing the 1905 law that specifies that the republic does not recognize any religion. Consequently, Catholic ecclesiastics had to communicate their voice through a different medium. The signatories expressed in a stern tone their disappointment in the State's failure to fulfill its promises and its objective to eliminate family control over school neutralityː

"That numerous hindrances have been placed, in recent years, on the exercise of your rights in matters of teaching and education, you know only too well, and we do not think, at this hour, to take up this painful subject again. At least, the law contained a promise which, if faithfully kept, gave you relative securityː it proclaimed the strict neutrality of the school [... ]ː "Parents who entrust their children to the State have the right to demand that their beliefs and intimate feelings be neither opposed nor offended by aggressive teaching, and, on the other hand, the State has too often and too sincerely demanded the collaboration of the family in the work of schooling to repudiate its solicitude and even its control". In the same place, the principle is asserted, without any hesitation whatsoever, that "guarantees must be granted to fathers to enable them to obtain reparation for faults committed by members of the public education system in the performance of their duties". [...] Have these commitments always been honored in the past? No. Would the new bills, if passed, help to honour them better in the future? Even less so. [...] Fathers of families, read the provisions of these precautions [...], and you will see that any of you whose conscience has been wounded by the text of a textbook imposed on your child can lodge a complaint with the "competent authorities", and even refer the matter to the Minister of Public Instruction. [...] What chance is there that these "authorities" will themselves overrule you, by recognizing the merits of your complaint? And when the case is brought to his attention, will the Minister of Education take up the father's cause? How can we hope for that? We don't have to look far to justify our doubts and worries."

After reviewing the content of the proposed Doumergue laws and considering the impact they would have on Catholics dealing with irreligious teachings, the French episcopate presents recommendations for families, specifically fathersː

"Such legislation amounts to the expropriation of the family and the confiscation of the childː of all tyrannies, it is the most odious. Fathers of families, we had to bring this painful state of affairs to your attention. [...]

Let the State offer to help you in your task as natural educators, let it supplement you if necessary, but let it never think of supplanting you. If it opens schools, if it draws up curricula, if it indicates what knowledge, in the judgment of competent people, should be, as it says, "the intellectual viaticum necessary for the development of the human person", we accept it. [...] What we ask is that in all the forms of its initiatives and assistance, it never loses sight of the primordial right of the family. [...]

[W]hile the work of the school is accomplished primarily in your name, by a delegation from which you are never absent, your right to supervise it is absolute. Let us add that, given the circumstances in which we find ourselves, if you have the possibility of choosing between several schools for the education of your children, it is your duty to prefer the one that will give the best guarantees of respect for all your rights. In any event, you will supervise the public school, employing all legal means to keep it in compliance with what, for want of a better expression, we'll call honest neutrality. That if, God forbid, it should persist in being a danger to your children's faith, you should - and we shall never cease to remind you of this and to support you in the defense of your rights - you should forbid them access to it, at the cost of any consequences that may result from the act of conscience you would thus have accomplished, as good Frenchmen and good Christians."

The Déclaration was published in the Catholic press on September 12 and read in all French churches on Sunday, September 20, 1908. Despite its clear condemnation of the proposed legislation, it demonstrated some restraint by maintaining a preference for republican schools; emphasizing their neutrality, which it intended to uphold at all costs; and urged families to monitor them. The statement does not address free schools in depth, a stance that might change over time.

=== Development of a new doctrine (1908-1909) ===
The Catholics' determination and the Republican majority's divergent views swiftly thwarted Doumergue's plans. After a period of lull, the school year of 1908-1909 progressed relatively calmly. Nonetheless, the situation remained unstable.

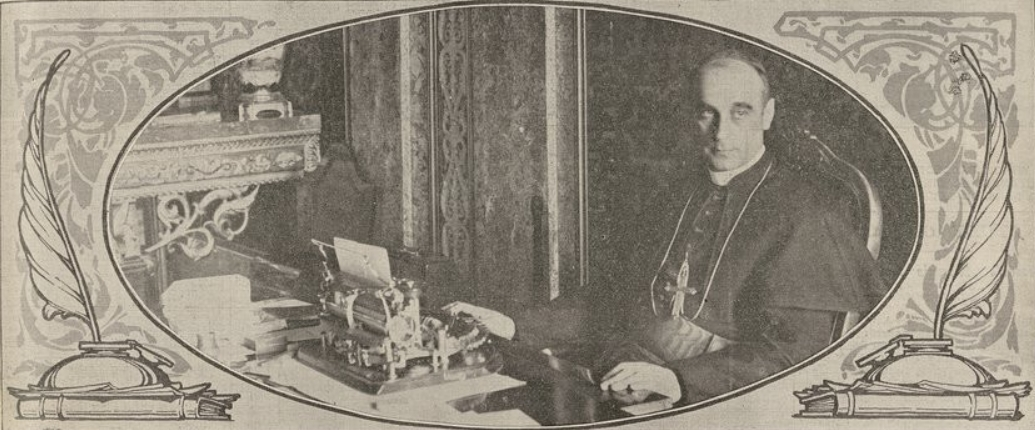
Merry del Val in his office at the Vatican, 1906.

As the Déclaration was drafted hastily in response to increased tensions between the government and French Catholics, it had no chance to engage in the detailed contemplation of the relationship between schools and the Church. Rome and the French episcopate understood the significance of defining the Church's stance on education, and a new doctrine emerged. It was Rafael Merry del Val, the most trusted advisor of Pius X, who took the lead. During a period of religious upheaval throughout Europe, Cardinal Merry del Val remained steadfast in his rejection of modernism, which posed a challenge to religious traditions and Catholic doctrine. Cardinal del Val, the leader of the opposition to Aristide Briand's Law of Separation, refused to concede to any compromises from the Holy See. In the context of the battle over schools, he would once again display his unwavering strength by firmly asserting his authority over the French bishops who sought to promote the neutrality tinged with hostility of secular institutions.

==== Merry de Val's consultation of the French episcopate ====
On October 14, 1908, Merry del Val wrote to the authors of the Déclaration and stated that the Pope would be pleased if they conferred with the three metropolitan bishops of France (North, South-East and South-West) to study the measures to be taken regarding the school question and refer them to the Holy See. The correspondence was aimed at establishing clear communication lines between both parties. The Secretary of State proposed regional or provincial meetings to facilitate the exchange of views but excluded the possibility of a general assembly since it would be uncontrollable. Additionally, he proposed a plan of action: "Undoubtedly, the episcopate will recognize that school neutrality is harmful and deceptive, and therefore, an energetic struggle must be waged against it."

The consultation, led by Cardinal Luçon, Archbishop of Reims, started in November 1908 with the objective of proposing a practical solution to the challenges faced by Catholics. Upon the consolidation of the responses from different French bishoprics, it was concluded that they advocated for free schools by stating that they had significantly contributed to the proliferation of Christian households in France. Although maintaining boys' schools was more challenging and might not always yield desired outcomes, it was crucial to have them to shape confident and brave Christians. Therefore, all necessary sacrifices should be made to sustain both types of schools. As for the responsibilities of the parish priest towards parishioner parents, if there was no available free school, families had to be urged to take all necessary measures to address the issue of secular schools displaying anti-Catholicism. If a free school was available, parents had three options for enrolling their children in school. If the secular school was irreligious, parents had to enroll their children in the free school or to risk being denied absolution unless the mother was unable to enroll because of her husband's wishes. If the secular school was acceptable but not exceptional, the parish priest would suggest enrolling in the free school without making it mandatory. If the secular school was of high quality, parents were free to choose between either school.

==== First draft of pastoral letter ====
Despite the bishops' firm position, Cardinal Merry del Val was dissatisfied with the findings of the consultation since it did not condemn secular education, and in some instances, it was even deemed "good". To combat what he viewed as weakness, on December 2, 1908, he issued new directions to inspire the bishops to take decisive action. In particular, the speaker urged the episcopate to scrutinize school textbooks and publish a joint letter condemning those who challenged Catholic religious doctrines. To enhance efficacy, supervision of this undertaking was entrusted to the four French cardinals who had composed the Déclaration.

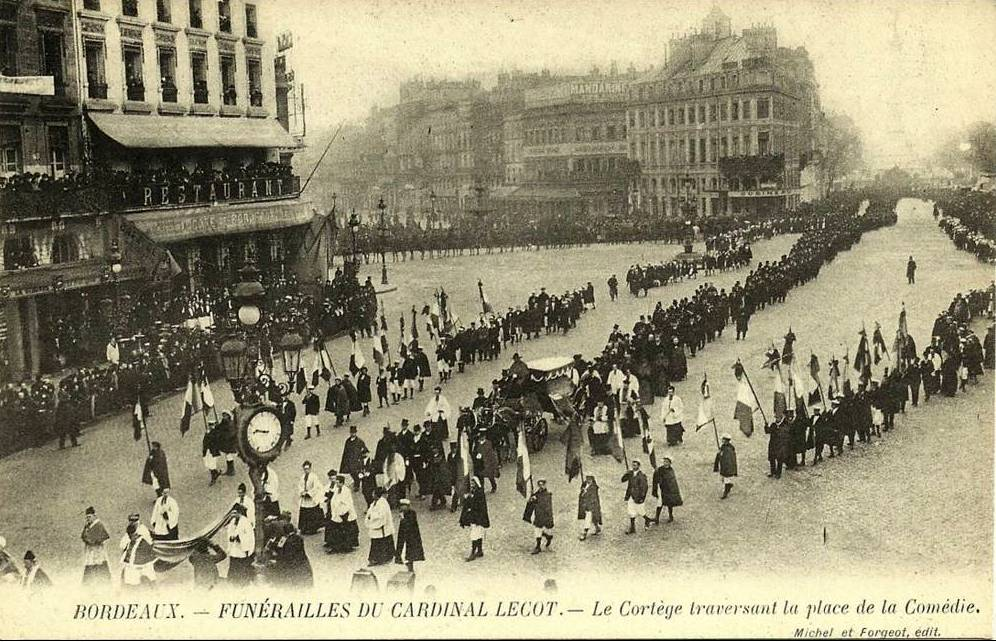
Funeral of Cardinal Victor Lecot.

The three cardinals proceeded with their work, as Cardinal Lecot's death left them with no other choice. Several Catholics attended the funeral of the late cardinal, which was closely monitored by the police, who anticipated possible unrest. Cardinal Coullié informed Merry del Val on December 21, 1908 that it was best to gain the French bishops' complete assent to adequately prepare for the attack against secular schools and cautioned against a one-sided directive from Rome. With Merry del Val's approval, Cardinal Coullié had the manuals analyzed by each bishop and co-ordinated provincial assemblies for their discussion. Although the Paris assembly was quite moderate and found that only a few sentences in the manuals were in direct conflict with Church doctrine, the Besançon assembly identified several hazardous manuals, especially those that taught historyː

"All these works of history noted as dangerous or to be absolutely proscribed, are of Protestant or rationalist inspiration. If they do not always attack the Church openly or directly, they never miss an opportunity to discredit it or to cast suspicion and contempt on it, its role and its action. They systematically conceal the material, moral, intellectual and social services it has rendered to humanity. [They exalt the Reformation of Luther and Calvin, [...] the philosophers of the 18th century [...]. The history of the monarchy, like that of the Church, is odiously disguised, the crimes of the Revolution cautiously passed over in silence. History as taught in these textbooks is indeed the most odious conspiracy against the truth and the most infernal enterprise to de-Christianize childhood."

On the contrary, all assemblies recommended not to deny First Communion to children who attended substandard schools. They expressed hesitation about drafting a joint letter and were apprehensive that the people might misconstrue the episcopate's intentions. They preferred to address each conflict individually and were concerned that Rome would impose a decision without consulting them first. Mgr Coullié had a difficult task ahead in reconciling the prejudices of the French episcopate with the injunctions of Merry del Val. As a result, his draft letter was not finalized until March 1909.

=== The bishops' Lettre Pastorale (September 1909) ===
In April 1909, French cardinals convened with Merry del Val in Rome to commemorate the beatification of Joan of Arc. The initiative faced intense criticism by the Secretary of State of the Holy See and was eventually renounced and suppressed, which left behind only the catalog of works to be prohibited. Following Merry del Val's guidance, the cardinals stayed in Rome to revise the joint letter and ultimately disregarded the French episcopate. According to André Lanfrey, the Lettre pastorale des cardinaux, archevêques et évêques de France sur les droits et les devoirs des parents relativement à l'école, the final version essentially reflects the views of Cardinal Andrieu. It was then signed by all bishops, archbishops and cardinals of France.

Dated September 14, 1909 and published in La Croix on September 28, the statement was read from the pulpit on Sunday, October 3. It reaffirmed the right of families to direct their children's education and rejected the ideas of children's rights and the State's monopoly on teachingː

"The family is a society that God established and that man cannot destroy. Whatever certain philosophers, imbued with the crude errors of paganism, may say, it must live within the State, without merging with it. It is to you, fathers and mothers, that children belong, since they are bone of your bones and flesh of your flesh, and it is you who, having given them the life of the body, have the imprescriptible right to initiate them into the life of the soul. In the work of education, the State can help and supplement you, but not supplant you. It is wrong to invoke the so-called right of the child to justify its claims. The child has no right that can prevail against the rights of God, in whom we are obliged, from the awakening of our reason, to recognize our principle and our end; he has not, in particular, the right to refuse until the age of eighteen, according to the theory of a sophist who was a bad father, the religious instruction that parents are obliged to give him or to have given to him."

It strongly criticized the principle of neutrality in public schools and called it a "deplorable error", a "perfidious design." and "a principle that is false in itself and disastrous in its consequences:"

"Is it not permissible to see in the suppression of all religious teaching in schools one of the main causes of the deep-seated evil from which France suffers, and which affects the family, morality and patriotism all at once?"

Schoolteachers, although susceptible to socialism and secularism, were accused of abusing their pupils' trust and outraging their faith through dangerous textbooks and teachings. The French episcopate recommended families to exercise careful vigilance regarding public schools. It was essential to become familiar with the teachers who oversaw the institution and the type of education that they provided. Nothing was to escape attention when it came to what is placed in the hands and under the eyes of children, including books, notebooks and pictures. It was important to exercise control over those items by ensuring they are properly monitored at all times.

==== Condemning textbooks ====
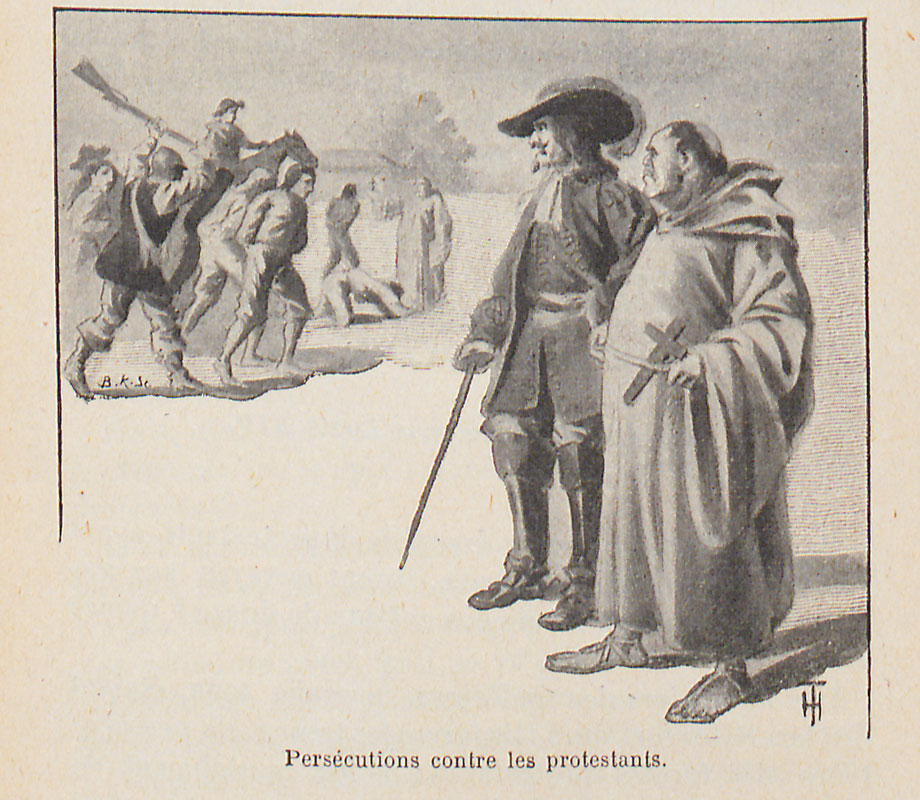
The Catholic Church lending its support to the dragonnades. Illustration from Leçons de morale by Albert Bayet.

Fourteen textbooks were prohibited by the bishopric in a list attached to the Lettre Pastorale:

- La morale à l'école by Jules Payot;
- Cours de morale by Jules Payot;
- Leçons de morale by Albert Bayet;
- Manuel d'éducation morale civique et sociale, by E. Primaire;
- Manuel de lectures classiques, by E. Primaire;
- Éléments d'instruction civique, by Alphonse Aulard;
- Histoire de France, by E. Devinat;
- Histoire de France, by Gauthier and Deschamps;
- Histoire de France, by Aulard and Debidour;
- Histoire de France, by Léon Brossolette; (Note: Father of Pierre Brossolette.)
- Histoire de France, by Guiot and Mane;
- Histoire de France, by Calvet;
- Histoire de France, by Rogie and Despiques;
- Petites lectures sur l'histoire de la civilisation française, by Rogie and Despiques.

Families were ordered to withdraw their children from schools where such textbooks were in use on pain of being denied absolution.

Some textbook covers condemned by the Lettre Pastoral

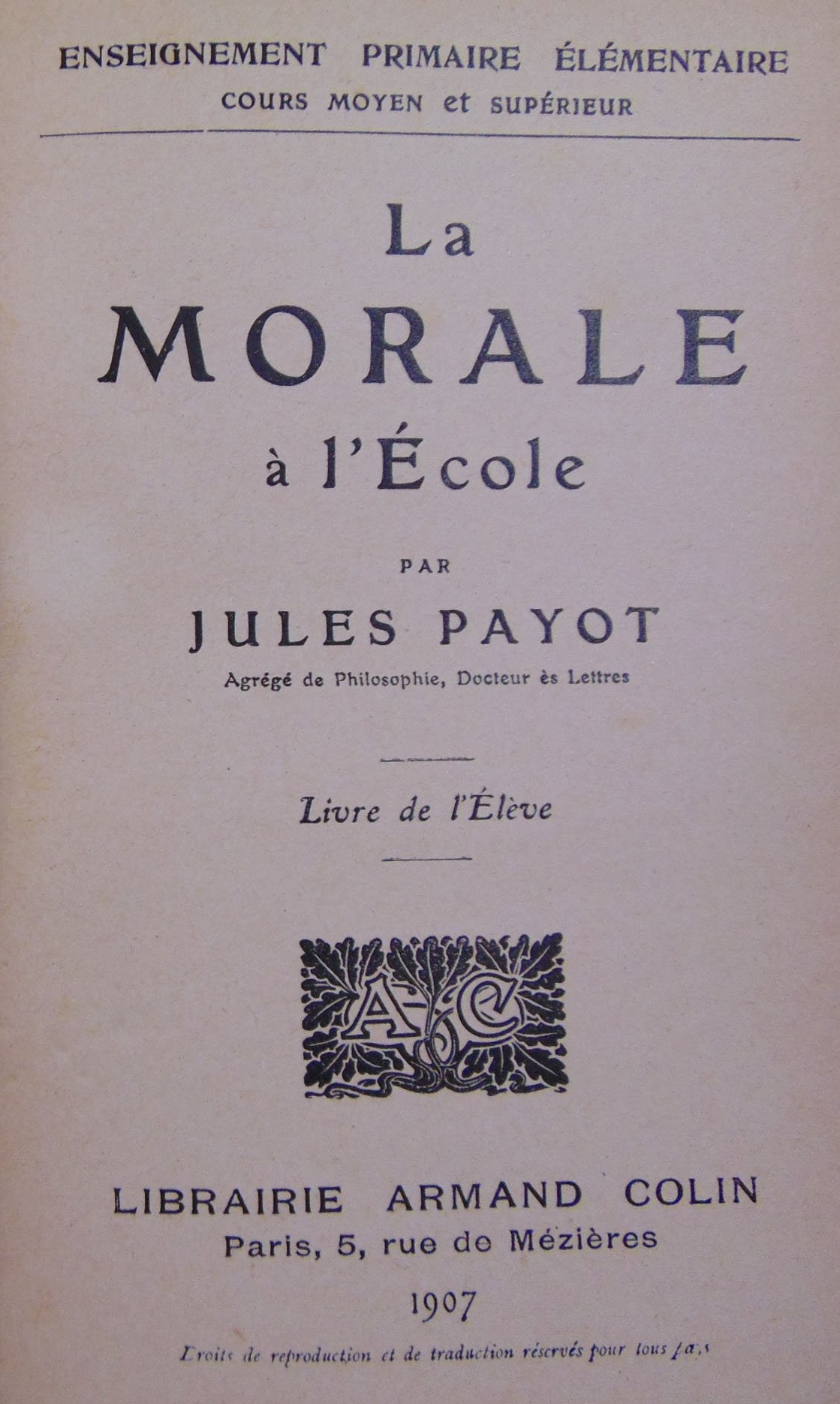
La Morale à l'école, by Jules Payot.

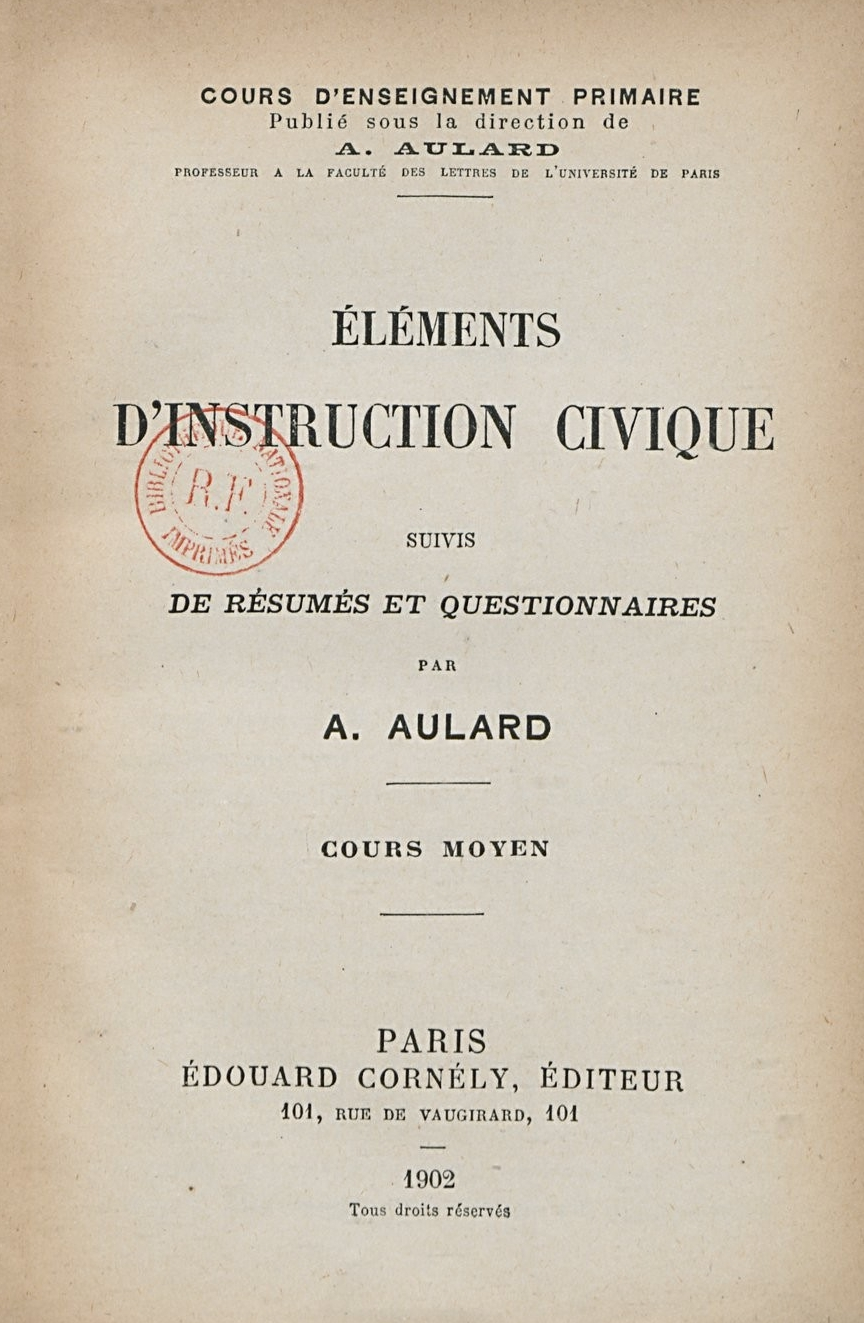
Éléments d'instruction civique, by Alphonse Aulard.

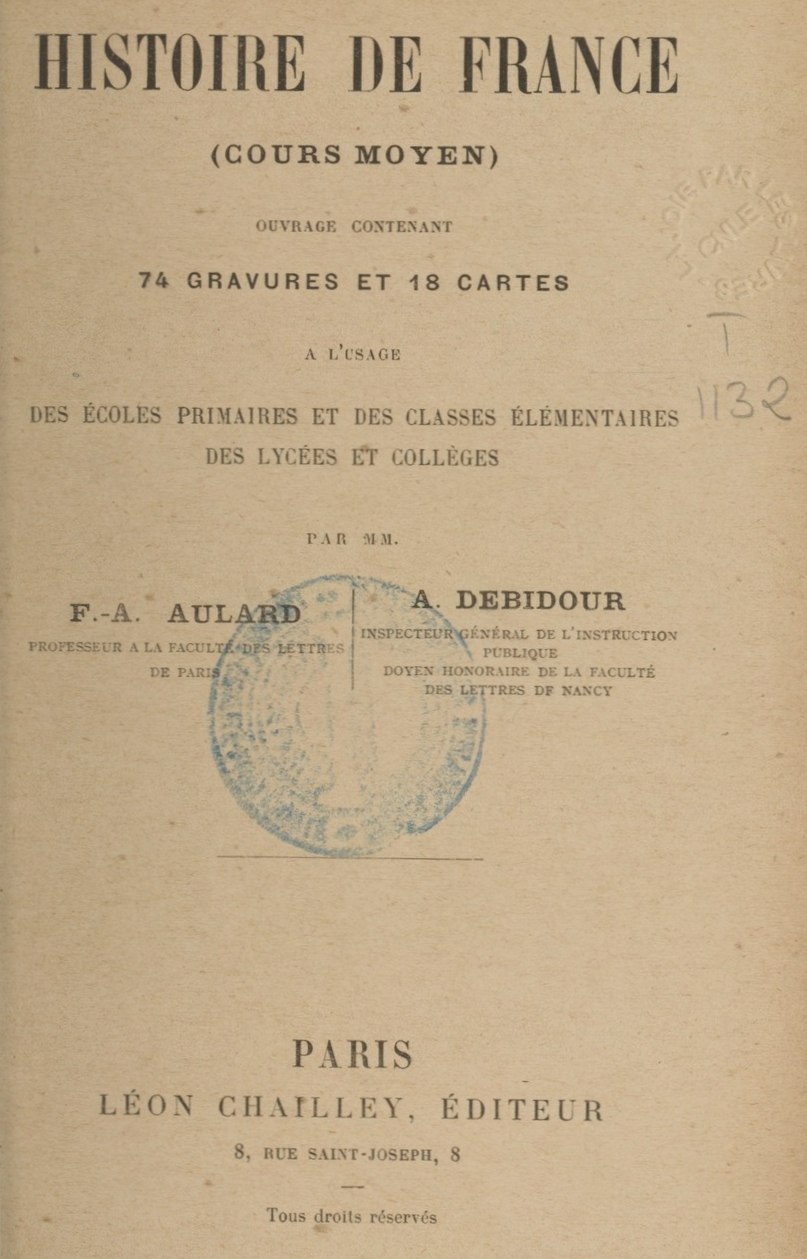
Histoire de France, by Aulard and Debidour.

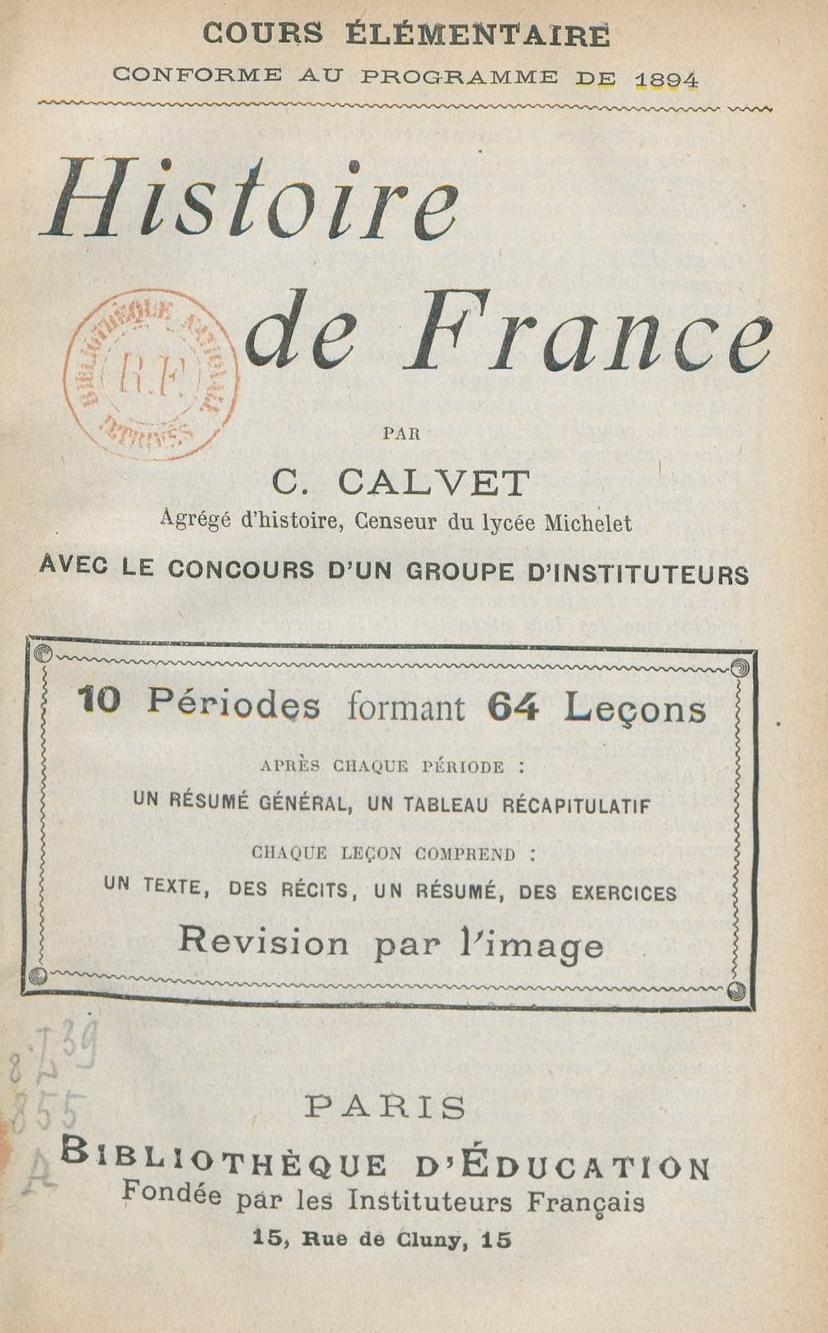
Histoire de France, by C. Calvet.

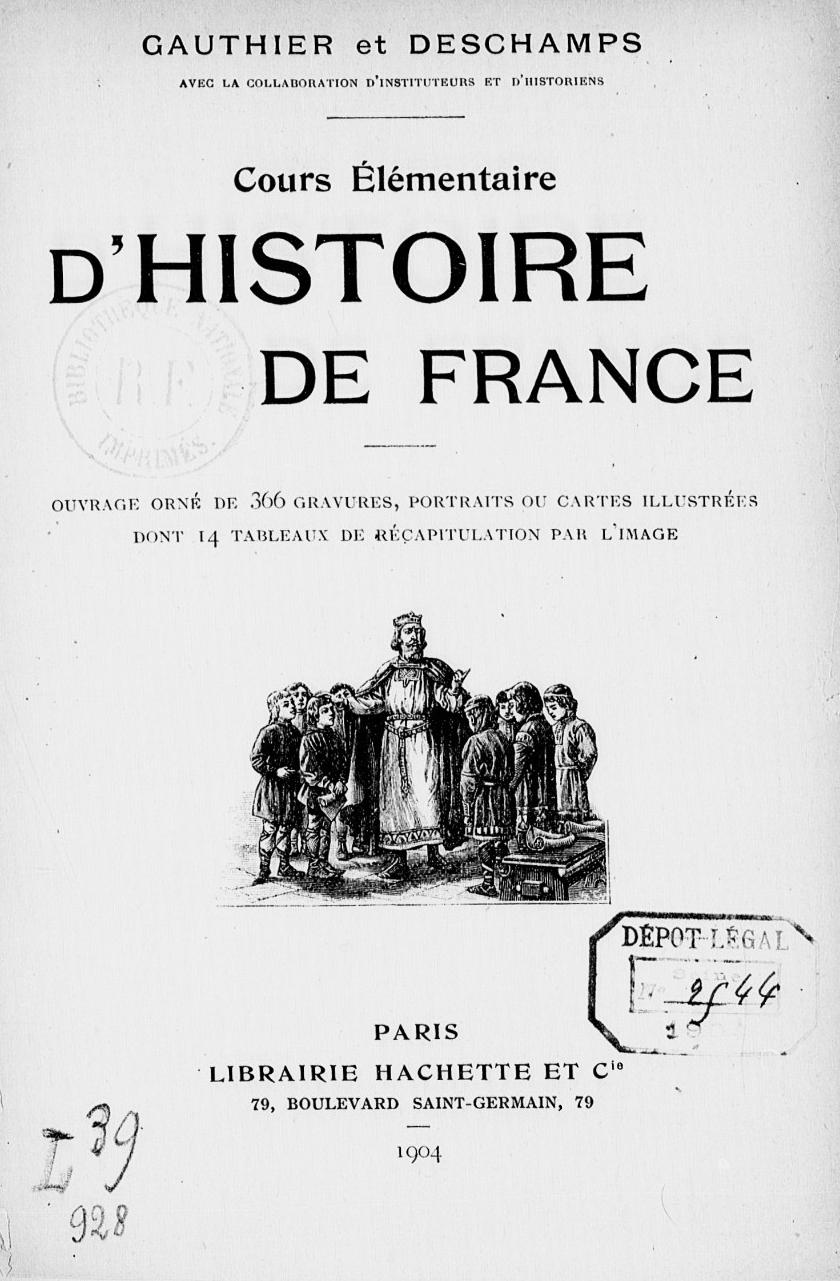
Histoire de France, by Gauthier and Deschamps.

==== Support for free education ====
The letter unabashedly gave preference to the "free or Catholic school" of which it stated the followingː

"The free school is one in which the teacher possesses, along with the necessary pedagogical attitudes, the happiness of believing and the courage to live according to his or her beliefs [...]. The Christian school is one in which the teacher places religious science at the top of his curriculum, places books of perfect orthodoxy in the hands of his pupils, and creates around them an atmosphere conducive to the blossoming of their faith and virtue. Your children should find this school everywhere, and the State would be obliged, in good justice, to make it available to families."

It also thanked the laity involved in free schools, lavished praise on the Congregationalists of "our beloved teaching communities" and invited the wealthiest to finance the foundation of Christian schoolsː

"Let those favored by fortune set to work without objecting to the new burdens that a disastrous law, the Law of Separation, has imposed on them."

Finally, the bishops placed the fight against neutrality in schools under the patronage of Blessed Joan of Arc.

=== Second Textbook War (1909-1911) ===
The condemnation of textbooks in the Lettre Pastorale ultimately led to a period of school unrest referred to as the "second textbook war," with the first conflict occurring after the enforcement of the March 28, 1882 law. School unrest reached its apex during the winter of 1909–1910 though it differed in intensity across regions. Specifically, rural areas were more heavily impacted than urban ones.

In addition to banning textbooks and schools suspected of irreligion, parish priests took action by instructing children to tear up or to burn the condemned materials. As early as September 1909, bishops encouraged the public recitation of the following statement daily: "From schools without God and teachers without Faith, deliver us Lord!" This had a significant impact during the First Belgian School War. Finally, they threatened to refuse absolution or sacraments (such as baptism and First Communion) to families who persisted in sending their children to "bad schools." For example, in Côtes-d'Armor, the prefect complained about Mgr Jules-Laurent-Benjamin Morelle's actionsː

"I must draw your attention, in a special way, to the ardent campaign waged against secular schools in my department by the Bishop of Saint-Brieuc and his clergy. Not content with encouraging the creation of numerous patronages everywhere, with subsidies abundantly provided by our adversaries, the priests are constantly going into the communes and from house to house, declaring in the most formal manner to parents that they will refuse to let their children take First Communion if they continue to attend secular establishments."

==== Role of organizations ====
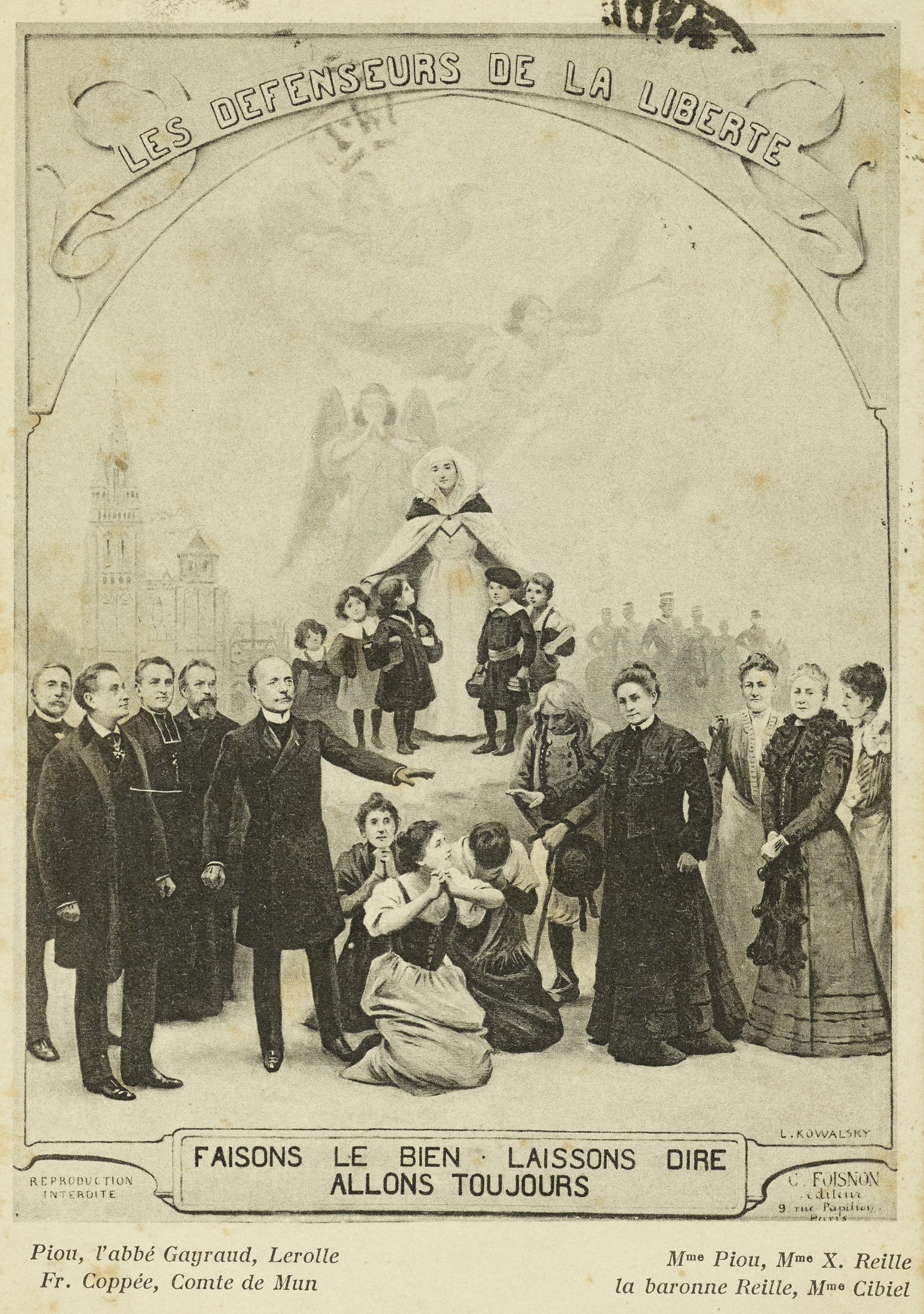
Postcard from 1903 featuring Baroness Geneviève Soult de Dalmatie, future president of the Ligue patriotique des Françaises, alongside other Catholic personalities.

Compared to the first "Textbook War," the new conflict saw increased involvement from associations alongside the clergy. Notably, the Société générale d'éducation et d'enseignement (SGEE) adopted a more aggressive stance than in 1882–1883 by strongly advocating for the rights of fathers. However, the organization also faced competition from other fathers' associations, which rapidly gained prominence. Since 1907, the latter group, led nationally by Désiré Gurnaud, had advocated for the "civic right of school supervision", embraced school neutrality, welcomed all religious affiliations and maintained a careful separation from the Catholic hierarchy. It made clear that clergymen would not hold leadership positions. Gurnaud's sentiment was encapsulated in the following statement:

"Every citizen has a right of control and supervision over public affairs, from which the school cannot escape. [...] Isolated, timid, resigned to suffering in silence the affront he didn't dare raise, or ill-informed of the lessons of the school, or imprisoned by his duties in a State which, all too often, in exchange for the bread it gives, demands the gift of conscience, the father of the family hesitated to assert his right."

On the other hand, conservative members of the SGEE believed that mobilization ought to be overseen by the episcopate, the sole authority that was entrusted with assessing the alignment of instruction with Church doctrines. In opposition to Gurnaud's authority, they founded a competing group, the General Union of Catholic Associations of Heads of Families, in early 1911. With that organization as their umbrella, they consolidated all denominational mobilization efforts and obtained the backing of the episcopate, as Mgr Émile Chesnelong (Note: Son of Charles Chesnelong, one of the founders of SGEE.) supported associations that were "Catholic in their membership and goals, specifically advocating for the respect of our Catholic faith in public education." Together with the Popular Liberal Action, who, prompted by Jacques Piou, initially supported Gurnaud, they maintained control of the associative arena.

Among the other organizations involved and that came under their sphere of influence were the Ligue des femmes françaises (LFF), the Ligue patriotique des Françaises (Note: A spin-off from the French Women's League.) (LPF), and the Association catholique de la jeunesse française (ACJF). Women played a pivotal role in the activism within schools. The effectiveness of lay mobilization was largely attributed to the integration of those organizations, which facilitated the coordination of activities such as fundraising, writing and distributing leaflets; distributing the newspaper La Croix; and hosting conferences and discussion groups to sway the undecided.

==== Regional peculiarities ====
In areas that Catholicism held the strongest influence, community leaders supported the suggestions from parish priests. Certain landowners even went to extremes like blackmailing their employees, including household staff, laborers and farmers, to persuade them against sending their children to non-religious schools. That tactic echoes the tactics used during the initial "textbook war." For instance, on December 31, 1910, the Rennes Academy inspector brought to the attention of the Minister of Public Instruction the following facts:

"The hobereaux, moreover, are coming to the rescue. I have in front of me an autograph letter from one of them, Marquis de Menon, addressed under the date of October 9 to his farmers in the canton of Saint-Aubin-d'Aubigné (arrondissement de Rennes). It readsː "I wish to inform you that there is currently a Christian school for boys in Saint-Aubin. I am very anxious that the children of my farmers should all attend. You will therefore do your utmost to comply with my wishes, and get all your children into the Christian school within the week. I'll make sure I'm informed." Which is to say that the farmer, the farm worker, too, has only two choices, the loss of his livelihood or the enrolment of his children in the Christian school."

Some regions affected by the conflict link their struggle for Catholicism to an historical resistance to centralizing Jacobinism. They included French Flanders, Savoy, and Brittany. In the last, parish priests from Finistère decided to read a Breton translation of the bishops' Lettre Collective, which greatly expanded its audience.

==== Attitude of the civil service ====
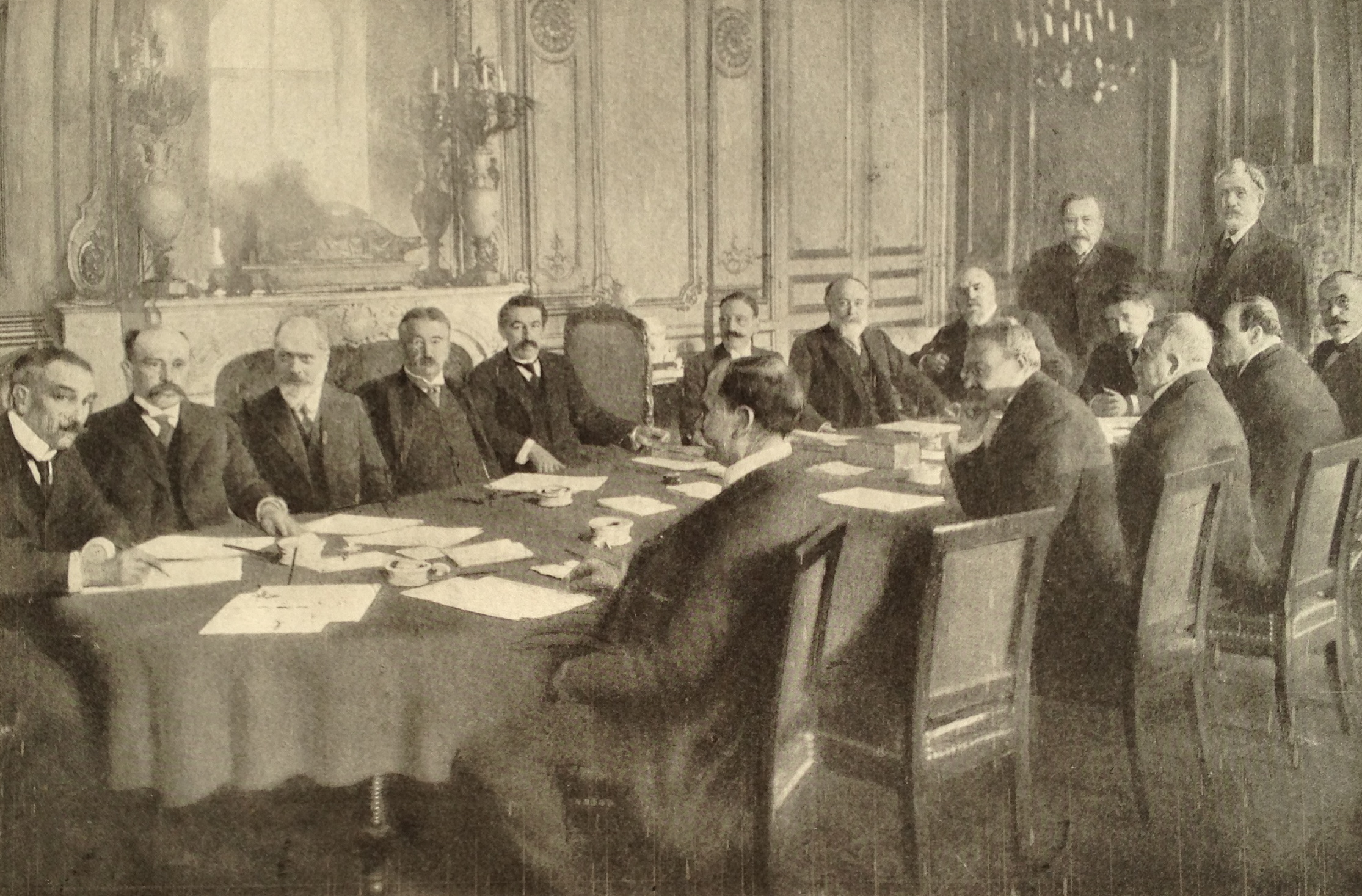
Photograph of the second Briand government. During the two successive cabinets he formed, Briand held the Ministries of the Interior and Cults from July 24, 1909, to February 27, 1911.

On October 19, 1909, French Prime Minister Aristide Briand, who held the Interior portfolio, requested situation reports from all prefects in response to widespread unrest. The reports provided a detailed description of events in each region, reported the facts and analyzed the local situation with a viewpoint typically hostile towards the Church. For instance, the report released on October 28 by the prefect of the Manche department elaborated on the religious beliefs of the Norman people:

"The Normand is traditionally Catholic, not clerical, not convinced, but nevertheless attached to the secular forms of a religion without the gestures and rites of which he considers life incomplete. He sends his wife, children and household servants to church services, sometimes driving them there and generally waiting for them at the cabarets; but if he's not convinced, he still wants a baptism, a first communion, a funeral. These are all pretexts for meetings, drinking and parties, where bodily satisfactions far outweigh spiritual ones. It is at the time of these various acts, and particularly at Easter, at the time of confessions and, for children, at the time of first communions, that the bishops' struggle and the ardent propaganda that may follow will produce their full and complete effect."

The teachers were determined to persist in their actions. The Amicales d'instituteurs committed to keeping the textbooks that had been condemned by the episcopate, and even suggested that only those textbooks be utilized. They also opted to expel uncooperative students, resulting in 3,000 pupils being excluded from secular schools by February 1910. In response, the parish priests hastily bestowed upon these excluded children the "medal of honor for excluded children."

==== Immediate impact ====
Although the campaign by parish priests and fathers' associations resulted in the removal of offending books from around 50 schools, it also had an unprecedented positive impact on free education. In Vendée, for instance, enrollment in secular institutions declined by 13.5% between July 31, 1908, and July 31, 1911, while Catholic schools saw a growth of 23%.

However, this educational campaign also elicited hostility from the French bishops towards the Democratic Republican Alliance. The leaders of the party, Raymond Poincaré and Louis Barthou, censured the Catholic hierarchy's intransigence.

=== Resumption of the "secular defense" (1910-1914) ===
==== Another bill failure in the Chamber of Deputies ====
In 1910, the Radicals and extreme Left launched a new offensive on secular legislation following the Catholic hierarchy's condemnation of secular schools and promotion of free schools. To achieve this, they revived Gaston Doumergue's proposals and attempted to pass them once again. Parliamentary debates were heated, resulting in genuine oratorical duels between the Catholic deputies and the government's majority.

On January 18, 1910, nationalist politician Maurice Barrès spoke in the Chamber of Deputies with contested textbooks in his possession. He expressed his view that schoolteachers were criticizing Catholic morality without suggesting any alternative except for incompatible secular doctrines like spiritualism, materialism, and utilitarianism. He accused those promoting neutrality in education of degrading centuries of moral delicacies that have been established and proposed a concordat of families to safeguard public schools from the fanaticism of education officials. Three days later, the socialist Jean Jaurès delivered his famous "Pour la laïque" (For Secularism) speech to the deputies in response. He views the Church's opposition to education as a regressive stance that will be eliminated in the progress of modernity. He shares this forecast with Catholicsː

"The Catholic Church can no longer move without moving in the direction of the centuryː either it is obliged to stop, to stand still, to become thereby a retrograde power; or, as soon as it tries to take a step, a gesture, a movement, as soon as it tries to shake the torpor, the routine of a secular and sleeping power, it is in the direction of the spirit of the century that it is obliged to move. And I tell youː whatever you do, either you will perish, or you will make new concessions to science, to democracy, to liberty, so strong that all the children of the fatherland will be able to unite in a common understanding. (Loud applause from the left and extreme left.)"

On March 10, 1910, Henri-Constant Groussau criticized the law of March 28, 1882, in his speech at the Chamber. He argued for "the rights of individual conscience, which cannot be violated by the law." According to him, an act of disobedience by a single person is considered a crime, but when thousands and hundreds of thousands engage in disobedience, it becomes a movement of opinion capable of imposing its will on Parliament. He also threatens to publicize all lawsuits against parents who have withdrawn their children from school: "You can oppress Catholics, but you will never enslave them. Catholics are prepared for anything and fear nothing!"

In the end, the Doumergue laws failed to pass the House. Despite being in the majority, the Republicans were unable to agree on a common position. Some deputies, following Doumergue's lead, advocated for a purely repressive policy and a state monopoly on education. On the other hand, some individuals took a broader view of the problem by suggesting social measures aimed at promoting school attendance. (Note: Jean Jaurès and his Socialist colleagues are among them, as he recalls in the conclusion of his speech Pour laïque ("For the Secular").) Alternatively, they supported a "secular defense" approach that respected families (Note: This is the position of the Democratic Alliance, a center-right parliamentary group.) and allowed for some level of parental expression through school councils.

==== Differences between government and teachers ====
Not all teachers aligned with the government's proposals. Although most members of the Ligue de l'enseignement backed the Doumergue initiatives as they had advocated, the Amicales d'instituteurs opposed the government's legislative push. Émile Glay stated, "Teachers do not have a stake in circumstantial laws that could lead to curbing the secular school's ability to criticize." Jaurès concurred with their viewpoint that State protection of schoolteachers could lead to the need for them to defend themselves against the State.

To demonstrate the autonomy of schoolteachers and their lack of need for State defense, the Amicales resorted to "direct action" and sought assistance from legal experts at the Human Rights League. They ostentatiously disregarded the legal aid offered by the Ligue de l'enseignement. The Amicales filed a lawsuit against the bishops based on a letter from 1909. In February 1910, Cardinal Luçon was convicted by the court of Reims for defamation of the teaching profession. (Note: He was sentenced to a fine of 500 francs, but after World War I, his case was finally dismissed.) The conviction was considered a larger achievement than stalling Doumergue's plans.

==== Radical takeover ====
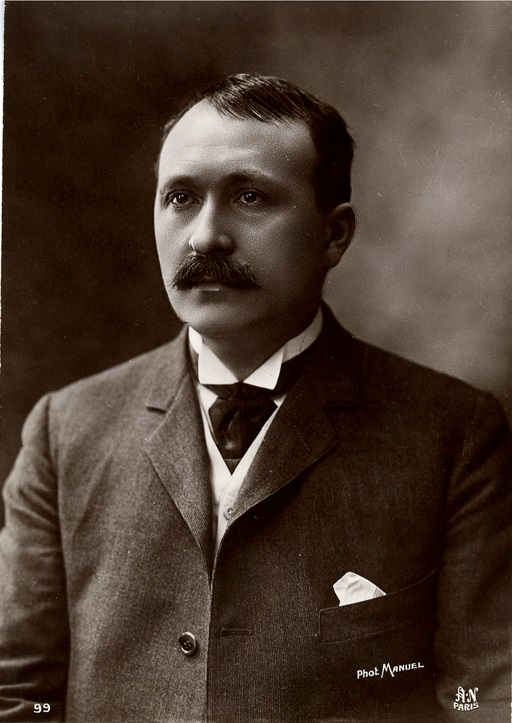
René Viviani, Minister of Education and Fine Arts from December 22, 1913, to June 2, 1914.

In 1911, Théodore Steeg, a Protestant and the newly-appointed Minister of Public Instruction, mandated the compulsory use of indexed textbooks and challenged the episcopate's power. This measure was perceived as an act of revenge because Instruction morale et civiqueː l'homme et le citoyen, authored by his father Jules Steeg, was one of the four textbooks prohibited by the Catholic Church in the initial Textbook War of 1882.

In 1913, Louis Barthou, a leader of the Alliance Démocratique - the most right-wing component of the government majority, used his position as President of the Council to attempt appeasement. He drafted a circular granting parents the option to express their opinion on school textbook selection. However, he ultimately yielded to radicals' protests, and his government collapsed on December 2, 1913, due to their demand for tax reform.

Between January and February 1914, Gaston Doumergue, who succeeded Barthou as president of the council, urged for a revision of his 1908 "secular defense" bill to be put to a vote in the Chamber. Arthur Dessoye once again served as rapporteur. The amended bill required the administration to enforce regular school attendance and imposed fines and imprisonment for those who encouraged school strikes. During the debate, Alfred Brard, a radical, proposed an amendment that would have given the State a monopoly on teaching, but the Chamber rejected it. In the same month, René Viviani, Doumergue's Minister of Public Instruction, managed to get the Chamber to pass his bill on school funding. Unfortunately, the bills were never considered by the Senate because of the outbreak of World War I.

== Consequences ==
=== Assessment of Textbook War ===
On the side of the defenders of the secular school, the outcomes were varied: the "secular defense" legislation was ultimately not enacted, and the most determined did not achieve the teaching monopoly they vocally requested. Nonetheless, the primary school teachers' association, supported by the government, persevered and declined to concede on the textbook issue, even during the peak of the Textbook War. As a result, the prevailing situation endured, and school impartiality (with a hint of irreligiousness) persisted despite the upheaval.

The Holy See deemed that achievement significant. The French episcopate consented to endorse the theory advanced by Mgr Merry del Val, with Pius X's backing, that school neutrality is reprehensible. That enhanced the position of the independent school, which had long been a prioritized concern of the Catholic hierarchy. Between 1908 and 1913, the enrollment of pupils in free schools increased by 15.3% in Morbihan. Additionally, the Catholic community was invigorated by the resolute actions of ecclesiastics, leading to a mobilization that surpassed the combative spirit of the Inventory quarrel in 1906.

=== Later developments ===
World War I and the accompanying Sacred Union brought an end to political and religious conflicts. However, the school question was not resolved; it had only shifted. The Catholic hierarchy placed its hopes in free schools, rather than secular schools, which had disappointed it with their religious neutrality.

The debate on religious education was reignited in 1924 by the militant secularism of the Cartel des gauches, which prompted opposition from French Catholics and demonstrations by the Fédération nationale catholique. This resurgence of the religious question led to a resounding reaffirmation of French prelates' condemnation of secular schools in the Déclaration sur les lois dites de laïcité in 1925.

Later, conflicts between private and public schools reignited in what has come to be known as the "School War." Initially, there were unsuccessful protests led by public school advocates against the 1959 Debré Law. Then, the 1984 Free School movement, led by private school supporters, opposed the reforms that were proposed by Socialist Minister Alain Savary, who was eventually compelled to retract his plans and step down from his post.

== Sources ==
- Amalvi, Christian (October–December 1979), "Les guerres des Manuels autour de l'école primaire en France (1899-1914)", Revue historique (in French), no. 532.
- Condette, Jean-François (May 2, 2018), Les deux "guerres" des Manuels scolaires dans le Nord et le Pas-de-Calais (1882-1883 et 1908–1910)", in Éducation, Religion, Laïcité (xvie-xxe s.). Continuités, tensions et ruptures dans la formation des élèves et des enseignants, Publications de l'Institut de recherches historiques du Septentrion, coll. "Histoire et littérature du Septentrion (IRHiS) (in French), pp. 407–459, ISBN 978-2-490296-17-0, archived from the original on November 16, 2023
- Déloye, Yves (1994), "Chapitre 5ː Les guerres scolaires", École et citoyennetéː l'individualisme républicain de Jules Ferry à Vichyː controverses (in French), Paris: Presses de la Fondation nationale des sciences politiques, pp. 199–286, ISBN 2-7246-0655-8, OCLC 32818865, archived from the original on May 2, 2018.
  - From Birnbaum, Pierre (November 26, 1991), La citoyenneté au miroir de l'école républicaine et de ses contestationsː politique et religion en France xixe - xxe siècle (in French), Paris: Université Paris I Panthéon-Sorbonne, p. 906, archived from the original on November 16, 2023.
- Lanfrey, André (1991), "L'épiscopat français et l'école de 1902 à 1914", Revue d'histoire de l'Église de France (in French), vol. 77, no. 199, Paris: Université Paris I Panthéon-Sorbonne, pp. 371–384, archived from the original on November 13, 2023.
- Lanfrey, André (2003), Éditions du Cerf (ed.), Sécularisation, séparation et guerre scolaireː Les catholiques français et l'école (1901-1914) (in French), Paris: Université Paris I Panthéon-Sorbonne, pp. 371–384, archived from the original on November 13, 2023.
- Martin, Jean-Paul (2016), Presses universitaires de Rennes (ed.), La Ligue de l'enseignementː Une histoire politique (1866-2016) (in French), Paris: Université Paris I Panthéon-Sorbonne, p. 605, ISBN 9782753551657, archived from the original on November 13, 2023.
- Ormières, Jean-Louis (2002), Éditions Complexe (ed.), Politique et religion en France (in French), Bruxelles: Université Paris I Panthéon-Sorbonne, p. 294, ISBN 9782870279274, archived from the original on November 13, 2023.
- Ozouf, Mona (1982), Éditions Complexe (ed.), L'École, l'Église et la République (1871-1914) (in French), Paris: Université Paris I Panthéon-Sorbonne, p. 294, ISBN 9782020147309, archived from the original on November 13, 2023.
