= Lavieille =

Lavieille is a surname. Notable people with the surname include:

- Adrien Lavieille (1848–1920), French painter
- Andrée Lavieille (1887–1960), French painter
- Christian Lavieille (born 1965), French racing driver
- Eugène Lavieille (1820–1889), French painter
- Marie Adrien Lavieille (1852–1911), French painter
- Marie Ernestine Lavieille (1852–1937), French painter
