= Education of girls in France =

History of women education

The history of girls’ education in France forms part of the broader history of education in France and of female education, while also being closely connected to social structures and, more specifically, to the history of women in the country.

According to the Dictionnaire de l’Académie française, education is defined as the action of raising, forming, and instructing an individual by developing physical, intellectual, and moral qualities. The term derives from the Latin educatio, initially referring to the act of raising animals or plants, and later to instruction and the formation of the mind.

Education is generally understood as the responsibility of parents and of society as a whole. In the case of girls, it has historically been shaped by a broader framework that includes the family and social environment, as well as moral instruction provided by religious institutions and, later, formal schooling, which played a significant role in influencing behavior and social roles.

The history of women in French public education is more frequently approached through the study of women’s participation as educators and professionals within the educational system rather than as pupils.

== Historiography ==
One of the earliest historiographical syntheses on the history of girls’ education in France was produced by the historian Françoise Mayeur in 1988. In 2007, the Franco-American historian Rebecca Rogers observed that this synthesis primarily drew on recent scholarship influenced by social history and women’s history, while giving limited attention to earlier historiographical traditions developed by reformist republicans during the Third Republic. In her own historiographical study published in 2007, Rogers incorporated these earlier works and examined their influence on subsequent research, highlighting changes in the field from the 1990s onward. She also noted that studies on girls’ education within religious congregations tended to be highly localized and, as of 2007, did not provide a comprehensive overview.

The late nineteenth century saw major republican educational reforms that expanded access to schooling for girls, including the creation of dedicated secondary schools, lycées, and teacher-training institutions. During this period, authors such as Octave Gréard and Paul Rousselot, alongside female writers, produced some of the earliest historical accounts of girls’ education. According to Rebecca Rogers (2007), these works generally reflect an anticlerical perspective, a tendency also evident in the early twentieth-century Dictionary of Pedagogy edited by Ferdinand Buisson.

In the first half of the twentieth century, Zénaïde Tsourikoff addressed the topic in her doctoral thesis L'enseignement des filles en Afrique du Nord (1935), which focused on the French colonial context. However, this line of research remained limited in subsequent decades.

Under the Third Republic (1870–1940), alongside works of historical analysis, numerous commemorative publications appeared, as well as institutional monographs and biographies of educators.

From the 1970s onward, research experienced a renewal driven by developments in social history, the history of education, educational sciences, and women’s history, including studies on girls’ education. Historians such as Françoise Mayeur played a significant role in this renewal. During the 1980s, several exhibitions devoted to female education were also organized.

More recently, academic research in history and sociology has increasingly examined the education of girls and boys together, with particular attention to coeducation.

== Antiquity ==
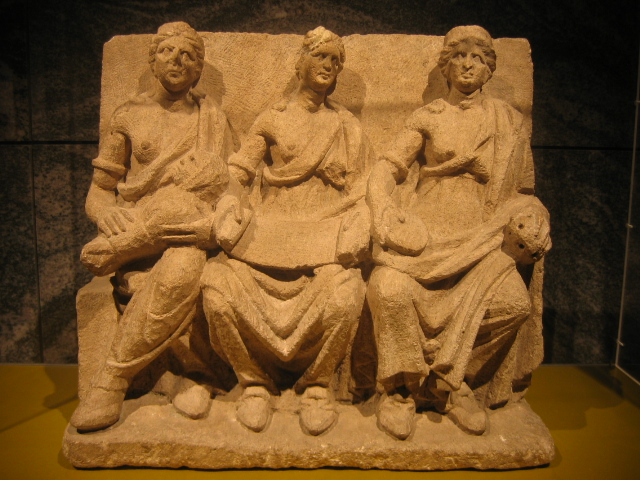
Midwives with swaddling clothes, Vertault.

The role of women in Roman Gaul is documented through archaeological evidence, epigraphic sources, and certain literary works, including Ausonius’s Parentalia and hagiographical texts, which require cautious interpretation.

According to historian Gérard Coulon, early childhood care held a significant place in Gallo-Roman iconography, with practices such as swaddling and the use of feeding bottles attested. Female graves and women’s funerary stelae display recurring types of grave goods, including hairpins, perfume containers, paterae, mirrors, fans, and distaffs, suggesting an early gender-based division of activities. However, some exceptions are noted, such as the presence of soldier figurines in the graves of young girls. Funerary representations of couples, often depicted holding hands or with the woman placing her hand on her husband’s shoulder, are generally interpreted as symbols of mutual trust. Objects associated with literacy, such as the volumen (scroll) or writing tablets, are common attributes of male elites and appear far less frequently in representations of women. Literary and epigraphic sources attest to the presence of women in certain professions, including medicine, as illustrated by Ausonius’s aunt Aemilia Hilaria and by Flavia Hedone, known from an epitaph in Nîmes. Girls from affluent families typically received early instruction within the household, either from their mother or from a tutor, and some entered public schools from around the age of seven. An epitaph from Vienne commemorates Iulia Felicissima, described as a schoolgirl who died at the age of seven years and six months; the inscription suggests a familiarity with Greek culture. Other inscriptions from Vienne refer to adolescents engaged in instruction in the liberal arts. Evidence from cities such as Autun, Marseille, and Bordeaux indicates that some girls may have attended advanced courses in rhetoric and law. However, literary testimony, notably from Ausonius, suggests that such access remained limited and socially conditioned.

Some women, particularly from affluent social backgrounds, participated in mystery cults. In Gaul, women frequently appear as dedicants in the cult of Cybele, notably in connection with the taurobolium, though they only rarely attained the status of priestess. By contrast, women could serve as priestesses in the cult of Isis, but they represented a relatively small proportion of its adherents. In the cults of indigenous goddesses of Gaul, the Germanies, and Raetia, commonly grouped under the name Matrones, women are identified as dedicants in approximately 12% of cases, with an additional 4% of dedications made jointly by couples. Women, most often alongside a spouse, also appear among those making offerings to deities such as Mercury and Jupiter.

== Middle Ages ==
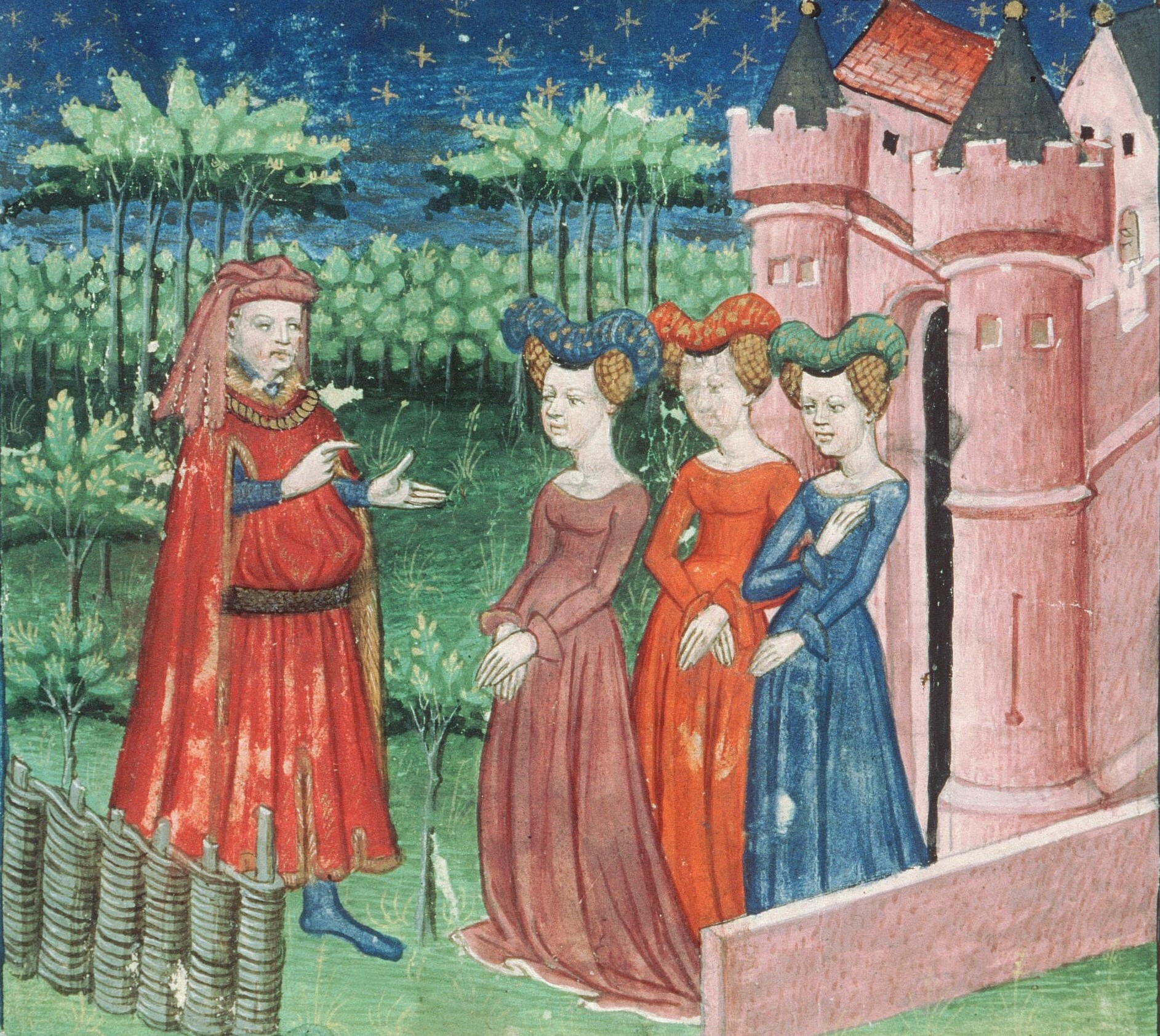
Geoffroi de La Tour Landry teaching his daughters, illumination from a manuscript of the Book for the Instruction of His Daughters, a 14th-century didactic treatise written for young noblewomen.

During the Early Middle Ages, monasteries played a role in the education of female novices. Several abbesses, including Caesaria of Arles, Radegund of Poitiers, Bertille of Chelles, and Anstrudis of Laon, are noted for their educational activities.

One example is the legend of Heloise in the 11th century. She was educated at the presbytery of Saint Christopher's Chapel, which belonged to the Montforts. To avoid an unhappy marriage, her uncle introduced Heloise to the trivium and encouraged her to pursue a course of liberal arts.

In medieval Western Europe, ideals of virtue, piety, and proper conduct imparted to girls are reflected in didactic literature, such as The Book of the Knight of the Tower, written in the late fourteenth century by Geoffroi de La Tour Landry for his daughters.

During the Middle Ages, education was heavily influenced by a theocentric worldview and Christian doctrine, which emphasized instruction according to divine law. Children’s education was primarily religious, with parish priests, monks, and other members of the clergy serving as instructors. Practices, thought, and behavior were generally guided by religious principles.

Access to education varied according to social background. In rural areas, peasant girls typically assisted with domestic and agricultural tasks, including work in the household, garden, or fields. Their education was largely provided by their mothers, who taught them practical skills such as sewing and embroidery, as well as basic religious instruction.

Girls from bourgeois families were educated at home by their parents or sent to convents.

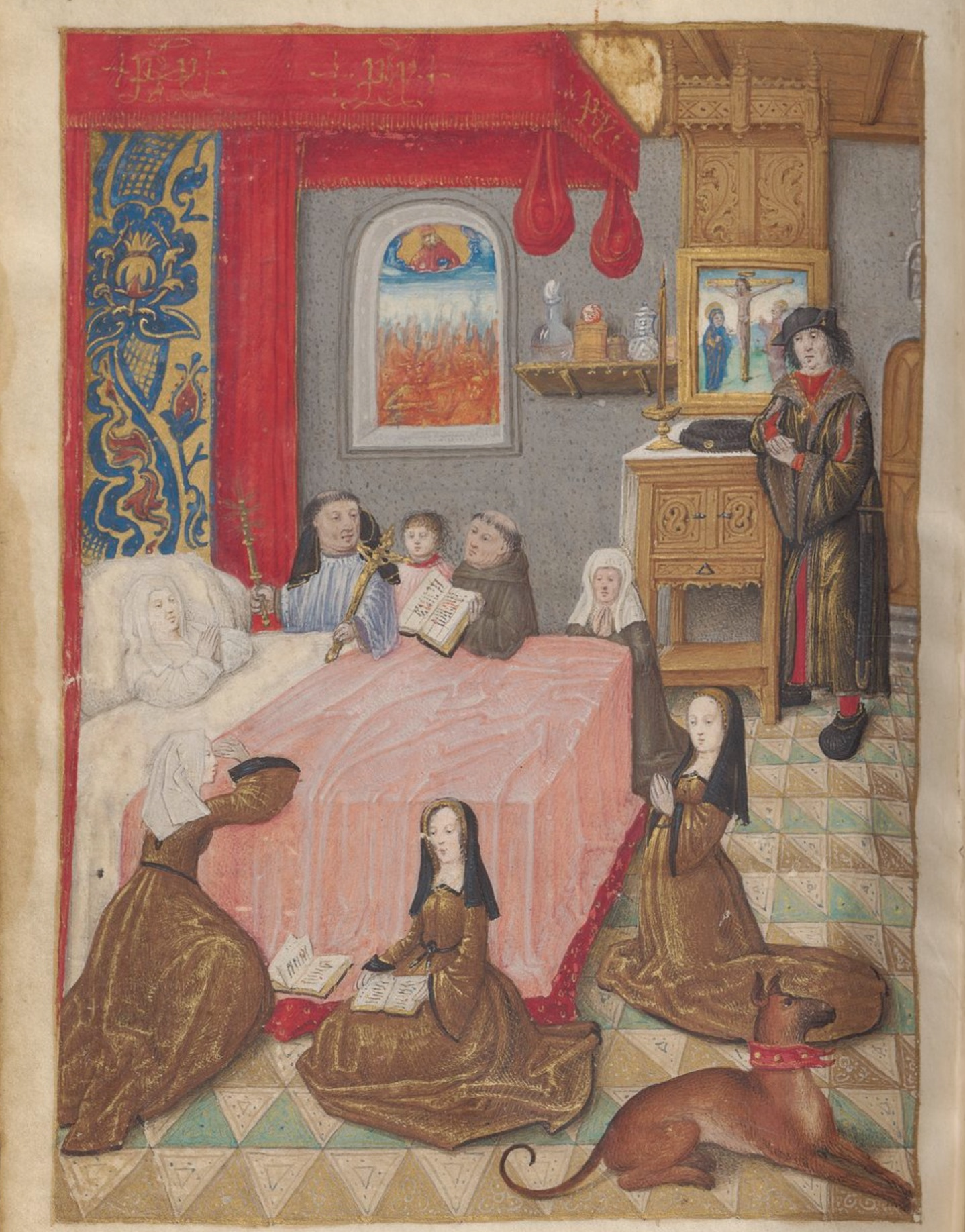
Girls from the upper classes can read devotional books. Dying Woman's Room, illustration by the Master of Antoine Rolin, 1490.

Noble girls typically received instruction in monasteries or from private tutors at their residences. Their education included reading and writing, basic medical knowledge, and musical training, often through singing and playing instruments. They were also expected to be proficient in religious practice and to acquire skills considered appropriate for managing a household.

Schools were open to children of all social backgrounds but tended to favor the education of boys. Between the thirteenth and fourteenth centuries, girls had the right to attend classes in small schools managed by female teachers. Among the educated women of the period, the author Christine de Pizan emphasized that she regarded women and men as having equal intellectual capacity. Having received the customary education of a young woman of her rank, she later faced widowhood and the responsibility of supporting her family, which led her to pursue a writing career. In her work The Book of the City of Ladies (1405), she argued for the recognition of the intellectual equality of the sexes and for the right of girls to receive an education comparable to that of boys.

== Renaissance ==
During the Renaissance, which began in France, as in much of the European continent, in the fifteenth century, about a century after Italy, schooling was above all an instrument of religious education and was meant to be implemented to prevent ignorance in society.

At the beginning of the modern period in Europe, and particularly in France, single-sex schools became more numerous following the Protestant and Catholic reforms, with moral objectives. This was accompanied by the idea that each sex should have a teacher of the same sex. However, in the smallest schools, especially in rural areas, limited resources meant that the two sexes often continued to receive instruction together.

=== An education above all religious ===
In the sixteenth century, the education of girls was primarily oriented toward religious instruction. Religious knowledge was central, and other forms of learning, such as reading, were often taught in relation to the Bible. Girls were also instructed in domestic skills and catechism to prepare them for roles as wives and mothers. Religious education was frequently transmitted from mother to daughter. Only a small number of women received instruction beyond this religious framework. This reflects the prominent role of the Church in education, as well as societal expectations of women as primarily mothers and wives.

=== The social diversification of girls’ instruction ===
During this period, the education of girls varied according to social status. Girls from affluent families could attend fee-paying institutions where instruction included religious education, literacy, and basic intellectual training.

Girls from less wealthy families typically attended free schools, where they received instruction in reading, writing, religious practices, and practical skills for earning a living.

=== The diversification of male and female schooling ===
During the Renaissance, differences existed between the educational paths of girls and boys, primarily due to the shorter duration of schooling for girls. For instance, boarding school education for girls typically lasted two to four years, while for boys it ranged from three to eight years.

As a result, girls’ education was often shorter, irregular, and interrupted by religious observances such as baptism and communion. In contrast, boys generally experienced longer, more continuous, and structured educational programs.

In the fifteenth century, Jean de Gerson, Grand Chancellor of the University of Paris, expressed the view that education for women should be approached with caution.

=== In practice: convents and elementary schools ===
There were two specific places where girls’ education took place:

- Convents represented the most common form of education for girls from noble families. Instruction typically included catechism, reading, and writing. In some cases, such as at the convent of Tarascon, girls could also study Latin. Upon completing their education, they could choose either to remain in the convent or to marry. The quality of education in female monastic institutions improved gradually over the sixteenth and seventeenth centuries.
- Elementary schools: Mixed-gender schools were common in northern France and served girls from impoverished noble families and lower bourgeois backgrounds in rural areas. These schools were criticized by both the Church and humanist thinkers because of their mixed-gender structure, and their number declined during the seventeenth century.
- Parish schools: Education was also provided through small external schools, educational houses, and boarding schools, which were often free of charge.

There are a few documented cases of autodidact women during the Renaissance. Marguerite of Navarre, sister of King Francis I, knew Latin and several other languages, and maintained a small court of artists and intellectuals. Similarly, Princess Marguerite of Valois was fluent in Latin. Another notable example is Juliana Morell (1594–1653) of Avignon, who, encouraged by her father, acquired proficiency in more than a dozen languages at an early age.

=== Humanist thought ===
In 1523, the philosopher and educator Juan Luis Vives published De institutione feminae christianae (The Education of a Christian Woman), a work widely read in European humanist circles. The text emphasized the importance of educating girls while raising the question of what their instruction should include. Vives highlighted modesty as a primary virtue, reflecting contemporary expectations of female behavior, and also advocated for a level of education sufficient to prepare girls for their future roles as wives and mothers.

- make herself pleasing to her husband through her charms and conversation;
- assist him in managing domestic affairs;
- know how to raise her children in a Christian manner.

Vives advocated instruction in reading and writing while also emphasizing domestic skills such as sewing and cooking, including for girls of noble status. He distinguished between tasks associated with the aristocracy, such as embroidery and lace-making, and those more common among the general population, such as spinning and basic sewing. He recommended that girls and boys receive instruction separately. Regarding the study of Latin, Vives expressed caution, suggesting that it be offered primarily to noble girls who demonstrated aptitude.

== Seventeenth and eighteenth centuries ==
In the seventeenth century, questions arose concerning the education of girls, but also about the type of education they required; certain fields were considered of no use to them, such as politics, geography, and history, which were seen as serving those who govern. Moreover, “learned” women still caused concern (see the comedy Les Femmes savantes by Molière).

In his Traité de l'éducation des filles (published in 1687), Fénelon (1651–1715) challenged the prevailing ideas about female education during the seventeenth century. He argued that it was not sufficient for a woman to know only how to manage a household and obey her husband without reflection. According to Fénelon, the education of girls was also necessary and important for the public good, just as the education of boys was, and it required regulation. He maintained that well-educated women could contribute to the common good and were responsible for the moral and intellectual formation of boys, since mothers influence the virtues, morals, and conduct of their children, as well as the education of the women who would later accompany men in adult life. However, Fénelon did not consider women and men to be on the same level. He held that girls’ education should correspond to their aptitudes—sometimes viewed with prevailing societal prejudices—and to the roles associated with their social positions, such as wife, mother, and manager of the household.

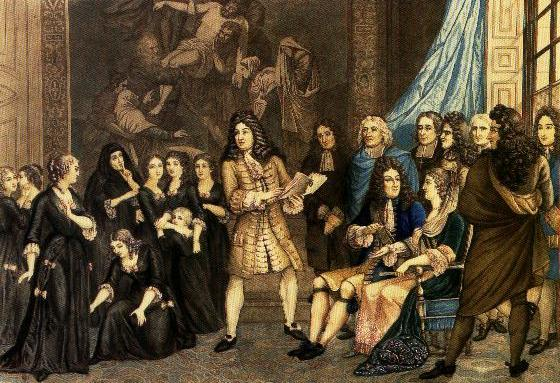
Jean Racine rehearses Esther with the students of Saint-Cyr in front of Louis XIV and Madame de Maintenon. Painting from 1830, unknown artist, Museum of Education in Rouen.

In 1686, at the request of Madame de Maintenon, King Louis XIV established the Maison royale de Saint-Louis, intended for the education of young noble girls. Boarders, selected by Madame de Maintenon from among children of noble families who were impoverished or fatherless, received an education designed to provide general knowledge, household management skills, and training in music and dance. In 1691, the Congregation of the Sisters of Saint Thomas of Villanova opened a boarding school and day school in Saint-Germain-en-Laye.

Debates on the education of girls were ongoing during the Enlightenment. Jean-Jacques Rousseau (1712–1778) argued that women could not be considered equal to men, particularly in terms of education, whereas Denis Diderot (1713–1784) contended that subordinating women to men constituted a form of tyranny.

Between 1786 and 1788, the nun Pauline Pinczon du Sel established a boarding school in Lambesc.

During the French Revolution, the status of women and their access to education were the subject of extensive debate. While some revolutionary female clubs and a few deputies, including Nicolas de Condorcet, advocated for equal education for girls, the majority favored restricting them to domestic roles. The National Convention, however, recognized the need for secular primary education for girls to reduce the influence of refractory clergy. The law of 15 October 1795 established the principle of a public school in every commune, including provisions for girls’ classes.

== First Empire (1804–1814) ==
Under the First French Empire (1804–1814), the education of girls continued to be largely administered by the Church.

=== Primary education ===
During this period, boys and girls were educated in separate institutions.

In 1801, the nun Madeleine-Sophie Barat and the Sisters of the Sacred Heart established a girls’ boarding school in Amiens, followed by a school in Grenoble in 1805, before expanding to other cities across France.

Between 1807 and 1812, Marie-Thérèse-Félicité Binart, a canoness of the Congregation of Notre-Dame, founded a boarding school in Paris, later known as the Convent of the Oiseaux.

The first public institution specifically aimed at educating young girls was established by the decree of 15 December 1805 under Napoleon I: the Houses of Education of the Legion of Honour. These institutions were intended to educate poor or orphaned girls whose parents, grandparents, or great-grandparents, French or foreign, had been awarded the Legion of Honour.

The first legal texts concerning the education of girls were introduced later, during the Restoration.

=== Secondary education ===
In 1808, lycées were forbidden to women and girls.

== Restoration (1814–1830) ==
The Restoration introduced the first regulations relating to girls’ schooling.

=== Infant schools ===
The first infant school, a precursor to the modern nursery school, was established in the Vosges in 1771 by the Protestant pastor Oberlin. It was intended to accommodate children whose mothers were occupied with agricultural work or needlework. The mixed-gender school provided activities such as singing, drawing, peeling cotton, knitting, and learning about plants and their properties. Children spoke the local dialect to prepare for learning French and were introduced to history through educational walks.

This model was later introduced in England and became established in Paris from 1825 with the opening of an infant school on rue du Bac by Miss Pastoret. Additional schools were created by Jean-Denis Cochin, then mayor of the 12th arrondissement of Paris, in 1826 and 1827 on rue des Gobelins and rue Saint-Hippolyte. The expansion of these schools was influenced by the Industrial Revolution, as an increasing number of mothers worked in workshops or department stores and relied on such institutions for child care.

=== Primary education ===
The ordinance of 29 February 1816 did not explicitly address the education of girls but established an initial framework for primary education. Municipalities were encouraged to create primary schools and provide free care for indigent children. To practice as a schoolteacher, individuals were required to obtain a certificate of competence from the rector and a certificate of good conduct from the parish priest and the municipality. Additionally, creating a school required special authorization from the rector. Supervision of primary schools was assigned to a voluntary committee consisting of the parish priest of the canton, the justice of the peace, the head of the collège, and three or four members appointed by the academic rector. These schools were also overseen locally by the mayor and the parish priest. As many pupils were educated within religious congregations, these congregations supplied the majority of teachers.

The circular of 3 June 1819 extended the 1816 ordinance to girls’ schools, which remained outside the University system. Certificates of competence for girls comprised only two levels, compared with three for boys, reflecting a lower formal standard of education.

The royal ordinance of 21 April 1828, issued under Charles X, reaffirmed the rector’s authority to issue certificates of competence. Supervision of schools by Catholic committees was assigned to the arrondissement rather than the canton. In addition to the certificate of competence and a certificate of good conduct, candidates were now required to provide a certificate of religious instruction issued by the bishop or parish priest in order to become a schoolteacher. Schoolmistresses from religious congregations were exempt from the certificate of competence, as letters of obedience were considered sufficient. Consequently, the level of instruction provided by some schoolmistresses was often considered inadequate.

=== Secondary education ===
Before the Third Republic, there was no formal system of secondary education for girls. Some congregational schools and convents provided instruction that approximated secondary education, primarily for girls from affluent families. These schools emphasized accomplishments, moral and religious education, and knowledge considered relevant for their future roles as wives and mothers.

Private courses were also available for urban women seeking to expand their knowledge. For example, the Cours d'éducation maternelle was established in Paris in 1820 by David Lévi Alvarès, who directed it until 1868, after which his son Théodore assumed leadership until 1891.

== July Monarchy (1830–1848) ==
During the July Monarchy, public education for girls expanded significantly. This development was motivated by two main considerations:

Firstly, it was believed that educating girls would contribute to the formation of better mothers, wives, and household managers. The prevailing view was that the moral and intellectual education of boys was linked to the education of their mothers, and that broader instruction for girls would extend beyond the bourgeois elite previously educated primarily in religious settings.

Secondly, the increasing participation of women in the workforce, including in factories and agricultural labor, highlighted the practical need for basic literacy, numeracy, and domestic skills. Providing girls with these competencies aimed to prepare them both for potential employment and for managing household responsibilities.

=== Asylum rooms ===
In 1836, the city of Paris placed asylum rooms under the supervision of a “committee of ladies,” directed by a teacher from the Seine department.

The ordinance of 22 December 1837 established regulations for these asylum rooms throughout France. Private asylum rooms were treated similarly to municipal asylum rooms, which were developing at the time, and were placed under the authority of the Minister of Public Education. They admitted children from approximately eighteen months or two years up to six years and were generally free of charge. The stated objectives included the development of order, cleanliness, and social habits, as well as the preparation of children for moral and religious life. The curriculum combined educational and recreational activities, including basic reading and writing, arithmetic, short prayers, biblical instruction, elementary natural history, and moral or religious songs. Girls also practiced basic domestic tasks such as threading, knitting, tapestry, or netting.

=== Primary education ===
The Guizot Law of 28 June 1833 affirmed freedom of education and established that each municipality, or a group of municipalities with limited resources, was required to provide at least one public elementary school and one schoolteacher. Municipalities with more than 6,000 inhabitants, as well as departmental capitals, were required to maintain an upper primary school. In municipalities without a separate public primary school for girls, these schools were coeducational.

The school curriculum provided for:

- At the elementary primary school (between ages 7 and 9): “moral and religious instruction, reading, writing, elements of arithmetic, elements of the French language, and the legal system of weights and measures.”
- At the upper primary school (between ages 10 and 12): “elements of geometry and its common applications, especially linear drawing and land surveying, notions of physical sciences and natural history applicable to everyday uses, singing, and elements of the history and geography of France.”

Additional courses could be added depending on the needs and resources of localities (for example, the German language in municipalities near the Rhine).

Coeducation in municipal schools was subject to debate and criticism. Measures were recommended to separate girls and boys in the classroom where possible, and to use different entrances or staggered entry and exit times to minimize contact between the sexes.

The draft of the Guizot Law had initially included a section specifically addressing the education of girls, but this was removed and postponed due to the complexity of the issue. The recruitment, remuneration, and supervision of female teachers, as well as the oversight of girls’ schools, continued to be governed by the royal ordinances of 29 February 1816 and 21 April 1828. The school curriculum remained the same for both sexes.

The Pelet ordinance of 22–23 June 1836 introduced specific regulations for female education. It recommended that each municipality establish at least one primary school for girls.

The curriculum for girls’ primary education then provided for:

- At the elementary primary school: “moral and religious instruction, reading, writing, elements of arithmetic, elements of the French language, singing, needlework, and elements of linear drawing.”
- At the upper primary school: “in addition to the aforementioned courses, more advanced notions of arithmetic and the French language, and particularly the history and geography of France.”

The Guizot Law of 1833 required each department or group of departments to establish a primary teacher-training college for male teachers. No equivalent requirement existed for female teachers. Although the prefect of the Seine, Gaspard de Chabrole, had founded a training course for women in 1817, and David Lévi Alvarès later established a course at Paris City Hall attended by nearly five hundred female candidates, the creation of primary teacher-training colleges for girls was formally encouraged by the royal ordinance of 23 June 1836. The first such college was established in Argentan, Orne, in 1838, followed by others in the Hautes-Pyrénées, Jura, Doubs, and Nièvre.

Private schools and boarding schools for girls, as well as convents dedicated to female education, continued to operate alongside public institutions. Although public education expanded for both girls and boys, Church-based instruction remained predominant, particularly for girls. While primary schooling was free for indigent children, it was not yet compulsory and was primarily accessible to children of the petty bourgeoisie who were not required to work in fields or factories. Regulations on child labor in factories and workshops were introduced with the law of 22 March 1841.

In rural families with both sons and daughters, boys were often prioritized for formal education, as they were perceived as more likely to pursue paid work and participate in political or public life. Girls were frequently expected to contribute to domestic tasks, which were considered essential for the household. As a result, their education was often limited and sometimes overseen primarily by the mother.

When girls attended school, their instruction generally focused on elementary primary education. Attendance for girls was often more consistent than for boys, who frequently left school during the agricultural season to assist with farm work, whereas girls could more regularly be excused from domestic duties for schooling.

== Second Republic (1848–1852) ==
=== Asylum rooms ===
Under the Second Republic, asylum rooms were referred to as “nursery schools” for the first time by the decree of 28 April 1848, reflecting the predominant role of women in managing these institutions and their responsibility for the care of young children.

=== Primary education ===
On 15 March 1850, under the Second Republic, the Falloux Law, introduced by Count Frédéric Alfred Pierre de Falloux, required municipalities with more than 800 inhabitants to maintain a school for girls. The law reinforced the provisions of the Guizot Law regarding freedom of primary education and promoted the education of girls, primarily through congregational schools. Female education was traditionally considered the responsibility of women, and the majority of teachers were nuns, as obtaining authorization to teach was more accessible for them. As a result, religious institutions continued to provide education for nearly 70% of girls during this period.

Some representations of schools

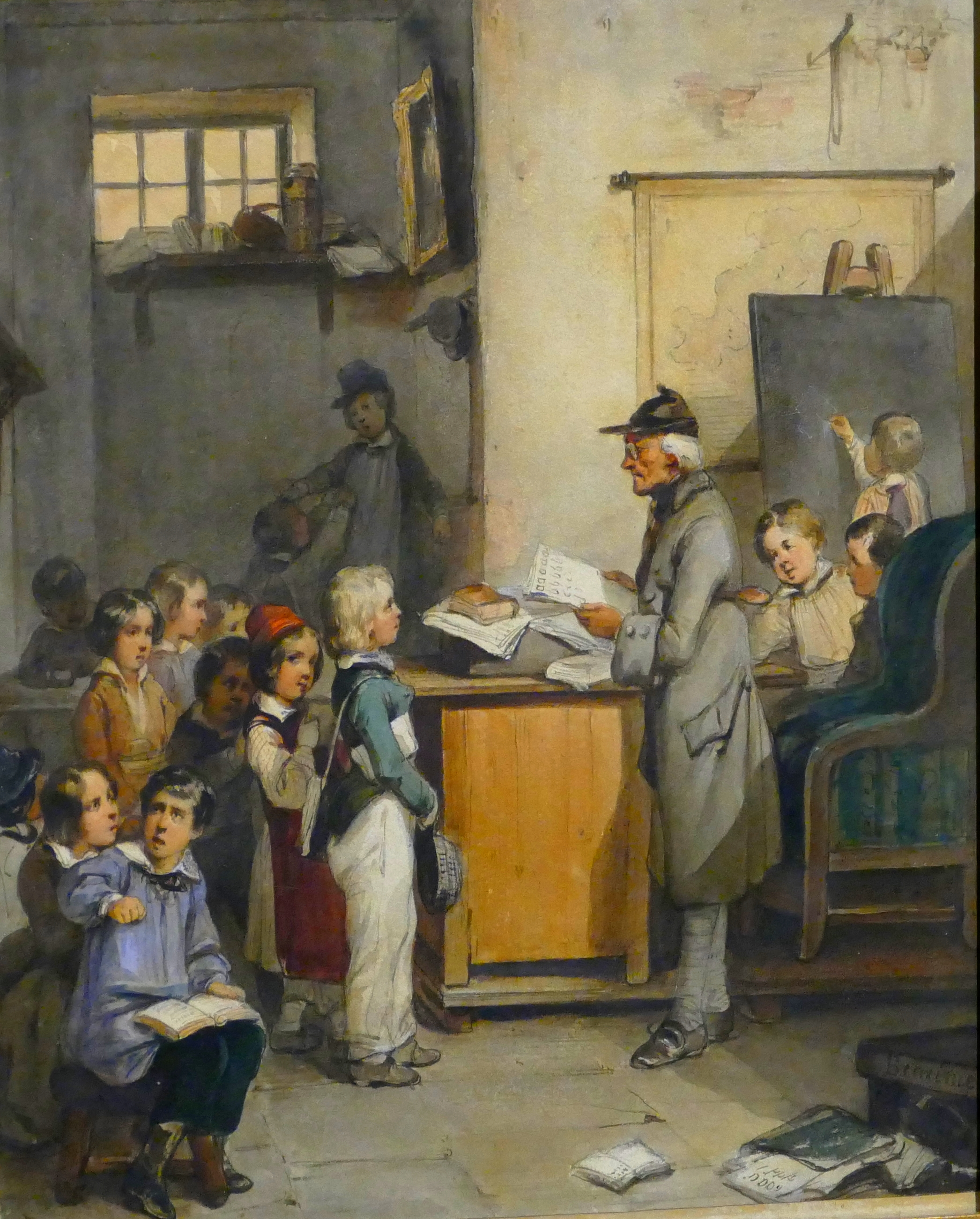
A small school, watercolor by Joseph Beaume, circa 1830. National Museum of Education, Rouen.

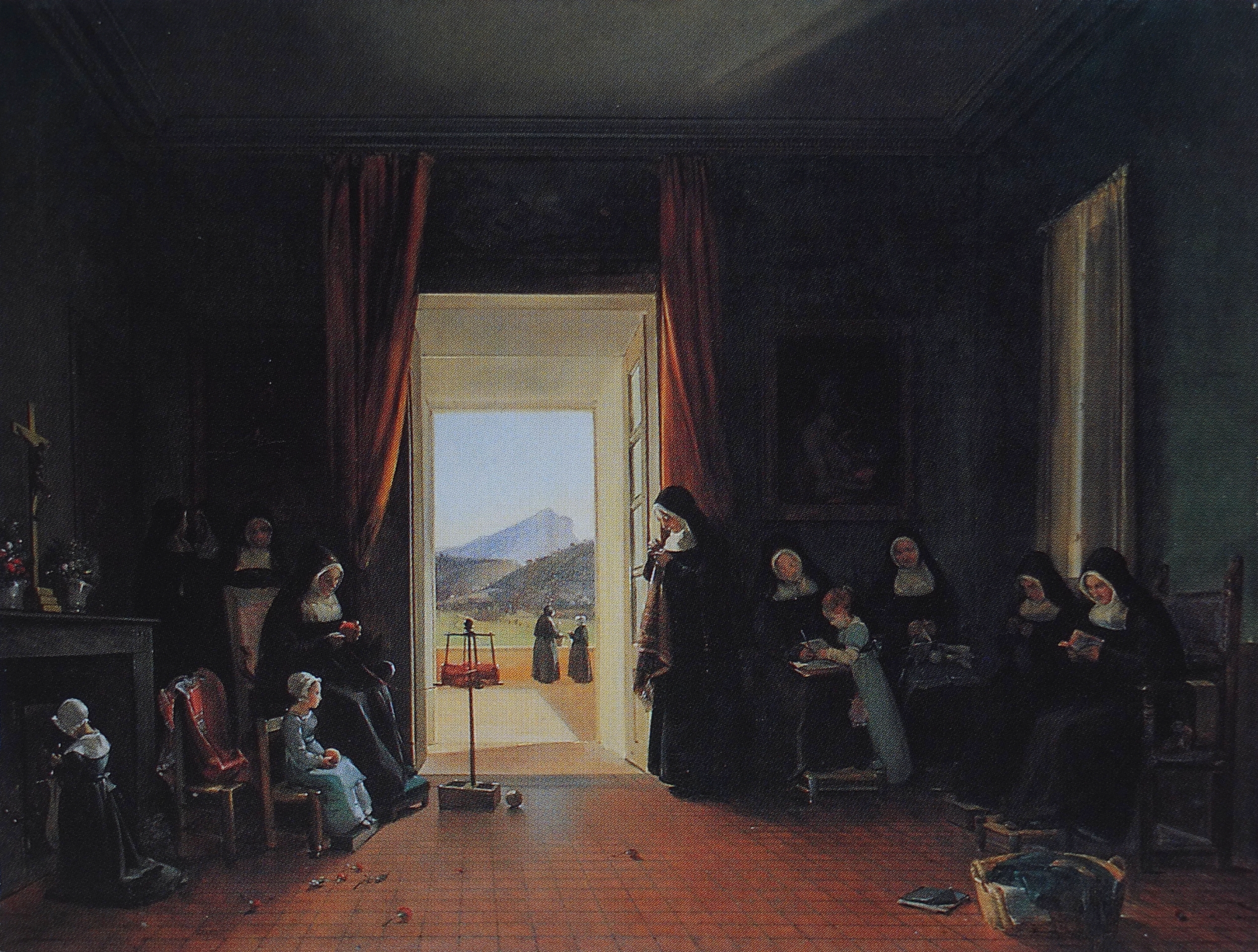
The School of the Sisters, oil on canvas by François-Marius Granet, 1833. Salon of 1833. Granet Museum, Aix-en-Provence.

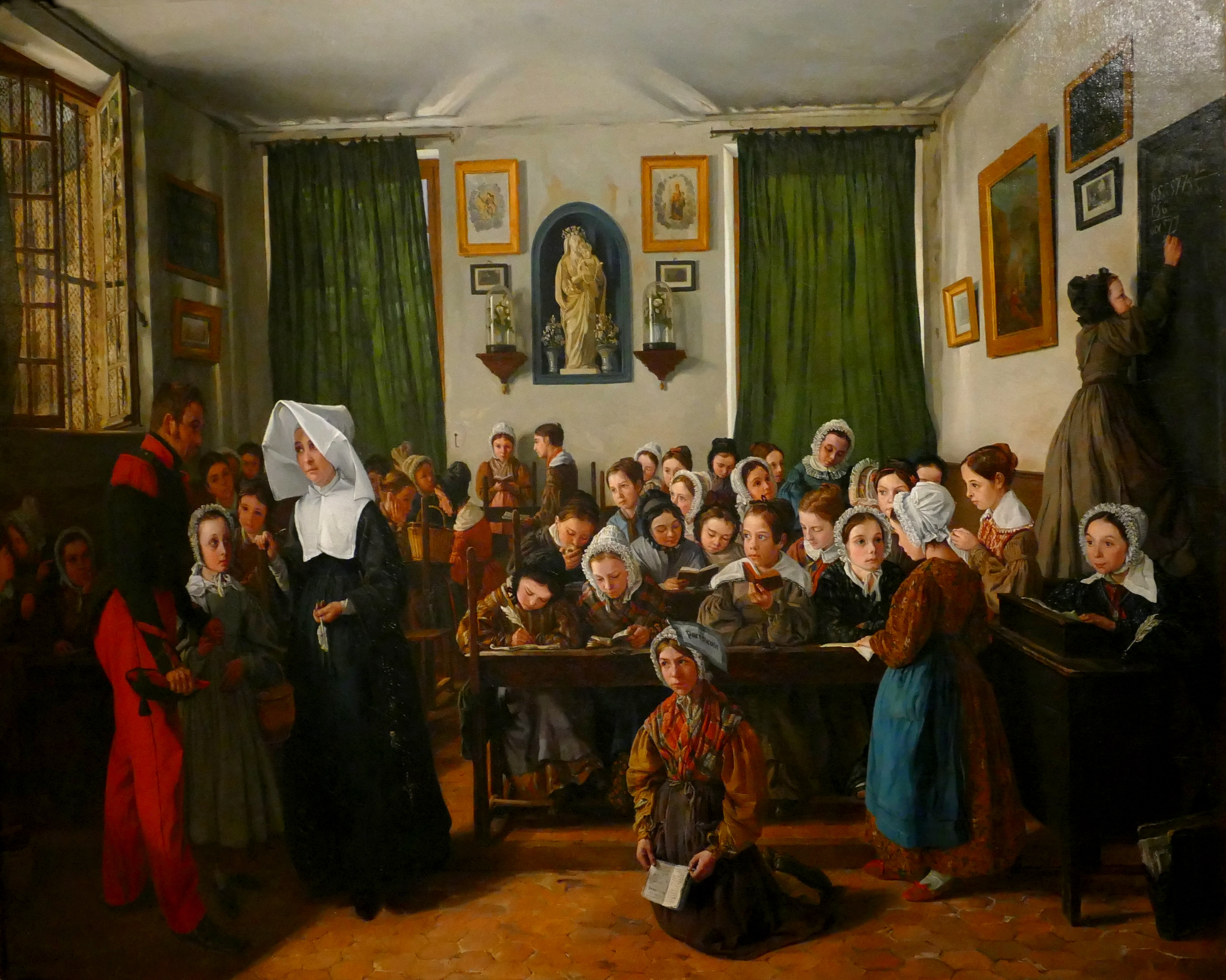
Christian School in Versailles, oil on canvas by Antoinette Asselineau, 1839. Museum of Education (Rouen).

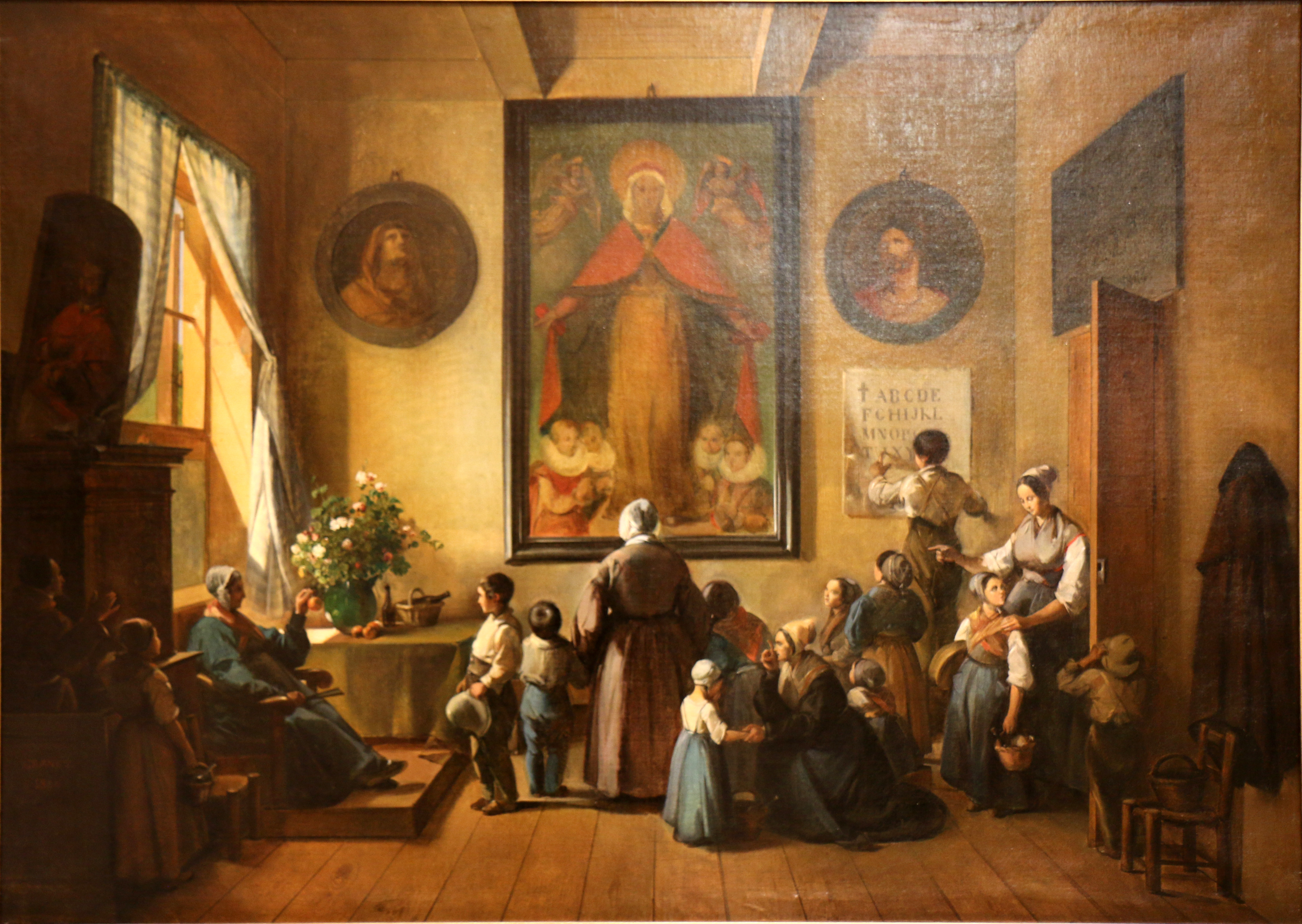
Interior of a Nursery School, canvas by François Marius Granet, 1844.

== Second Empire (1852–1870) ==
During the Second Empire, women’s education saw several developments. The Falloux Law of March 1850, enacted under the Second Republic, had established the objective of a primary school for girls in every municipality with more than 800 inhabitants. The Duruy Law of 1867 lowered this threshold to 500 inhabitants, aligning it with that for boys.

The compulsory curriculum for girls included reading, writing, basic arithmetic, moral and religious instruction, and needlework. Approximately two-thirds of girls were enrolled in school.

Education remained largely oriented toward the social roles assigned to women, including domestic work and childcare. Convents and religious congregations continued to play a central role in providing education for girls. Advocacy for the expansion of women’s education was supported by liberal opposition to the regime, including Saint-Simonian circles.

Julie-Victoire Daubié, who received a primary education and later worked as a governess, won in 1859 the first prize in a competition organized by the Academy of Lyon, endowed by François Barthélemy Arlès-Dufour. She subsequently took the baccalaureate examination, previously reserved for men, and obtained it in Lyon on 16 or 17 August 1861 at the age of 37. In 1871, she became the first woman to earn a university degree in letters at the Sorbonne.

Madeleine Brès gained admission to the faculty of medicine with the support of Empress Eugénie and the Minister of Public Instruction, Victor Duruy. These early female graduates remained exceptions: the second French woman to obtain the baccalaureate, Emma Chenu, received her diploma in 1863, two years after Daubié. The expansion of women’s education continued to be a concern for French feminists, with André Léo founding an association devoted to the issue in 1866.

The first vocational school for girls, a sewing school established by Élisa Lemonnier, opened on 1 October 1862.

The Duruy Law of 10 April 1867 reorganized the curriculum of girls’ primary education, making it national. A subsequent circular allowed for the creation of courses providing instruction beyond primary education for girls, but these initiatives were carried out by local or private institutions and remained limited, enrolling approximately two thousand students.

In 1868, Emma Chenu became the first woman in France to obtain a university degree in science.

Feminists of the period supported the education of girls. In 1862, Élisa Lemonnier founded the Society for the Vocational Education of Women and established several vocational schools for girls, offering instruction in areas such as commerce, sewing, industrial arts, and music. By 1870, five such schools existed; they charged fees and were therefore less accessible to working-class families. Additional smaller schools were established by republican women.

During the same period in Europe, debates emerged regarding coeducation, referring to the joint education of boys and girls, a model commonly practiced in the United States.

== The siege of Paris (1870–1871) ==
A few months before the declaration of the Franco-German War of 1870, Jules Ferry, then a republican deputy, declared during a lecture:

Demanding equality of education for all classes is only doing half the work, half of what is necessary, half of what is owed; this equality, I demand it, I claim it for both sexes… The difficulty, the obstacle here is not expense, it is customs.

In 1870, during the Siege of Paris, the mayors Étienne Arago and Jules Ferry convened a joint commission on education. The commission examined issues including free education and potential reforms to primary and secondary education for girls and boys. The first two women in France to obtain the baccalaureate, Julie-Victoire Daubié and Emma Chenu, participated in the commission. Its work was published in 1871 under the title Rapport présenté au nom de la commission des dames: suivi d'un appendice par Fanny Ch. Delon.

== Paris commune (1871) ==
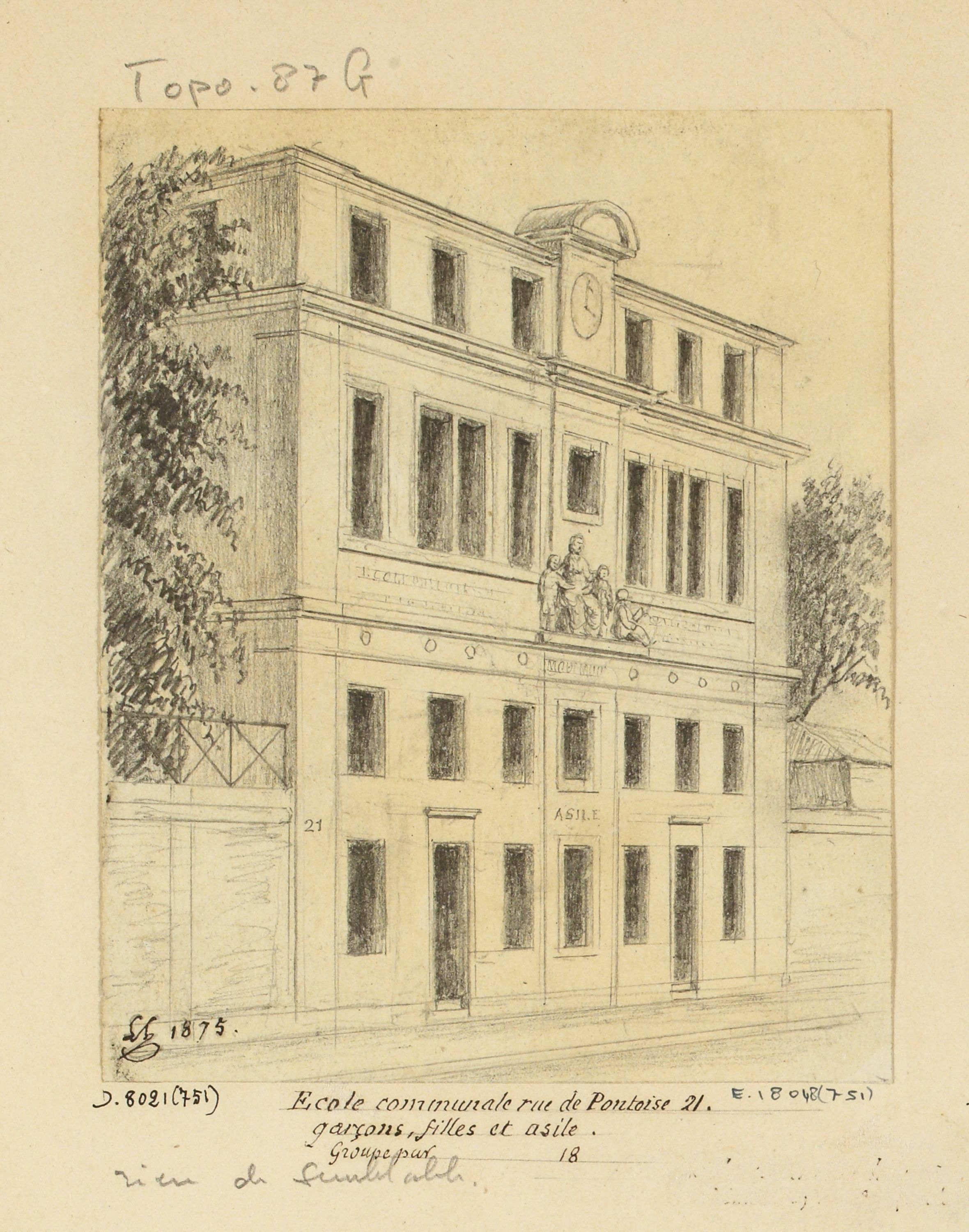
“Municipal school on Rue de Pontoise 21. Boys, girls, and nursery,” Léon Leymonnerye (1875).

At the time of the Paris Commune, most children aged seven to thirteen attended school, although educational progress was more advanced in the capital than in the provinces, where girls’ education remained largely clerical. For the Communards, the primary concern was the secularization of education: approximately two thirds of enrolled girls attended schools run by religious congregations, while the remainder attended “free” schools, which were generally secular and where teachers were not required to take an oath of obedience to the state.

Édouard Vaillant, the delegate for Public Instruction, promoted the secularization of republican female teachers through a commission that included André Léo and Anna Jaclard, with implementation varying by district. Jules Allix established a school for girls at 14 rue de la Bienfaisance. On 26 March 1871, the Society of New Education was founded, including several women, and proposed reforms to curricula and teaching methods. On 23 April, this organization, together with the Women’s Committee of the Social Commune of Paris, participated in a meeting on social welfare and education.

The Society of Friends of Education, led by Maria Verdure, aimed to create free vocational education to prepare students for working life. A “school workshop” for girls, workers, and intellectuals opened at 38 rue de Turenne, continuing initiatives begun by Élisa Lemonnier in the 1860s. On Dupuytren Street, a free drawing school for girls reopened on 12 May 1871, succeeding earlier fee-paying schools established by Lemonnier, which had previously been directed by the artist Rosa Bonheur.

== Third Republic ==
=== Primary education ===
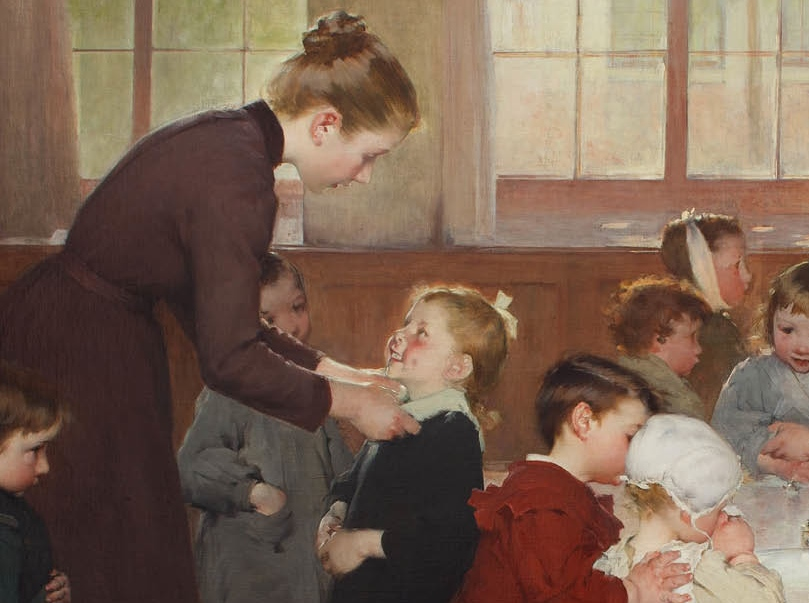
In the school, painting by Jean Geoffroy, circa 1900.

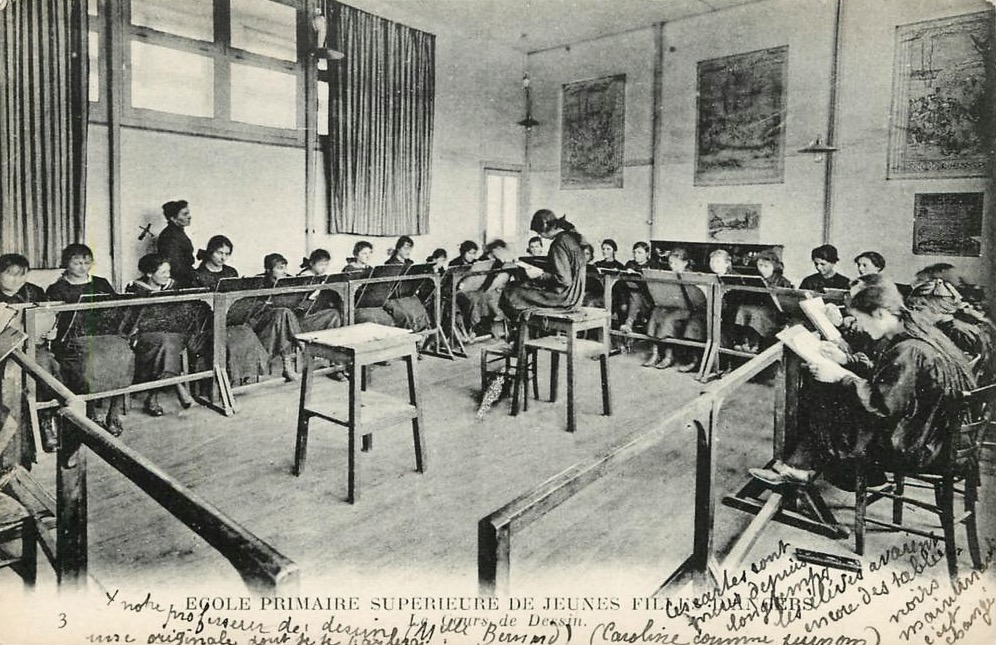
Angers Girls' High School (Maine-et-Loire), drawing class, postcard from the early 20th century.

Under the direction of the Minister of Education Jules Ferry, the school laws of 1881–1882, supplemented by the Decree of 1924, established the same primary education for girls as for boys, ensuring equal instruction. These measures introduced free elementary education, compulsory schooling for children aged six to thirteen, and secularism, without distinction between sexes. They provided all girls with instruction in reading, writing, and basic arithmetic.

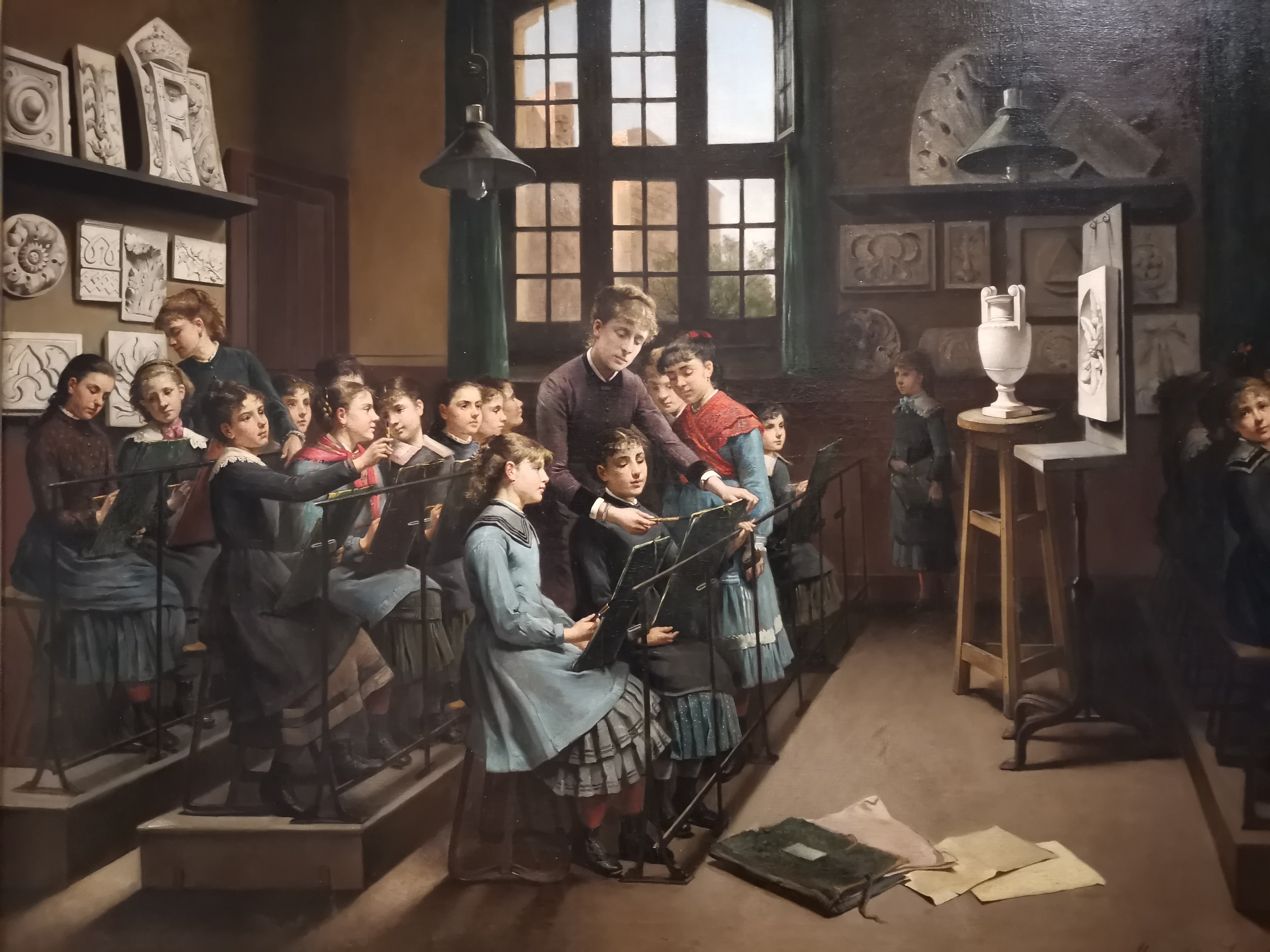
Drawing class at a municipal school for girls in Paris by Marie-Adrien Lavieille (1885).

In Paris during the 1920s, it was estimated that one third of female workers had not completed schooling up to the age of thirteen. Coeducation was generally prohibited, although the Goblet Law of 30 October 1886 allowed, for small hamlets or municipalities with fewer than 500 inhabitants, the establishment of single-class coeducational schools, subject to authorization by the Departmental Council.

Regarding teacher training, the Paul Bert Law of 9 August 1879 required each department to establish a girls’ normal school, equivalent to those for boys, to train female primary teachers.

During the 1910s, education for girls began to evolve to more closely resemble that of boys. Some primary schools, particularly in small municipalities with limited student numbers, became coeducational.

=== Secondary education ===
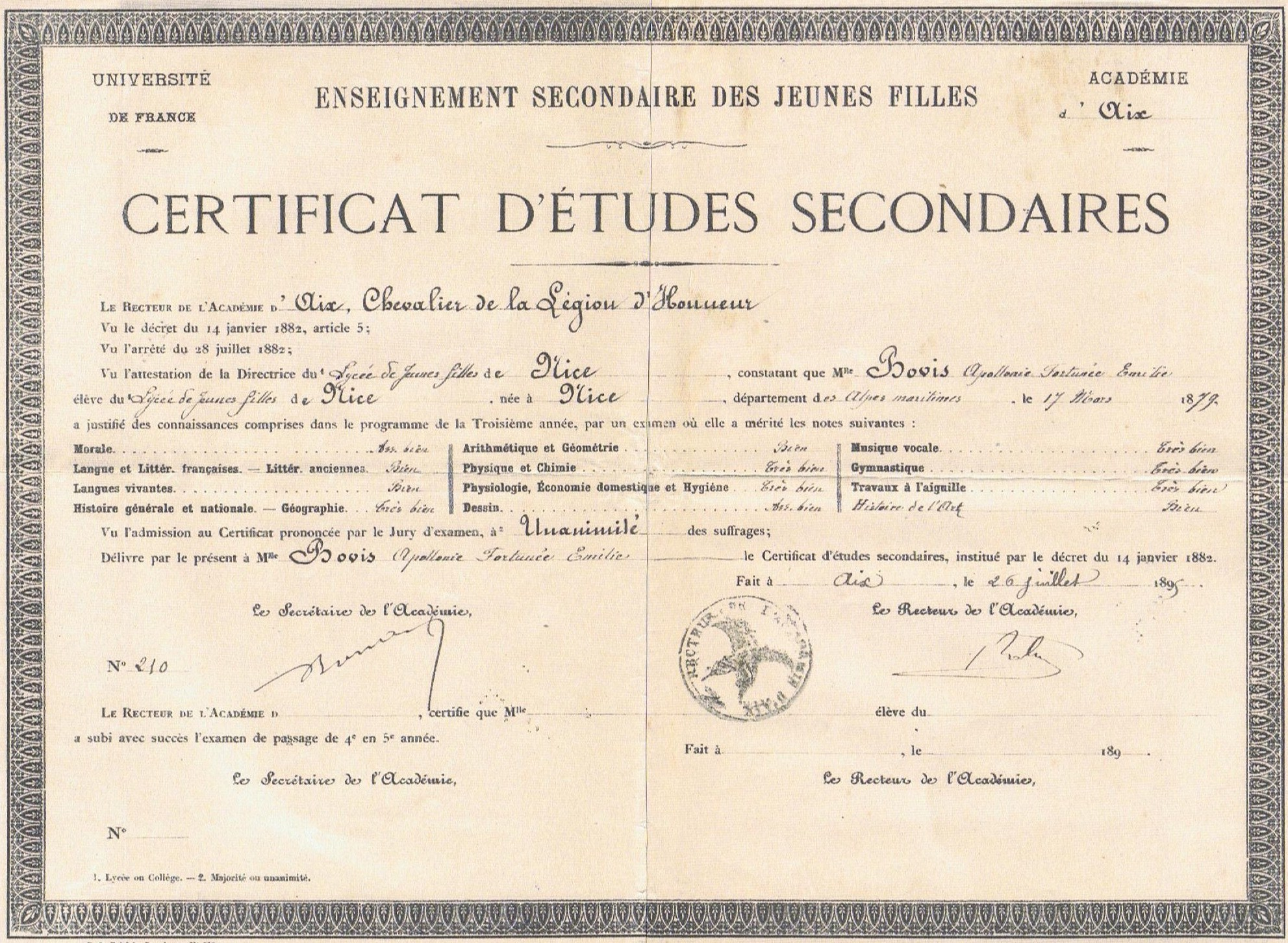
High school diploma (CES) obtained in 1895.

In 1879, Camille Sée outlined the principles of an education that would no longer be exclusively under the Church’s authority, emphasizing that women were to be prepared for roles as wives and mothers. Shortly before the reform of primary education, the Camille Sée Law of 21 December 1880 established collèges and lycées for girls, distinct from institutions attended by boys. The first institution of this type, now known as Lycée Georges-Clemenceau, opened in Montpellier in 1881 following a decree issued by Mayor Alexandre Laissac in March of that year. Jules Ferry appointed Jeanne Desparmet-Ruello as its head; she had previously directed the Higher School for Girls in Bordeaux for eight years. By 1888, twenty-three girls’ lycées had been established, increasing to thirty-six by 1893. The curricula were not aligned with those for boys and were not designed to prepare girls for the baccalaureate, which would only be accessible to them from 1924, but for a secondary studies diploma or higher certificate. Ancient Greek was not included, and Latin was offered only in selected institutions as part of an accelerated program for students aiming to take the baccalaureate. During this period, girls were most frequently educated by congregations or convents. Implementation of the law was gradual, and in some locations there were significant delays; for example, the first girls’ collège in Angers opened in 1913.

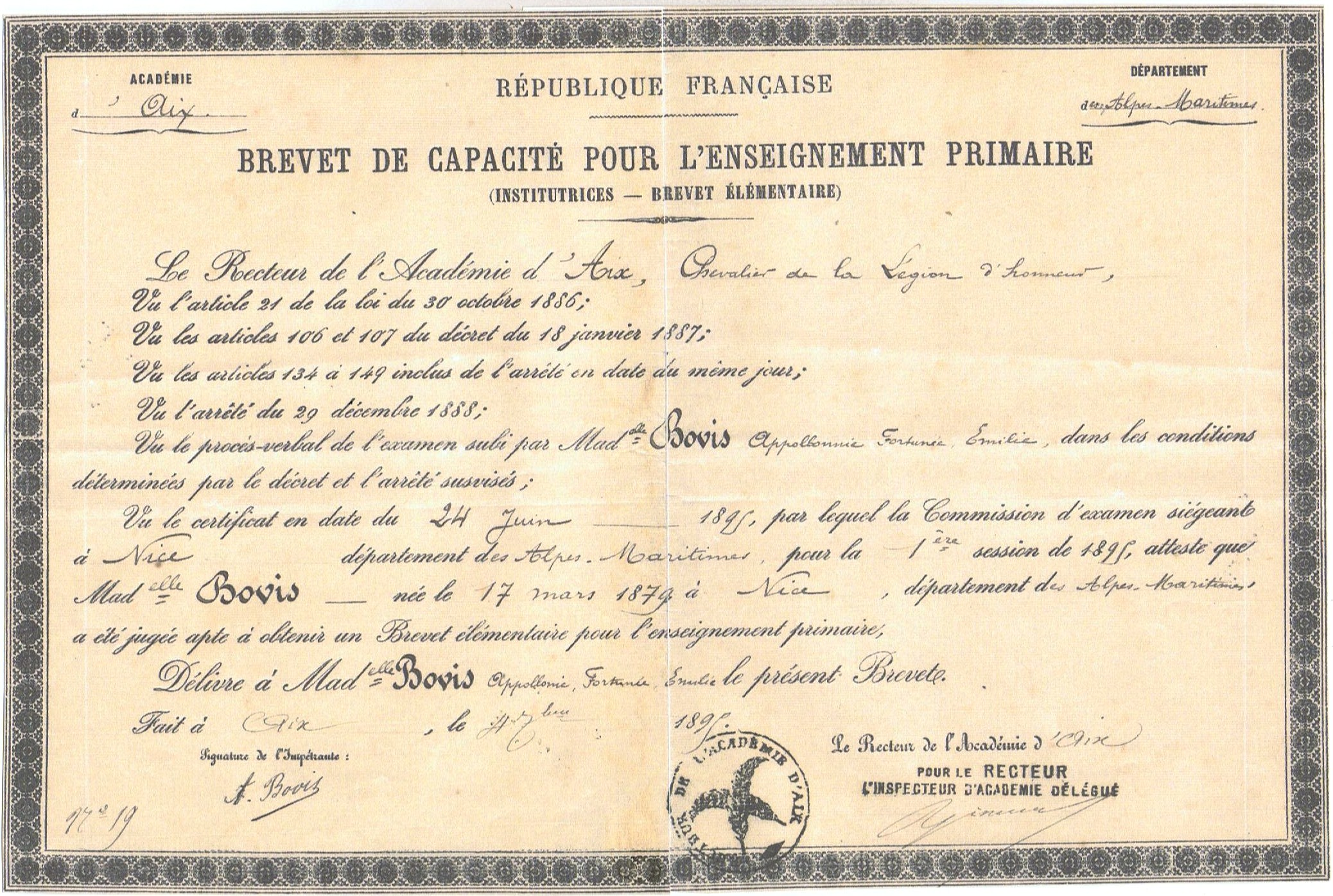
Certificate of competence for primary education (female teachers - elementary certificate) in 1895.

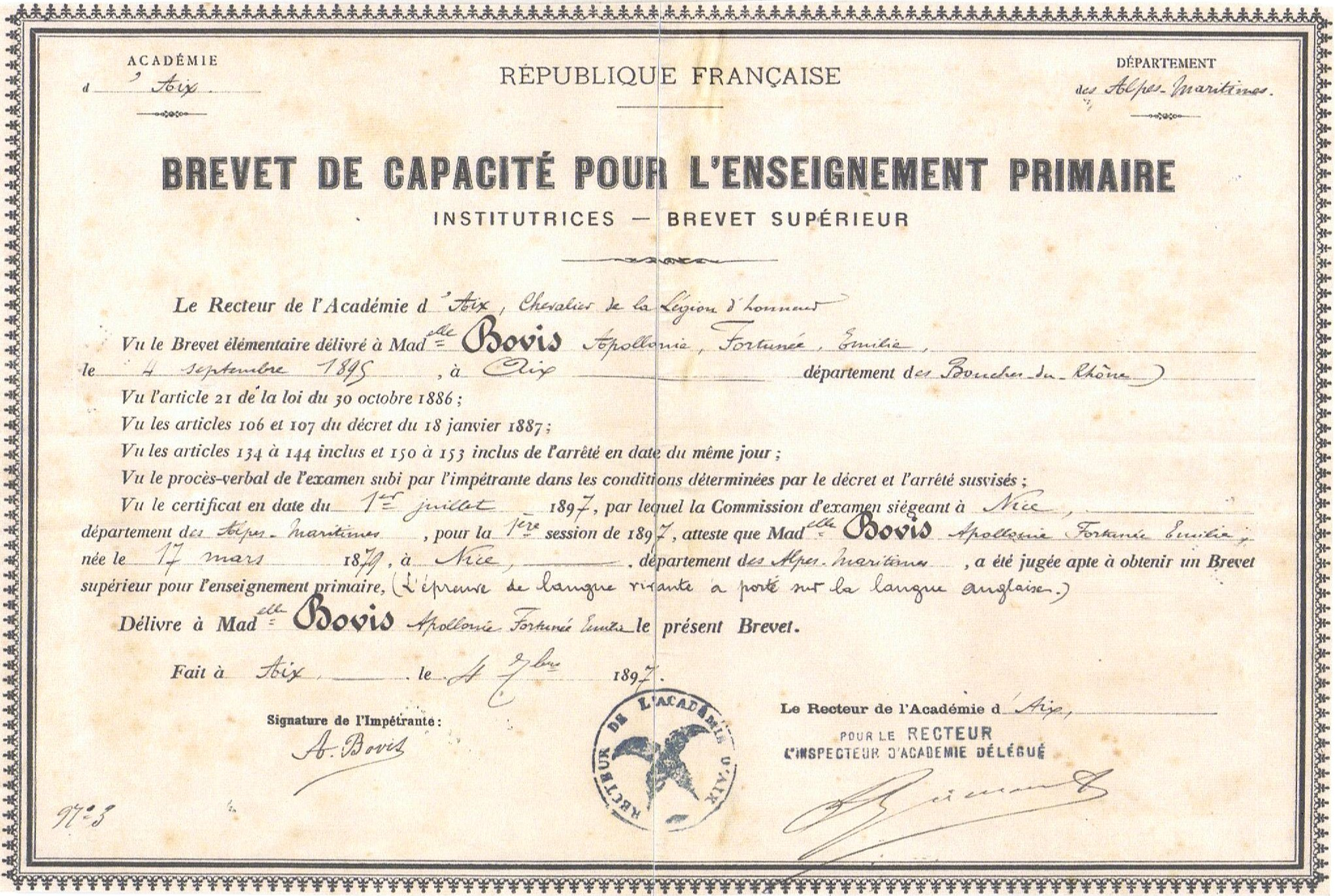
Certificate of competence for primary education (Female teachers - higher certificate) in 1897.

To train teachers for girls’ lycées, normal schools—both primary and higher—were established. Founded in 1881 and directed by Julie Favre, the École normale supérieure de jeunes filles was intended to prepare teachers for these institutions. Although it was modeled on the École normale supérieure for boys on rue d’Ulm, it was affiliated with secondary rather than higher education and had different admission requirements—higher certificate for the former and baccalaureate for the latter—as well as distinct curricula. Some female students were admitted to the agrégation, although the competitive examinations were organized separately for men and women. Certain courses, however, were taught by professors who instructed in both schools.

In 1882, Jules Ferry defined the objectives of public primary education in an annex to the curricula, which included physical education and preparation for vocational activities. According to this framework, primary schools were to incorporate bodily exercises to prepare students for future responsibilities: boys for labor and military service, and girls for domestic tasks and household work. While manual activities for boys emphasized dexterity, speed, and industrial drawing, the instruction for girls focused on skills related to managing a household and practical domestic tasks.

The book L’Enseignement secondaire des filles by the educator Octave Gréard was published in 1883.

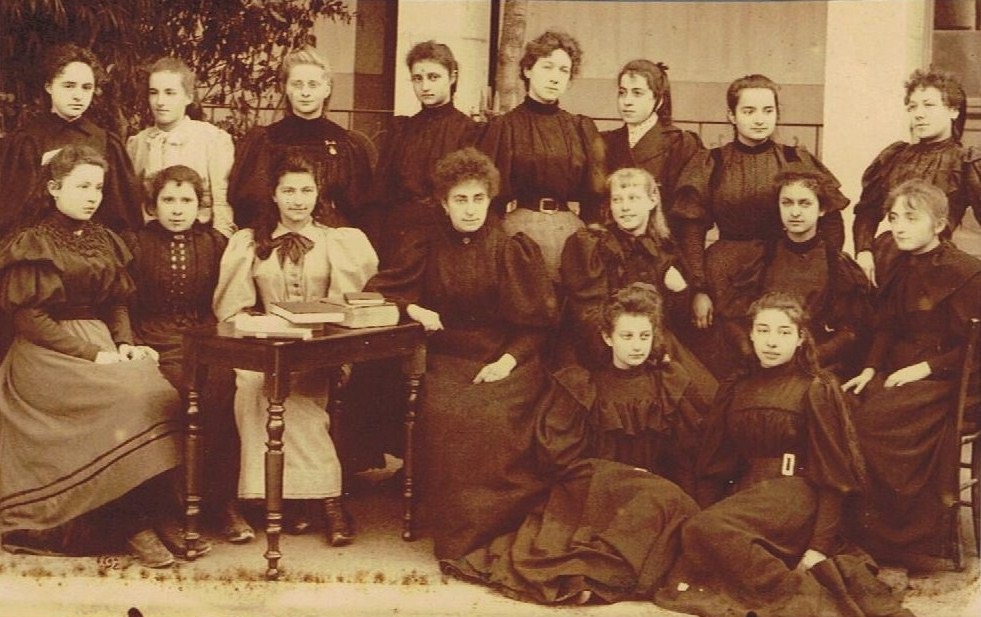
Third-year class at a girls' high school in 1894-1895.

Following the Camille Sée Law, the organization of schools and instruction differed according to the sex of the students. Curricula for girls and boys did not fully coincide: domestic economy, needlework, drawing, gymnastics, and music were compulsory for girls but not for boys, except that music was sometimes offered optionally. Girls were also taught French, a modern foreign language, history, and basic scientific concepts. While boys attended philosophy classes, girls received instruction in morality. Shortages of teachers for certain subjects were noted.

At the beginning of the twentieth century, coeducation, or mixed schooling, was a topic of debate. Ferdinand Buisson, a philosopher, educator, and politician, discussed the subject in his Nouveau dictionnaire pédagogique (1911), comparing the French system with those of Germanic and Anglo-Saxon countries. Coeducation was initially introduced in the salles d’asile, which later became nursery school classes.

By 1914, secondary education included fewer female students than male students, with girls numbering approximately half of the boys. During the First World War, the role of women in society, education, and the economy began to change. From 1922, in subjects such as mathematics or philosophy, female students could be admitted to boys’ lycée classes if their numbers were insufficient to form a separate class. In 1924, the Léon Bérard Decree aligned the secondary school curriculum for girls with that of boys.

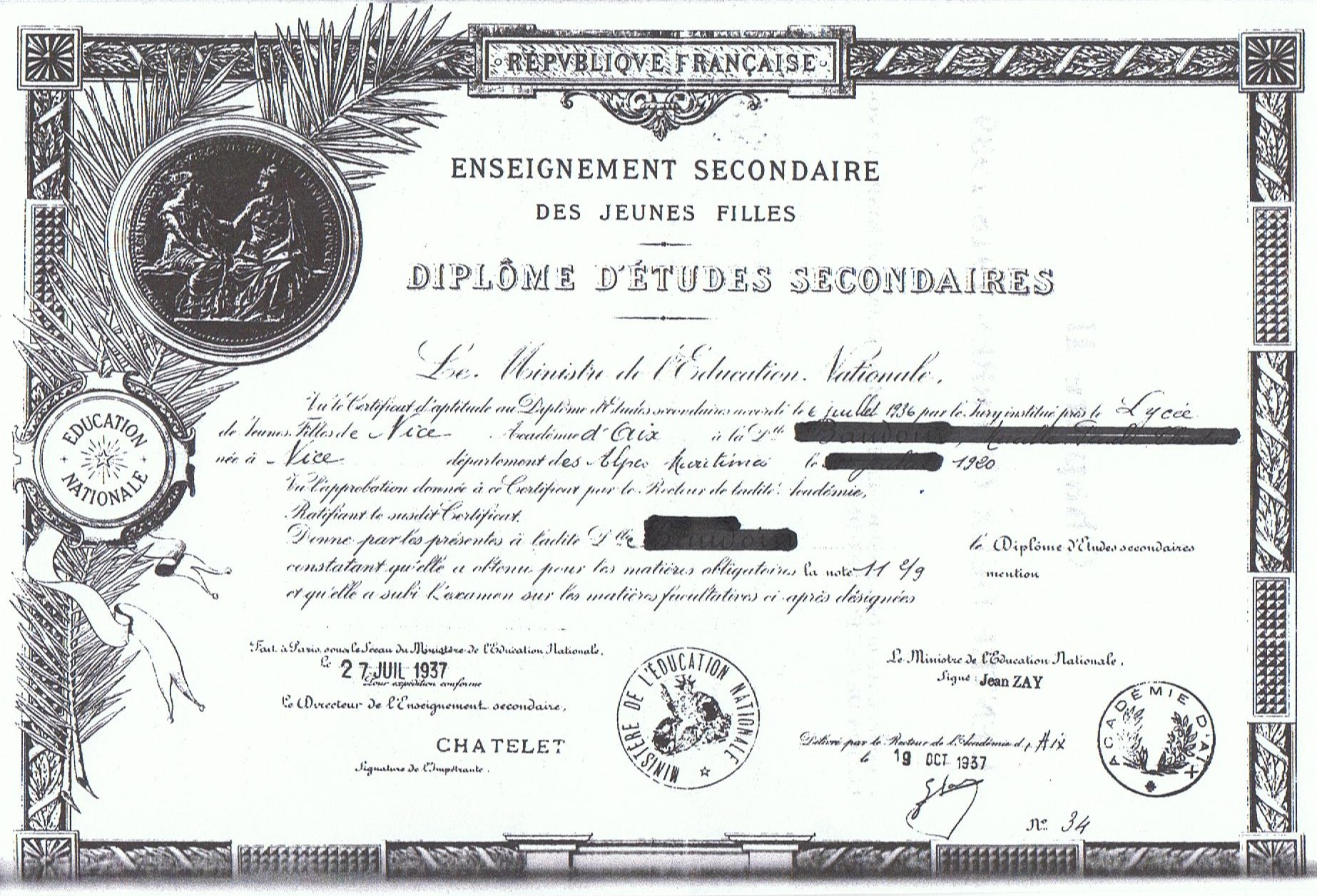
High school diploma awarded for five years of study at girls' high schools, in 1937.

At the beginning of the twentieth century, several private institutions established preparatory courses for the baccalaureate diploma, which was required for entry into higher education. The First World War increased demand for this qualification. The Léon Bérard Decree of 1924 allowed girls to take the final examination under the same conditions as boys, granting them access to university.

In 1926, boys’ secondary schools with fewer than 150 pupils were authorized to admit girls.

By 1930, although most classes remained single-sex, girls and boys followed the same curricula, schedules, and were eligible for the same diplomas. Girls’ secondary education, however, continued to operate within a complex regulatory framework.

=== University education ===
Access to university for girls and women was generally limited, as it required a diploma covering subjects taught primarily in male secondary schools, such as Latin. Until 1938, women seeking to enroll at university also required the authorization of their husband.

The first woman admitted to a French university was Julie-Victoire Daubié in 1861. Access for women expanded from 1880 onward, and by 1914, women represented approximately 10 percent of university students in France. Universities with higher proportions of female students before 1914 included Paris, Montpellier, Nancy, and Grenoble. Prior to the First World War, France ranked second globally in the number of female university students, after Switzerland, where coeducational higher education had been established in 1867 and women accounted for nearly 25 percent of enrollments at the beginning of the twentieth century.

=== Vocational training ===
From the 1910s onward, an increasing number of training programs, diplomas, and professions became accessible to women. These opportunities were often in occupations traditionally associated with women, including nursing, secretarial work, and teaching. This gendered division of labor continued for several decades.

== From 1945 to the end of the 20th century ==
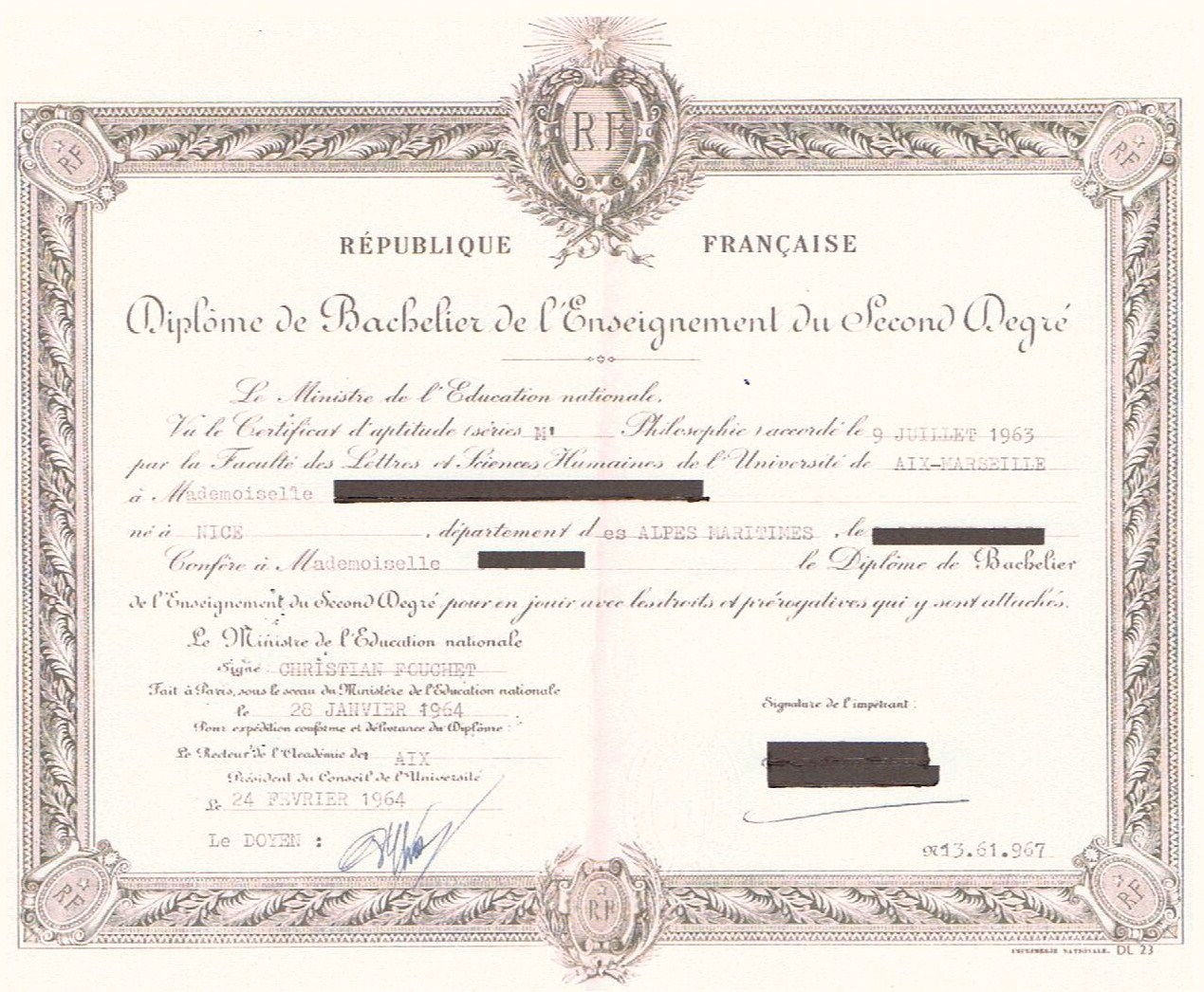
High school diploma awarded to a young girl in 1964.

The 1963 Capelle–Fouchet decree established coeducation in lower secondary schools from their inception.

Following the social movements of 1968, coeducation expanded in secondary schools, primarily for logistical rather than pedagogical reasons, often reflecting coexistence rather than fully integrated instruction. During the 1970s, public girls’ lycées were gradually transformed into coeducational institutions, later referred to as lycées and eventually as regional lycées, typically offering general, technological, and vocational tracks.

In 1969, coeducation was extended to primary schools.

In public institutions, including the grandes écoles, the Haby Law of 11 July 1975 made coeducation compulsory. This measure was widely accepted within the French education system, which emphasizes a republican and universalist approach that tends to minimize distinctions based on social, cultural, or gender affiliation. Coeducation and gender equality in education were reaffirmed in the 1989 education framework law.

Regarding gender inequalities in education, research in England developed earlier than in France, beginning in the 1970s, whereas similar studies emerged in France during the 1990s. Initially focused on girls, research has increasingly included boys and has examined the role of schools in the reproduction of social relations and gender norms.

Over time, the French Ministry of Education has implemented initiatives that extend beyond coeducation, aiming to promote genuine equality between girls and boys, and between women and men.

== At the beginning of the 21st century ==
Despite efforts to reduce inequalities and discrimination between girls and boys in education and society, such disparities persist in the early 21st century, although they are less visible. For example, studies indicate that girls often report lower professional ambitions than boys. School textbooks also tend to feature fewer notable women compared with men and may reflect certain gender stereotypes, despite initiatives by the United Nations and France since the 1970s and 1980s to address discrimination.

Research from the early 21st century generally shows differences in educational trajectories and achievement according to students’ sex, although multiple other factors also influence outcomes.

Coeducation does not apply to the educational institutions of the Legion of Honour, which are public boarding schools for girls, nor to private single-sex boarding schools, which enrolled approximately 10,000 students in 2008.

== See also ==
- Education in France
- École Normale Primaire
- Mixed-sex education
- Secularism
- Women's history
- Noblewoman
- Education in France#Primary school

== Bibliography ==
- André-Durupt, Véronique (2011). Julie-Victoire Daubié : la première bachelière [Julie-Victoire Daubié: the first woman to obtain a high school diploma] (in French). Les Amis du Vieux Fontenoy.
- Baudelot, Christian; Establet, Roger (2006). Allez les filles ! [Come on, girls!] (in French). Éditions du Seuil.
- Clark, Linda (1984). Schooling the daughters of Marianne : textbooks and the socialisation of girls in modern French primary schools. State university of New York press.
- Duru-Bellat, Marie (2004). "École de garçons et école de filles…" [Boys' school and girls' school...]. Diversité (in French). 138: 65–72. doi:10.3406/diver.2004.2305.
- Gemie, Sharif (1995). Women and schooling in France, 1815-1914 : gender, authority and identity in the female schooling sector. Keele university press.
- Lelièvre, Françoise; Lelièvre, Claude (1991). Histoire de la scolarisation des filles [History of girls' education] (in French). Nathan.
- Alvarès, Théodore Lévi (1909). D. Lévi Alvarès, sa vie - sa méthode - son enseignement [D. Lévi Alvarès, his life - his method - his teaching] (in French). Paris: Librairie Léopold Cerf.
- Lévy, Marie-Françoise (1984). De mères en filles : l'éducation des Françaises : 1850-1880 [From mothers to daughters: the education of French women: 1850-1880] (in French). Calmann-Lévy.
- Mathieu, Nicolas (2021). Les femmes en Gaule romaine [Women in Roman Gaul] (in French). Errances. ISBN 978-2877727273.
- Matrat, Marie (1889). Les écoles maternelles et le décret du 2 août 1881 [Preschools and the decree of August 2, 1881] (in French). Paris: Librairie Ch. Delagrave.
- Mayeur, Françoise (1977). L'enseignement secondaire des jeunes filles sous la Troisième République [Secondary education for girls under the Third Republic] (in French). Presses de la Fondation nationale des sciences politiques.
- Mayeur, Françoise (2008). L'éducation des filles en France au XIXe siècle [Girls' education in France in the 19th century] (in French). Perrin.
- Mayeur, Françoise (1988). Problèmes de l'histoire de l'éducation. Actes des séminaires organisés par l'Ecole française de Rome et l'Università di Roma - La Sapienza (janvier-mai 1985) : L'éducation des filles en France au XIXe siècle : historiographie problématique Rome, école française de Rome [Problems in the history of education. Proceedings of seminars organized by the French School in Rome and the Università di Roma - La Sapienza (January-May 1985): The education of girls in France in the 19th century: problematic historiography Rome, French School in Rome] (in French). Publications de l’École française de Rome.
- Mayeur, Françoise (1981). Histoire de l'enseignement et de l'éducation [History of teaching and education] (in French). Vol. III. Paris: Perrin.
- Unknown (1911). "Filles (Instruction primaire, secondaire et supérieure des)" [Girls (Primary, secondary, and higher education for)]. Nouveau dictionnaire de pédagogie et d'instruction primaire [New Dictionary of Pedagogy and Primary Education] (in French).
- Rogers, Rebecca (2007). Les bourgeoises au pensionnat : l'éducation féminine au XIXe siècle [Bourgeois girls at boarding school: female education in the 19th century] (in French). Presses universitaires de Rennes.
- Rogers, Rebecca; Thébaud, Françoise (2010). La fabrique des filles : l'éducation des filles de Jules Ferry à la pilule [The Making of Girls: Girls' Education from Jules Ferry to the Pill] (in French). Textuel.
- Sonnet, Martine (1987). L'Éducation des filles au temps des Lumières [Girls' Education in the Age of Enlightenment] (in French). Éditions du Cerf.
- Verneuil, Yves (2009). L'enseignement secondaire féminin et l'identité féminine enseignante : hommage à Françoise Mayeur : actes de la journée d'études organisée le 8 juin 2007 au centre IUFM de Troyes / IUFM de Champagne-Ardenne [Secondary education for girls and female teacher identity: tribute to Françoise Mayeur: proceedings of the study day held on June 8, 2007, at the IUFM center in Troyes / IUFM in Champagne-Ardenne] (in French). Reims: CRDP de Champagne-Ardenne.
- Hulin, Nicole (2002). Les femmes et l'enseignement scientifique [Women and science education] (in French). Paris: PUF.
- Buisson, Ferdinand (1836). Manuel général de l'instruction primaire [General Manual for Primary Education] (in French). Paris: Firmin Didot Frères & L. Hachette.
