= Marie Lavieille =

Marie Lavieille may refer to:

- Marie Adrien Lavieille (1852–1911), French painter
- Marie Ernestine Lavieille (1852–1937), French painter
