= Pontus and Sidonia =

1400 book by Geoffroy IV de la Tour Landry

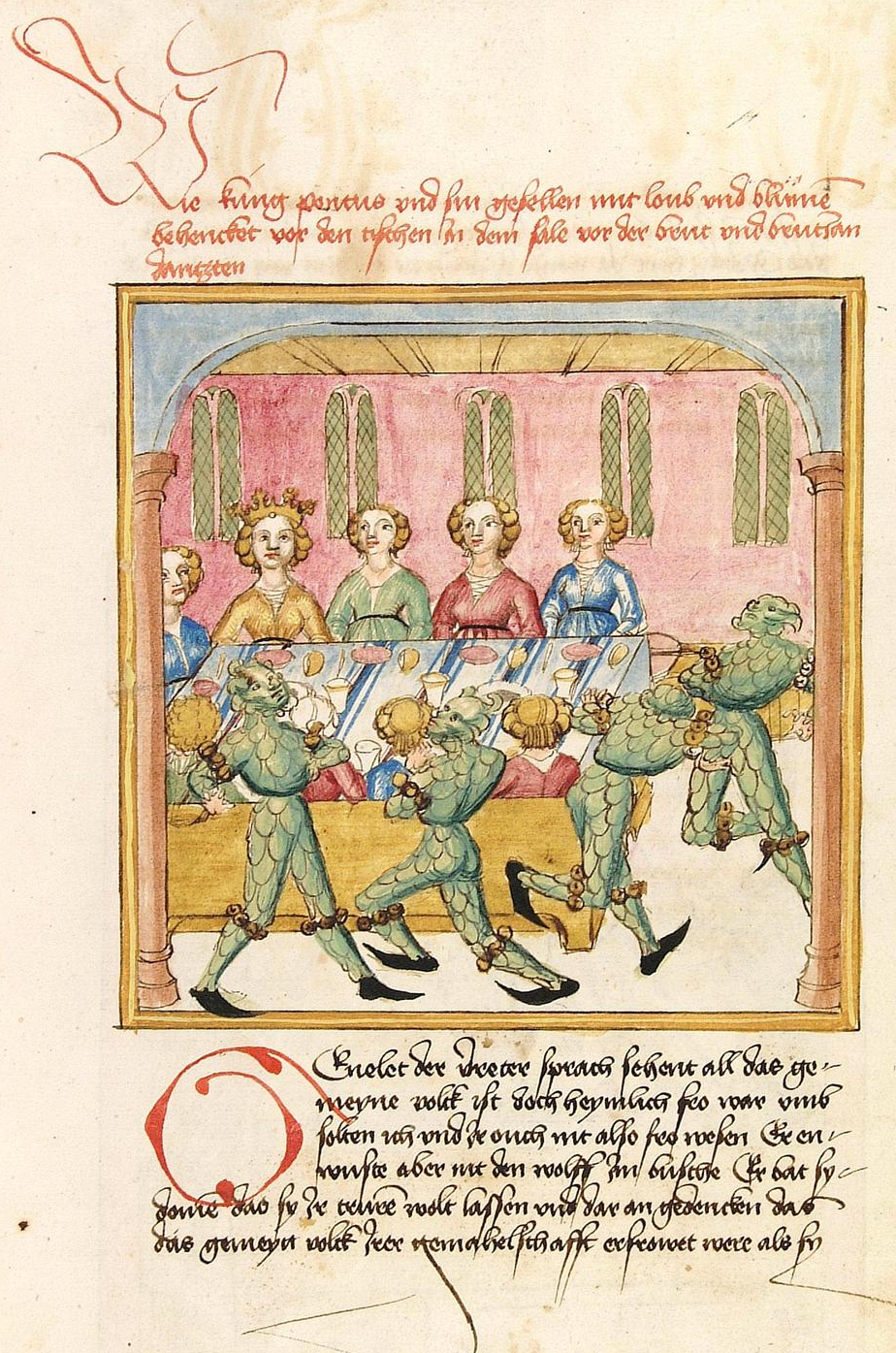
Pontus and his train disguised as wild men at the wedding of Sidonia and Genelet, illustration in a manuscript commissioned for Margarethe of Savoy in ca. 1475 (Heidelberg, CPG 142, fol. 122r).

Pontus and Sidonia (French: Ponthus et la belle Sidonie or just Ponthus et Sidoine) is a medieval prose romance, originally composed in French in ca. 1400, possibly by Geoffroy IV de la Tour Landry (d. 1391) or by another member of the La Tour family. It is about Pontus, the son of the king of Galicia, who falls in love with Sidonia, daughter of the king of Brittany. The text is associated with the lords of La Tour because it derives the ancestors of that family, whose ancestral possessions were in Brittany, from members of the train of prince Pontus. The story is based on an earlier work, the Anglo-Norman chanson de geste Horn et Rimenhild (ca. 1180).

Several German translations were made during the 15th century (viz., in the period corresponding to the final phase of Middle High German or the formative phase of Early New High German). There is a surviving version in Alemannic German, possibly written in the Old Swiss Confederacy, dated to between 1440 and 1460, and another version in Moselle Franconian, probably written in the region of Trier. Another translation of the French text was made by Eleanor, Archduchess of Austria (1433–1480).

Two English translations appeared within a century: an anonymous one in 1450, and one by Henry Watson in 1501 and 1511.

A late medieval Dutch translation Die historie van Ponthus ende die schoone Sidonie survived in an edition printed by Niclaes vanden Wouwere in Antwerp in 1564.
