= Charles Georges Ferville-Suan =

French sculptor

Charles Georges Ferville-Suan was a French sculptor.

== Biography ==
He was born in Le Mans, in Sarthe, on 16 January 1847, and was adopted by the painter Charles Suan. He lived much of his life in Montmartre, and died in Le Mans on 11 December 1925.

He studied at the École des Beaux-Arts of Paris, and was a pupil of François Jouffroy.

He realized medaillons and statuettes, in plaster, marble or bronze. He exhibited at the Salon, as early as 1872, and until 1909, and became a member of the Société des Artistes Français.

In 1878, he married Marie Ernestine Lavieille, daughter of Eugène Lavieille, and landscape painter as her father.

== Works ==
- L'amour captif, plaster statue. Collections of Le Mans Museums.
- Le peintre Jaffard, terra-cotta medaillon. Collections of Le Mans Museums.

== Bibliography ==
- Émile Bellier de la Chavignerie and Louis Auvray. Dictionnaire général des artistes de l'École française depuis l'origine des arts du dessin jusqu'à nos jours. Renouard, Paris, 1882–1887. Reprint : Garland Publishing Inc., New York & London, 1979.
- E. Bénézit. Dictionnaire des peintres, sculpteurs, dessinateurs et graveurs, 1999, Gründ.
- André Roussard. Dictionnaire des peintres à Montmartre. Peintres, sculpteurs, graveurs, dessinateurs, illustrateurs, plasticiens aux XIXe et XXe siècles. Éditions André Roussard, 1999.
