= Geoffroy IV de la Tour Landry =

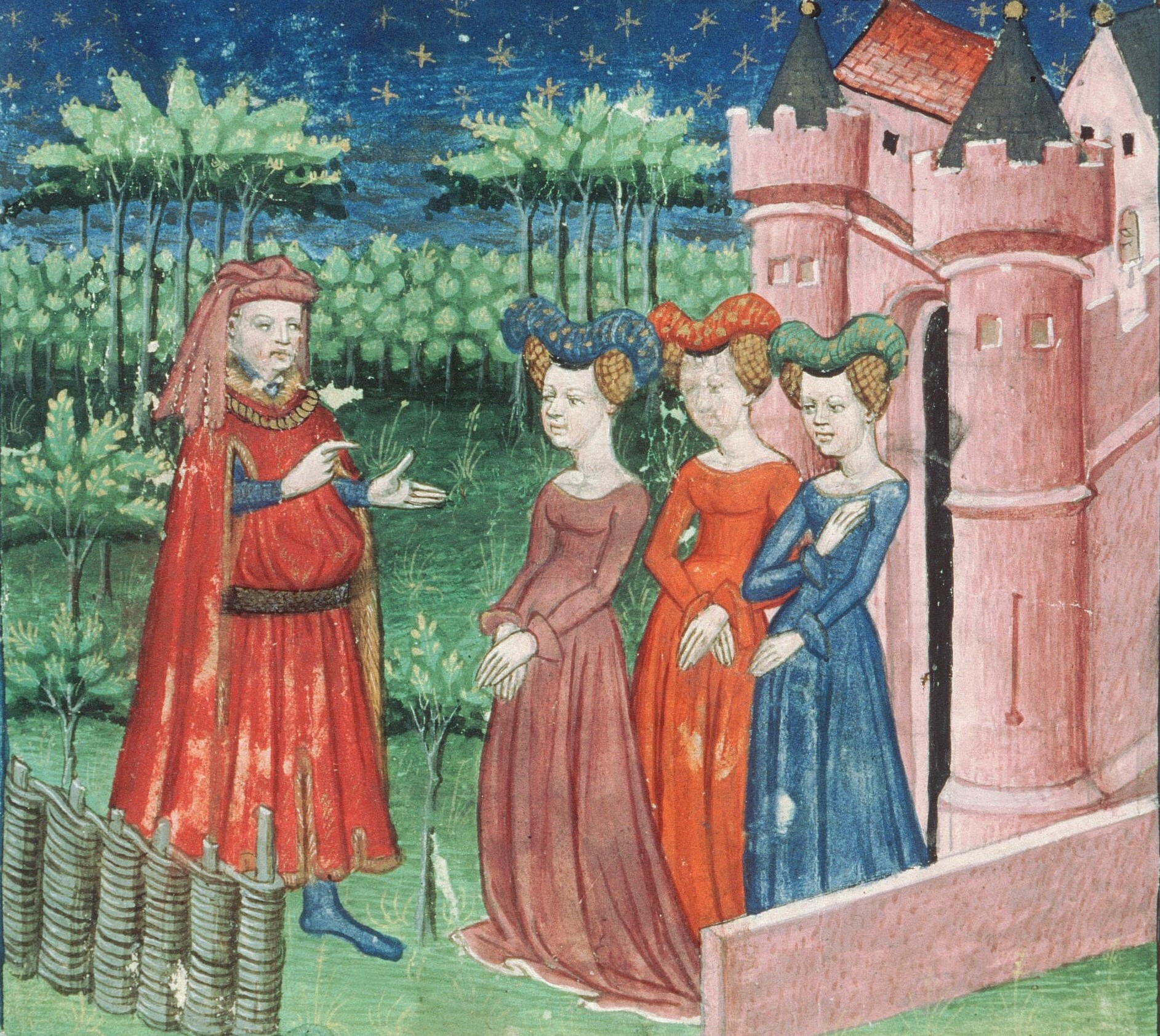
Geoffroy de la Tour Landry teaching to his daughters, miniature from a medieval manuscript of the Livre pour l'enseignement de ses filles

Geoffroy IV de la Tour Landry (before 1330-between 1402 and 1406) was a nobleman of Anjou who fought in the Hundred Years War.

In 1371–1372 Geoffroy compiled the Livre pour l'enseignement de ses filles ("The Book of the Knight in the Tower") for the instruction of his daughters—La Tour Landry stands (a ruin today) between Cholet and Vezins.

== Biography ==
Geoffroy fought in the Hundred Years War; he was at the siege of Aguillon in 1346 and was in the war as late as 1383. His name again appears in a military muster in 1363. He married Jeanne de Rougé, younger daughter of Bonabes de Rougé, sieur of Derval, vicomte de La Guerche, and chamberlain to the king. In 1378, as a "knight banneret", he sent a contingent of men to join the siege of Cherbourg, but he did not serve in person. In 1380 Geoffroy was fighting in Brittany, and was last mentioned in 1383. He made a second marriage with Marguerite des Roches, dame de La Mothe de Pendu, the widow of Jean de Clerembault, knight.

== Work ==
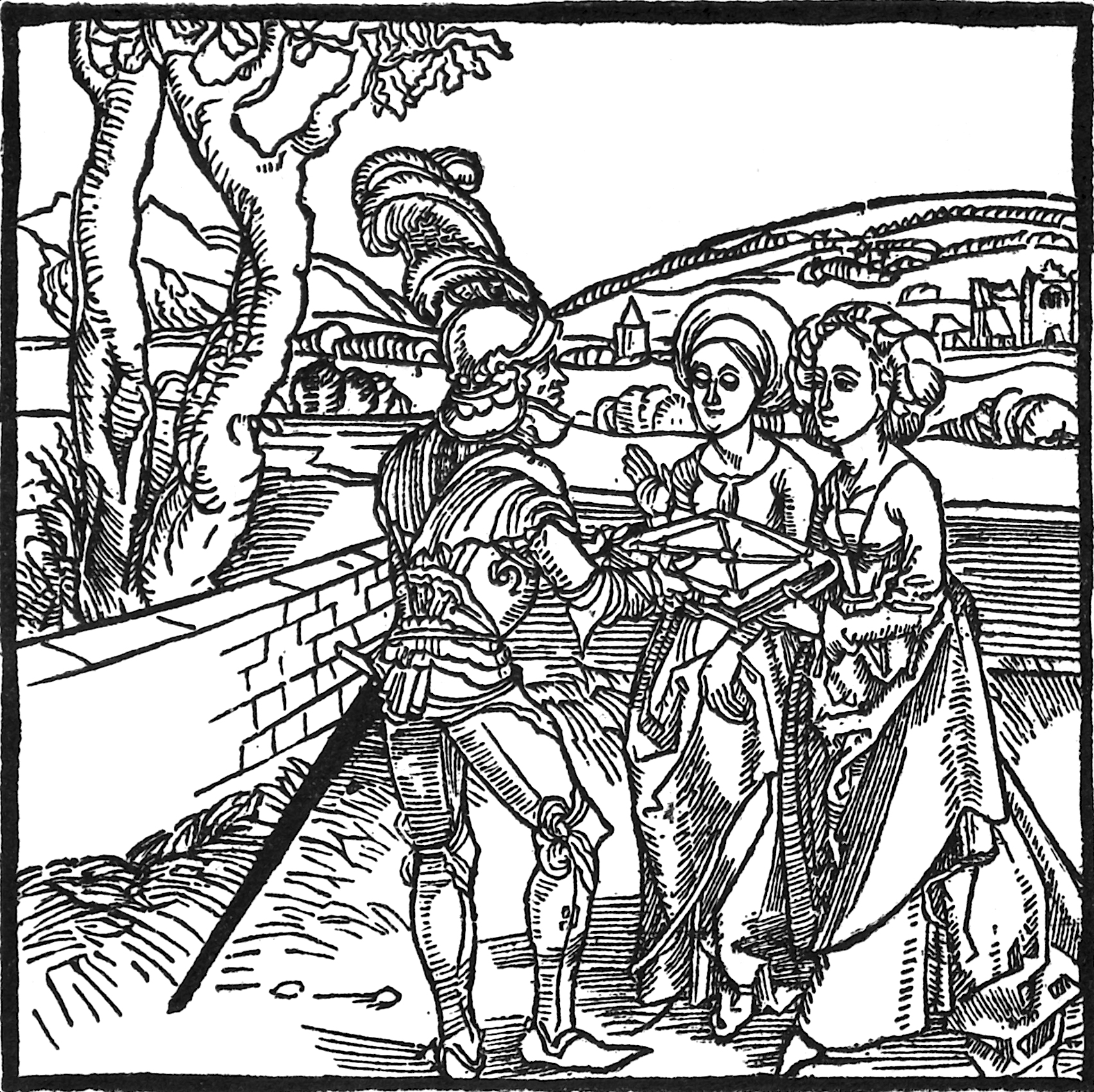
"Geoffroy de la Tour Landry offering his book to his daughter", woodcut of Albrecht Dürer, from the German adaptation, Der Ritter vom Turn, Basel, Michael Furter, 1493

Geoffrey compiled the Livre pour l'enseignement de ses filles for the instruction of his daughters, in 1371–1372. A similar book he had previously written for his sons, according to his opening text, has disappeared. The work became the most popular educational treatise of the Late Middle Ages. It was translated into German, as Der Ritter vom Turn, and at least twice into English, once by William Caxton, who printed it as The Book of the Knight of the Tower in 1483. (Note: It was reprinted by T. Wright for the Early English Text Society in 1868, from a manuscript made in the reign of Henry VI (London, British Library Harley MS 1764).) A Dutch adaptation, titled Dē spiegel der duecht, appeared in 1515 by the Brussels printer Thomas van der Noot.

The Livre pour l'enseignement de ses filles served as a tutorial for De la Tour Landry's daughters on proper behaviour when visiting the royal court, which, the knight warns, is filled with smooth-talking courtiers who could potentially disgrace them and embarrass the family. The author was a widower, and concerned for his daughters' welfare. He takes a strong moral stance against the behaviour of his peers and warns his daughters about the dangers of vanity.

== Family ==
Landricus Dunesis is the name of the first known member of the De La Tour Landry family; his name appears in a charter dated from c. 1061. He built a tower and fortress that were destroyed at the end of the eleventh century. The site of the subsequently rebuilt castle still stands in the canton of Chemillé, Maine-et-Loire. De la Tour Landry's grandfather, Geoffroy III de la Tour Landry, had married Olive de Belleville, the daughter of a neighboring grand seigneur. She is mentioned in the Livre as enjoying the company of minstrels, and lauded for her generosity and piety.

In the fifteenth century, Pontus de la Tour Landry commissioned the romance of Pontus et la belle Sidonie, glamorizing the family's origins in the train of Pontus, the son of the king of Galicia who fell in love with the fair Sidonia, daughter of the king of Brittany, where part of the ancestral possessions of the lords of La Tour lay.

== Cultural references ==
In the novel The Once and Future King, by T.H. White, a reference is made that states "before King Arthur had made his chivalry, the Knight of the Tower Landry had been compelled to warn his daughter against entering her own dining hall in the evening unaccompanied – for fear of what might happen in the dark corners".

In the novel Timeline, by Michael Crichton, a reference is made which states

As the Professor left, Marek said, "I pray God look with favor upon your journey and deliver you safe back." That was what he always said to departing friends. It had been a favorite phrase of the Count Geoffrey de la Tour, six hundred years before."
