= Adrien Lavieille =

French painter

Not to be confused with the wood-engraver Adrien Lavieille (wood-engraver) (1818–1862).

Adrien Lavieille (March 29, 1848, Montmartre – February 5, 1920, Chartres) was a French painter.

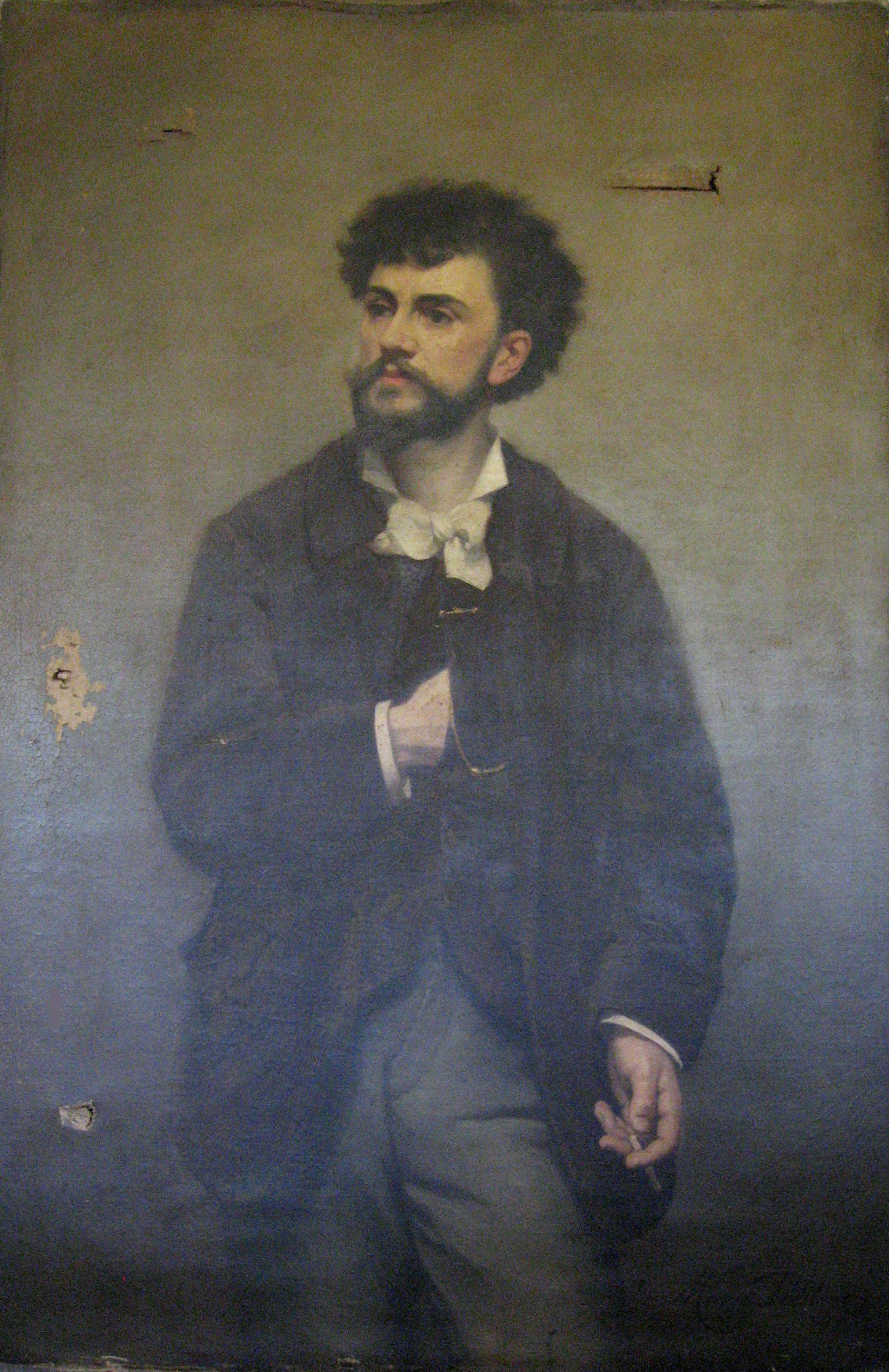
Portrait of Adrien Lavieille in 1879, by his wife, Marie Adrien Lavieille. Oil on canvas (private collection).

Son of the landscape painter Eugène Lavieille, and nephew of the wood-engraver Jacques Adrien Lavieille (1818–1862), he was a painter of the country : near Paris, in Brittany, near Cancale and on the riverside of the Vilaine in the south of Rennes, in Touraine, at Saint-Jean-de-Monts in Vendée, where he was invited by a friend, the painter and engraver Auguste Lepère, around Vendôme where he sojourned in the home of his daughter, Andrée Lavieille, so a painter, and of his son-in-law, the man of letters, Paul Tuffrau.

He also painted in Montmartre, where he lived during his youthful days, and, as his father, at Moret-sur-Loing, near Fontainebleau.

Parallelly to his painter's activities, Adrien Lavieille executed, during his life, for money's reasons, works of restoration and decoration : basilica Saint-Martin in Tours (where he worked with the painter Pierre Fritel), Palais de Justice of Rennes, Château de Vaux-le-Vicomte, Hôtel de Lauzun, quai d'Anjou in Paris.

In 1878, he married the painter Marie Petit, who henceforth signed Marie Adrien Lavieille.

== Bibliography ==
- Françoise Cambon, Henri Cambon. Adrien Lavieille (1848–1920), peintre de la campagne. Atlantica, 2008.
