= Andrée Lavieille =

French painter

- Born: 11 September 1887; Paris, France
- Died: 14 May 1960 (aged 72); Paris, France
- Known for: Painting

Andrée Lavieille (Paris 11 September 1887 – 14 May 1960 Paris) was a French painter.

Daughter and granddaughter of painters (her father, Adrien Lavieille, and her mother, Marie Adrien Lavieille, her grandfather on the father's side, Eugène Lavieille), Andrée Lavieille entered École des Beaux-Arts in 1908. Subjects of her paintings were still lifes, interiors and especially landscapes. She painted at Saint-Jean-de-Monts in Vendée beside Auguste Lepère, at Fontainebleau, Vendôme, Chartres, then in Paris, where she and her husband, Paul Tuffrau, a man of letters, have successively inhabited, in Gironde in the little village of Plassac, and above all in Brittany, which immediately won her heart, particularly at Le Pouldu (1924–1939), and in the region of the Pointe du Raz and the baie des Trépassés (1937–1947).

She realized oil paintings, but more and more was attracted by watercolour, more spontaneous for her. Nourished by the classicism of the Chardin of the still lifes, her painting evoke the impressionists by its luminosity, and in some works the Fauves by the technique of flat tints, and the play of colours.

Andrée Lavieille exhibited several times at Salon des Artistes Français, from 1911 to 1939.

== Bibliography ==
- Françoise Cambon, Henri Cambon. Dans le sillage des impressionnistes, Andrée Lavieille (1887–1960). Atlantica, 2007; Lelivredart, 2013.
- Henri Cambon, Françoise Cambon, Christelle Bellec, Jacqueline Duroc, Jacques Juloux. Une femme peintre au Pouldu, Andrée Lavieille (1887–1960). Lelivredart, 2012.
- Marie-Paule Piriou, Jean-Marc Michaud, Denise Delouche. Femmes artistes en Bretagne (1850–1950). Liv'Éditions, 2013.
