= The Book of the Knight of the Tower =

1371 book by Geoffroy IV de la Tour Landry

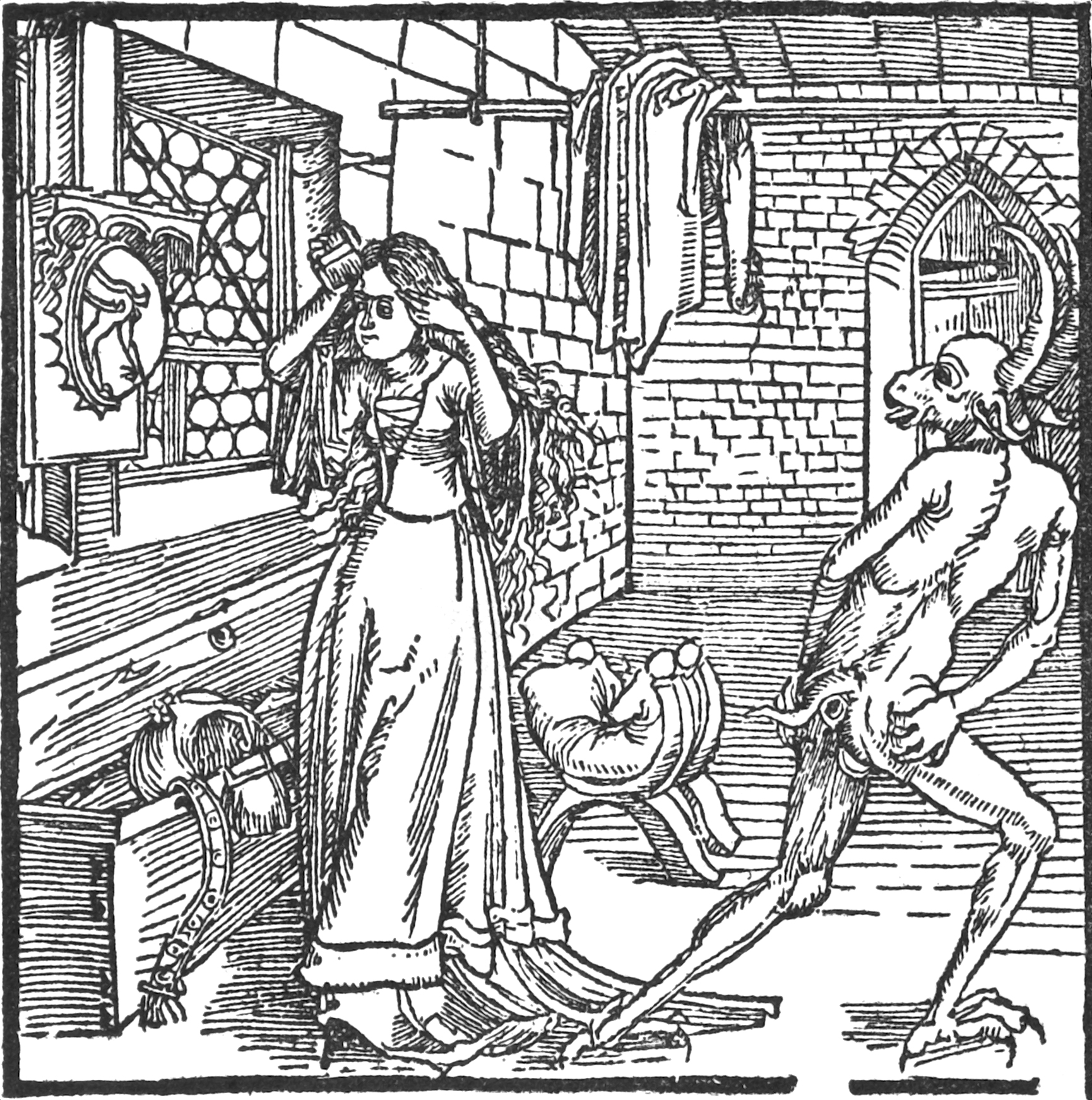
The demon of Vanity and the coquette. From the Ritter vom Turn, 1493

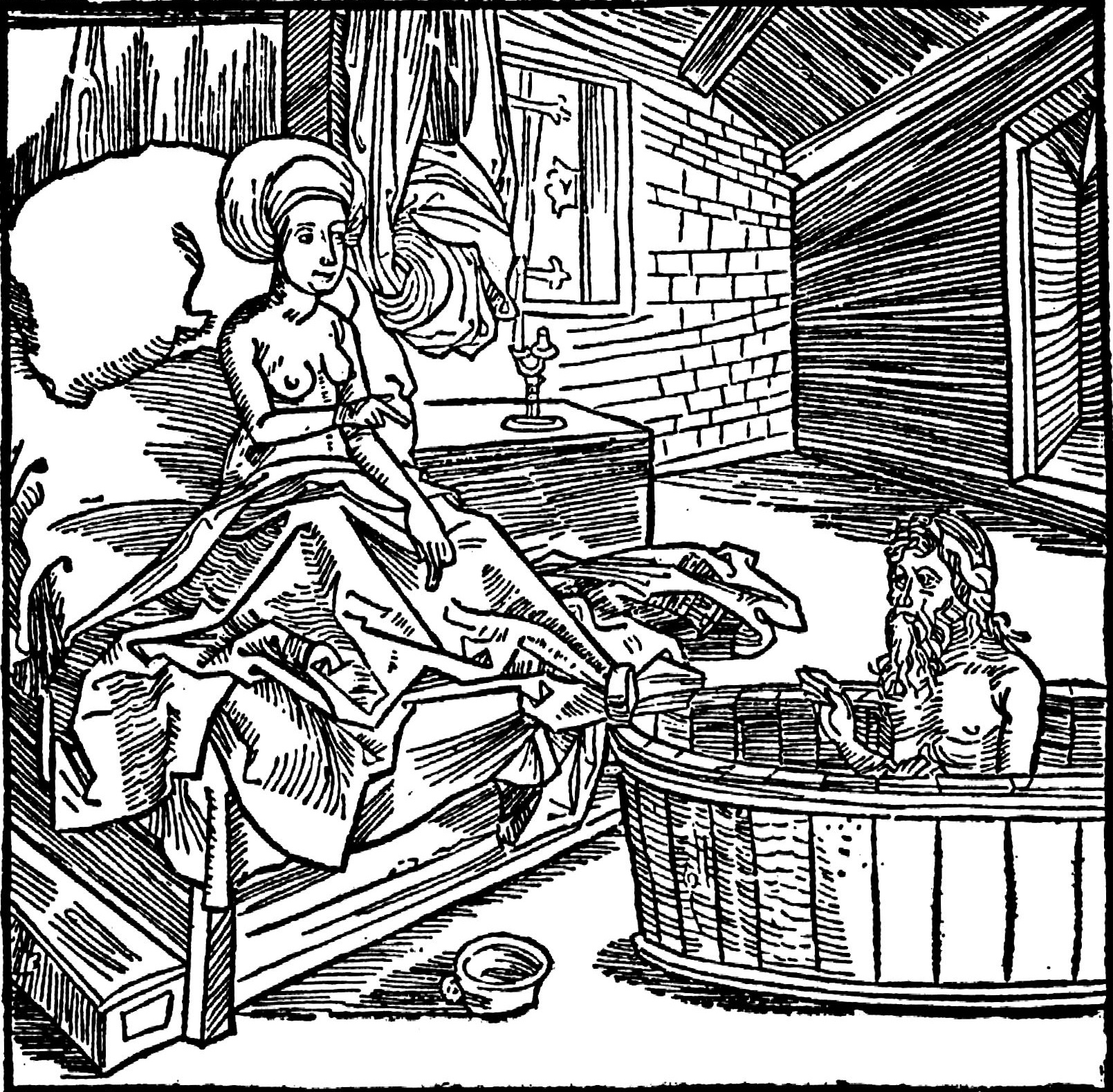
Woman and the bathing hermit

The Book of the Knight of the Tower (full French title: Livre pour l'enseignement de ses filles du Chevalier de La Tour Landry) is a book commenced by Geoffroy IV de la Tour Landry in 1371, and which he continued writing at least until 1372. It was translated into English (as The Book of the Knight of the Tower) by William Caxton and completed, according to his colophon, on 1 June 1483, during the reign of Edward V. It was further translated into German as Der Ritter vom Turn in 1493. The Livre pour l'enseignement de ses filles served as a tutorial for De la Tour Landry's daughters on proper behavior when visiting the royal court, which, the knight warns, is filled with smooth-talking courtiers who could potentially disgrace them and embarrass the family. The author was a widower, and concerned for his daughters' welfare. He takes a strong moral stance against the behavior of his peers and warns his daughters about the dangers of vanity.

The German Der Ritter vom Turm was the work of Marquard von Stain, a member of the Swabian nobility. He himself had two daughters, Elsa and Jakobea, for whose benefit he claims to have translated the French text.

Another English translation older than Caxton's survives in manuscript; British Library, Harley no. 1764. The manuscript was written in the reign of Henry VI of England.

== Bibliography ==
- Jacquin, Gérard (2000). "Éducation et culture de la noblesse en Anjou au XIVe siècle. Le Livre du chevalier de la Tour Landry pour l'enseignement de ses filles (1371)" [Education and Culture of the Nobility in Anjou in the 14th Century. The Book of the Knight of La Tour Landry for the Instruction of His Daughters]. Publications de l'École Française de Rome: 677–688..
