= Eugène Lavieille =

French painter (1820–1889)

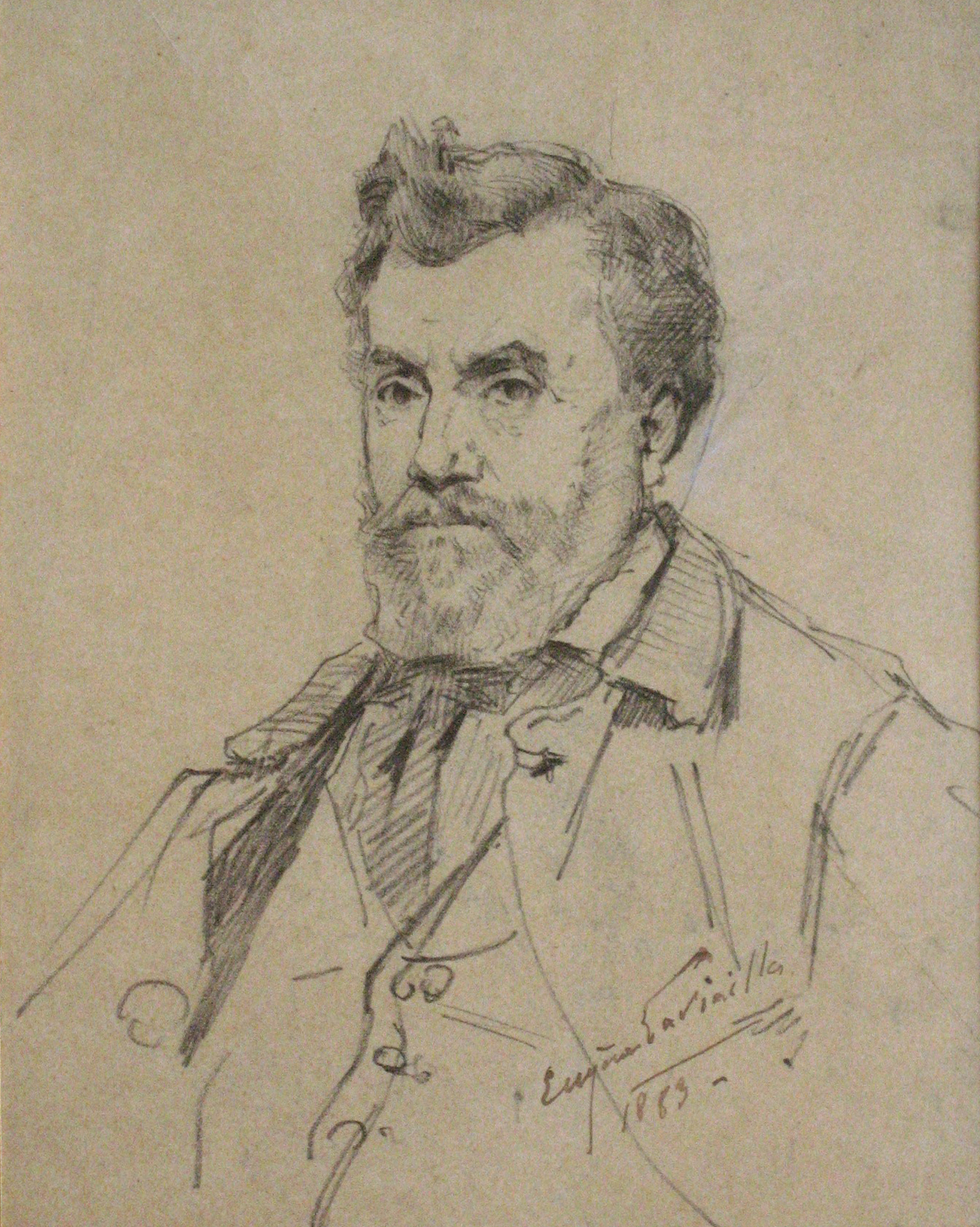
Self-portrait, 1883. Charcoak (private collection).

Eugène Lavieille (29 November 1820 in Paris – 8 January 1889 in Paris) was a French painter.

== Biography ==
His father was a tapestry maker and he was the younger brother of Adrien Lavieille 1818–1862), who became a famous wood-engraver. Eugène Lavieille began to work as a decorator painter but was drawn to painting. In 1841 he was accepted at the workshop of Corot becoming one of his better, more faithful disciples and later a friend. Eugène Lavieille soon devoted himself solely to painting despite financial difficulties and becoming a family man, marrying his first wife in 1847 (she died in 1848 soon after the birth of their son Adrien) and his second in 1852.

A nature lover, Eugène Lavieile painted outdoors whatever the weather. Frequent subjects of his paintings included trees, forests, fields, pools, farms, hamlet streets, riversides, ships on the strand and the flat coasts around Berck and some sites such as the château de Pierrefonds (Oise), or La Ferté-Milon. He evoked the quotidian life in the country, peasants in the fields, or conducting droves, cows grazing or crossing a ford, hinds or roe-deers in the woods. He painted during winter, or during the night. So, he will be considered by somebodies as a painter of the mournful heavens and of the snow, because he had a talent for expressing the atmosphere of December and January, the spoiled trees, the grey heavens and the so particular lights of that period of the year, and a painter of the nights, because he reproduced so strikingly their lights. However, he painted also the spring time, the flowered trees, the blue and clear heavens with lights clouds. In fact, his palette was large, and various, evolving during the years, and his paintings can be very luminous. It is also necessary to consider his drawings, with a great quality, a great surety of dashes, realized with a lot of delicacy.

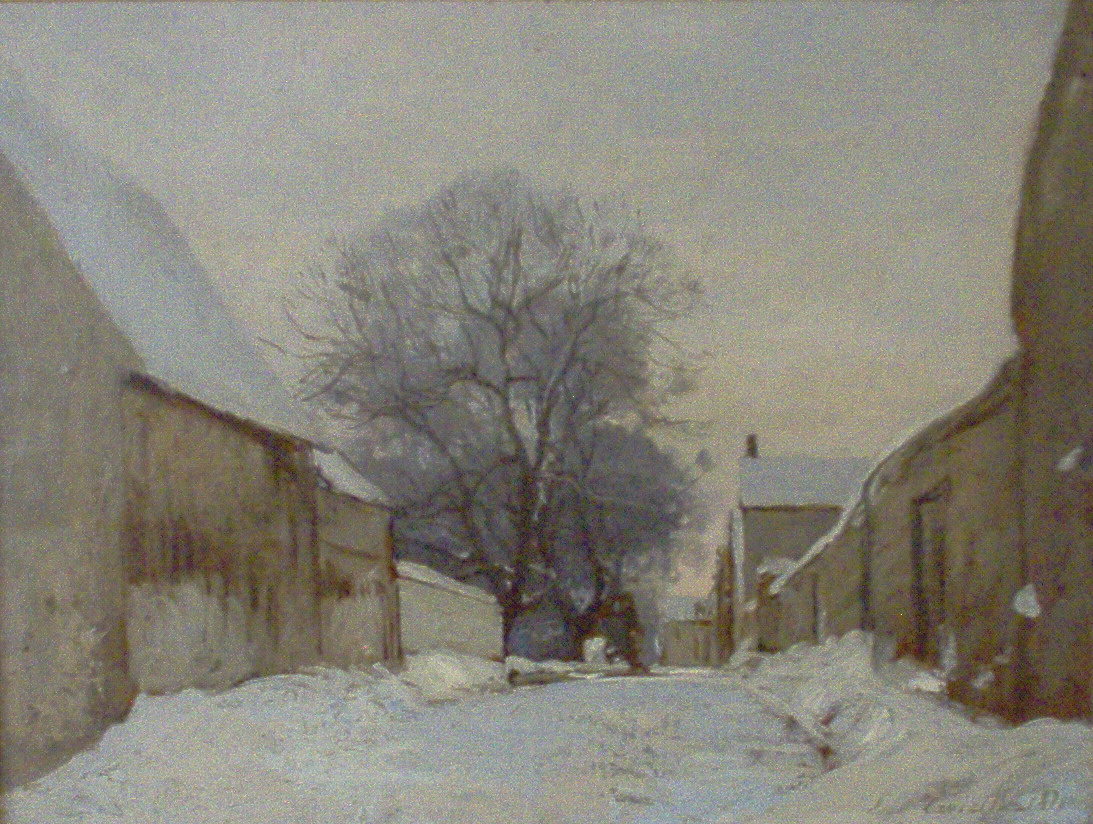
Paysage de neige. Oil painting, 1871 (private collection).

Around 1847, Eugène Lavieille painted with the Groupe de L'Isle-Adam. In 1852, he went for inhabit in Barbizon, where he lived about 4 years, and participated to the fruitful École de Barbizon. Later, he painted in La Ferté-Milon, and its surroundings, where he lived from 1856 to 1859 (and where he returned), Ville d'Avray, in the Perche in Normandy, on the Basque coast, in Seine-et-Marne near Moret-sur-Loing and at the end of his life in Courpalay. He painted also in Montmartre, as soon as 1848, and where he returned and settled him.

He had narrow contacts with the painters of his time : aside from Corot, with Millet, Rousseau, Daubigny, Diaz de la Pena, Troyon, Dupré, Ziem, Chintreuil, Léon Brunel-Rocque, Frédéric Henriet, Daumier, but also with the photographers Nadar and Carjat, who both realized a portrait of him, the man of letters Charles Asselineau…

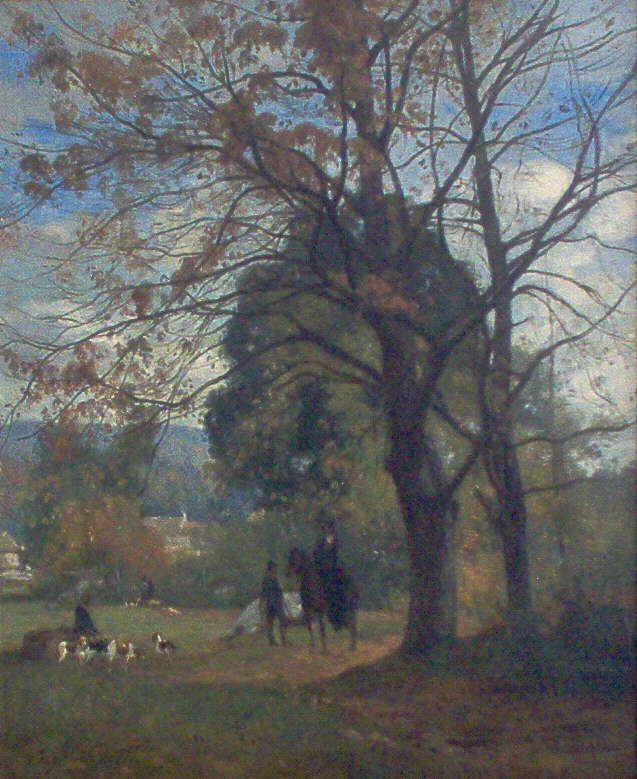
La Chasse. Oil painting (private collection).

His first participation to the Salon was in 1844. Afterward, he will participate to many Salons, or expositions, notably in different cities of France. Many of his paintings were bought by the administration or collectivities, during his life or later, and, now, are in museums of the Région parisienne or in the French province (Marseille, Lille, Moulins, Dijon, Nantes, Melun, Guéret, Alençon, Rouen, Grenoble), or in other countries (Cambridge, Metropolitan Museum of Art of New York City). Art critics as Baudelaire or Théophile Gautier were very interested by him, and he was more and more recognized. So, he was decorated as chevalier de la Légion d'honneur in 1878, after the exposition of La nuit à La Celle-sous-Moret, a painting which will be bought by the administration, and is in the museum of Melun. He lived by means of the sales of his paintings, particularly sales organized by himself.

However, he will pay with his health to have painting outside whatever the weather, and his difficult conditions of life. He died only 69 years old. At that moment, there was still more than 200 paintings in his workshop, just a part of his work, which was very vast…

His vocation of painter was continued by his son Adrien Lavieille, a landscape painter as him, and his daughter Marie Ernestine, born in 1852 (and who in 1878 get married with the sculptor Charles Georges Ferville-Suan), later by his granddaughter Andrée Lavieille.

== Bibliography ==
- Janine Bailly-Herzberg, L'art du paysage en France au XIX^{e} siècle, Flammarion, Paris (2000)
- Henri Cambon, Eugène Lavieille, peintre poète de la nature. De « l'école Barbizon » au pré-impressionnisme, Éditions L'Harmattan, Paris, 2023
- Noël Coret. Les peintres de la vallée de la Marne. Autour de l'impressionnisme, La Renaissance du Livre (2000)
- Frédéric Henriet, Eugène Lavieille, L'Art, Tome XLVI, p. 62–65 (1889)
- Pierre Miquel, Eugène Lavieille (1820–1889) in Le paysage français au XIX^{e} siècle. 1840–1900. L’école de la nature, Éditions de la Martinelle, vol. IV, p. 85–127. (1985)
- Georges Pillement, Eugène Lavieille in Les pré-impressionnistes. Les clés du temps, Zoug (Suisse), p. 138–145 (1974)
- Claude Royer, Eugène-Samuel Lavieille, paysagiste (1820–1889). Son attachement pour la région du Valois, Fédération des Sociétés d'Histoire et d'Archéologie de l'Aisne, Mémoires, Tome XLIII (L'Aisne et l'Art, destins d'artistes), p. 103–112.(1998)
