= Marie Ernestine Lavieille =

French painter

Marie Ernestine Lavieille (or Marie Lavieille) (October 11, 1852, in Barbizon – November 12, 1937 in Le Mans) was a French painter.

== Biography ==
She was a landscape artist, and studied under her father, Eugène Lavieille.

She exhibited from 1877 to 1890 at the Salon, which became the Salon des Artistes Français, and from 1882 to 1913 at the art exhibitions of the Union des Femmes Peintres et Sculpteurs.

In 1878 she married the French sculptor Charles Georges Ferville-Suan.

== Bibliography ==
- Émile Bellier de la Chavignerie and Louis Auvray. Dictionnaire général des artistes de l'École française depuis l'origine des arts du dessin jusqu'à nos jours. Renouard, Paris, 1882–1887. Reprint : Garland Publishing Inc., New York & London, 1979.
- Pierre Sanchez. Dictionnaire de l'Union des Femmes Peintres et Sculpteurs (1882–1965). L'Echelle de Jacob, 2010.
