= Marie Adrien Lavieille =

French painter

- Born: Marie Petit; November 22, 1852; Paris, France
- Died: March 13, 1911 (aged 58); Paris, France
- Known for: Painting
- Spouse: Adrien Lavieille (m. 1878)

Marie Adrien Lavieille (November 22, 1852, Paris – March 13, 1911, Paris), born Marie Petit, was a French painter. She was a pupil of her father, Jean-Jacques Petit, and of Joseph Blanc.

She painted a notable self-portrait in 1870, when she was 18 years old and first exhibited in 1876, and then on a regular basis at the Salon, which became the Salon des Artistes Français in 1881, and between 1886 and 1906 at the art exhibitions of the Union des Femmes Peintres et Sculpteurs.

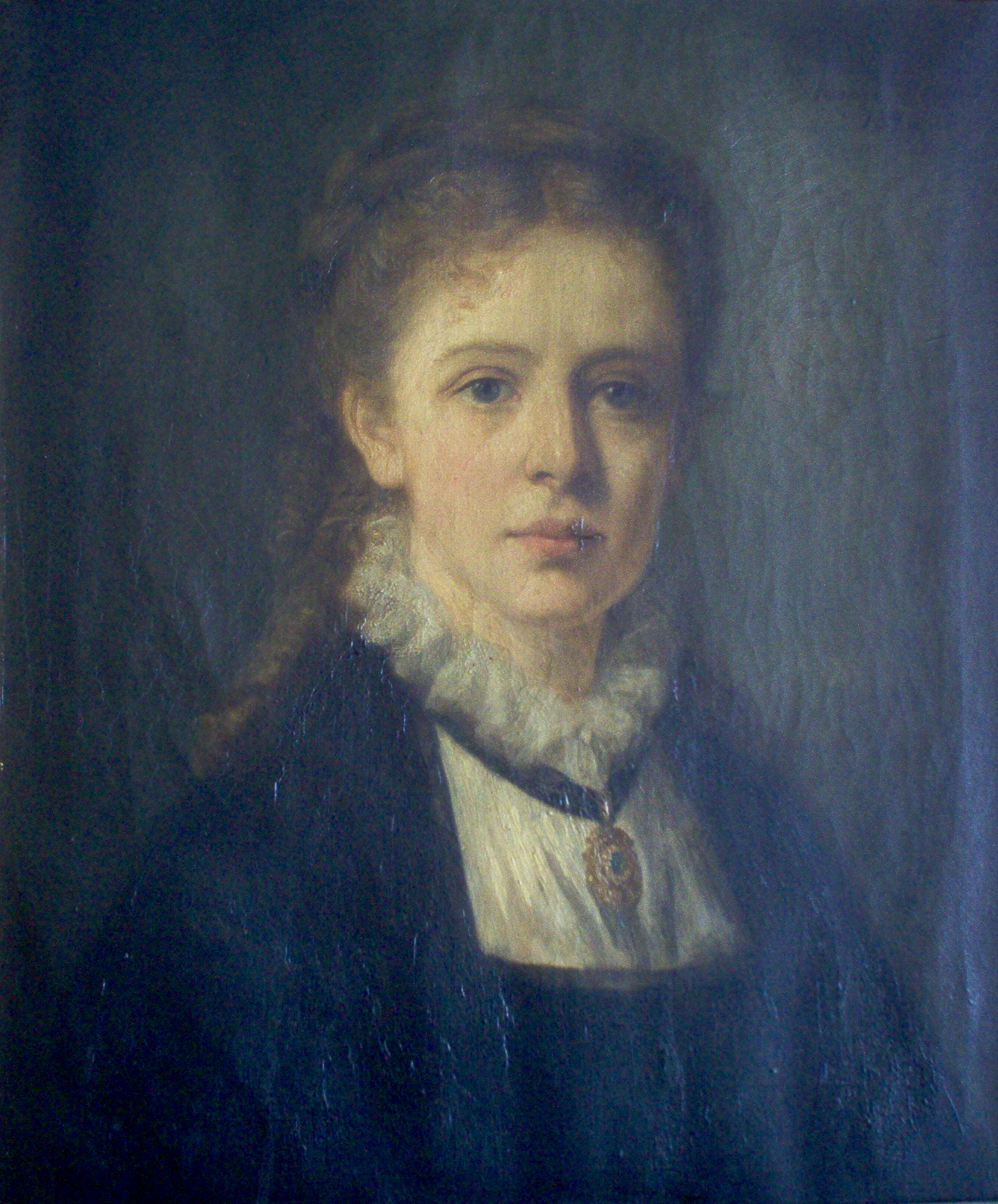
Self-portrait, 1870. Oil painting (private collection).

Marie Adrien Lavieille was a painter with a particular gift for portraits and still lifes. However, her work is very diversified, and reflects many of the themes of the society of her time. Her portrait subjects included her father, Jean-Jacques Petit, the painter Adrien Lavieille, whom she married in 1878, and her daughter, Andrée Lavieille, who also became a painter. As well as still lifes, she realized interiors, some landscapes, scenes of quotidian life, particularly with children : L'anniversaire, Sortie de classe, Maternité, Prière pour l'absent…

Since 1879, Marie Adrien Lavieille taught drawing in schools in Paris.

== Bibliography ==
- Henri Cambon, Françoise Cambon. Marie Adrien Lavieille (1852-1911). Une époque vue par une femme peintre. Atlantica, 2009.
- Pierre Sanchez. Dictionnaire de l'Union des Femmes Peintres et Sculpteurs (1882-1965). L'Echelle de Jacob, 2010.
