= Liederschiedt =

- Commune
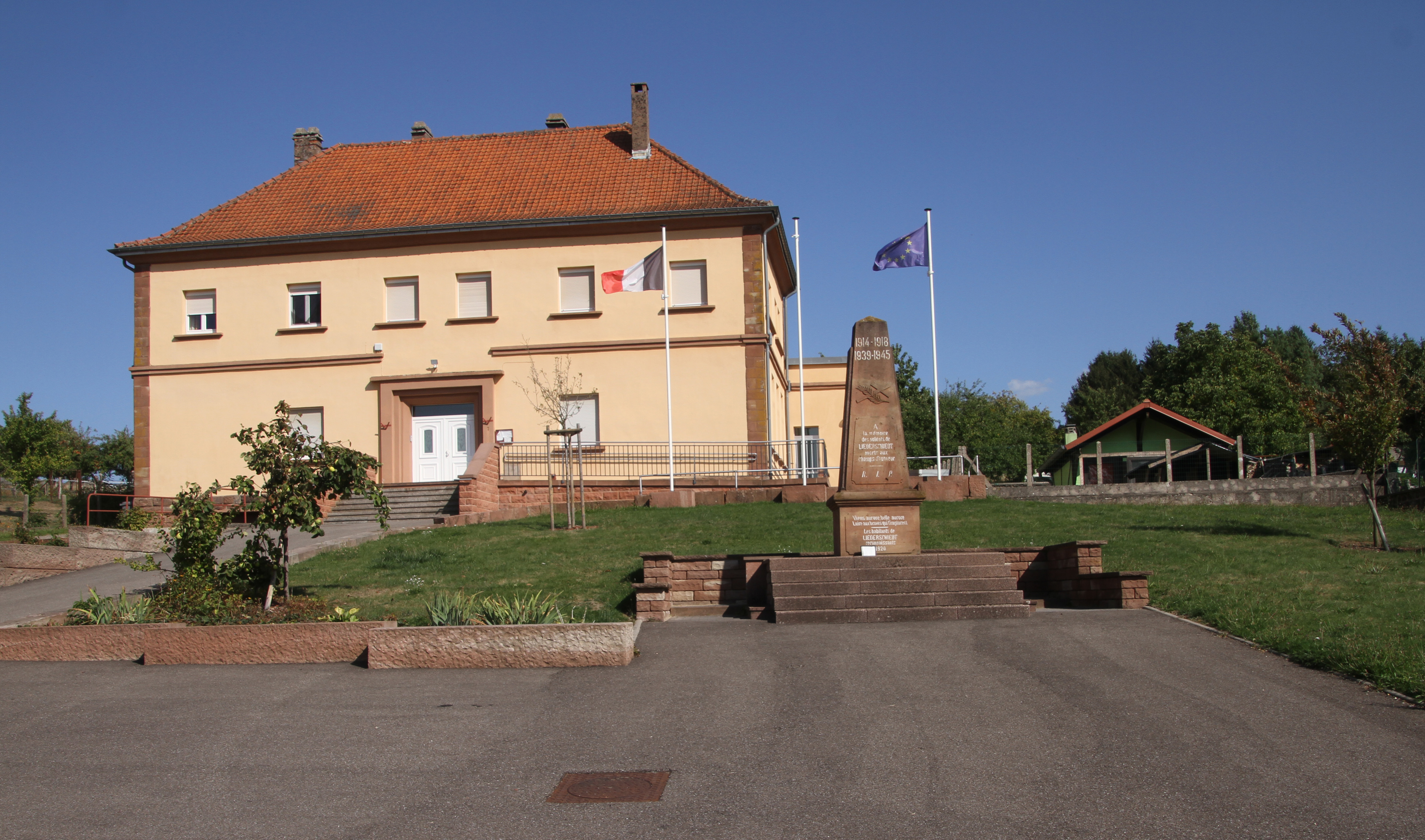
- Liederschiedt Town hall

- Coat of arms
- Location of Liederschiedt
- Location within France Location within Grand Est
- Coordinates: 49°07′19″N 7°30′00″E
- Country: France
- Region: Grand Est
- Department: Moselle
- Arrondissement: Sarreguemines
- Canton: Bitche
- Intercommunality: CC du Pays de Bitche

Government
  - Mayor (2020–2026): Étienne Megel
- Area^{1}: 5.99 km^{2} (2.31 sq mi)
- Elevation: 400 m (1,300 ft)
- Highest elevation: 422 m (1,385 ft)
- Lowest elevation: 257 m (843 ft)
- Population (2023): 116
  - Density: 19.4/km^{2} (50.2/sq mi)
- Time zone: UTC+01:00 (CET)
  - Summer (DST): UTC+02:00 (CEST)
- INSEE/Postal code: 57402 /57230
- ^{1} French Land Register data, which excludes lakes, ponds, glaciers > 1 km^{2} (0.386 sq mi or 247 acres) and river estuaries.

Liederschiedt (French pronunciation: [lidəʁʃit]; German: Liederscheidt; Lorraine Franconian: Lirerschidt) is a commune in the Moselle department of the Grand Est administrative region in north-eastern France.

The village belongs to the Pays de Bitche and to the Northern Vosges Regional Nature Park. It is located on the German border. It is situated on top of a large hill and surrounded mostly by forestry and farms that cover much of the area.

== History ==
It was first mentioned on a map of Sturzelbronn in 1313 under the name Ludenschiedt. The name was derived from two shepherds Leudo and Scheide. The town has shifted hands many times from France to Germany and also been the scene of many battles particularly during World War II. The main importance was that the town was on a hill that was very difficult to climb making the road through Liederschiedt vital to transporting weaponry such as jeeps and tanks. Today the route has been designated D86 B and has the name Rue Principale (Main Street).

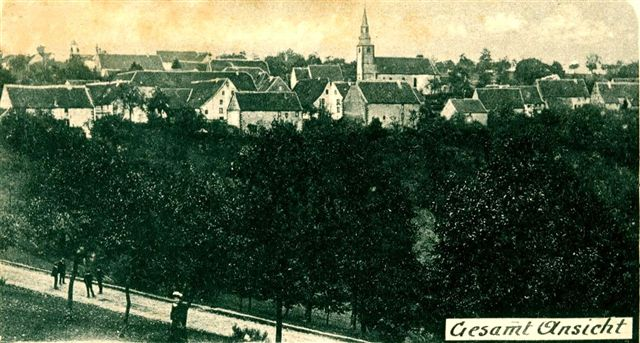
Liederschiedt in 1901

This has resulted in massive population shifts. In 1817 the village was home to 459 residents and by 1852 had reached a peak of 650. The population decreased to 132 people by 1999. The shift is mostly a result of World War II and the movement of people from Liederschiedt to the nearby town of Roppeviller. The population is also aging steadily and the majority of the town is over the age of fifty most likely the culprit for the decline over the past forty years.

Many families still remain in Liederschiedt though even after many generations the largest and possibly oldest are Hener and Megel. Other families include Mauss, Schwartz, Schaefer, Schunk, Wagner, Hauck, and Muller.

== Demographics ==
The town is virtually all Caucasian. The main difference is the heritage of the residents. The solid majority are French, but a significant portion of the town are German due to the closeness to the border. Like most rural areas in France there are not many Arabs like the cities however the town does have a number of residents from outside the European Union such as New Caledonia

== Natural resources ==
The area surrounding the town is very rich. The soil has been used for farming for many generations and today produces many crops especially cereals that can be used to make flour. Grasses and hay are grown to feed livestock such as cows, chickens, goats, and geese. Even more is produced today thanks to modern farming techniques and equipment. Indeed, without farming the town may have never existed since it is the main source of jobs.

Cows are probably the most important and prevalent animal since they produce milk and to a lesser extent are used for meat. In fact at one point there was even a laiterie (building used for the production of milk). Troughs were even constructed along a couple of roads from which the cows could drink. However, today the laiterie is now a private residence and the troughs are rarely used. Nowadays milk production is conducted in several large buildings on the outskirts of the village along Rue des Gardiens.

Another resource that is important to the inhabitants is wood. The surrounding forests provide a plentiful supply of wood that is used to provide heat in the winter using stoves, usually in basements, which heat water used in radiators and bathrooms.

== Buildings ==
The town is home to a number of buildings such as the homes of a number of farmers whose farms surround the town. The church is probably the most noticeable as its spire shoots up into the air over the village. The church was built following World War II on top of the ruins of what was once the town's first church. The graveyard however even after much fighting still has several graves dating back before the war.

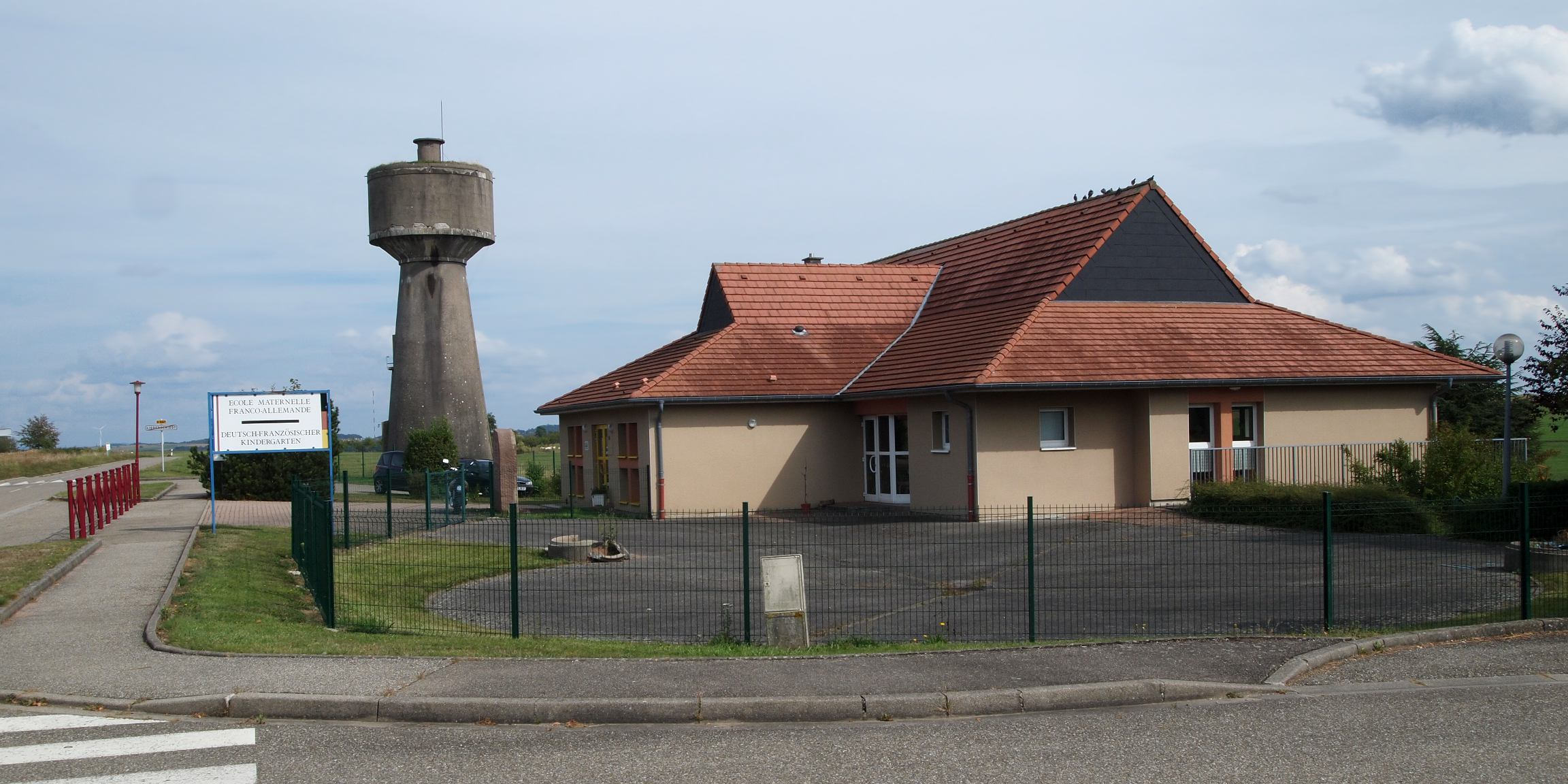
the watertower and the école maternelle

The second most significant building would probably be the town hall, which was at first an elementary school, but was closed after it became to costly to keep running. Today, a bilingual preschool is located on the opposite end of town next to the water tower another significant structure.

== Religion ==
Nearly all residents of the village are Christian and the solid majority practice Roman Catholicism. However, the number of attendees at the church in town has dwindled over the years and now the village only has mass once a month due to a shortage of priests in the area.

The church is dedicated to Saint-Wendelin also called Wendelin of Trier the patron saint of country people and herdsmen. The structure was built in 1821 and was built to replace a chapel constructed in 1755. The church was destroyed during World War II, but the residents were able to salvage the door. However, as the church was rebuilt the key was changed to the door to symbolize a new era.

The graveyard unfortunately suffered the same fate as the church for the most part. Today only two graves are left that date prior to World War II and World War I. One grave has lost its inscription and is gradually becoming overgrown. The other belongs to a young man named Cliln Miiller (6 April 1863 – 13 March 1876) and still bears an inscription, but a clear translation is unavailable since it is old German.

Indeed, the number of churchgoers has slid, but Christianity has for a long time been deep rooted in the village as shown through their monuments to God. Like much of Europe there are crosses that have been built over the years. In Liederschiedt there are actually five around the village. The oldest cross dates back to 1709 and is still standing despite some minor damage. Most were constructed thanks to generous families such as one built in 1927 by the Lang family. Another by the Hener-Wagner family and one from the Mauss-Megel family in 1964. There is also one last cross located in the center of town along the Rue Principale but no date nor sponsor is present.

== Government and politics ==
The current mayor is Joseph Schaefer, who has been in office since the 1990s.

The town has usually sided with the Union for a Popular Movement (UMP) during the Fifth Republic. This was evident in the 2002 election where Jacques Chirac received an overwhelming 78.11% of the vote in the second round against opponent Jean-Marie Le Pen of the Front National who trailed with 21.89%. However, in the first round Mr. Le Pen received the most votes with 23.67% versus Mr. Chirac who had only 18.99% and Socialist Party candidate Lionel Jospin with just 14.49%. This was once again apparent in 2007 where Nicolas Sarkozy received 30.57% in the first round while Segolene Royal took 22.08%. The second round wasn't much different with Sarkozy bringing in 56.56% and Royal with 43.44% in the Moselle region where Liederschiedt is located.

== World War I and World War II ==
The town lost a number of residents in both wars. World War I proved to be the worst with eleven dead, World War II however was also costly with the loss of nine lives. A memorial was constructed in 1920 for the fallen in World War I. The names are as follows: Nicolas Goettman (1883–1914), Jacques Schwartz (1882–1914), Jean Lang (1884–1915), Joseph Becker (1889–1915), Jacques Megel (1894–1915), Jeannic Cassiwn (1888–1916), Jean AD Lang (1879–1916), Guillaume Pung (1896–1916), Nicolas Schaefer (1888–1918), Auguste Goettmann (1883–1918), and Joseph Mathy (1893–1918). Not long after World War II more names were added to the memorial those lost were Charles Hener (1922–1943), Nicolas Geyer (1924–1943), Marcel Zuck (1919–1944), Edouard Muller(1915–1944), Pierre Kubler (1915–1944), and Gaston Mauss (1923–1945) all soldiers and two civilians: Jacques Mauss (1880–1940) and Andre Schunk (1939–1945) after playing with munitions.

== See also ==
- Communes of the Moselle department
