= Jules Barthélemy-Saint-Hilaire =

French writer and statesman (1805–1895)

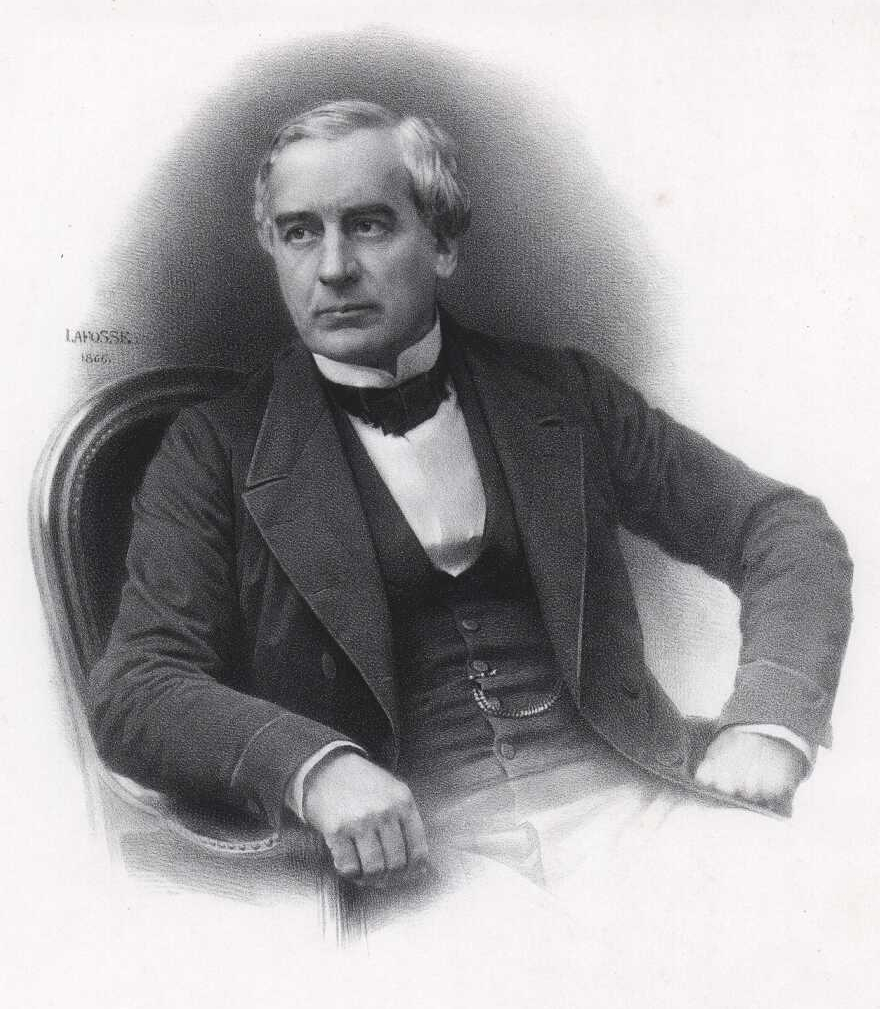
Jules Barthélemy-Saint-Hilaire

Jules Barthélemy-Saint-Hilaire (19 August 1805 – 24 November 1895) was a French philosopher, journalist, statesman, and possible illegitimate son of Napoleon I of France.

== Biography ==
Jules was born in Paris. Marie Belloc Lowndes, in the second volume of her autobiography Where Love and Friendship Dwelt (1943), made claims regarding his paternity. He was reportedly ashamed of and did not talk about it. Lowndes did not say who his mother was.

In his early years he worked for the Ministry of Finance (1825–1828), and was an active journalist. From 1826 to 1830 he opposed the policies of Charles X of France in Le Globe. At the revolution of 1830 he signed the protestation of the journalists on 28 July 1830.

After 1830, he contributed to different newspapers, Le Constitutionnel, Le National and Le Courrier français until 1833, when he gave up politics in order to devote himself to the history of ancient philosophy, undertaking a translation of Aristotle, which occupied him the greater part of his life. The reputation he gained from this work won him the chair of ancient philosophy at the Collège de France (1838) and a seat at the Academy of Moral and Political Science (1839).

After the revolution of 1848 he was elected as a republican deputy from the département of Seine-et-Oise. He was named by the Minister of Public Instruction, Carnot, head of the commission preparing the draft for the education reforms. However, after Carnot's resignation and replacement by Alfred de Falloux, the commission was dissolved. Nevertheless, Barthélémy-Saint-Hilaire deposed to the National Assembly the report and the propositions written by the commission, which were ignored. After the May 1849 legislative election, won by the conservative Parti de l'Ordre, he was however re-elected and named again as a member of the parliamentary commission on education. During three years, he thus played an important role during the debates leading to the adoption of the Falloux Laws in 1850–1851, which greatly increased the clergy's influence on education, to the dismay of Republicans such as Saint-Hilaire.

He was obliged to withdraw after the December 1851 coup d'état of Louis Napoleon. In 1855 he went as member of the international commission to Egypt to report on the possibility of the proposed Suez Canal, and by the articles which he wrote he contributed largely to making the project popular in France.

Elected deputy again in 1869, he joined the opposition to the Second Empire, and in 1871, as a member of the Centre gauche parliamentary group, bent all his efforts to the election of Thiers as President of the Republic, acting afterwards as his secretary. Appointed senator for life in 1875, he took his place among the moderate republicans (aka Opportunist Republicans), and from 23 September 1880 to 14 November 1881 was minister of foreign affairs in the cabinet of Jules Ferry. The most important event of his administration was the annexation of Tunis under the form of a French protectorate, which he actively promoted.

In 1882 the village of St. Hilaire, Minnesota, in the United States, was named in his honor.

He died in Paris in 1895. His principal works, besides the translation of Aristotle and a number of studies connected with the same subject, are Des Védas (1854), Du Bouddhisme (1856) and Mahomet et le Coran (1865).

== Works ==
- De la Logique d’Aristote. – Paris : Ladrange, 1838
- Ouverture du cours de philosophie grecque et latine. – Paris : H. Fournier, 1838
- De l’École d’Alexandrie : rapport à l’Académie des sciences morales et politiques, précédé d’un Essai sur la méthode des Alexandrins et le mysticisme. L’ouvrage contient en complément une traduction des morceaux choisis de Plotin. – Paris : Ladrange, 1845
- De la vraie Démocratie. – Paris : Pagnerre, 1849
- Des Védas. – Paris : B. Duprat, 1854 online
- Rapport concernant les mémoires envoyés pour concourir au prix de philosophie : proposé en 1848 et à décerner en 1853, sur la comparaison de la philosophie morale et politique de Platon et d’Aristote avec les doctrines des plus grands philosophes modernes sur les mêmes matières, au nom de la section de philosophie. Discours lu à l’Académie des sciences morales et politiques, dans la séance du 14 mai 1853. – Paris : Firmin Didot, 1854
- Du Bouddhisme. – Paris : B. Duprat, 1855 online
- Lettres sur L’Égypte. – Paris : Michel Lévy frères, 1856 online
- Le Bouddha et sa religion. – Paris : Didier, 1860
- Rapport fait au nom de la section de philosophie sur le concours relatif à la question du Beau. – Paris : Firmin Didot, 1862
- Mahomet et le Coran : précédé d’une Introduction sur les devoirs mutuels de la philosophie et de la religion. Le livre connaît un second tirage la même année. – Paris : Didier, 1865
- Du Boudhisme et de sa littérature à Ceylan et en Birmanie. – Hamburg, 1866
- De la Métaphysique : Introduction à la métaphysique d’Aristote. – Paris : Germer Baillière, 1879
- Le Christianisme et le boudhisme : trois lettres addressées à M. l’abbé Deschamps, la 1ère à l’occasion d’une publication de M. Deschamps, ayant pour titre Le Boudhisme et l’apologétique chrétienne; la 2e en réponse à l’envoi d’une étude biblique du même auteur ayant pour titre La Découverte du livre de la loi et la théorie du coup d’état d’après les derniers travaux; la 3e qui confirme les deux précédentes et en autorise la publication. – Paris : Ernest Laroux, 1880 online
- L’Inde anglaise, son état actuel, son avenir : précédé d’une introduction sur l’Angleterre et la Russie. – Hamburg, 1887
- La Philosophie dans ses rapports avec les sciences et la religion. – Paris : F. Alcan, 1889 online
- Étude sur François Bacon : suivie du Rapport à l’Académie des sciences morales et politiques, sur le concours ouvert pour le prix Bordin. – Paris : F. Alcan, 1890
- Aristote et l’histoire de la Constitution athénienne. – Paris : Administration des deux revues, 1891 online
- M. Victor Cousin, sa vie et sa correspondance. – Paris : Hachette, 1892 online
- Traduction générale d’Aristote. Table alphabétique des matières. – Paris : F. Alcan, 1892
- Socrate et Platon, ou le Platonisme. – Chartres : Durand, 1896

=== Modern editions ===
- The Buddha and His Religion. – Rupa & Co, 2002. – ISBN 81-7167-730-4

=== Translations ===
- Pensées de Marc-Aurèle. – Paris : G. Baillière, 1876 online
- Physique d'Aristote ou Leçons sur les principes généraux de la nature. – Paris : Ladrange : A. Durand, 1862 Volume I, Volume II
- Politique d'Aristote. – Paris : Ladrange, 1874 online
- Psychologie d'Aristote: Opuscules (Parva Naturalia), Paris: Dumont, 1847 online

== Notes ==
Political offices
Preceded by Charles de Freycinet	Minister of Foreign Affairs; 1880–1881	Succeeded by Léon Gambetta
