= University of France =

19th-century centralized education system in France

The University of France (French: Université de France; originally the Imperial University or Université impériale) was a highly centralized educational state organization founded by Napoleon I in 1806 and given authority over both the individual (previously independent) universities and also primary and secondary education. The former individual universities were henceforth to be known as "academies" (such as the Académie de Paris), but each still retained a rector and local board of its own. The University of France was disbanded in 1896.

== History ==
On 15 September 1793, petitioned by the Department of Paris and several other departments, the National Convention decided that, independently of the primary schools,

there shall be established in the Republic three progressive degrees of instruction; the first for the knowledge indispensable to artisans and workmen of all kinds; the second for further knowledge necessary to those intending to embrace the other professions of society; and the third for those branches of instruction the study of which is not within the reach of all men.

The decree of March 17, 1808, set out the operation of the university. The university would provide all levels of education, and no one could teach without the permission of the Grand Master, part of the university. The text provided six schools: the faculties (theology, law, medicine, humanities, sciences), schools, colleges, institutions, residential schools and "small schools" (primary).

Schools of law and medicine created at the end of the Revolution were integrated into the university, as were theological education, literature and science. The decree established the general organisation of these teachings, degrees (three types: bachelor, license, and PhD) and examinations. As for schools, the text established several types of education officials, fourteen of directors and five of teaching. In particular, it set the qualifications to be part of different ranks.

The Imperial Decree of 17 March 1808, which determined the organisation of the university, established in Paris a boarding normal school (now the École normale supérieure in rue d'Ulm) for training up to 300 young people in the art of teaching the humanities and sciences. The number of students was set at 100 for the first year: they were to be under 17 years of age and allowed by their father or guardian to follow the career of the university. They pledged to stay at least ten years in the teaching profession. They were chosen according to tests by the inspectors general of the university. A first cohort of 54 students was selected from the departments, was made by Mgr. the Grand Master of the Imperial University.

Administratively, the university was entrusted to a grand master (Jean-Pierre Louis de Fontanes), appointed and dismissed by the Emperor, assisted by a treasurer and a Chancellor (John Chrysostom Villaret). The decree also provided for a University Council, composed of 30 members divided into 5 sections, and composed entirely of executives of the university.

The decree established an academy within the jurisdiction of each Court of Appeal, headed an academy rector assisted by an academic board.

The university enjoyed a considerable amount of autonomy in relation to the other jurisdictions even if it was closely related to the Emperor. Although the text did not expressly grant it legal personality, it was considered a legal person, with its own budget.

Measures were to be taken immediately by "means of execution, the department and the municipality of Paris are authorised to consult with the Committee of Public Instruction of the National Convention, in order that these establishments shall be put in action by 1 November, and consequently colleges now in operation and the faculties of theology, medicine, arts, and law are suppressed throughout the Republic".

All faculties were replaced by the University of France. After a century, people recognised that the new system was less favourable to study. The University of France was disbanded in 1896, when the universities regained a relative independence (but still within a centralised national system, with the Ministry of Education as the highest authority).

== After Napoleon ==
In the first years of the Restoration, the full name of the university tended to lapse because of its imperial origin. The council of the university took the name from the Board of Education (1815–1820), then the Royal Education Council (1820–1822). If the title of Grand Master was removed, the president of the committee responsible was made the figure of Grand Master.

The latter name was, moreover, restored in 1822. The creation of a Ministry of Ecclesiastical Affairs and Public Instruction did not affect the university, but the functions of the Ministry of Public Instruction and the Grand Master were indistinguishable from 1828.

During the years afterwards, in particular the July Monarchy, the university symbolised public education, centralised and judged by its critics as not Catholic enough (although it was not strictly secular), as opposed to private education, especially denominational. Supporters of freedom of education opposed the university.

They got some satisfaction within the two royal regimes but got, during the Second Republic, two important changes in 1850. The Falloux Act, promulgated on March 15, grants a significant portion to the freedom of education (except for the top) and decentralised and weaken public education by creating an academy for every department: "This is not the University multiplied by 86, this is the University divided by 86". The act also change the name of the University Council to the Supreme Council of Public Instruction. As for the Finance Act of 1851, it operated the transfer of assets of the State University, which tended to suppress the university without official declaration. With the arrival of the Second Empire, the term reappeared to apply it before the link between the Napoleon III's Empire and its predecessor. Even so, the term is more often involved in the University of France (and not imperial).

However, the Third Republic greatly contributes to the declining term, when the act of July 10, 1896 (known as the Louis Liard law) assigned legal personality to the "bodily faculties" made in each academy by the Act of April 28, 1893, giving them the name of universities.

There was a university in each academy and the term of the "University of France", as a unified whole, made little sense. The term nevertheless remains, especially in decree No. 48-1108 of July 10, 1948, on the ranking of the state of civilians and military personnel.

== See also ==
- History of education in France

== Bibliography ==
- Gerber, Adolph. "Modern Languages in the University of France. I." Modern Language Notes 3.1 (1888): 1–5. online
  - Part II online
- Johnston, David. A general view of the present system of public education in France : and of the laws, regulations, and courses of study in the different faculties, colleges, and inferior schools, which now compose the Royal University of that kingdom : preceded by a short history of the University of Paris before the Revolution (1827) online
- Weisz, George. The emergence of modern universities in France, 1863-1914 (Princeton University Press, 2014).
