= Oô =

- Commune
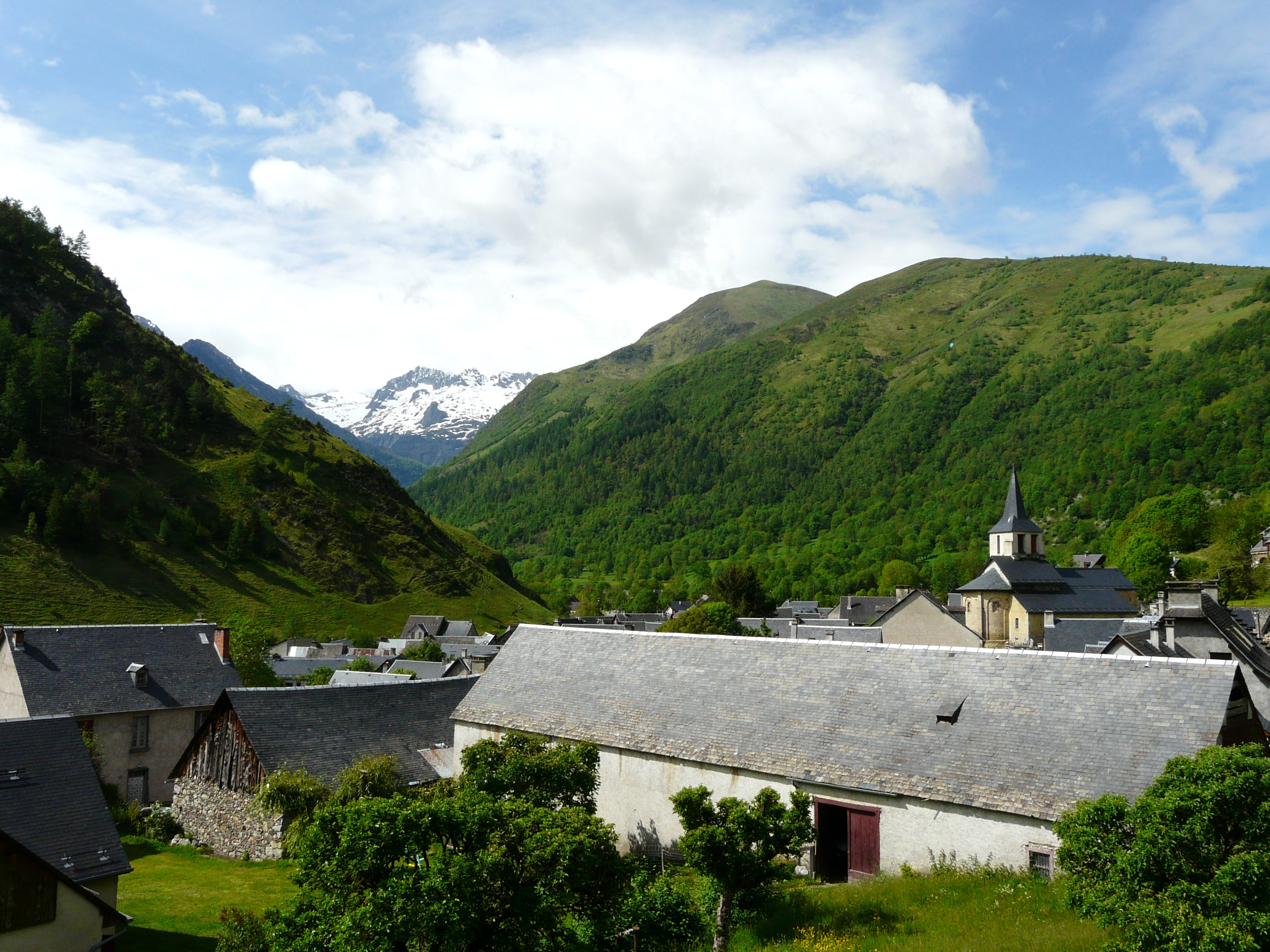
- A view within Oô
- Location of Oô
- Location within France Location within Occitanie
- Coordinates: 42°47′54″N 0°30′26″E
- Country: France
- Region: Occitania
- Department: Haute-Garonne
- Arrondissement: Saint-Gaudens
- Canton: Bagnères-de-Luchon

Government
  - Mayor (2020–2026): Jean-Jacques Rives
- Area^{1}: 32.53 km^{2} (12.56 sq mi)
- Elevation: 980 m (3,220 ft)
- Highest elevation: 3,215 m (10,548 ft)
- Lowest elevation: 954 m (3,130 ft)
- Population (2023): 104
  - Density: 3.20/km^{2} (8.28/sq mi)
- Time zone: UTC+01:00 (CET)
  - Summer (DST): UTC+02:00 (CEST)
- INSEE/Postal code: 31404 /31110
- ^{1} French Land Register data, which excludes lakes, ponds, glaciers > 1 km^{2} (0.386 sq mi or 247 acres) and river estuaries.

Oô (French pronunciation: [ɔ.o]; Occitan: Òu; Catalan: ou [ɔw] 'egg') is a commune in the Haute-Garonne department in the Occitanie region in southwestern France. It borders Spain on its southern side.

== Population ==
Historical population
Year	Pop.	±% p.a.
1968	103	—
1975	117	+1.84%
1982	106	−1.40%
1990	105	−0.12%
1999	108	+0.31%
2007	107	−0.12%
2012	106	−0.19%
2017	92	−2.79%
2023	104	+2.06%
Source: INSEE

Its inhabitants are called Ousiens in French.

== Geography ==
The Lac d'Oô is situated in the commune.

== See also ==
- Communes of the Haute-Garonne department
