= Sophie Swetchine =

Russian mystic (1782–1857)

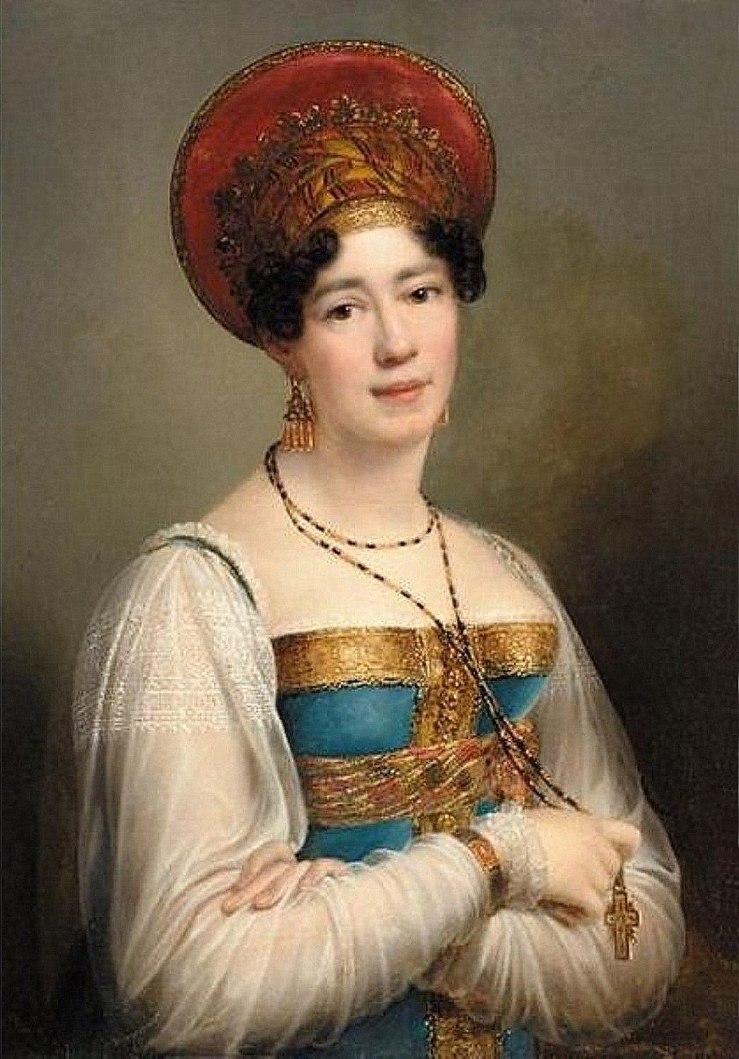
Madame Swetchine

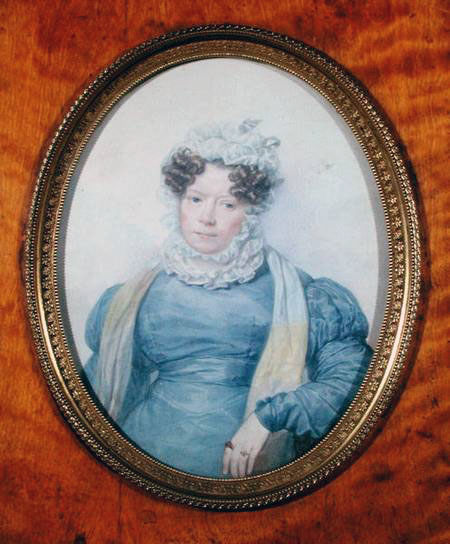
Sophie Swetchine

Anne Sophie Swetchine, or Sophia Petrovna Swetchine (Russian: Софья Петровна Свечина, romanized: Sofya Petrovna Svechina; née Soymonova; 22 November 1782 – 10 September 1857), known as Madame Swetchine, was a Russian Catholic mystic born in Moscow who was famous for her salon in Paris.

== Biography ==
She was born Sofia Petrovna Soymonova (sometimes Soïmonov or Soymanof) on 22 November 1782 in Moscow, the daughter of Secretary of State Peter Alexandrovich Soimonov (1734–1801) and his wife, Catherine Boltin (1756–1790).

She spent her early years at the court of Empress Catherine the Great, as her father was one of the empress's closest advisors. She was given a good education, learned to speak several European languages and was popular at court. In 1797, she was made lady-in-waiting to Empress Maria Fedorovna. In 1799, Sophie married General Nicholas Sergeyevich Swetchine. Even though he was his wife's senior by 25 years, their relationship was described by contemporaries as a good one, though the couple did not have children, which is said to have caused her suffering.

Coming from Russian Orthodoxy, in 1815 she became a Catholic, largely as the result of reading the writings of Joseph de Maistre, though she had also been under the influence of the Jesuits. Russian law did not permit members of the Russian nobility who had converted from the Orthodox religion to continue living in Russia, and so Sophie was forced to live in exile, choosing Paris as her new home. There she settled with her husband the following year and there she was to spend the rest of her life.

From 1826 until her death in 1857, she kept a salon at number 71, Rue Saint-Dominique. It became famous and was considered remarkable for its high level of courtesy and for its intellectual level. At it she often received Russian exiles, but her guests, who included Victor Cousin and Alexis de Tocqueville, were generally drawn from various sectors of French literary, political and ecclesiastical high society. The salon also had a special interest in the Church. Hence among her guests were prominent Catholics such as the Archbishop of Paris, Hyacinthe-Louis de Quélen, the abbé Félix Dupanloup, later Bishop of Orleans, and Prosper Guéranger, the founder of the Abbey of Solesmes. A prominent note was what has been spoken of as liberal Catholicism, and she accorded a particularly warm welcome to Charles de Montalembert, Armand de Melun, Augustin Cochin and especially Alfred de Falloux and Henri Lacordaire, who was to refound the Dominican Order in France. With the latter two she maintained a close lifelong friendship. Through her many contacts, she is regarded as having exercised an influence on French Catholicism.

== Works ==
Her works were published posthumously by her friends. Her Life and Works (the best known of the latter being "Old Age" and "Resignation") were published by her friend Falloux (2 vols, 1860), as were her Letters (2 vols., 1861).

== Quotes ==
Madame Swetchine is noted for the quotation: "How easy to be amiable in the midst of happiness and success." She was reported to have said that "Travel is the frivolous part of serious lives and the serious part of frivolous lives."

== Sources ==
- "Свечина, Софья Петровна" . Brockhaus and Efron Encyclopedic Dictionary (in Russian). 1906.
- Sainte-Beuve, Nouveaux lundis, vol. i.
- E Scherer, Etudes sur la littérature contemporaine, vol. i.
- Bain, Robert Nisbet (1911). "Swetchine, Madame" . In Chisholm, Hugh (ed.). Encyclopædia Britannica. Vol. 26 (11th ed.). Cambridge University Press. p. 224.
- Maturin M Ballou, "Travels Under the Southern Cross" Houghton Mifflin, NY, 1894
