= History of education in France =

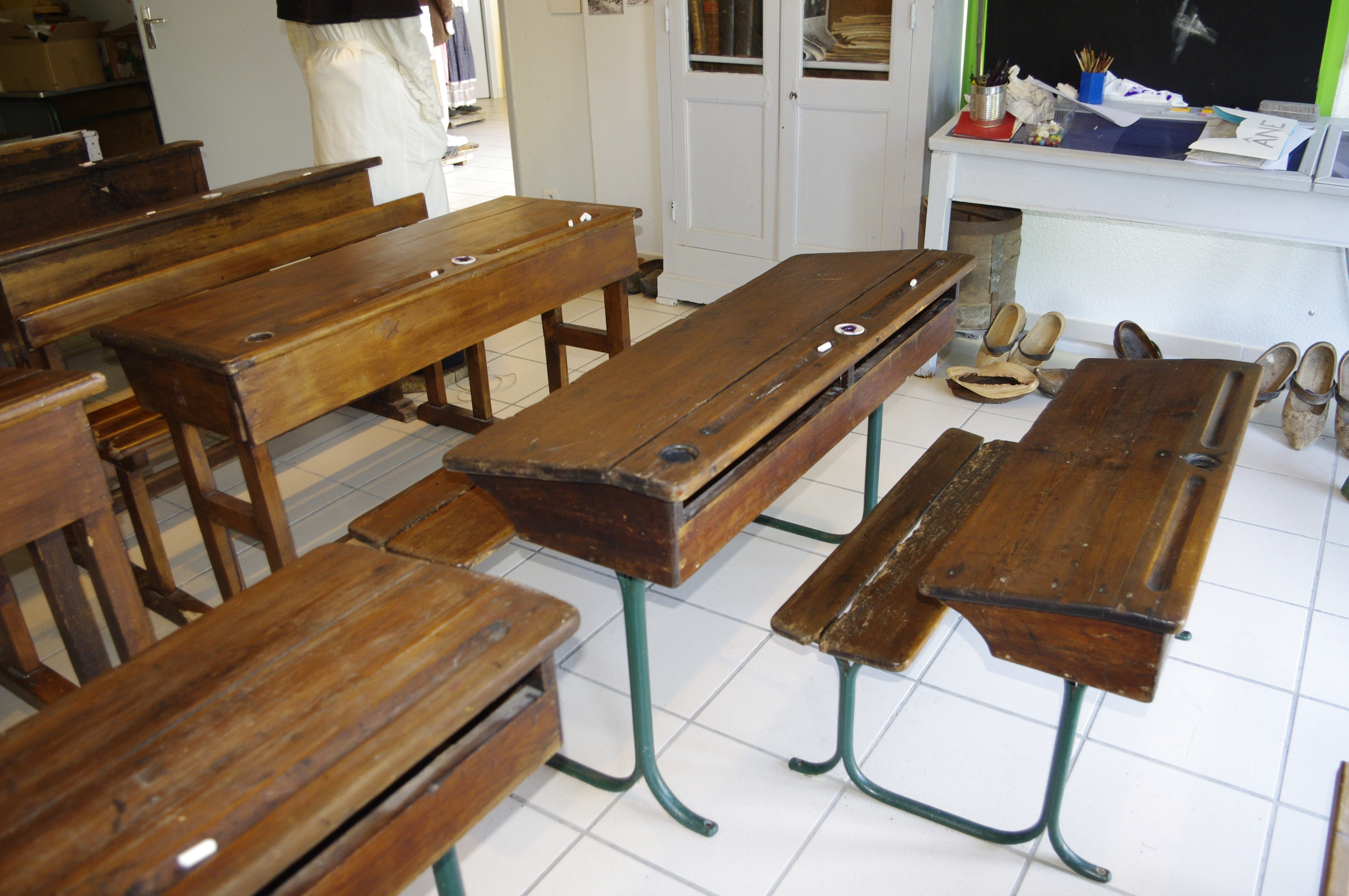
Typical school furniture of the period 1930 to 1950; Cité Découverte Nature at Miallet, Dordogne

The education system in France can be traced back to the Roman Empire. Schools may have operated continuously from the later empire to the early Middle Ages in some towns in southern France. The school system was modernized during the French Revolution, but roughly in the 18th and early 19th century debates ranged on the role of religion.

== Gaul and Roman empire ==
Prior to the establishment of the Roman empire, education in Gaul was a domestic task or provided by itinerant druids traveling in the Celtic Western Europe. Latin schools were later established by wealthy patricians.

== Middle Ages ==
Charlemagne greatly increased the provision of monastic schools and scriptoria (centres for book-copying) in Francia. In 789, he published the Admonitio generalis, ordering that each bishopric organises a school for non-ecclesiastic students, which makes Charlemagne - not without exaggeration - to be considered the father of education in France. As in other parts of medieval Western Europe, literacy was mainly in Latin. Church schools associated to abbeys and cathedrals developed from the 8th century onwards and were controlled by the Catholic Church. The University of Paris was one of the first universities in Europe, created possibly as early as 1150. Grammar schools, often situated in cathedrals, taught the Latin language and law.

Universities were formally established in the 12th century onwards, including Université de Paris (1150), Université de Toulouse (1229), Université d'Orléans (1235), Université de Montpellier (1289), Université d'Avignon (1303), Université de Cahors (1331), Université de Grenoble (1339), Université de Perpignan (1350), Université d'Angers (1364), Université d'Orange (1365), Université d'Aix (1409), Université de Dole (1423), Université de Poitiers (1431), Université de Caen (1432), Université de Valence (1452), Université de Nantes (1461), Université de Bourges (1464), Université de Douai (1559) and others.

== Earlier modern period ==
In the early modern period, colleges were established by various Catholic orders, notably the Oratorians. In parallel, universities further developed in France. Louis XIV's Ordonnance royale sur les écoles paroissiales of 13 December 1698 obliged parents to send their children to the village schools until their 14th year of age, ordered the villages to organise these schools, and set the wages for the teachers.

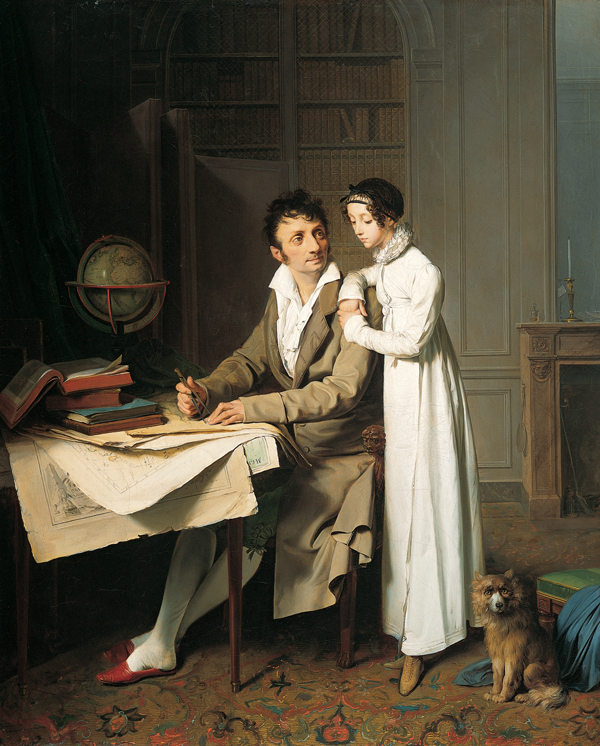
The Geography Lesson (Portrait of Monsieur Gaudry and His Daughter)'; by Louis-Léopold Boilly, 1812

== Revolution ==
By 1710 France had about 360 eight-year and six-year colleges; they provided classical education to about 50,000 young men from the ages of 10 to 20. Some were centuries old, and most gave scholarships to their students. They were primarily funded by cash endowments and farmlands, but in 1789 during the French Revolution, the government seized their endowments and properties and dismissed priests and church-controlled teachers. The plan was for local governments to take up the burden while the central government set up a new system of advanced schools. The new funding plan was not effective for years and meanwhile many of the schools closed or struggled after a 92% reduction in income. By 1793 the national government sold off properties because it needed the money for its foreign wars. A similar treatment was given charitable institutions.

Condorcet in 1792 drew up plans for universal schooling, but it was based on the assumption that the historic endowments would be available. The endowments were diverted to military expenses in 1793 and Condorcet's plan was not adopted.

New secondary schools were established in the larger cities, and were open to all young men of talent. Liberal education, including especially modern sciences, became possible and widespread. It was geared to young men who would become bureaucrats in the new regime. A short-lived "loi Bouquier" (29 frimaire an II) was soon replaced by the "loi Daunou" of 3 brumaire an IV (25 October 1795), which organises the elementary schools, taking away the compulsoriness, and reinstating school fees.

Faculties of the Université de France were organised as four categories (law, medicine, sciences, humanities), under the strict supervision from the government.

After more than a decade of closures, Napoleon set up lycées in 1802 as the main secondary education establishments targeting baccalauréat examinations. They taught French, Latin, Ancient Greek and sciences. A law of 1808 fixed the syllabus as "ancient languages, history, rhetoric, logic, music and the elements of mathematical and physical sciences". They were usually boarding schools under military-like discipline.

In parallel to faculties of law, medicine, sciences, humanities in the universities, grandes écoles were established as specialized higher education institutions focusing on sciences and engineering. The term came after the French Revolution, with the creation of the École normale supérieure by the National Convention and the École polytechnique. Actually, their forerunners were civil servant schools aimed at graduating mine supervisors (École des mines de Paris established in 1783), bridge and road engineers (École royale des ponts et chaussées established in 1747), shipbuilding engineers (École des ingénieurs-constructeurs des vaisseaux royaux established in 1741) and five military engineering academies and graduate schools of artillery established in the 17th century in France, such as the École de l'artillerie de Douai (established in 1697) and the École du génie de Mézière (established in 1748), wherein mathematics, chemistry and sciences were already a major part of the curriculum taught by first rank scientists such as Pierre-Simon Laplace, Charles Étienne Louis Camus, Étienne Bézout, Sylvestre François Lacroix, Siméon Denis Poisson, Gaspard Monge.

=== Growth 1815: to 1907 ===
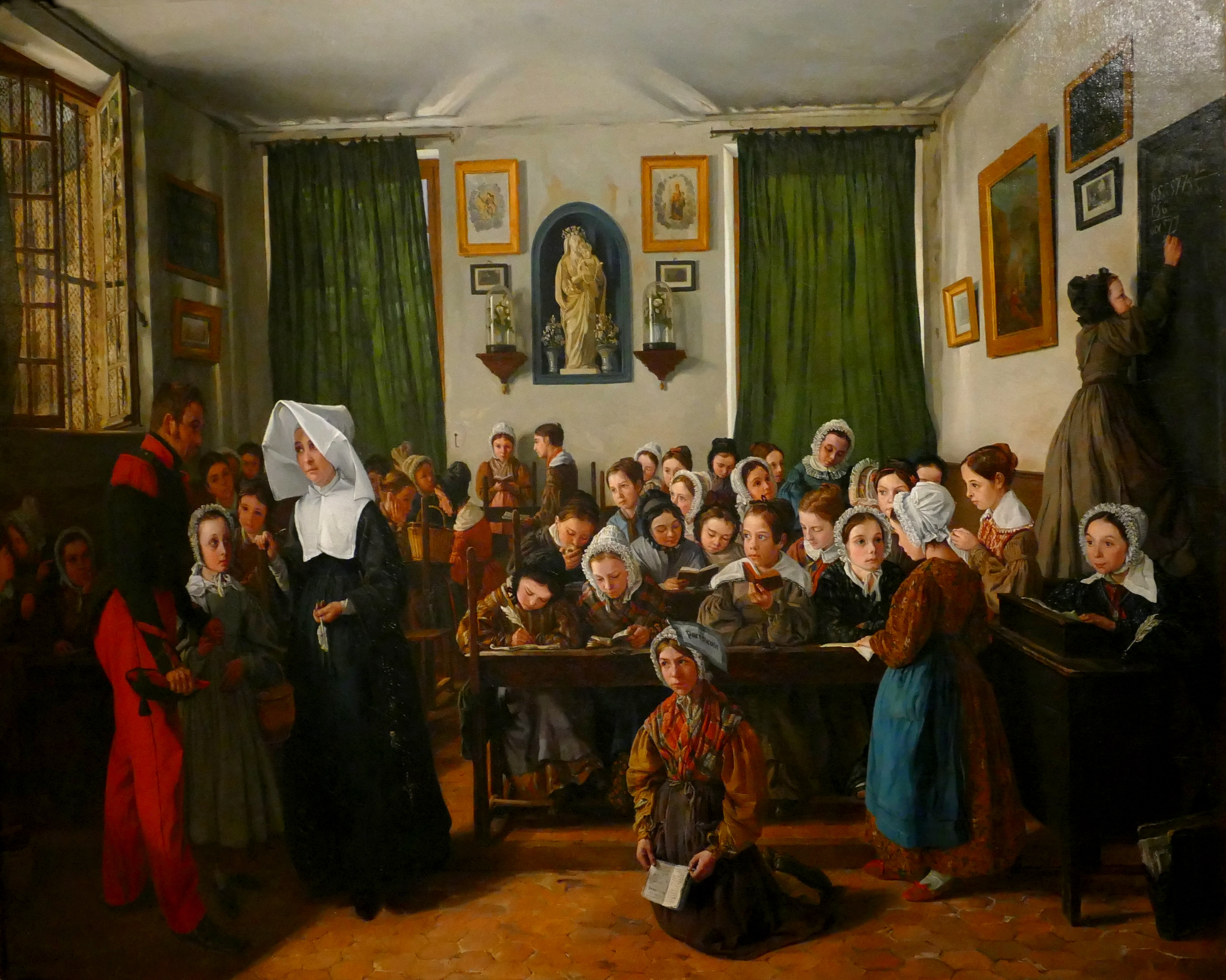
"École chrétienne à Versailles"; by Antoinette Asselineau; 1839

Statistical analysis of census data indicates the steady spread of universal, compulsory, elementary education. The highest growth rate was 1821–37 when cities welcomed schools. Growth rates slowed in 1837–67 as the movement reached thinly populated rural areas. By 1867–1906 the emphasis was on deepening the quality of schools and teaching. National pressure was the dominant factor, but there were variations according to local initiative and resistance. Commercial and manufacturing interests sponsored more schools in their districts to obtain a more skilled work force capable of more complex operations such as sales, accounting, and supervising. Critical innovations included kindergartens, and multiroom schools, school and municipal libraries.

An act which was proposed by Camille Sée in 1880 brought secondary schools for girls. There were 36 such schools in 1896. Secondary schooling became free of charge between 1926 and 1930. and thus became more accessible to the working class.

Total spending on the public system of secondary schools in 1865 was 28 million francs a year. Three-quarters of the money was tuition paid by the parents, and only 5.9 million francs came from the national and local governments. However, families spent even more money for private schools, lay and Catholic, which in 1865 enrolled more pupils than the public system at the secondary level.

=== Political battles ===
Catholic and secular or anti-religious forces played powerful local roles. Educational policy was highly politicized and used as a weapon in the battle between republican left and monarchist right. The conservatives wanted schools controlled by the Catholic Church that would teach obedience and traditionalism. The radicals were anticlerical and afraid of church influence and demanded secular education, with no role for the church and an emphasis on teaching republicanism.

The Loi Guizot of 1833 provided for free education at the parish level. After the Bourbon Restoration, the lycées were called collèges royaux but were renamed lycée in the Second Republic. This was confirmed by the Falloux Laws (text). At this time the lycées included junior classes.

=== Third Republic: 1871–1940 ===
Cemented by anti-clericalism, the desire to secularise the State and social life, faithful to the French Revolution.

The schools became political battlegrounds after the end of the Second Empire. On the left was a coalition determined to weaken Catholicism in France, and especially its political support for royalism and its opposition to republicanism. The battleground was the Church control of most of elementary and secondary education. The coalition included middle class Radicals and working-class Socialists, with the leadership component of Freemasons. On the right the Catholic Church, its devout adherence, and royalists.

The radicals passed the Jules Ferry laws, which established first free education (1881) then mandatory and secular education (1882). Proposed by the Republican Minister of Public Instruction Jules Ferry, they were a crucial step in the secularization of the Third Republic (1871–1940). Republicans feared that since religious orders, especially the Jesuits and Assumptionists, controlled the schools they must be teaching royalist ideas that students should not be allowed to hear. The assumption was that schoolteachers control the ideas and values of the students, as opposed to the parents and the community. They promoted a battle for prestige between the village school teacher and the village priest.

The main attack came early in the 20th century, when the coalition secured a strong majority in parliament in a series of elections. Their main target of attack was the religious orders, most famously the Assumptionists (who controlled a powerful newspaper) and the old Jesuit enemy, but many others as well, who operated Catholic schools across France. In 1902 Émile Combes became Minister of the Interior, and the main energy of the government was devoted to an anti-clerical agenda. The parties of the Left, Socialists and Radicals, united upon this question in the Bloc republicain, supported Combes in his application of the law of 1901 on the religious associations, and voted the new bill on the congregations (1904). Under his guidance parliament moved toward the 1905 French law on the Separation of the Churches and the State, which ended the Napoleonic arrangement of 1801. New laws required all religious associations to be approved by the government. It closed down nearly all of the Catholic orders, and seized 500 million francs worth of endowments, lands and buildings. The expectation of a windfall for the public treasury was mistaken, as the revenues disappeared in a cloud of corruption. By 1904, through his efforts, nearly 10,000 religious schools had been closed and thousands of priests and nuns left France rather than be persecuted.

The final stroke came in 1905, with the complete separation of church and state. The national government no longer paid salaries to bishops priests and nuns. The government nominally took control of Catholic churches, cemeteries, and schools, but in practice, they allowed local congregations to continue using them. France's bishops tried to work a compromise with the government, but Pope Pius X adamantly refused, seeking Christ-like redemption through the crucifixion of Catholicism in France.

== Higher education ==
France lagged well behind Germany in technological education but was on par with Britain and the United States. During the 19th century, a number of higher education grandes écoles were established to support industry and commerce, including Ecole Supérieure de Commerce de Paris (today ESCP Europe, founded in 1819), École Centrale des Arts et Manufactures (École centrale de Paris) in 1829, École des arts industriels et des mines (École centrale de Lille) in 1854 and École centrale lyonnaise pour l'Industrie et le Commerce (École centrale de Lyon) in 1857.

During the latter part of the 19th centuries, new grandes écoles were established so as to further develop education in new fields of sciences and technologies, including HEC School of Management (HEC Paris), École nationale supérieure des télécommunications (TELECOM ParisTech), the École supérieure d'électricité (Supélec).

== 20th century ==
A decree of 1959 established "classical, modern and technical lycees". In 1963, the junior classes were absorbed into primary schools. In 1977 lycées d'enseignement professionnel (vocational schools) were established. They were renamed lycée professionnel in 1985.

In 1985, the education minister, Jean-Pierre Chevènement, announced a target of "80% of an age group to reach baccalauréat level". This aim was taken up by his successor, René Monory and informed an act of parliament in 1989 proposed by Lionel Jospin. In the next decade lycées and higher education grew rapidly. The baccalauréat professionnel was created in 1987. It allowed the holder of a Brevet d'études professionnelles or a Certificat d'aptitude professionnelle to complete their secondary education and perhaps be able to undertake higher study. Between 1987 and 1995, the number of baccalaureate holders rose from 300,000 to 500,000.

Until 1994, the streams in the lycée were called A (literature, philosophy and languages), B (economics and society), C (mathematics), D (biology), E (mathematics and technology), F1, F2, F3, F4,... F12 (technology), G1, G2, G3 (administration, secretarial work, business studies, accounting) and H (hospitality). These streams were then regrouped as the three routes: general, technological and vocational.

== See also ==
- Education in France
- Falloux Act (1850)
- Secular education
- Nursery schools of France
- Freemasonry in the French Third Republic
