= Nérée Boubée =

French scientist (1806–1862)

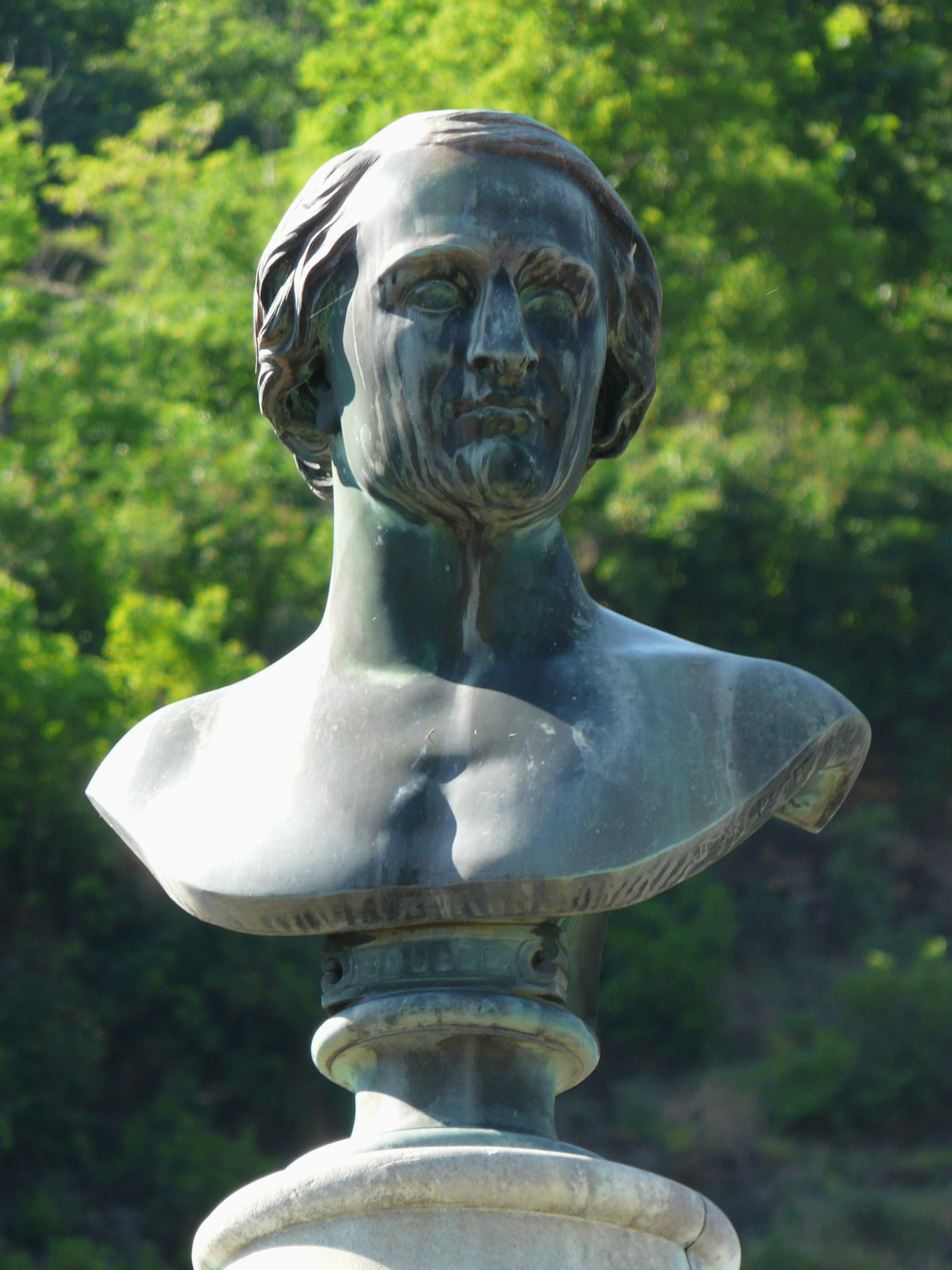
- Bust of Nérée Boubée in the cemetery of Bagnères-de-Luchon.
- Born: 12 May 1806; Toulouse, France
- Died: August 2, 1862 (aged 56); Bagnères-de-Luchon, France
- Known for: Contributions to natural sciences in the 19th century, entomological and mineralogical collections, publications
- Scientific career
- Fields: Zoology, entomology, geology, crystallography
- Institutions: Faculty of Sciences of Paris

Simon Suzanne Nérée Boubée, known professionally as Nérée Boubée (1806–1862) was a French naturalist, entomologist, geologist, author, and educator at the University of Paris, and a member of the Société entomologique de France.

== Biography ==
Simon Suzanne Nérée Boubée was born on 12 May 1806, in Toulouse, France, to parents Joseph Boubée, a magistrate, and Marie-Rose Bonin, residing at Place de la Daurade.

In 1845, he founded a naturalia business (entomological collections, minerals, fossils, plants, scientific materials) which closed in 2014, as well as a publishing house, which also closed in 2014.

Boubée spent most of his life observing and scientifically analyzing nature. He made contributions to various fields, including geology, the study of plant and animal fossils, and crystallography.

He also designed a microscope named after him.

He amassed numerous collections, especially in entomology and minerals. Much of his mineral collection is now part of the mineralogy collection at the Sorbonne, while the rest of his original collections were dispersed in Bagnères-de-Luchon and among American enthusiasts. He also authored several reference works, documenting his research and findings.

In 1831, he explored the famous Lac d'Oô, and later established the Saint-Nérée Chalets Baths, which still exist in the Barousse Valley.

He died on 2 August 1862, in Bagnères-de-Luchon.

== Works ==
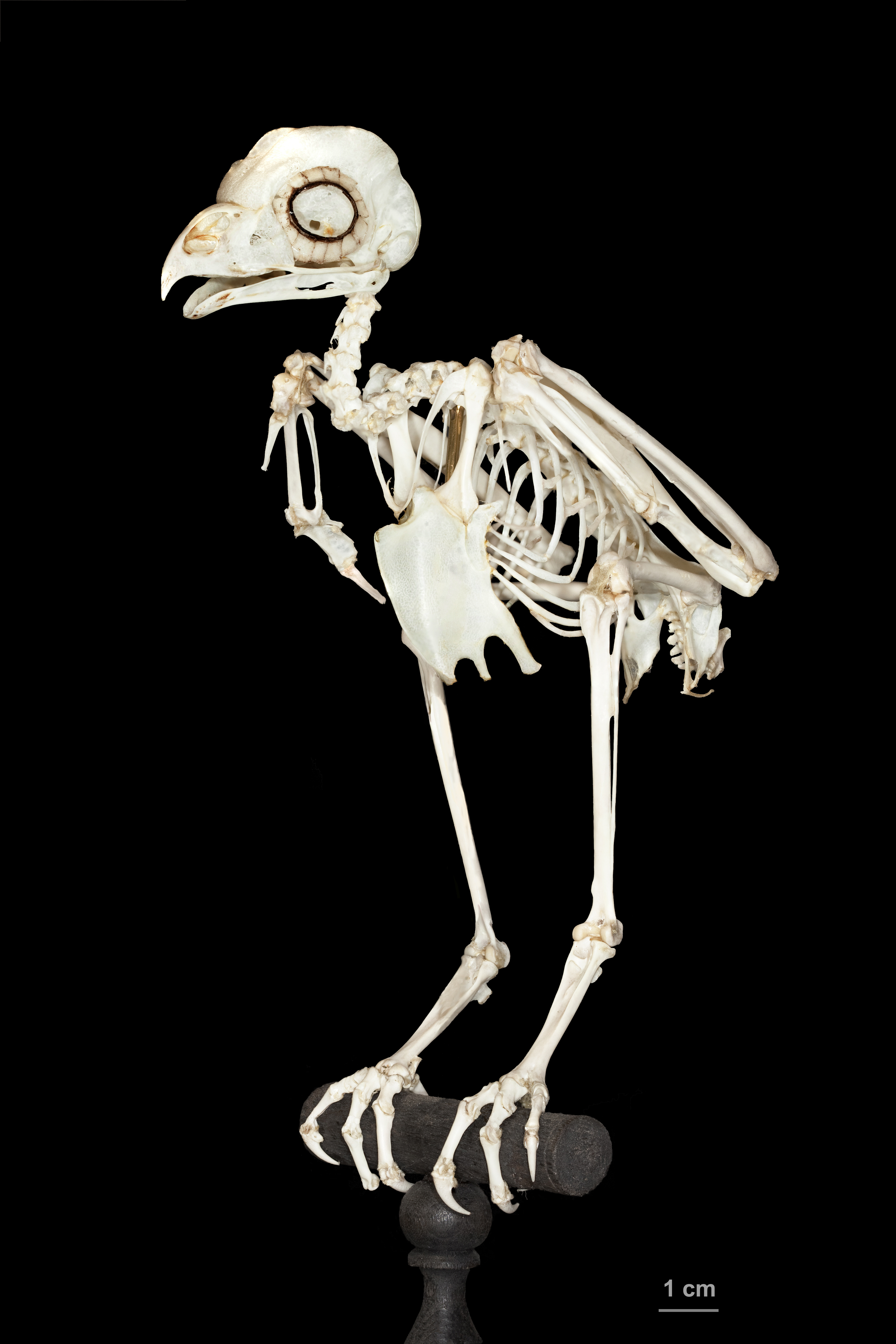
Example of work by N. Boubée – Skeleton of Strigidae – Muséum de Toulouse.

- 1831: Promenade from Bagnères to Lake Oô, a study of the Larboust Valley.
- 1831: Complete Course of Geological Studies by Lessons and Travels, originally planned to consist of 26 parts, but appears to have been unfinished.
- 1832: Physical and Geological Experiments at Lake Oô, including the naturalist's itinerary from Bagnères-de-Luchon to the lake.
- 1833: Géologie élémentaire appliquée à l'agriculture et à l'industrie
- 1833: Two Walks to Mont Dore. For the Study of the Uplift Crater Theory.
- 1843: Baths and Courses of Luchon, True Guide for Trips and Walks.
- 1848: The Only Way to Get Out of It, response to the challenge of Mr. Thiers.
- 1852: Theoretical and Practical Agricultural Geology Course.
- 1856: Mandatory Souvenir of Luchon, the most important things to see in Luchon and its surroundings with the museum booklet.
