= Nursery schools of France =

French early education

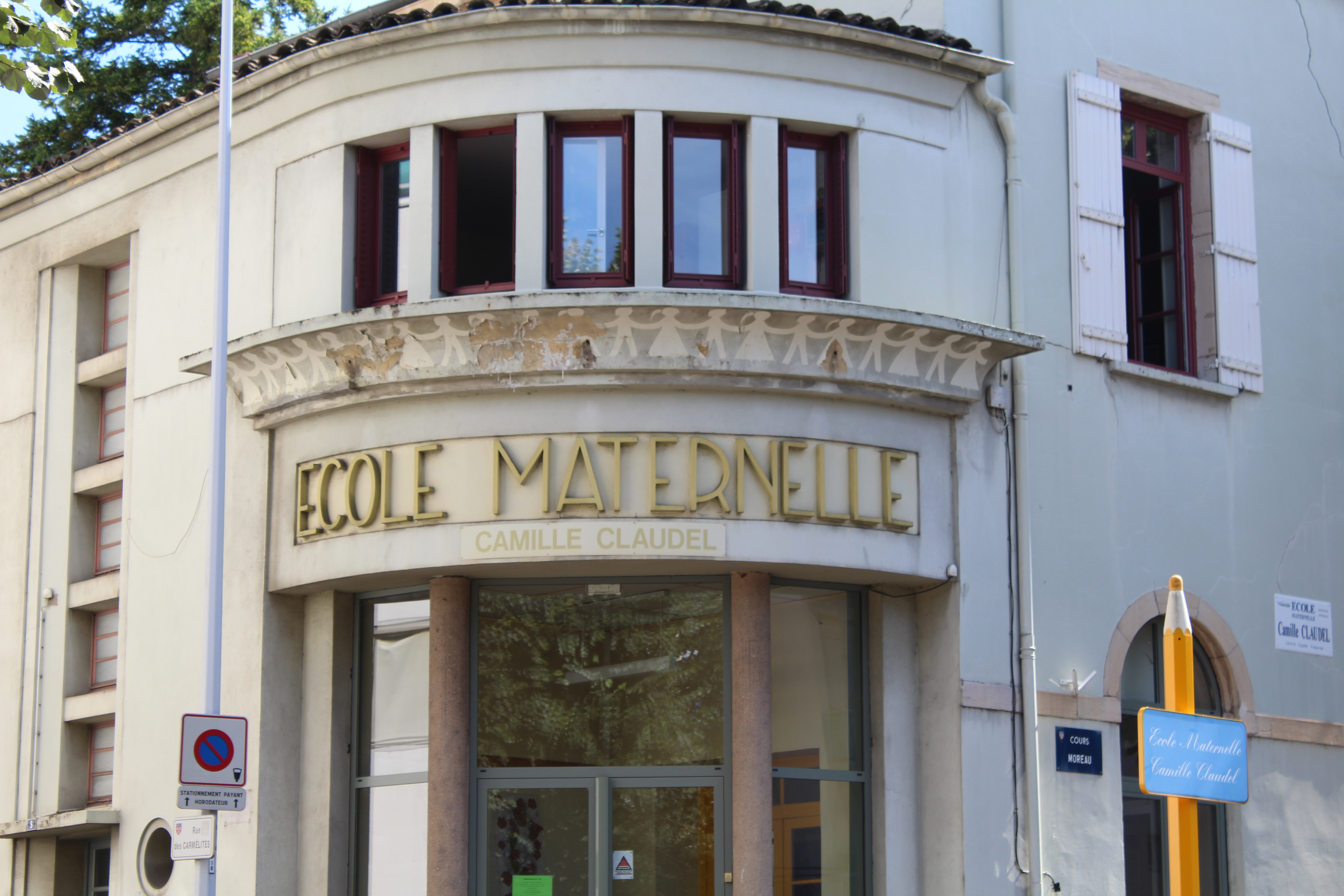
An école maternelle in the Burgundy region

The école maternelle is an integral part of the broader French educational system. It precedes the elementary school and is fully integrated with it — its students feed directly into the elementary school programme. In 2014, it educated 11.8% of two-year-old children and almost all three- to five-year-old children. Nursery school was optional until the start of the 2019 school year, but is now compulsory from the age of three.

There are currently 14,283 public nursery schools in France, as well as 135 private establishments. The nursery school cycle is an important element of the French education system and aims to ensure the awakening and socialisation of young children.

== History ==
=== 18th century origins ===
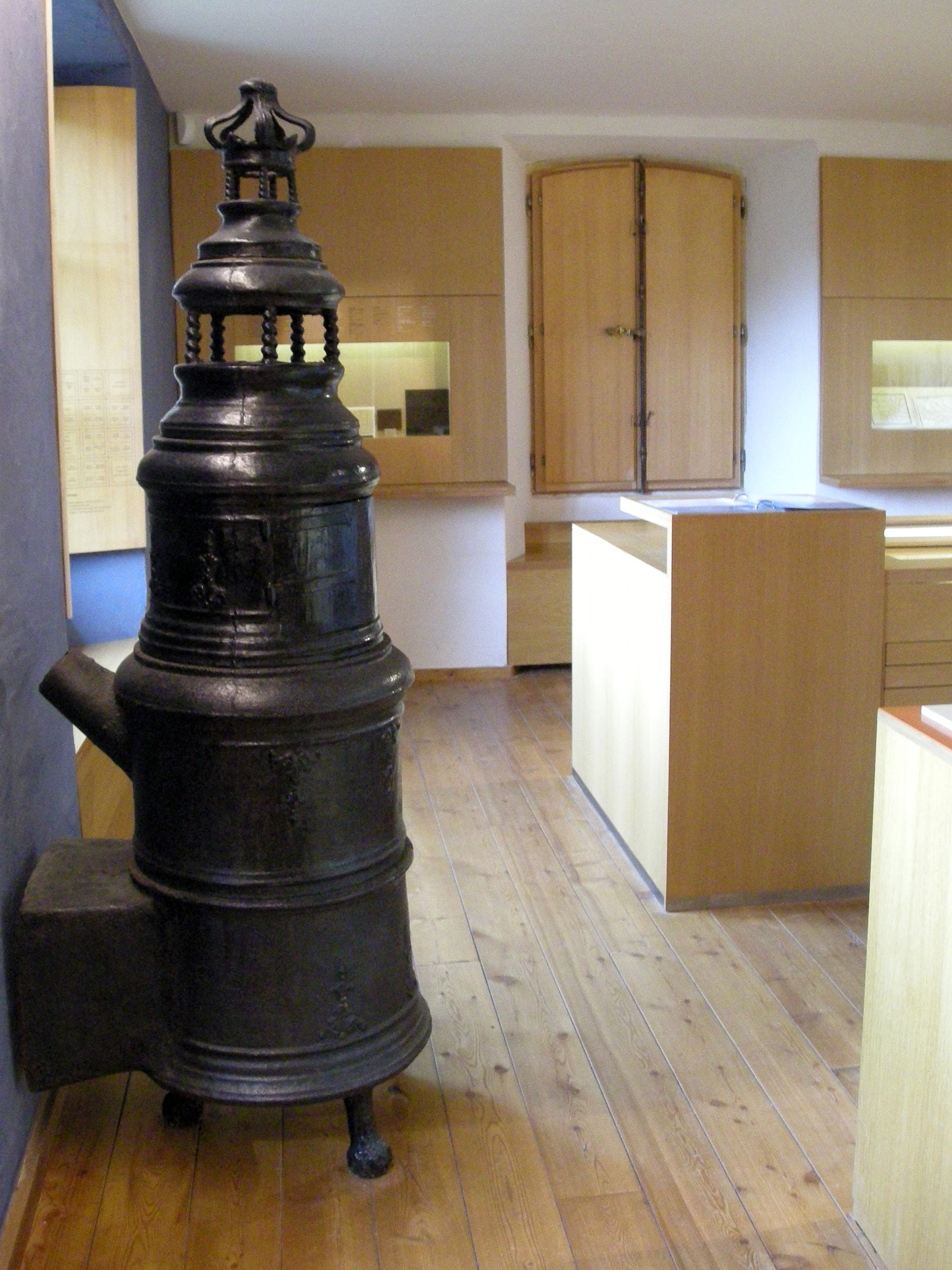
Sara Banzet's wood burning stove, near which children learned to knit

Before the development of more formal institutions of early childhood care, there were only haphazard shelters for young children. They functioned as a babysitting services and had no educational mission. For poorer families, young children who could not work in the fields or elsewhere were often simply left on their own while their parents worked. Centres for caring for such children opened at the end of the 18th century, including with the so-called “knitting schools” in Alsace.

The first knitting school started in the spring of 1767, when Sara Banzet, a young woman from the Alsatian mountain town of Belmont, gathered very young children in her house and gave them an education adapted to their age. The older children learned to knit next to her wood burning stove. This school is credited in France as being the first ancestor of today's école maternelle. Jean-Frédéric Oberlin, a Protestant pastor and philanthropist, having observed Sara Banzet's school, hired other women to duplicate the knitting school model elsewhere in Alsace.

Schools such as these developed at the beginning of the 19th century in parallel with the industrial revolution. The schools’ vocation was mainly social protection: they offered a secure place to the children of workers in order to protect them from the dangers of the street. For that reason, the precursors of the nursery school in France were called “rooms of asylum” or “rooms of hospitality”.

=== Early 19th century developments ===
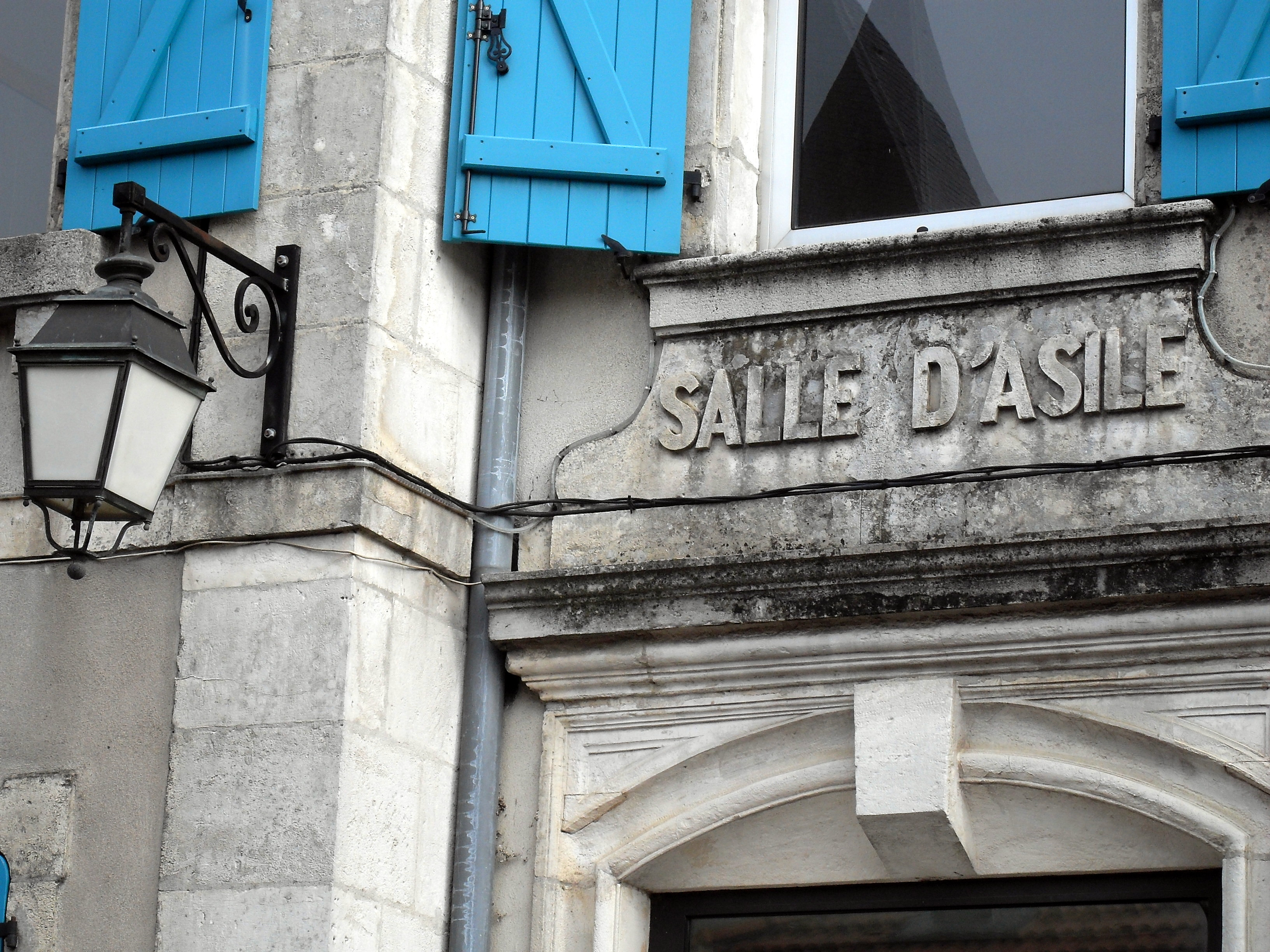
A building still marked as housing a 'room of asylum' (salle d'asile) in northeastern France

The idea that children of the working class needed protection carried into the 19th century, but with an influx of new ideas. The creation of “rooms of asylum” in France was influenced by developments in Scotland and England. In 1810, the Welsh philanthropist, Robert Owen, founded a school for small children in his cotton mills at New Lanark, Scotland. He entrusted the direction of the school to a simple weaver, James Buchanan, a man without education, but possessing remarkable aptitudes for education. Buchanan's successes in the New Lanark school attracted notice: in 1819 he was called to London by Henri Brougham and tasked with organising infant schools in the capital. He succeeded at this new task and created a whole set of processes forming a method of education and teaching.

In 1825, accounts describing with admiration the English infant schools began to circulate in Parisian salons. Mme de Pastoret - a wealthy philanthropist who had already started a kind of crèche for the care of very young, working class children in Paris - heard these accounts and resolved to put these ideas into practice in France. She then formed a Women's Committee, which obtained a subsidy of 3000 francs and a concession of premises. An asylum receiving 80 children was opened in April 1826.

It was at this time that Jean-Denis Cochin, mayor of the second arrondissement of Paris, who was devoted to the cause of protecting and developing children, contacted the Women's Committee. He feared a setback for Mme de Pastoret's work (she had earlier created a crèche that had to be closed because it had insufficient personnel to take care of the number of children it enrolled).

A further closure might have compromised their project of providing early childhood care and education. He shared his apprehensions with the Women's Committee and persuaded a colleague, Mme Millet, to go and study Buchanan's infant schools in London. Wanting to learn Buchanan's method himself, Cochin also went to London. After a year of study, he returned to France with a translation of Buchanan's manuals, which he published in 1833. He, Mme Millet and Mme de Pastoret then created various schools modeled on the London schools. In 1833, despite these efforts, asylum rooms were still extremely rare and few cities had them (9 in Paris and Strasbourg, 4 in Lyon, 1 in Chartres).

=== New laws in the 19th century ===
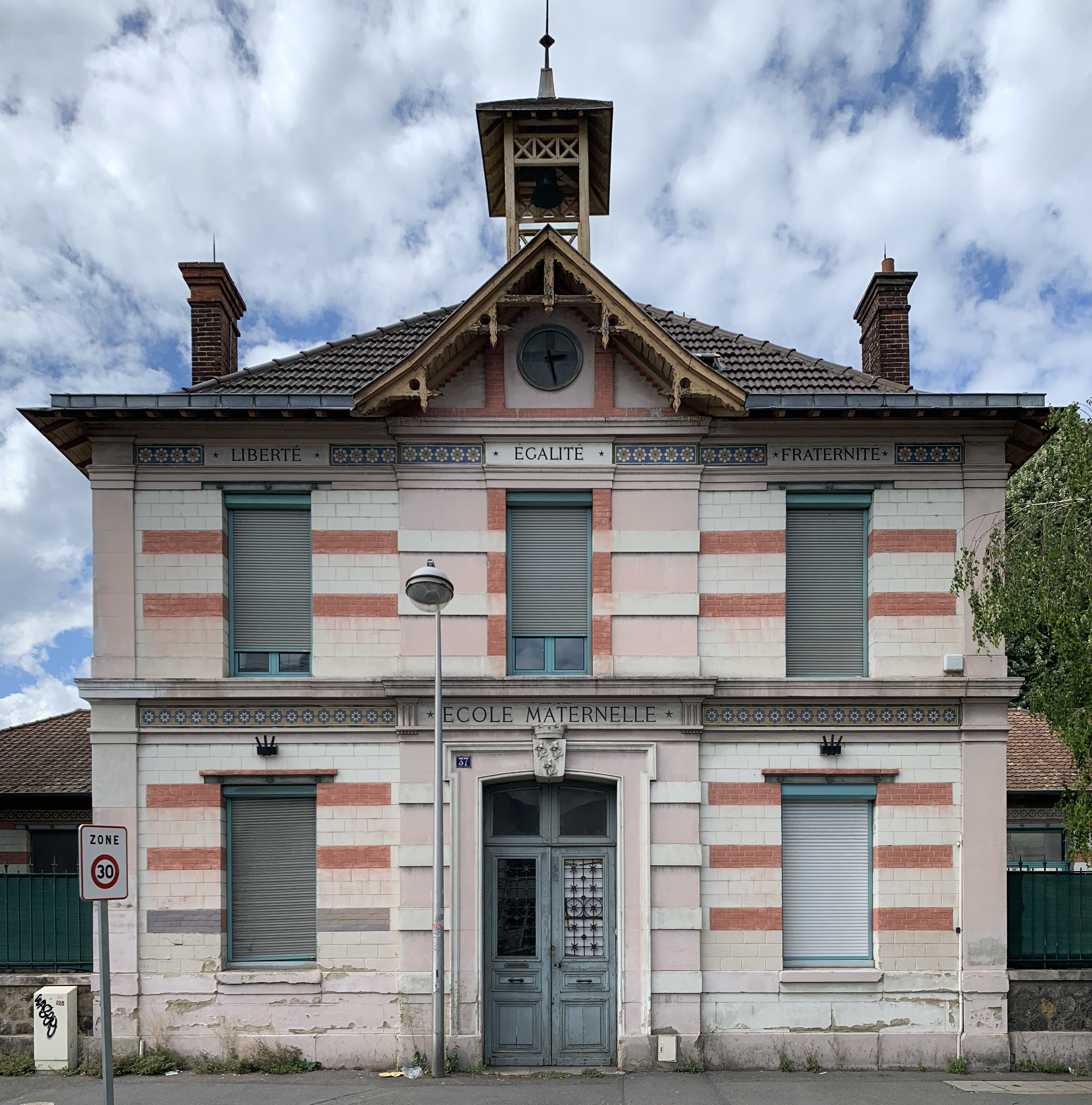
An école maternelle in a southeastern suburb of Paris

During this same year, the Guizot law required each municipality with more than 500 inhabitants to open a primary school for boys and, though schooling was not free, the communes were required to make free education available to poor students. This was the first step in the creation of a universal system of public education.

The Falloux law of 1850 took a further step toward universal education by requiring towns with more than 800 inhabitants to create schools for girls. The law, whose main thrust was to promote the role of Catholic education, devoted just three short articles to the écoles maternelles. It sought to provide a certain amount of freedom to private asylum rooms, while also organising state control over them and integrating them into the broader mixed public-private school system.

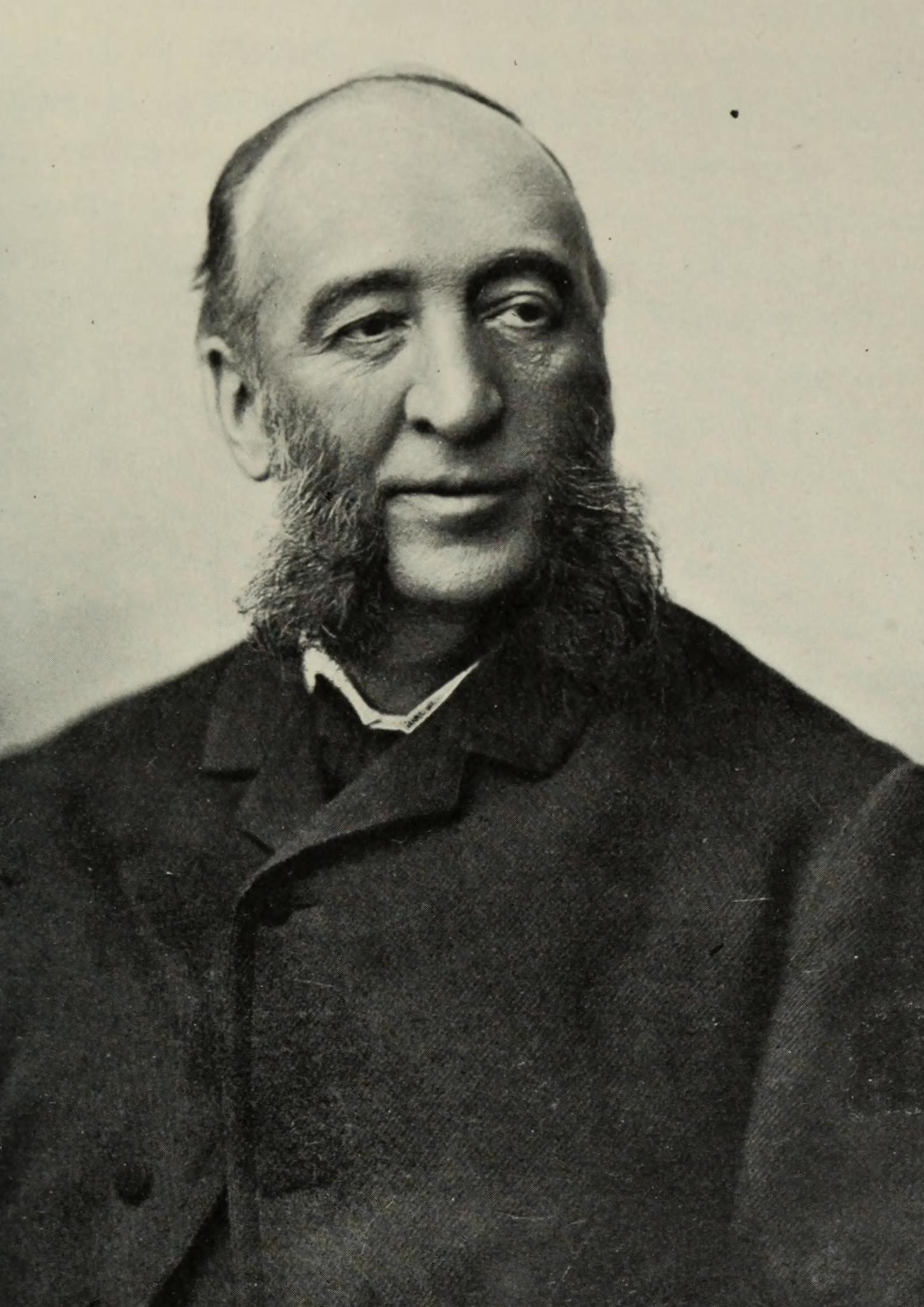
Jules Ferry, Prime Minister and a key architect of the French education system, including the écoles maternelles

The year 1881 marked many changes to primary education in France. In 1881, the asylum rooms were replaced by the first nursery schools and the staff was replaced by teachers trained specifically for teaching in elementary schools. The seminal laws of 16 June 1881 and 28 March 1882, made primary education in France free, non-clerical (laïque). Education was made compulsory for children aged six to thirteen. These laws were the cornerstone of Prime Minister Jules Ferry's political career and the accomplishment for which he is still remembered today. The écoles maternelles were non-compulsory, but were provided as a free public service and fully integrated with elementary school education. A decree of August 2, 1881 established the primary mission of nursery schools as one of providing young children with the possibility of obtaining the care necessary for their physical, moral and intellectual development.

During the French Third Republic, nursery schools were under the supervision of Pauline Kergomard, the system's first general inspector from 1881 until 1917. Her emphasis was on promoting the natural development of the child and the full integration of the écoles maternelles into the broader school system. Specifically, her somewhat avant-garde objectives were: Show respect for young children; do not overemphasise academic exercises; encourage play as a natural form of child activity; deepen child psychology; and adapt the buildings and furniture to the needs of young children. She also worked on the coordination of the écoles maternelles with the elementary school programme.

=== Post-World War II developments ===
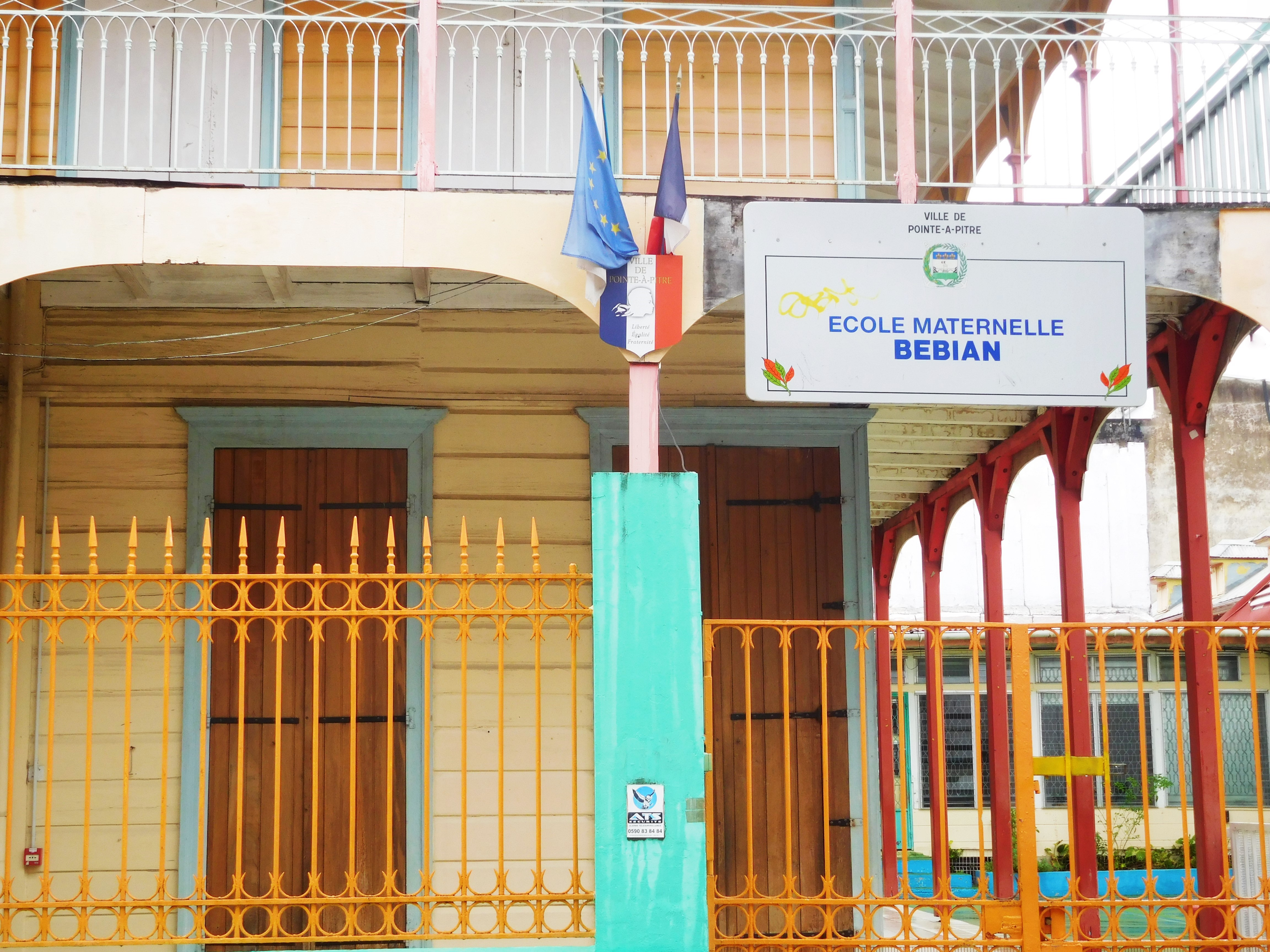
An école maternelle in Guadeloupe, France

Nursery schools changed little during the first few decades of the 20th century. It was after World War II that their positioning shifted away from social protection of disadvantaged children to early childhood education for families of all social classes. At the end of the 1950s, child mortality had already fallen considerably and the birth rate was experiencing a marked recovery. In addition, the development of the service sector led to a boom in female employment which created a need for childcare services.

During the 1960s and 1970s, education and child development became concerns that families of all social classes shared to varying degrees. In addition, the popularisation of child psychology introduced new perspectives on child development to non-specialists and highlighted the importance of the environment and stimulation in early childhood.

Until the 1950s, attendance at nursery schools was mainly limited to cities and large towns located in industrial France and it remained relatively low. This changed significantly in subsequent decades. While about 40% of children aged 2 to 5 were enrolled in kindergarten in 1950, 70% were enrolled in 1972 and were more evenly distributed across French territory. More recently, almost all children aged three to five are enrolled in school (98.9% at the start of the 2018). This growing recourse by all social classes to the école maternelle system appears to be largely due to changes in lifestyles (e.g. the influence of urbanisation and the growing involvement of women in the labour market). Also, the evolving views of the status of the child reinforced the nursery schools' pedagogical prestige inasmuch as they were seen as educating the child, without being boring.

== Training nursery school teachers ==
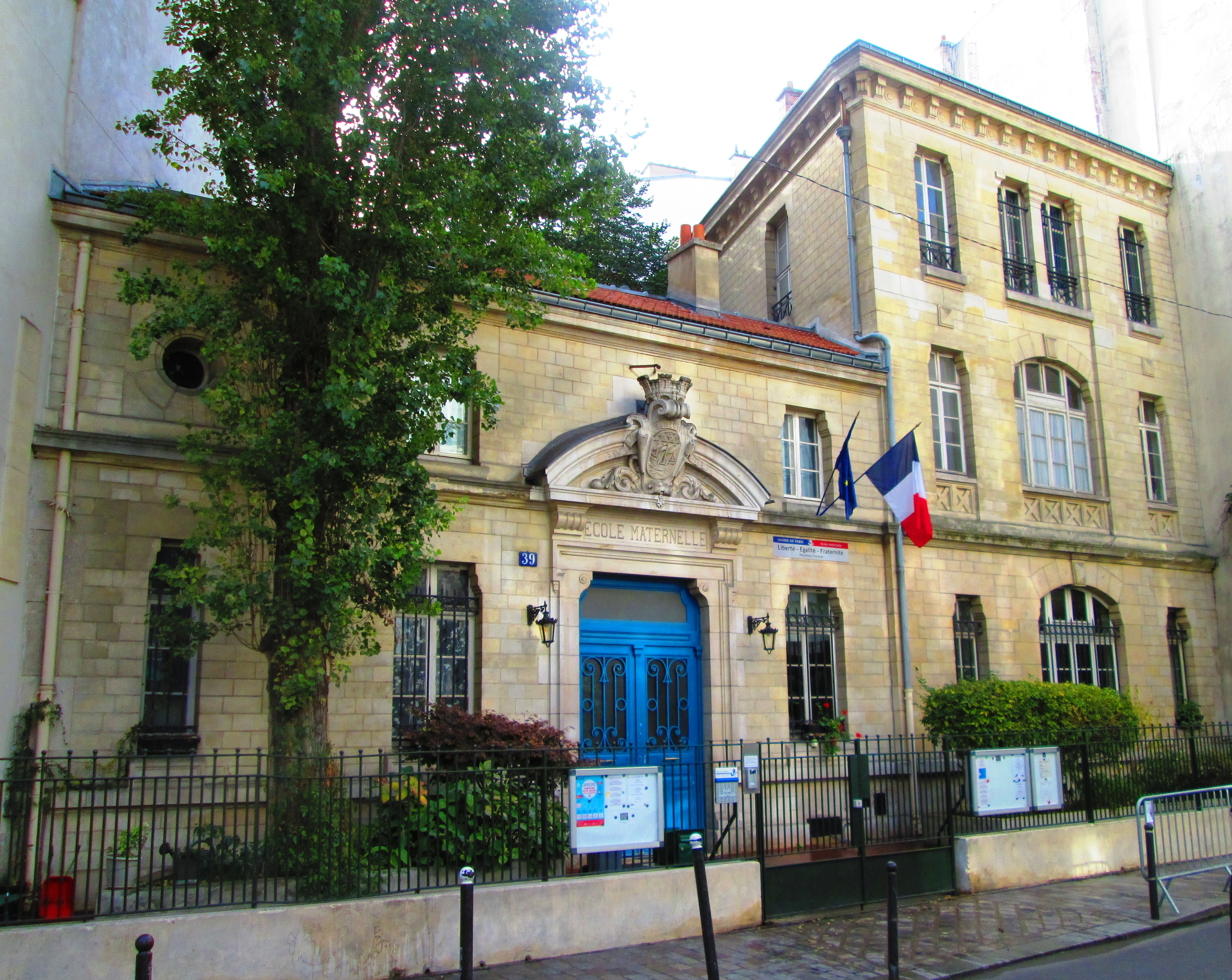
An école maternelle in the sixth arrondissement of Paris

As for the adults (almost exclusively women) responsible for looking after the children in these schools, the dominant tendency over many years was for a professionalisation of their role and for an alignment of their training with that of elementary school teachers.

== The objectives of modern nursery schools ==
In 2022, the weekly duration of lessons in nursery school is 24 hours. According to the French Ministry of National Education, the nursery school programme is organized into five learning areas that seek to help children in:

- Mobilizing language in all its dimensions
- Acting, expressing oneself and understanding through physical activity
- Acting, expressing oneself and understanding through artistic activities
- Building the first tools to structure the child's thinking
- Exploring the world.

== Nursery school becomes obligatory from the age of three ==
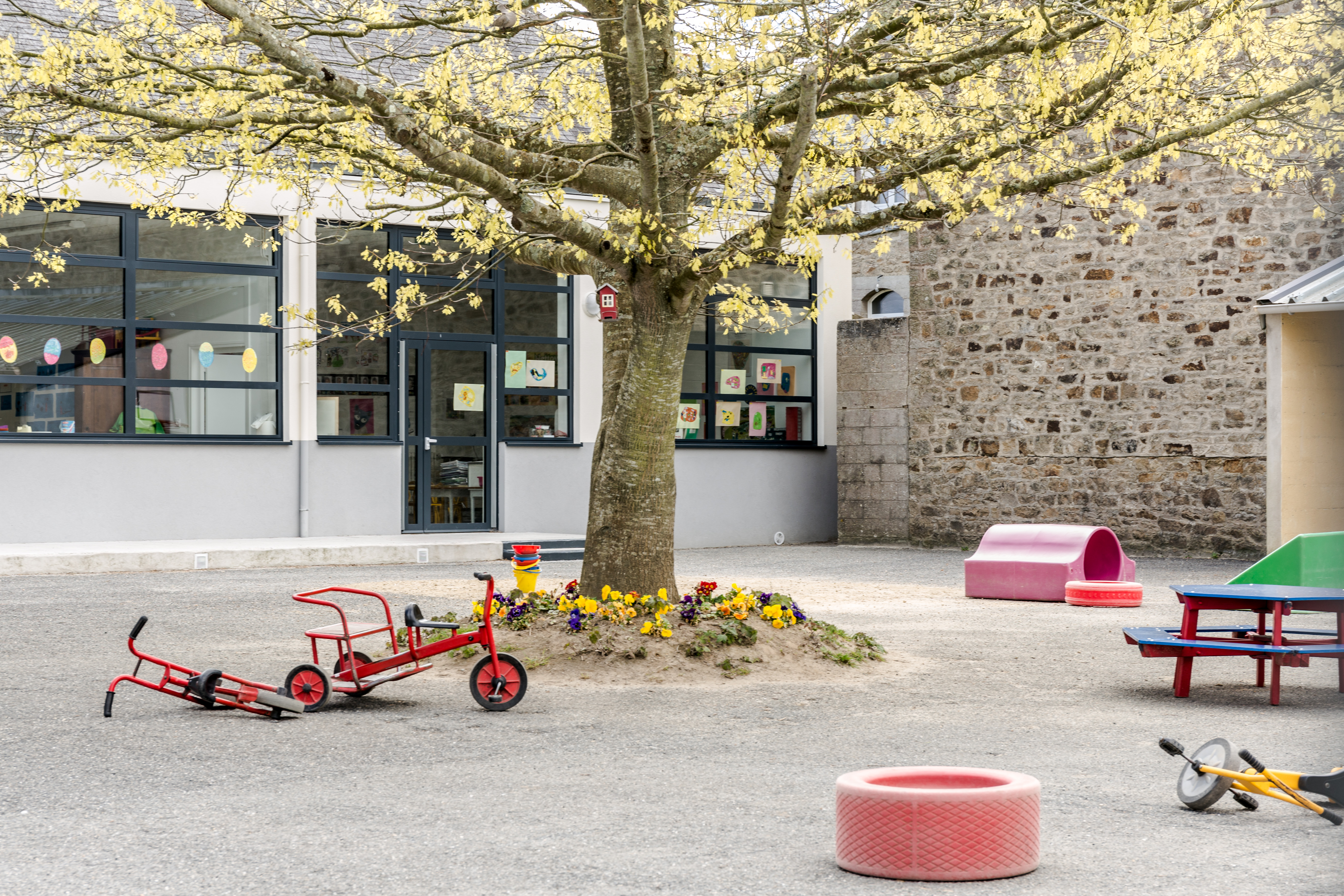
Courtyard of an école maternelle in Brittany

Nursery schools in France traditionally offer three classes corresponding to three age groups: the small section (PS), the middle section (MS) and the large section (GS), and sometimes also has a very small section (TPS) for children under three years old.

Before the start of the school year in 2019, attendance at nursery school was not mandatory — education of children was only compulsory from the year in which the child celebrated his sixth birthday. The law promulgated on July 28, 2019, lowered the age of compulsory schooling for children to the year in which they have their third birthday. Nursery school is open to all children residing in France, regardless of their nationality.

== See also ==
- Education in France
- History of education in France
- Preschool
- Early childhood education
