= Frédéric Alfred Pierre, comte de Falloux =

French politician and author (1811–1886)

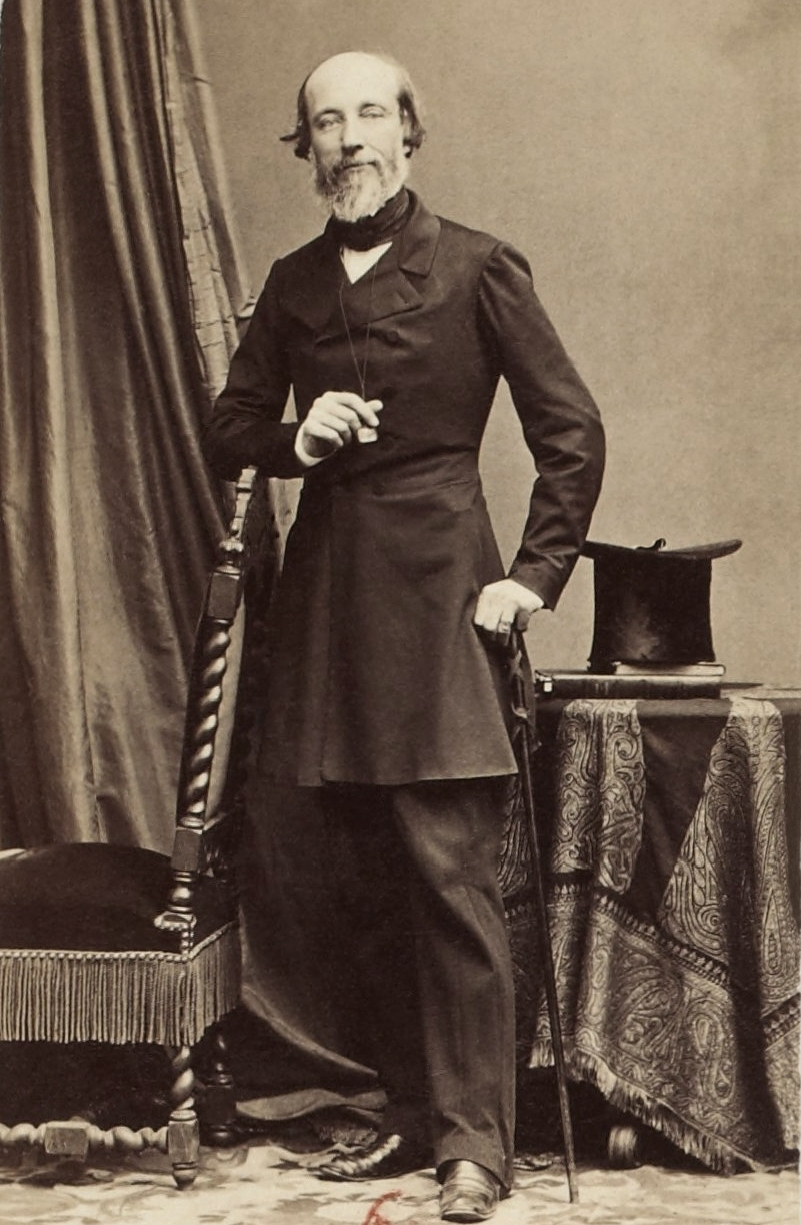
Alfred de Falloux, c. 1860

Frédéric-Alfred-Pierre, comte de Falloux (7 May 1811 – 6 January 1886) was a French politician and author, famous for having given his name to two laws on education, favoring private Catholic teaching. He was the younger brother of Cardinal Frédéric de Falloux (1807–1884)

== Biography ==
Falloux was born at Angers, Maine-et-Loire, to Comte Guillaume de Falloux (1774–1850) and his wife, Félicité de Fitte de Soucy (1784–1850). His maternal grandmother was Renée Suzanne de Fitte de Soucy, Governess to the children of Louis XVI and Marie Antoinette. His father had been ennobled by King Charles X of France, and Falloux began his career as a Legitimist and clerical journalist under the influence of Madame Swetchine. In 1846 he entered the legislature as deputy for the Maine-et-Loire, and with many other Catholics he gave real or pretended support to the revolution of 1848. Louis Napoleon made him minister of public instruction and worship in December 1848, but having fallen sick in September 1849, he was replaced in October.

He had nevertheless secured the passage of the Loi Falloux (15 March 1850) for the organization of primary and secondary education. This law provided that the clergy and members of ecclesiastical orders, male and female, might exercise the profession of teaching without producing any further qualification. This exemption was extended even to priests who taught in secondary schools, where a university degree was exacted from lay teachers. The primary schools were put under the management of the curés. Falloux was elected to the Académie française in 1856.

His failure to secure re-election to the legislature in 1866, 1869, 1870 and 1871 was due to the opposition of the stricter Legitimists, who viewed with suspicion his attempts to reconcile the Orléans princes with Henri, comte de Chambord. In spite of his failure to enter the National Assembly his influence was great, and was increased by his personal friendship with Adolphe Thiers. Nevertheless, in 1872 he offended both sections of the monarchical party at a conference arranged in the hope of effecting a fusion between the partisans of the comte de Chambord and of the Orléans princes, divided on the vexed question of the flag. He suggested that the comte de Chambord might recede from his position with dignity at the desire of the National Assembly, and not content with this encroachment on royalist principles, he insinuated the possibility of a transitional stage with the duc d'Aumale as president of the republic. His disgrace was so complete that he was excommunicated by the Bishop of Angers in 1876.

Of his numerous works the best known are his Histoire de Louis XVI (1840); Histoire de Saint Pie V (1845); De la contre-révolution (1876); and the posthumous Mémoires d'un royaliste (2 volumes, 1888).
