= Falloux Laws =

19th century French laws promoting Catholic education

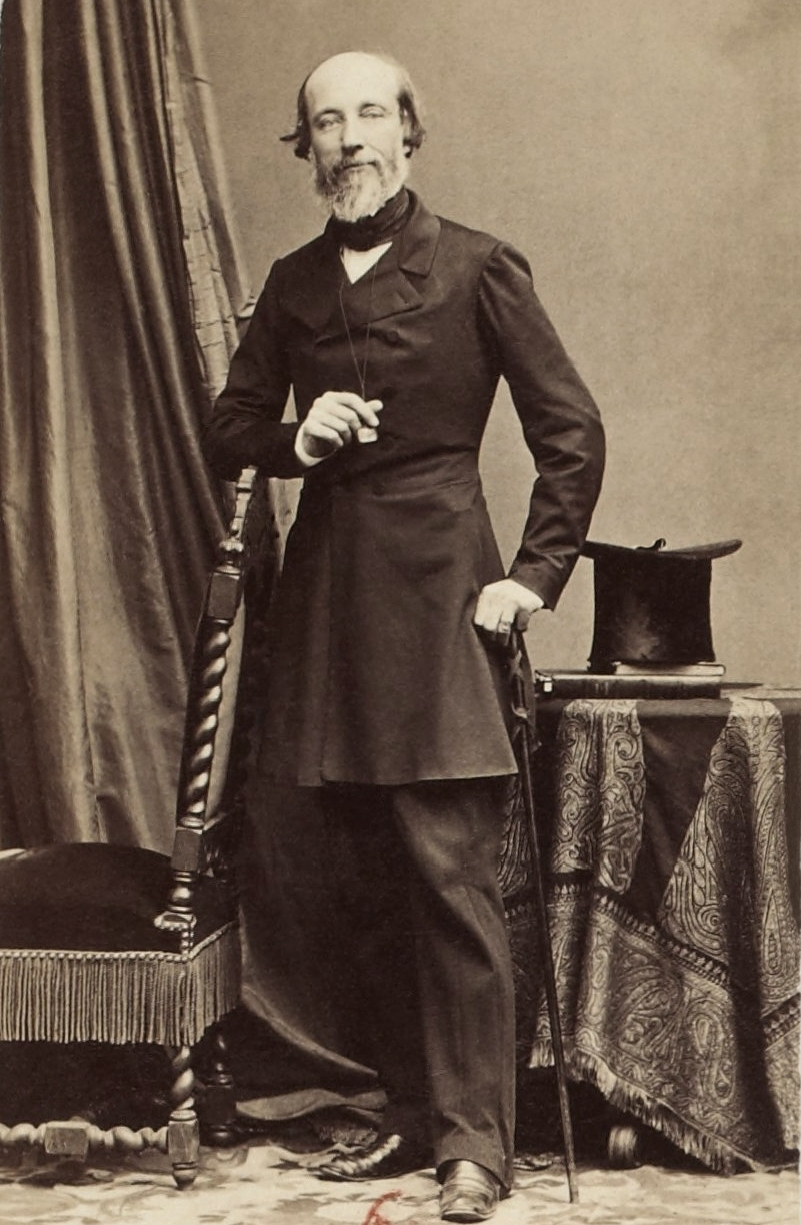
Alfred de Falloux, ca.1860

The Falloux Laws promoted Catholic schools in France in the 1850s, 1860s and 1870s. They were voted in during the French Second Republic and promulgated on 15 March 1850 and in 1851, following the presidential election of Louis-Napoléon Bonaparte as president in December 1848 and the May 1849 legislative elections that gave a majority to the conservative Parti de l'Ordre. Named for the Minister of Education Alfred de Falloux, they mainly aimed at promoting Catholic teaching. The Falloux Law of 15 March 1850 also extended the requirements of the Guizot Law of 1833, which had mandated a boys' school in each commune of more than 500 inhabitants, to require a girls' school in those communes. The 1851 law created a mixed system, in which some primary education establishments were public and controlled by the state and others were under the supervision of Catholic congregations.

The new law created an association between Church and state that lasted until the anti-clerical Jules Ferry laws in the early 1880s established free and secular education in the Third Republic. The Falloux laws provided universal primary schooling in France and expanded opportunities for secondary schooling. In practice, the curricula in Catholic and state schools were similar. Catholic schools were especially useful in schooling for girls, which had long been neglected.

== Main features ==
The main objectives of the Falloux Laws was to replace the revolutionary and imperial system, which had placed the whole of the education system under the supervision of the University and of state-trained teachers, who were accused of spreading Republicans and anti-clerical ideas, by a system giving responsibility for education back to the clergy. This aim was largely achieved: the Falloux Law created a mixed system, public (and mostly secular) on one hand, and private and Catholic on the other.

This law allowed the clergy and members of ecclesiastical orders, male and female, to teach without any further qualifications. This exemption was extended even to priests who taught in secondary schools, where a university degree was demanded from lay teachers. The primary schools were put under the management of the curés.

The Falloux Law created one academy for each department, decentralising the University and thus strengthening the notables' local influence. It reorganised the Superior Council of Education and academic councils, specifically by giving a large number of places to representatives of various religions, above all of Roman Catholicism. Eight University members had seats at the Superior Council of Public Instruction, alongside seven religious representatives (including four Catholics), three state counsellors, three members of the Institute, and three members representing "free" (i.e. private) teaching establishments. Similarly, bishops were included in the academic councils.

Primary and secondary education were divided between state establishments, and private establishments, headed by non-profit organisations or religious congregations. Supervision of schools was the joint responsibility of the mayor and the priest. The law more strictly regulated teacher training colleges (écoles normales) and teachers were provided with a guaranteed minimum wage. Any town could transfer its public collège to the Catholic system. All schools were inspected by government officials and the state alone had the right to award the baccalauréat. The law worked as intended to increase the Catholic role. The growth in Catholic schools 1854 to 1867 was 75 percent, as opposed to 34 percent for the secondary school system as a whole.

== Historical and political background ==
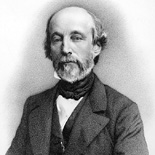
Alfred de Falloux.

The Falloux Law was promulgated in a context in which French Catholics were worried about the increasing role of the state in education since the Revolution of 1789 and the reorganisation of the imperial University. They thought that the imperial education system, inherited from the First Empire's reforms, excessively diffused Enlightenment, republican and socialist ideas. Thus, they wanted the education system to return to its basis during the Ancien Régime.

The Bourbon Restoration had in part satisfied these wants, by tolerating teaching by religious congregations, although it still theoretically remained prohibited, and had also granted more weight to bishops in the education system, enabling schooling programs to give more attention to Catholicism.

However, the July Monarchy was much less friendly to this reactionary trend. Although the Guizot Law of 1833 partially satisfied Catholics by authorising private teaching in primary education, it kept secondary and higher education under the University's supervision. Guizot also generalised the écoles normales primaires, which were responsible for the training of teachers. First created by the National Convention in 1794, these schools, related to the écoles normales supérieures, were organised on the basis of the 1808 decree organising the University of France, and were accused by conservatives of promoting Republicanism, Socialism and anti-clericalism.

== First debates during 1848-1849 ==
After the 1848 Revolution, Lazare Hippolyte Carnot was named Minister of Public Instruction and prepared a draft reform. He named the Republican Jules Barthélemy-Saint-Hilaire president of the parliamentary commission which would write the draft. The latter would have made education mandatory for children of both sexes, as well as a three years of training for teachers, subsidised by the state. Although it favoured public schools, it still allowed private teaching establishments. Carnot's draft was however set aside after his resignation on 5 July 1848.

Thus, parliamentary debates were resumed. The newly elected President Louis Napoléon Bonaparte replaced Carnot with Alfred de Falloux as Minister of Public Instruction in December 1848, the latter remaining in Odilon Barrot's government until May 1849. The decree of 11 December 1848 made the upcoming law on education an organic law, which should thus be reserved to the Constituent Assembly's initiative.

A Legitimist (i.e. a conservative Royalist), Falloux officially withdrew Carnot's draft bill on 4 January 1849 and dissolved the Scientific and Literary Study Commission named by Carnot. Falloux clearly aimed at restoring Roman Catholicism to the forefront of French schooling and society, describing his program in his Memoirs: "God in education. The Pope at the head of the Church. The Church at the head of civilisation."

Having dissolved Carnot's commission, Falloux created two new ministerial commissions, dedicated to preparing the draft laws for primary and secondary education, which quickly merged. Both were composed by a majority of conservative Catholics. Presided by the Minister Falloux himself, it had as vice-president Adolphe Thiers, and included Catholics such as the archbishop of Paris Mgr Sibour, the abbot Dupanloup (who later became bishop of Orléans), etc. Surprisingly, Thiers, formerly a critic of the Church's involvement in education, was one of those who most supported Catholics' influence in the education system, being ready to hand over to the clergy the whole of the primary education establishments, whilst bishop Dupanloup and others strong Catholics calmed his excessive claims.

Upset by this measure, in part because the December 1848 decree had given the initiative for the legislative process, concerning organic laws, to the Assembly, the latter nominated a new parliamentary Commission to re-establish its prerogatives following a proposition by the moderate Republican Pascal Duprat. This parallel Commission was presided by the Minister of Public Instruction de Vaulabelle and had as secretary the Republican Jules Simon.

Parliamentary debates focused on Article 9 of the new Constitution concerning education. Catholic deputy Charles de Montalembert then described the University's monopoly in the education system as "intellectual communism" and claimed the system was "inferior to that of the Ancien Régime". Article 9 proclaimed that "education is free" ("L'enseignement est libre")" while adding that this "freedom of education" was determined by legislation and exercised "under state supervision." While authorising private establishments, this article thus ensured that education in general was placed under the watch of the state. The extent of the latter would be determined by forthcoming laws.

On 5 February 1849, Jules Simon presented to the Assembly the draft law, composed of 23 articles. However, Barrot's government claimed that the Constituent Assembly's mandate was coming to an end and that further proposed laws would have to be examined by the succeeding National Assembly. Pressed for time, the Constituent Assembly thus decided to examine the most pressing laws. The deputy Nérée Boubée, a scientist and university lecturer, proposed that the draft education law be one of those scrutinised, but his motion was rejected by 458 votes against 307.

== New debates following the May 1849 elections ==
Discussion of the new law would thus have to wait the May 1849 legislative election. But these ones gave an absolute majority to the conservative Parti de l'Ordre, mainly composed of Catholic monarchists, whether Orleanists or Legitimists, such as Falloux who was elected deputy.

Despite having been dissolved, the Commission presided by Barthélémy Saint-Hilaire and named by Carnot submitted its draft and report to the Assembly on 10 April 1849. This work was ignored during further discussions. On 18 June 1849, Falloux submitted to the Assembly the draft bill elaborated by the ministerial commission which he had himself named. Falloux thus resumed his plans: "Instruction has remained too much isolated from education; education has remained too much isolated from religion."

The Assembly hereby named another parliamentary commission, where Catholics had again the upper-hand. It included Salomon (from the Meuse), the Protestant theologian Coquerel, Baze, the theologian Armand de Melun (who had been a collaborator of late Denys Affre, former archbishop of Paris), de l'Espinay, Sauvaire-Barthélemy (a grandnephew of the marquis de Barthélémy), Dufougeray, Barthélémy Saint-Hilaire, de Montalembert, Rouher, Thiers, Beugnot, Fresneau, Janvier, Parisis (bishop of Langres). The Commission chose Thiers as president and Beugnot as "rapporteur" (in charge of presenting the draft bill to the Assembly). Falloux also managed to bypass the Conseil d'Etat's examination of the law, the latter being composed of several Republicans.

In September 1849, Falloux fell sick and was replaced in October as Minister of Public Instruction by Félix Esquirou de Parieu. On 11 January 1850, a minor law (named Parieu Law) was passed, simplifying procedures of suspension and revocation of teachers. The draft was discussed again starting on 14 January 1850. During these debates, Victor Hugo, although member of the Parti de l'Ordre, criticised the renewed influence of the clergy. The law was finally adopted on 15 March 1850, by 399 votes against 237.

== Reforms of the Third Republic and afterward ==
The Third Republic abrogated or reformed most dispositions of the Falloux Laws. The 27 February 1880 law reduced the clergy's representation in educational councils. The Jules Ferry Laws established mandatory, free and laic education. The Goblet Law abrogated the first and second section of the Falloux Law. In 1904, among increasing voices to repeal entirely the Falloux Law, the Minister Emile Combes prohibited religious congregations from teaching, including in private schools.

However, Catholics responded by creating "lay private schools", where religious education was maintained, although teaching was done by lay people, and not clergy.

Vichy France allowed religious congregations to teach again and strongly subsided private Catholic schools. Although these subsidies were interrupted following the Liberation, the Provisional Government of the French Republic (GPRF) did not repeal the teaching authorisation given to congregations. The Debré Law of 1959 went further, by having private schools' teachers paid by the state.

Although the Falloux Laws have formally been repealed since the promulgation of the Education Code in 2000, several of their dispositions have been retained in the Code and form the main legislative framework for private schools.

== Additional sources ==
- (in French) Pierre Albertini, L'École en France. XIXe-XXe siècles. De la maternelle à l'université., Carré Histoire, Hachette Supérieur, Paris, 1992.
- (in French) Carlos Mario Molina Betancur, La Loi Falloux : abrogation ou réforme ?, LGDJ, coll. « Bibliothèque constitutionnelle et de science politique », numéro 104, Paris, 2001, 543 p.

== See also ==
- Normal schools in France
