= Lac d'Oô =

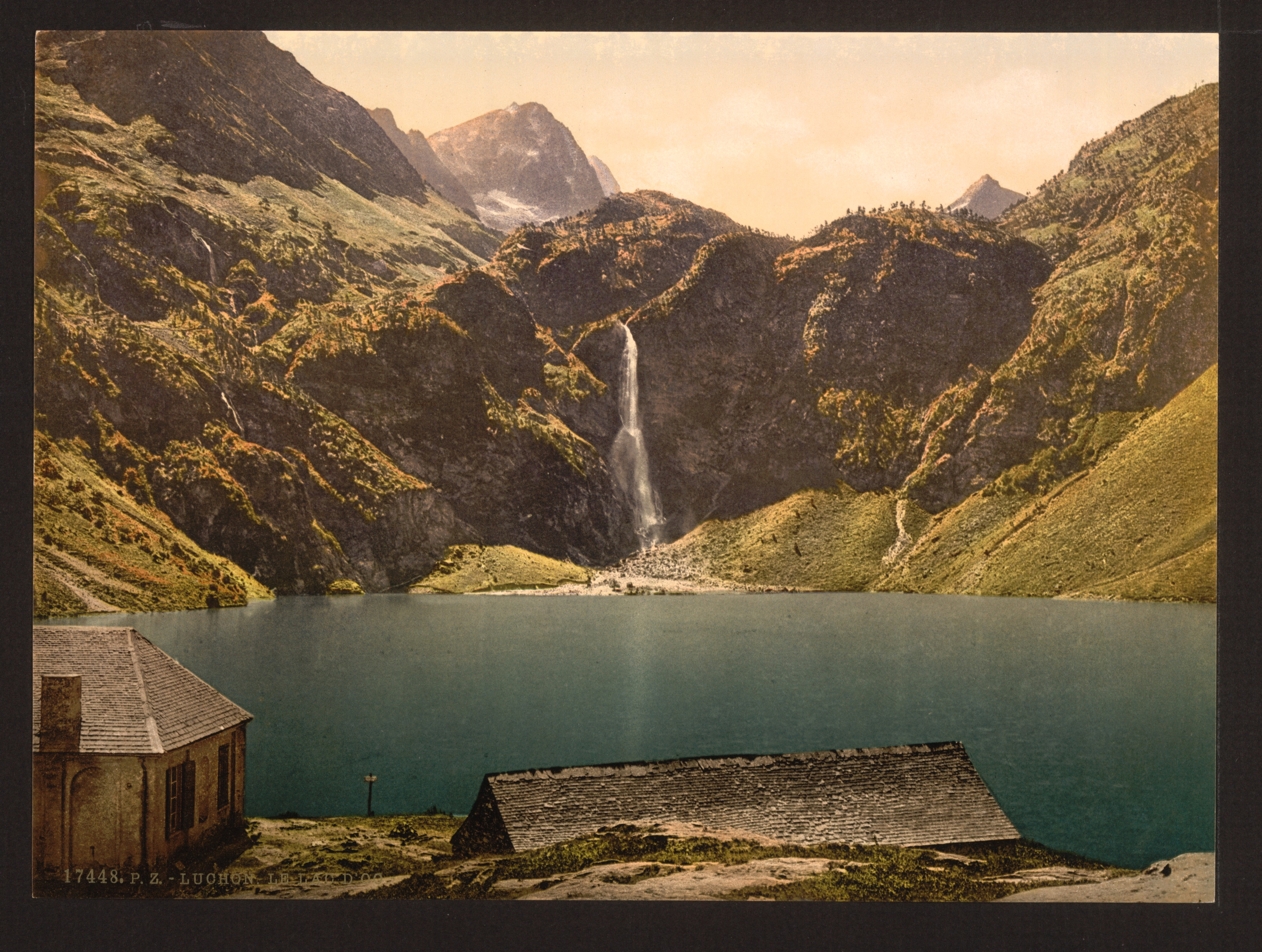

- Location within Haute-Garonne
- Location: Oô, Haute-Garonne, Pyrenees
- Coordinates: 42.740°N 0.492°E
- Type: reservoir
- Basin countries: France
- Surface area: 4.2 ha (10 acres)
- Max. depth: 12 m (39 ft)
- Water volume: 13 hm^{3} (11,000 acre⋅ft)
- Surface elevation: 1,507 m (4,944 ft)

The Lac d'Oô (Occitan: Lac d'Òu) is a glacial lake, artificially expanded through the construction of a dam in 1918-1921, in the French Pyrenees with an area of 4.2 hectares, located at an altitude of 1507 m in the commune of Oô.

== Gallery ==
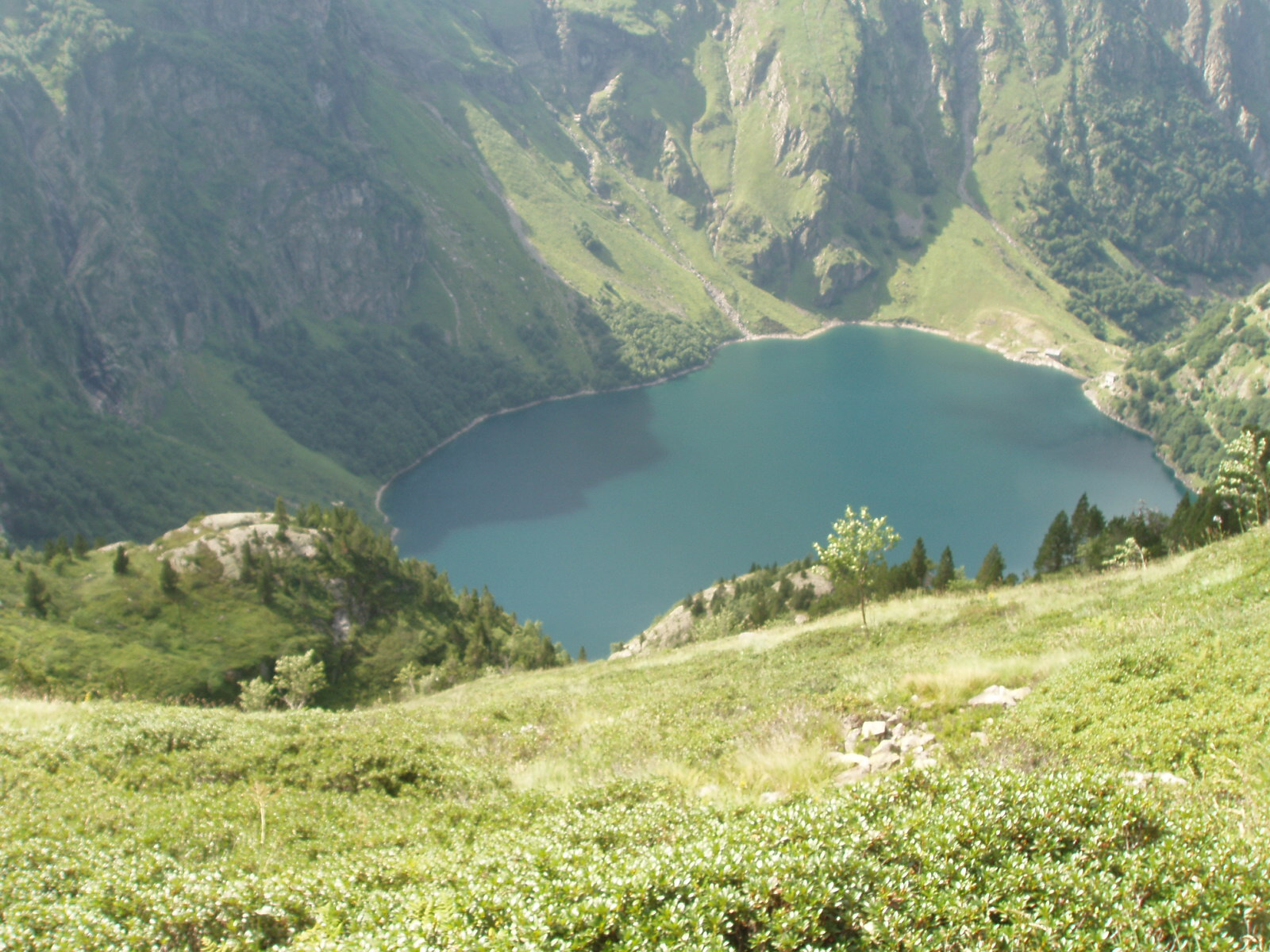

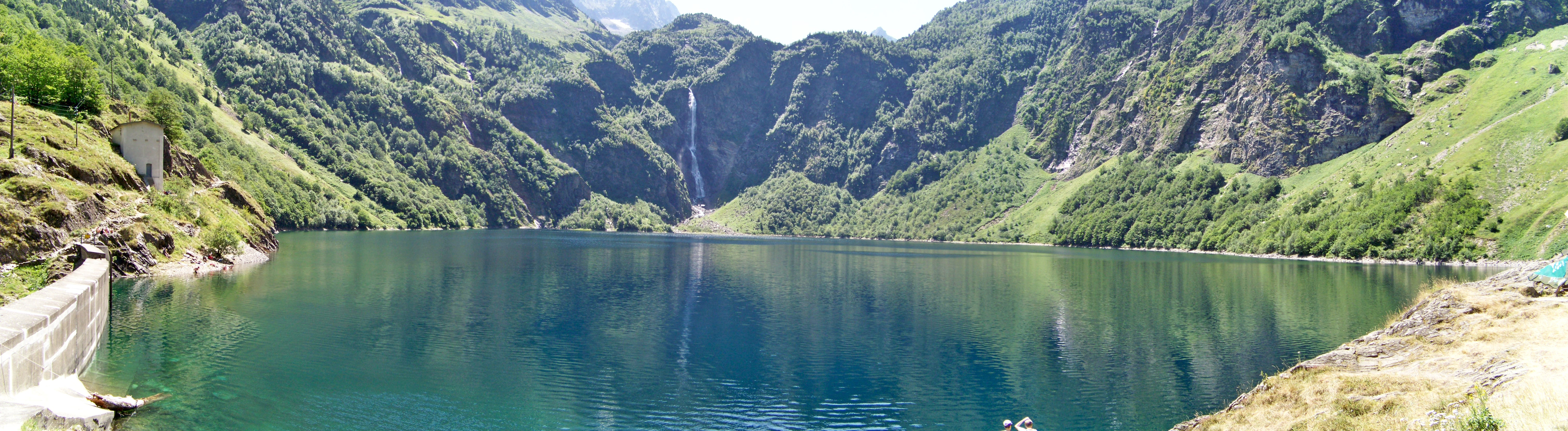

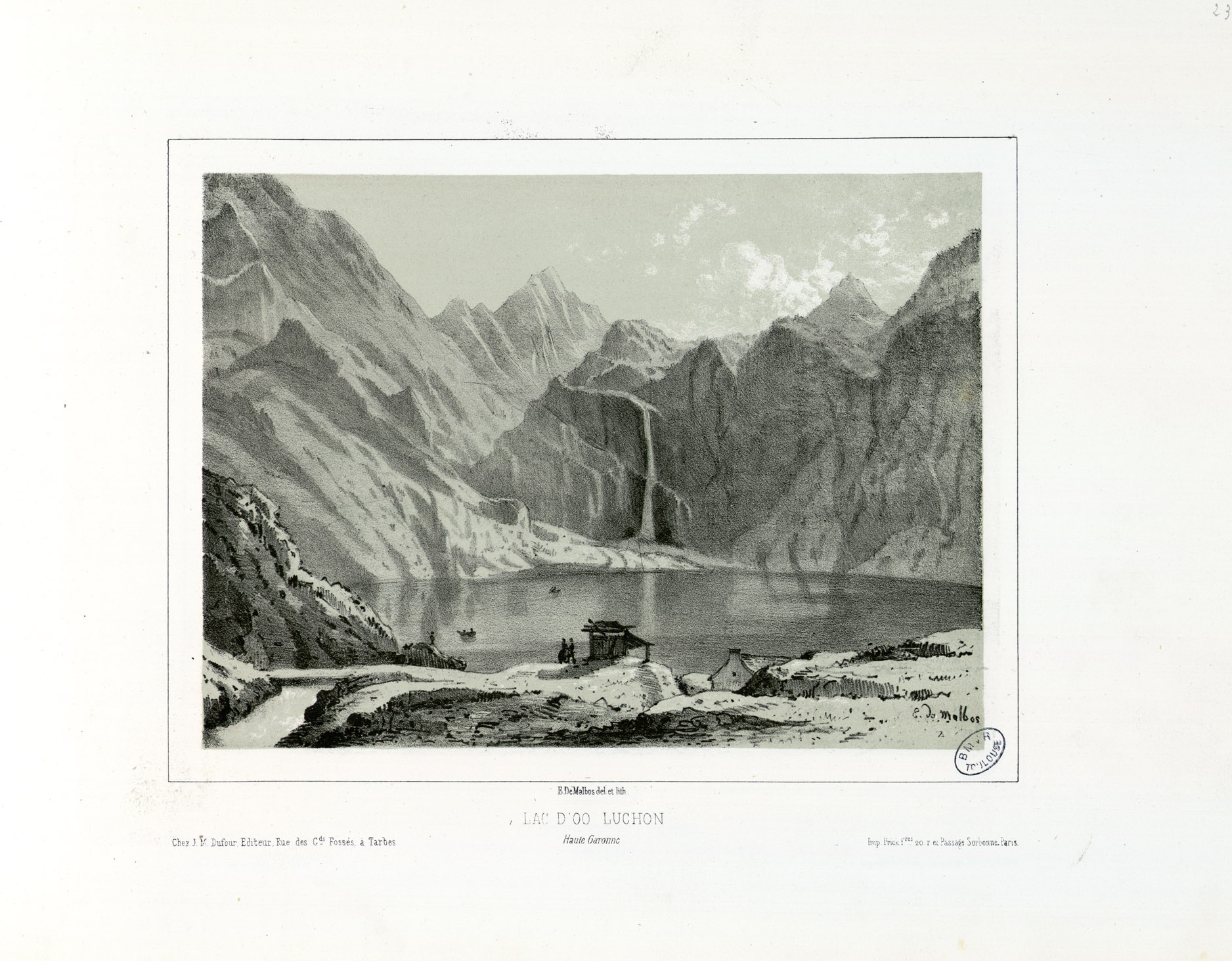
by Eugène de Malbos, near 1840
