= Center of Concern =

Catholic think tank in Washington, D.C.

Coordinates: 38°56′3.87″N 76°59′23.12″W

- Abbreviation: Center
- Established: 1971; 55 years ago
- Purpose: Social justice
- Location(s): 1015 15th Street, NW, Suite 600; Washington, D.C.
- Region served: Global
- Interim President: Dianna Ortiz
- Chair of Board: Marie Dennis
- Main organ: Education for Justice
- Affiliations: Catholic Charities USA, CIDSE, United Nations Economic and Social Council
- Website: coc.org

Center of Concern (Center) was a think tank in Washington, D.C., that Jesuit Superior General Pedro Arrupe and National Conference of Catholic Bishops General Secretary Joseph Bernardin (later Cardinal Bernardin) co-founded on May 4, 1971. The Center was created as a joint project of the Society of Jesus and the National Conference of Catholic Bishops (now United States Conference of Catholic Bishops). On October 12, 2018, the Center of Concern announced that it no longer had the financial resources to sustain normal operations and that it had terminated all of its paid staff.

== History ==
=== Beginnings ===
The context for the founding of the Center was the document “Justice in the World” produced by the Synod of Bishops in Rome in 1971. At this synod, the world’s Catholic bishops decreed: “Action on behalf of justice and participation in the transformation of the world fully appear to us as a constitutive dimension of the preaching of the Gospel, or, in other words, of the Church's mission for the redemption of the human race and its liberation from every oppressive situation.”

The Center's purpose was to study issues of development, justice, and peace from a global perspective. From the start, the Center convened discussions regarding development, justice, and peace from a global perspective, reading the sign of the times and supporting United Nations, Catholic social tradition, and other frameworks for such issues as population, hunger, environment, poverty, habitat, science and technology, and women’s empowerment.

The Center's founding director, William F. Ryan, served from 1971 to 1978. His assistant, Peter J. Henriot, succeeded him and served from 1978 to 1988.

In the late 1970s, the center's work concerned what some in the Vatican viewed it as an inappropriate foray into political activism.

=== 1980s and 1990s ===
Beginning in the 1980s, the Center focused more on analysis of emerging social movements within the United States, on behalf of women, workers, the poor, and peace issues. The Center assisted the U.S. Catholic bishops with their pastoral letters on racism, peace, and the U.S. economy. In the 1990s, turning again to U.N. conferences and development abroad, the Center focused on the work of global civil society and social service organizations and community-centered, local, and grassroots organizations to complement the work of intergovernmental organizations to aid the poorest people in the world .

=== New millennium ===
In 2000 the Center organized an initiative involving its Rethinking Bretton Woods Project Justice, which began in 1995, and explored the policy implications for debt relief for poor nations. Following this, the Center welcomed the news that the U.S. Congress and administration cancelled the bilateral debt of over 30 Heavily Indebted Poor Countries (HIPC).

The Center founded Education for Justice in 2001 as a Web-based global subscription service to provide a bridge of conversation between Catholic social tradition and the signs of the times in terms accessible to members in high schools, universities, parishes, religious congregations, and healthcare organizations, as well as for individuals. Education for Justice's founder Jane Deren and director Sr. Katherine Feely won the Harry A. Fagan Roundtable Award in 2011.

The Center represented the United States in the global lay Catholic development and advocacy alliance, Coopération Internationale pour le Développement et la Solidarité (CIDSE) and is a member of Catholic Charities USA. It had been accredited with consultative status before the United Nations Economic and Social Council since 1974.

The Center ceased operations in late 2018, though the board found a new “home” for Education for Justice, now a part of the Ignatian Solidarity Network.

== See also ==
- America (Jesuit magazine)
