= JESC =

JESC may stand for:

- Junior Eurovision Song Contest
- Jesuit European Social Centre
