= History of secularism in France =

From 1789 to present day

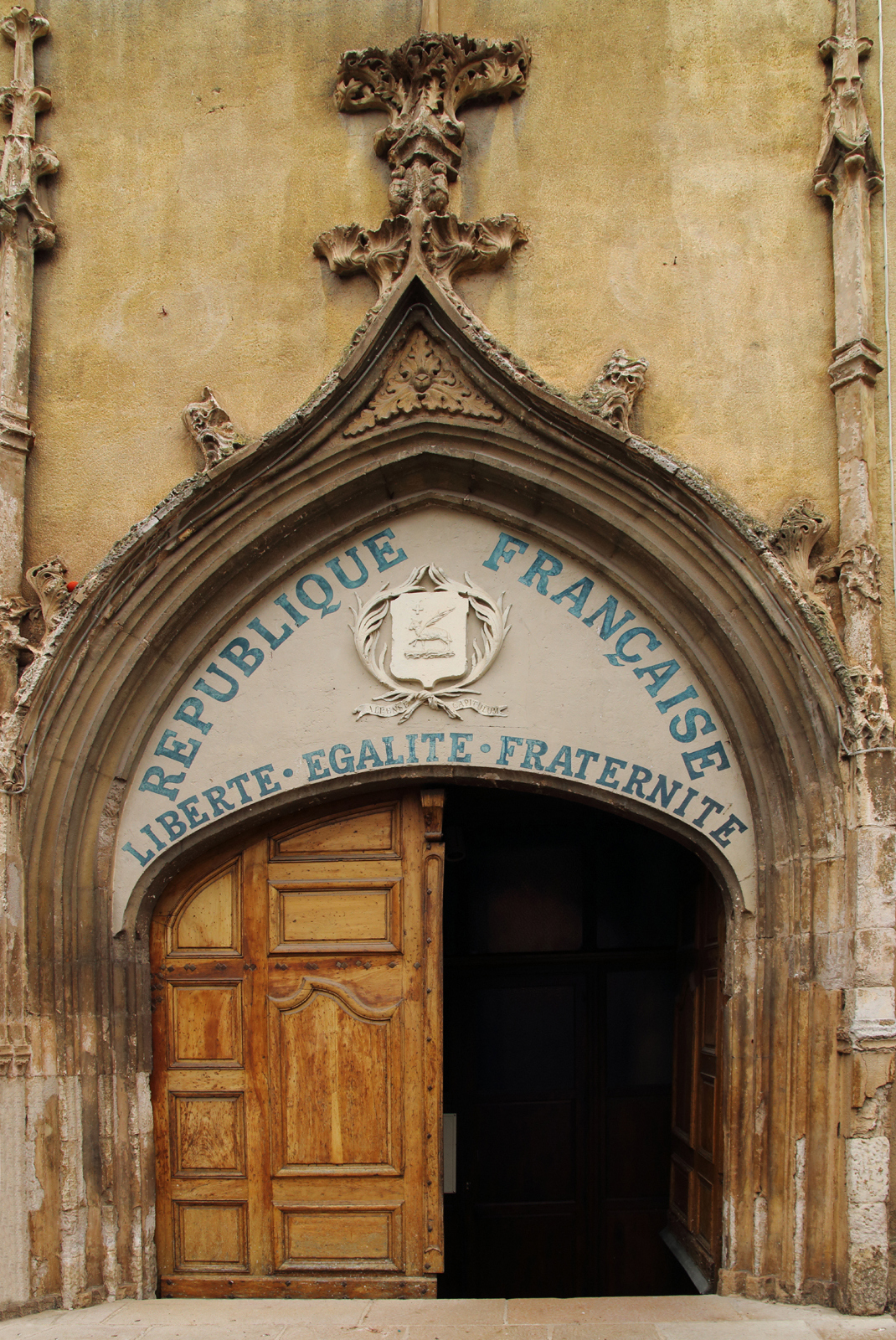
The motto of the French Republic on the tympanum of a church in Aups in 1905.

The history of secularism in France is the birth and development of this principle up to the present day.

Secularism first took shape in France during the French Revolution: the abolition of the Ancien Régime in August 1789 was accompanied by the end of ecclesiastical privileges, the reaffirmation of universal principles, including freedom of conscience, and the limitation of religious freedoms expressed in the Declaration of the Rights of Man.

In the 19th century, secularization laws gradually freed the State from its historical ties with the Catholic Church and created new political and social norms based on the principle of republican universalism. This process, part of a broader movement associated with modernity, entrusted the sovereign populace with the redefinition of political and social foundations—such as legislative power, civil rites, and the evolution of law and morality—independently of any religious dogma.

To support this principle and reduce Catholic resistance to it, the Third Republic nationalized education and healthcare activities that had not previously been handled by the state. This revolutionized the organization of hospitals and the school system. For the latter, the Jules Ferry laws secularized education, which had been public and compulsory since 1833. This period was marked by an educational war between the Republic and the Church. The Republic expelled the Jesuits from France, followed by all other teaching congregations in 1903. In 1904, it prohibited religious from teaching, a ban that was only lifted in 1940 by the Vichy regime. Passed in 1905, the law separating Church and State, which marked the culmination of an assertive secularization process, nationalized Church property for a second time, and prohibited the State from subsidizing any religious denomination.

Since Bonaparte's Civil Code, which defined divorce for the first time, the State has legislated and used secularism to devise new rules of law for the family and the individual. With the French Constitution of 1958, secularism became the foundation of the republican pact, guaranteeing national uniformity.

Under the terms of the Declaration of 1789, which forms part of today's constitutional bloc, religious freedom is limited by the public order defined by law. Movements that do not adhere to this public order are typically classified as sects. Such movements can be entirely banned under the About-Picard law. However, despite this legislation, there is no consensus on the legal criteria for condemning an entire movement, aside from the crimes or misdemeanors committed by its members.

== The origins of secularism ==
=== Definitions ===
Historian René Rémond cautions against asserting definitively that the idea of separation between temporal and spiritual powers is present in the Gospel verse: "Render to Caesar what is Caesar's, and to God what is God's" (Luke 20:25). Today, this Gospel excerpt may have more to say about the distinction between Caesar and God than was in Jesus' mind, or in the way the writer intended to convey his message.

Theologian Henri Madelin, on the other hand, argues that secularism has its origins in the foundational texts of Christianity. He contends that it emerged during the Wars of Religion "to stabilize the religious dynamics within Western societies." According to him, "we should be delighted to have religions that have interpretative principles, that have invented a model where there is a relationship between Caesar and God, between politics and religion".

According to philosopher Henri Peña-Ruiz, "Caesar is a figure of political domination, Marianne is a figure of the emancipated people, of the Republic giving itself its own law". In his view, secularism cannot be reduced to the "abstract separation" of the temporal and the spiritual. If, from the Revolution onwards, secularism removed society and its institutions from any clerical tutelage, it was only after the Enlightenment had affirmed universal values (freedom of conscience, equality of citizenship, common law) rooted "in the legacy of an entire culture of critical thought" and in "the desire for autonomous thought, dear to the philosophers" of Antiquity.

For Jean-Michel Ducomte, professor of public law, secularism, far from finding its source in religion, "is first and foremost a process of emancipation from the pretensions of the Churches to found the social and political order".

Historian Georges Weill distinguishes four currents that contributed to the secular conception of the State: "Catholics, heirs to the Gallican tradition of the Ancien Régime monarchy; liberal Protestants; deists of all persuasions; and freethinkers and atheists".

The following paragraphs outline the historical foundations on which these theses are based, without positioning them against one another.

=== The medieval foundations of secularism ===
The foundations of secularism, or the historical underpinnings that facilitated its emergence, largely originated within the Church itself. The investiture controversy between Pope Gregory VII and the German Emperor in the 11th century, in which the Pope sought to define his independence and that of the Church alongside the political powers, is a fundamental point. This episode confirmed that spiritual and political powers can, and ultimately must, be separated.

The rediscovery of Aristotelian philosophy in the 13th century, by contributing to the construction of a political thought built on the foundations of natural order and reason, is also one of the distant intellectual foundations that later and progressively enabled the emergence of secular thought and its political application.

=== Gallicanism and the distinction of powers ===
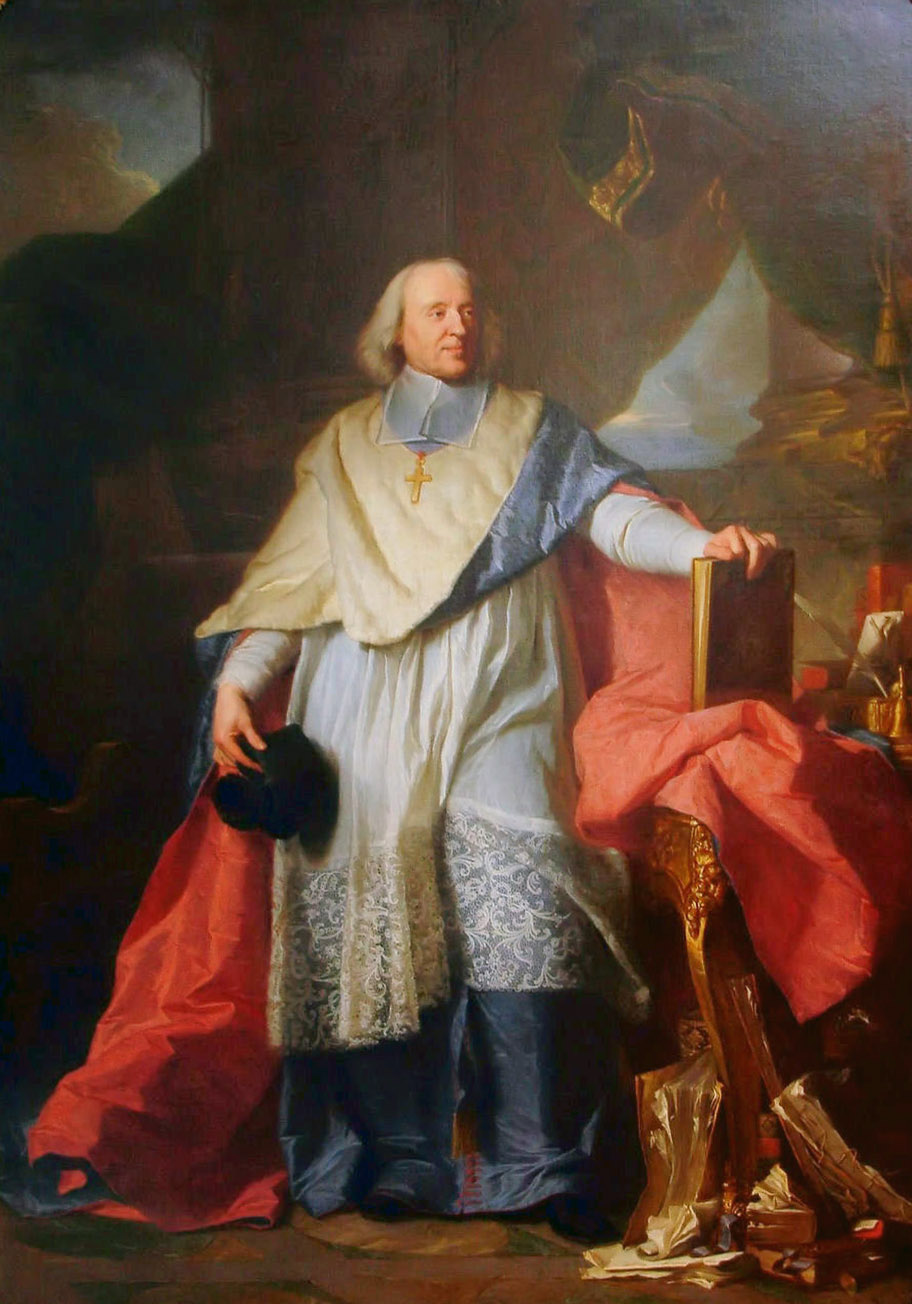
Bossuet, principal author of the Declaration of the Clergy of France, portrait by Hyacinthe Rigaud.

Gallicanism (borrowed from the medieval Latin gallicanus, meaning "French") is a specifically French religious and political doctrine that seeks to limit papal intervention in the management of Catholic Church affairs. Its origins can be traced back to King Philip the Fair 's reaction to the theocratic ambitions of Pope Boniface VIII.

Between the 15th and 16th centuries, Gallicanism was formalized in a series of texts (notably the Pragmatic Sanction of Bourges) that affirmed the theological and legal dependence of the French Church on the State, and the superiority of royal power over the Papacy. However, it was tempered in 1516 by the Concordat of Bologna, signed between King Francis I and Pope Leo X, which allowed widespread royal control over episcopal and abbatial appointments, giving rise to the commendation system.

Gallicanism was articulated in the Declaration of the Clergy of France, drafted by Bossuet on the initiative of Louis XIV, at the clergy assembly of 1682. The Pope's power was declared to be purely spiritual; monarchs could not be subject to him. It stipulated that papal judgments on matters of faith must be validated by the Roman Catholic Church in France and should not contradict the customs of the kingdom. The Pope, wishing to avoid a rupture similar to that provoked by Henry VIII in England, at the origin of Anglicanism, was forced to accept this situation.

However, Louis XIV soon found himself caught in a trap when Gallicanism and Jansenism were too closely linked. French Gallicanism included a conciliarist aspect that posited the authority of the Pope as subordinate to the authority of the Church gathered in council, a stance reminiscent of richerism. The Jansenists, who were vigorously opposed by Louis XIV, significantly influenced Gallicanism in this richerist direction. This connection quickly became a threat to the king, who feared that this conciliarist demand, articulated on a religious level, could lead to similar political demands, such as the Estates General declaring superiority over monarchical authority. Consequently, Louis XIV did not fully implement Gallicanism, choosing instead to ally with the Pope to combat Jansenism.

=== The Edict of Nantes and religious freedom ===
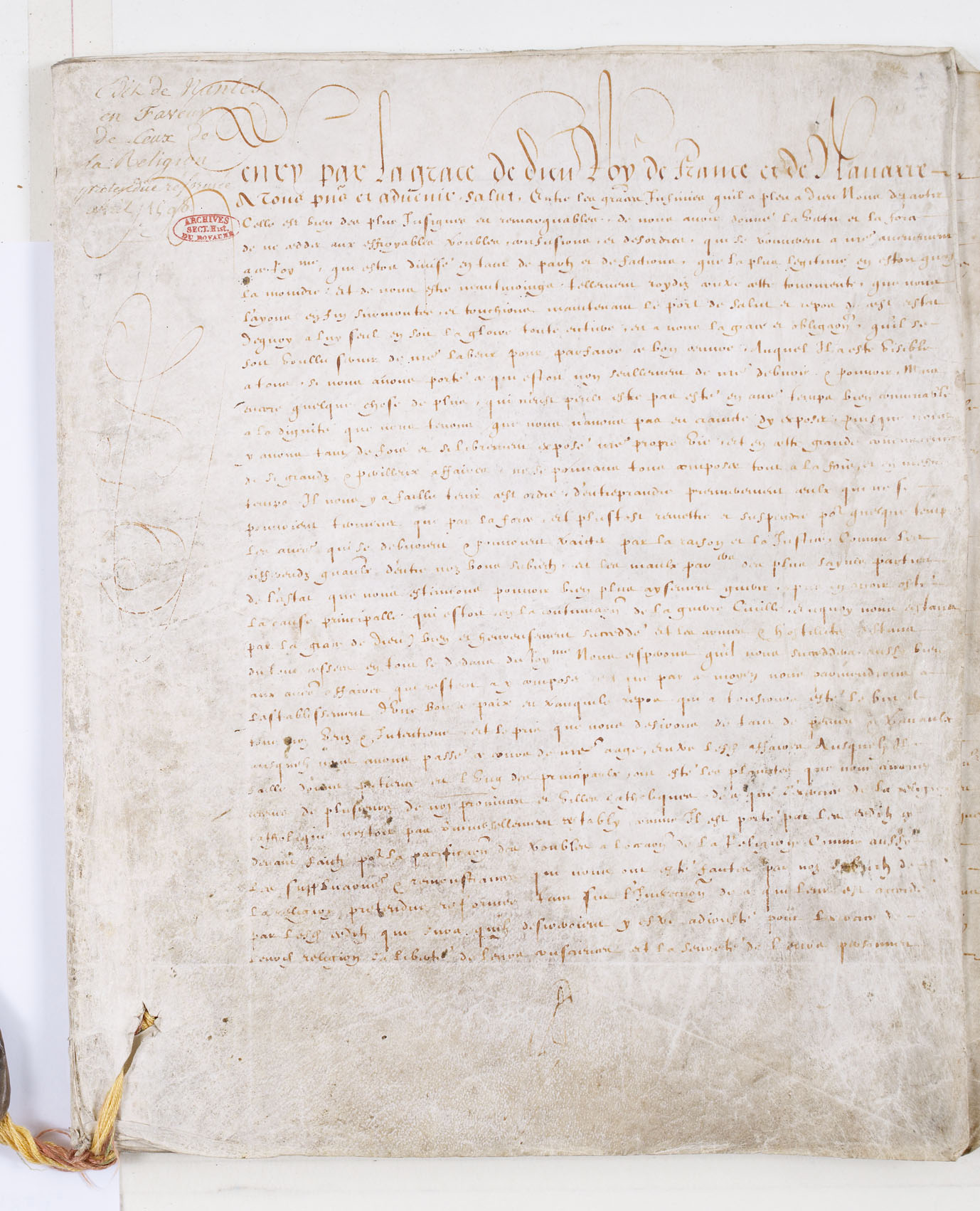
The edict of Nantes, 1598

In 1598, the Edict of Nantes also marked an important step towards strengthening absolutist royal power in France. To a certain extent (notably excluding Jews), it guaranteed freedom of religious conscience throughout the kingdom, allowing Protestants to worship freely in places where they had established communities prior to 1597. According to Pierre Joxe, the Edict of Nantes marks a turning point in the history of mentalities, as it delineates a distinction between the political subject, who must adhere to the king's laws in the public sphere, and the believer, who is free to make personal religious choices, now relegated to the private sphere. Nevertheless, the Edict reaffirmed that Catholicism was the sole recognized religion.

The legitimacy of absolute monarchy was rooted in divine right (embodied in the coronation of the king with oil from the holy ampulla), so it could not do without the Catholic Church. Between 1660 and 1685, the kingdom embarked on a policy of converting Protestants to Catholicism, even to the point of persecution (dragonnades). After emptying it of its content, Louis XIV revoked the Edict of Nantes by signing the Edict of Fontaine bleau in 1685.

=== The Age of Enlightenment ===
Although the term itself is more recent, the philosophical and political idea of secularism appeared in England at the end of the 17th century, with King James II's notion of "indulgence" as universal freedom of conscience.

This idea was restricted by the Glorious Revolution of 1688, based on John Locke's notion of "toleration", which concerned Protestants only and excluded Catholicism and Judaism. This inspired the Bill of Rights of 1689 and the Act of Settlement of 1701.

The founding text of the idea of secularism is John Locke's Essay on toleration, which considers that the acceptability of a religious idea is measured by the fact that it respects the public order defined by civil law. This principle was to be found in the Declaration of Rights of 1689, and also in the Declaration of Rights of 1789, which stipulates that "no one should be disturbed for his opinions, even religious ones, provided that their manifestation does not disturb the public order established by the Law".

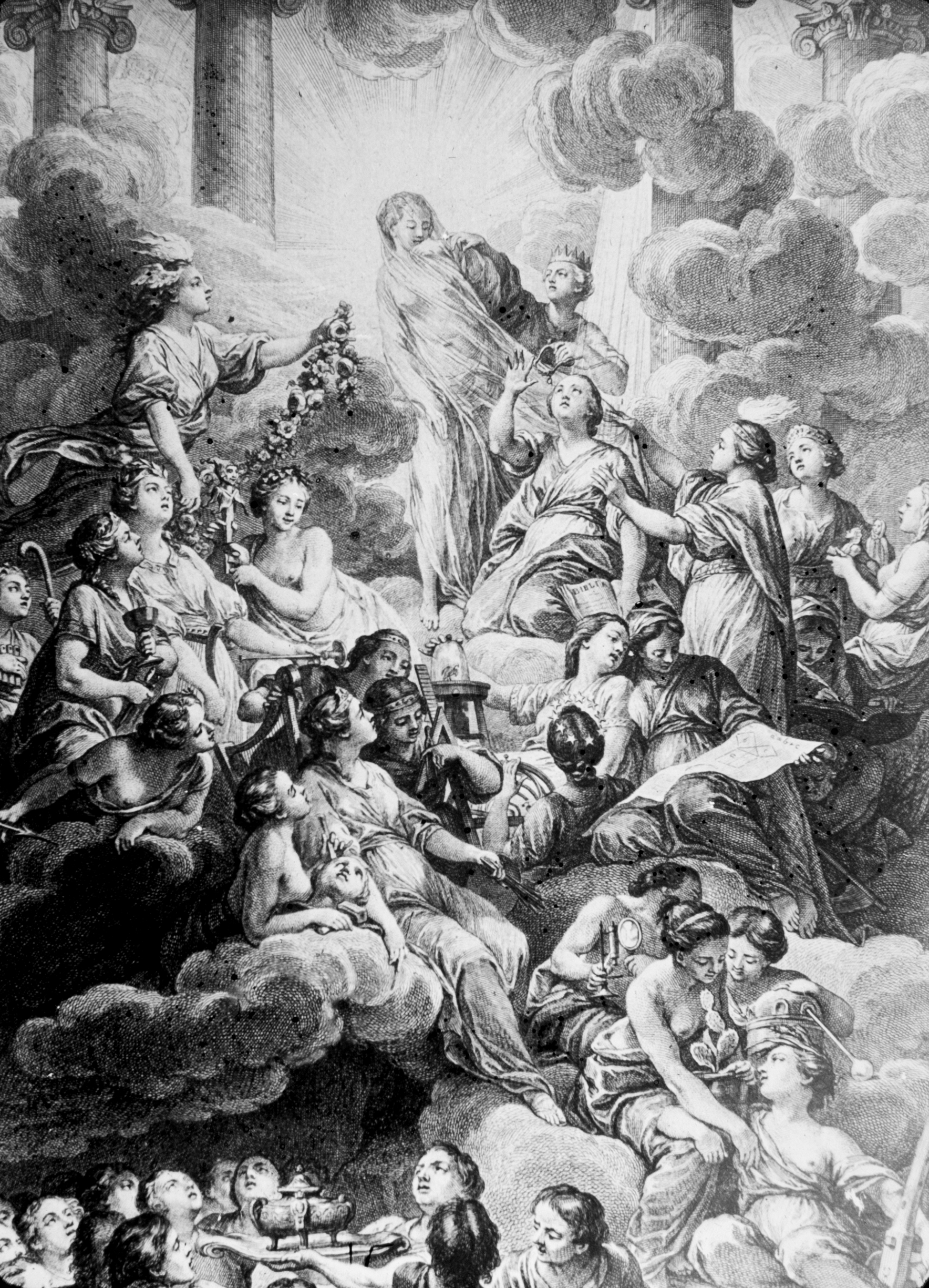
Frontispiece for Diderot and d'Alembert's Encyclopédie: Truth shines with light, and on the right, Reason and Philosophy tear away its veil. Engraving by Prévost after Cochin, 1772.

This English idea was adopted by the philosophy of the Enlightenment, which emphasized the primacy of civil law over divine law. It promoted the coexistence of all religions that accepted this principle while opposing those that did not, expressing a desire to formally distinguish between religious doctrines and state policies.

At the time, the aim was to counter the power of the Catholic Church, and to promote the sovereign's action in the legislative sphere. The undermining of the religious basis of legislative legitimacy made it possible to establish republican or democratic regimes, in which the law was the sole expression of the will of the political state. The questioning of Catholic moral authority brought with it the possibility of a change in mores, notably in financial matters (authorization of interest-bearing loans, marine insurance), family matters (divorce, previously permitted only for Protestants), sexual matters (libertinism), as well as the authorization of slavery.

Voltaire, an admirer of Locke and Newton who had also contributed to the Glorious Revolution, wrote his Traité sur la Tolérance (Treatise on Toleration) on the occasion of the trial of Jean Calas, in which he argued that the political order could do without religious constraints, as did Montesquieu in De l'Esprit des Lois (The Spirit of Law).

Jean-Jacques Rousseau, in Du contrat social, expounded on the concept of popular sovereignty and the notion of general interest, asserting that individuals must consent to surrender part of their "natural rights" for the benefit of the collective. This tension between civic equality and individual freedom "expresses the tension between the citizen and the person, between public and private space".

Denis Diderot, in La Religieuse, insults Catholic religious orders, which Protestants have always opposed.

Condorcet, in Réflexions sur l'esclavage des nègres, defends the emancipation of Jews, developing the universal principle of human rights.

In 1766, the Chevalier de La Barre was condemned to ordinary and extraordinary torture, which included having his fist and tongue cut off, followed by decapitation and the burning of a copy of Voltaire 's Dictionnaire philosophique found in his home. His (alleged) crime was singing libertine songs disrespectful of religion, passing in front of a religious procession without removing his headgear, and failing to kneel as the procession passed. Voltaire and Victor Hugo, among others, made the Chevalier de La Barre a legendary hero of secularism.

However, there was generally no formal discrimination against Protestants in 18th-century France. This is evidenced by the fact that two of the century's most influential finance ministers, John Law and Jacques Necker, were Calvinists. The 1713 encyclical against the Jansenists was not even registered by the Parlement de Paris, nor was the 1738 encyclical against Freemasonry. On the other hand, in 1763, the Parliament of Paris decided to expel the Catholic Society of Jesus from France.

At the instigation of Louis XVI, Malesherbes published his Mémoire sur le mariage des protestants in 1785, and in 1787 pushed through the Édit de Tolérance (Edict of Tolerance), which organized the civil status of non-Catholics, thus initiating the beginning of legal recognition of the plurality of mores stemming from different faiths. Prior to this, civil status had been recorded in parish registers, which posed a challenge for Protestants, who lacked their own institutional framework to manage it.

Consequently, one of the last laws passed by the Legislative Assembly in 1792 established a public civil registry, including provisions for divorce. It was Bonaparte, then First Consul, who codified the acceptable grounds for divorce in the Civil Code, representing the first instance of state intervention in matters of morality without religious justification. Divorce was thus the initial act by which the French state asserted its moral authority.

== The emergence of secularism ==
=== The end of kingship by divine right ===
The French Revolution established the principles of secularism, including the separation of state and religion, secularization, equality of religions, and freedom of conscience. However, these principles were partially nullified by the Concordat.

==== 1789 Declaration of the Rights of Man and of the Citizen ====
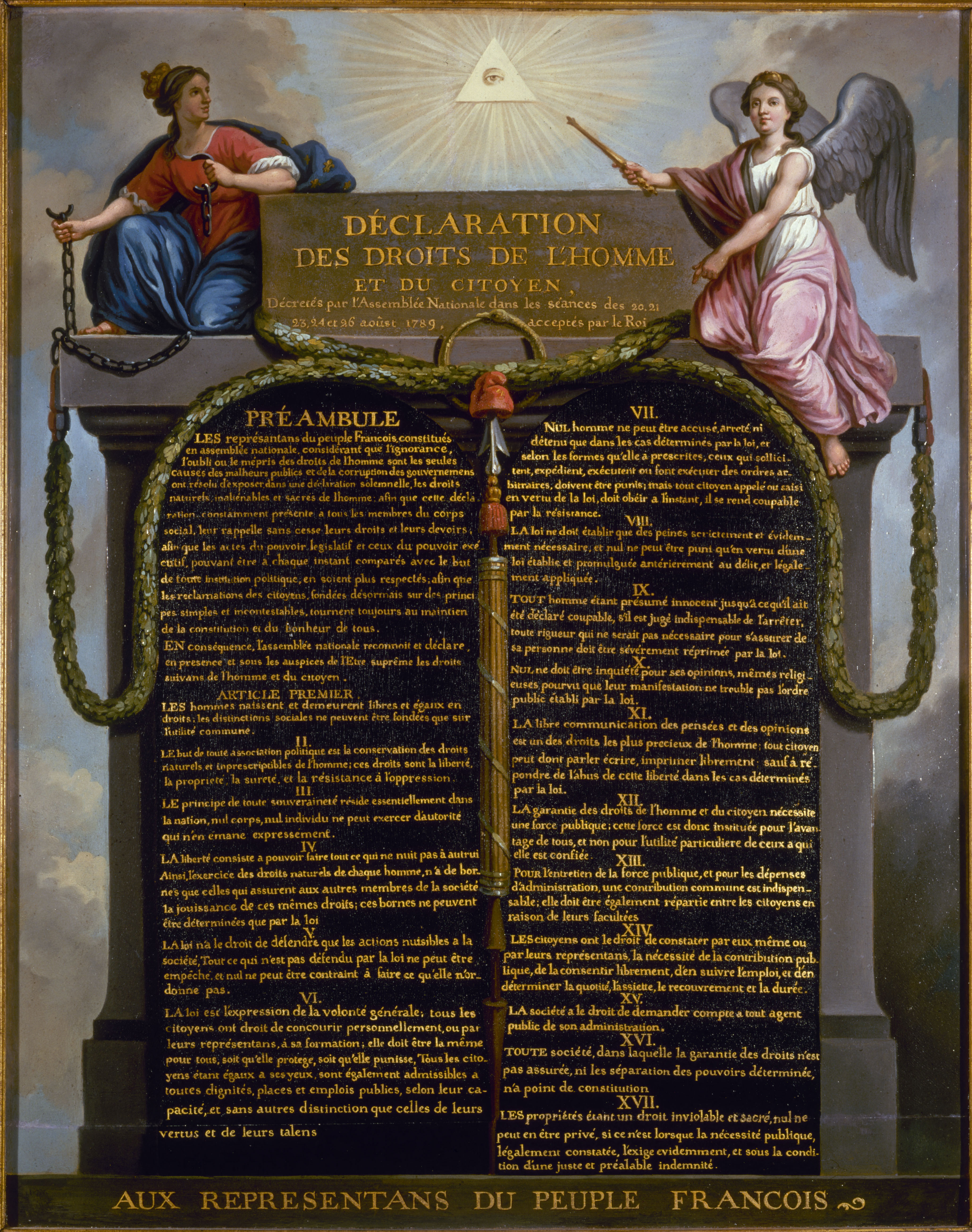
The Declaration of the Rights of Man and of the Citizen of 1789

When the Constituent Assembly was formed, the starting point of the French Revolution, the clergy joined forces with the Third Estate and voted with them for the Declaration of the Rights of Man and of the Citizen of August 26, 1789. Article X of the Declaration states:

No one may be troubled for his opinions, even religious ones, provided that their expression does not disturb the public order established by law.

This article affirms both a right—the freedom to express one’s religious opinions—and a duty—the obligation to respect the law.

On November 2, Talleyrand, bishop of Autun, proposed using the property of the clergy to pay off the nation's debts. This decision was also approved by the representatives of the clergy.

==== Civil Constitution of the Clergy ====
The French Revolution attempted to impose state supervision of the Church through the Civil Constitution of the Clergy, which was proclaimed on July 12, 1790. Prior to this, the Assembly had already begun to intervene in the Church of France: clergy property was confiscated and religious were "invited" to leave their convents. Religious heritage came under State ownership, with the State responsible for maintaining the clergy and places of worship. While the need for money was the short-term reason for this provision, which made it possible to sell most monasteries as "national property" and recuperate money, the desire to place the Church under State trusteeship was very real. Monastic vows were banned as contrary to human rights, and congregations were suppressed on February 13, 1790.

Prints contrasting the "patriotic" and "aristocratic" priest

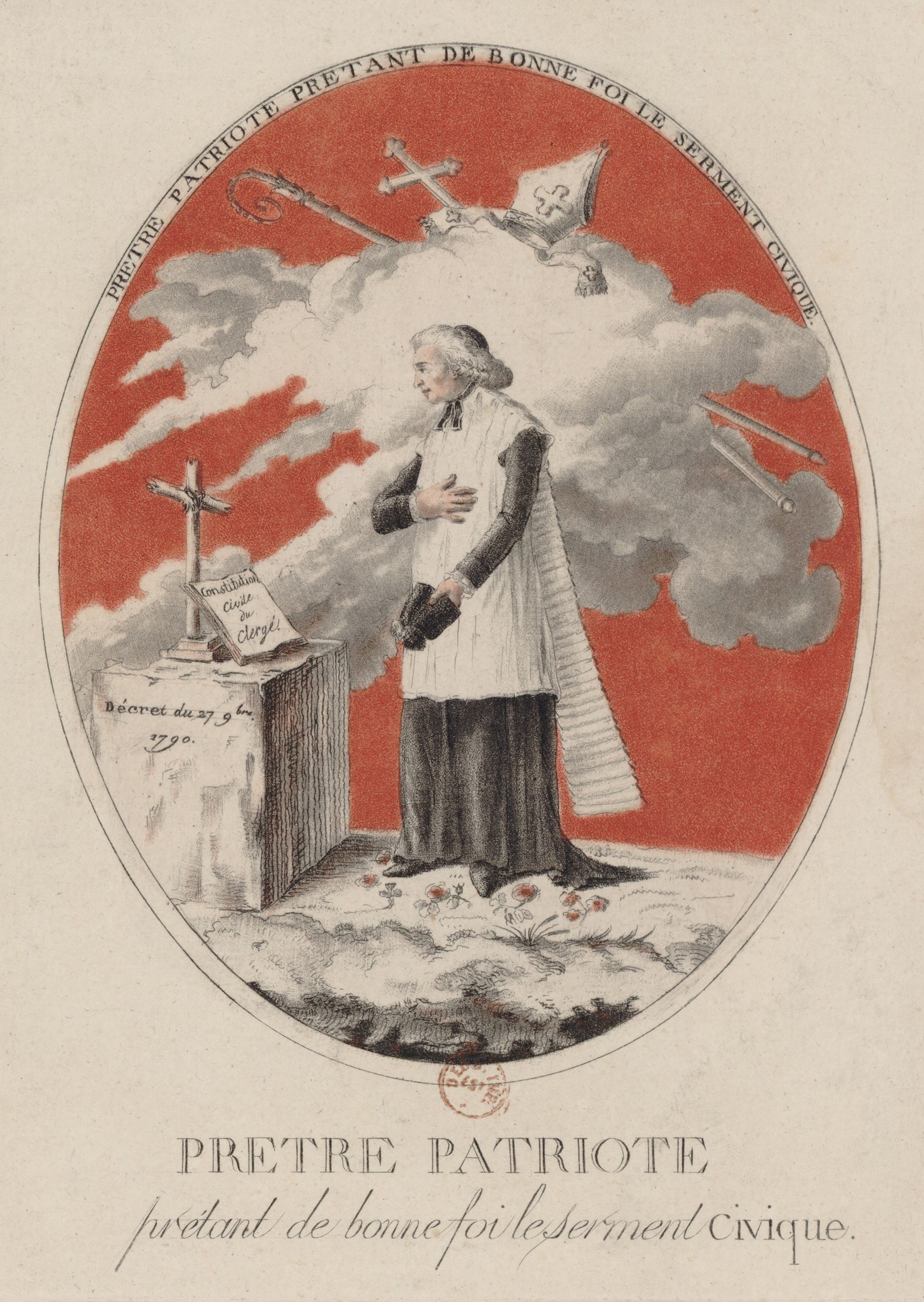

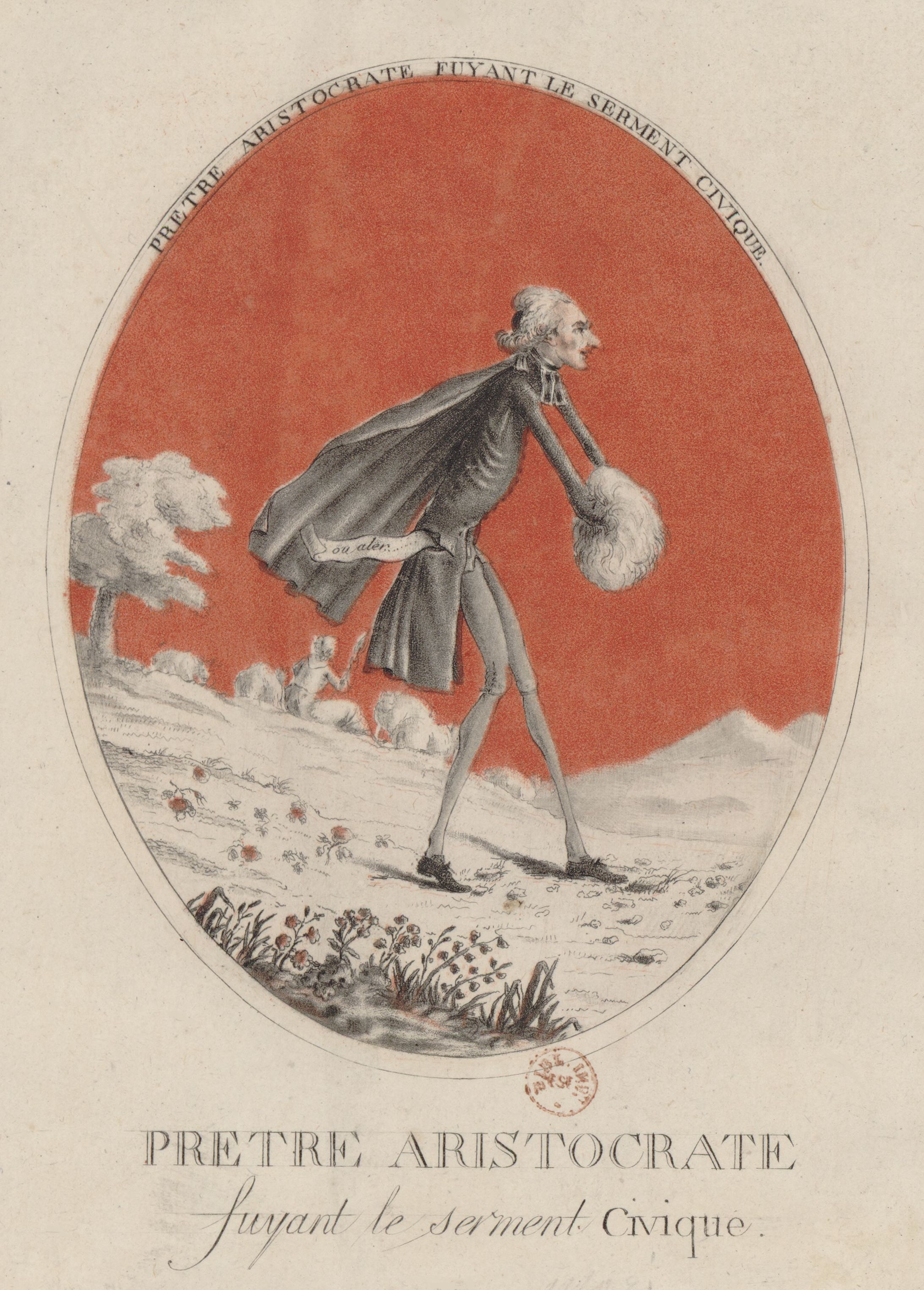

The aim of the Civil Constitution of the Clergy was to establish the supremacy of civil law over religious morality. While acknowledging the role of religion in civic life, the Assembly sought to abolish it as a source of public morality and to replace it with political order. This approach effectively sacralized the legislative power of the state, positioning it above "divine laws". The Church of France, reshaped by the Civil Constitution of the Clergy, saw its Gallicanism accentuated, and its temporal organization turned upside down: dioceses were reshaped according to departmental divisions, bishops were elected, as were parish priests. The hierarchy was modelled on the political system, and the Pope's temporal authority was clearly weakened.

In the face of criticism of the Civil Constitution of the Clergy by many bishops, and despite the support of some of the clergy, the Assembly required all Catholic clergy to swear an oath of loyalty to the Constitution from January 4, 1791. Refractory clergymen were gradually suppressed, in the name of "respect for public order established by law".

Pope Pius VI condemned the principles of the French Revolution in March 1791. He clearly opposed the civil constitution of the clergy and the Constituent Assembly's unilateral revocation of the Concordat of Bologna. Human rights were also roundly criticized as "contrary to religion and society".

The Constitution of 1791, although not implemented, guaranteed freedom of worship but continued to fund Catholic priests exclusively, contingent upon the confiscation of clergy property.

In September 1791, a draft decree proposed organizing civil festivals, including the Fédération on July 14, commemorating the events of July 14, 1789, as a celebration of reconciliation and unity among all French people.

However, the decree stipulated that all Christian ceremonies were excluded from these festivities, asserting that "the severe majesty of the Christian religion" should not intermingle with these secular celebrations and "their noisy transports" (Article 7).

From 1792 onwards, refractory clergy were treated as suspects and subjected to special surveillance, even imprisonment in the event of disobedience. Then, with the Terror, the constitutional Church was also severely repressed.

==== First secular texts and arrangements ====
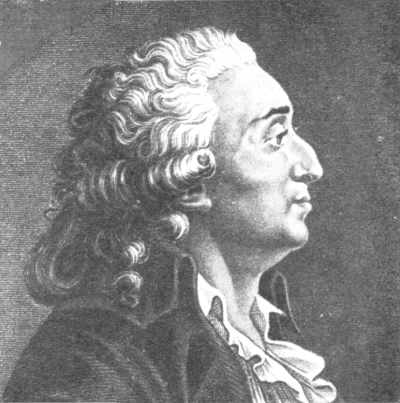
Condorcet, 1793

In 1792, Condorcet presented the Convention with a plan to organize public education based on secular principles. This initiative sought to establish public education as a new function of the state, which at the time was not involved in teaching. Although the plan was never implemented, his Rapport sur l'instruction publique (Report on Public Instruction) emphasized "the liberation of the mind" as a fundamental element of education. Condorcet argued for the exclusion of all political doctrines, religious authority, and intellectual or pedagogical dogma from schools:

The Constitution, in recognizing the right of each individual to choose his or her religion, in establishing complete equality between all the inhabitants of France, does not allow the admission of teaching in public education that would give particular dogmas an advantage contrary to the freedom of opinions.

With the law of September 20, 1792, civil status was entrusted to town halls, and priests were forbidden from registering baptisms and deaths, which sparked resistance. The registration of births, marriages, and deaths had already been possible through local police officers—functions often performed by local parish priests—particularly to accommodate Protestants who lacked parish registers. Registration of divorce was authorized, the act itself being left to the discretion of the denomination. Secularization extended to marriage, the calendar, education and public assistance.

Although inciting de-Christianization through the action of certain representatives on mission, the Revolution remained alien to the notion of secularism and wished to preserve the idea of basing the country's unity on a national religion. This context helps to understand the attempts at revolutionary cults.

The cult of Reason proposed by Jacques-René Hébert prefigures Auguste Comte's Religion of Humanity, and represents the non-deistic tendency of the Enlightenment. The cult of the Supreme Being proposed by Robespierre represents the deist tendency. Robespierre proclaimed the immortality of the soul, asserting, "The idea of the Supreme Being and the immortality of the soul is a continual reminder of justice; it is therefore social and republican".

Neither of these new religions enjoyed much popular success. But the attacks on the Catholic religion were not accepted everywhere, and in western France, the repression of refractory priests, compulsory conscription for the armies of the Republic and the execution of the King on January 21, 1793 led to an uprising of Catholics. This led to the Chouans revolt and the start of the Vendée War, which lasted until 1796.

The Republic abolished the budget of the constitutional Church with the decree of 2 sansculottides an II (September 18, 1794), and affirmed the complete separation of religion and State with the law of 2 pluviôse an III (January 21, 1795):

The Republic does not pay salaries to any cult, nor provide any premises. The law recognizes no minister. All worship is forbidden outside consecrated places.

On Ventôse 3, Year III (February 21, 1795), freedom of worship was established by decree:

The exercise of any religion may not be disturbed. [...] The Republic does not pay salaries to any. [...] Anyone who violently disturbs the ceremonies of any religion, or outrages its objects, will be punished.

This decree allowed churches - some of which had been transformed into temples of Reason, or even warehouses - to reopen, marking the end of repression of religious expression. Freedom of expression for all religions is guaranteed. The text did, however, severely restrict freedom of worship, prohibiting "appearing in public wearing the vestments, ornaments or costumes assigned to religious ceremonies", and even stipulating that "no sign peculiar to a religion may be placed in a public place [...], [that] no inscription may designate the place assigned to it [and that] no proclamation or public convocation may be made inviting citizens to attend". Boissy d'Anglas, promoter of the decree, accompanied its promulgation with a speech on freedom of worship before the National Convention:

Citizens, religion has been banished from the government, and will never return. Your maxims must be those of enlightened tolerance, but perfect independence. [...] Religious practices can also be exercised; they are not offenses against society. The empire of opinion is vast enough for everyone to live within it in peace. [...] Cults, whatever they may be, will have no preference from you.

Some of the terms of the Ventôse 3 decree were to be repeated in article 354 of the Constitution of Year III, proclaimed by the Thermidorian Convention on 5 fructidor year III (August 22, 1795):

No one may be prevented from exercising, in conformity with the laws, the religion he has chosen. No one may be forced to contribute to the expenses of a religion. The Republic does not pay salaries to any of them.

In 1795, the Daunou law established a calendar of secular holidays, including Republic Day, Youth Day and Husband's Day. The two churches, the refractory and the constitutional, tried to reorganize themselves independently of each other, and even attempted a few unsuccessful rapprochements.

In Year V (1797), for fear of royalist demands, the clergy were once again harassed, this time by the Directoire. Following Napoleon Bonaparte 's military successes in Italy, the Pope was expelled from Rome.

=== From the Consulate to the Second Republic ===
Under the Consulate and Empire

A concordat is a diplomatic agreement between the Holy See and a sovereign state. After his coup d'état on 18 Brumaire, Napoleon Bonaparte wanted to dissociate the cause of the monarchy from that of the Catholic religion and establish moral order. To this end, he signed the Concordat of 1801, which re-established relations with the Catholic Church in Rome.

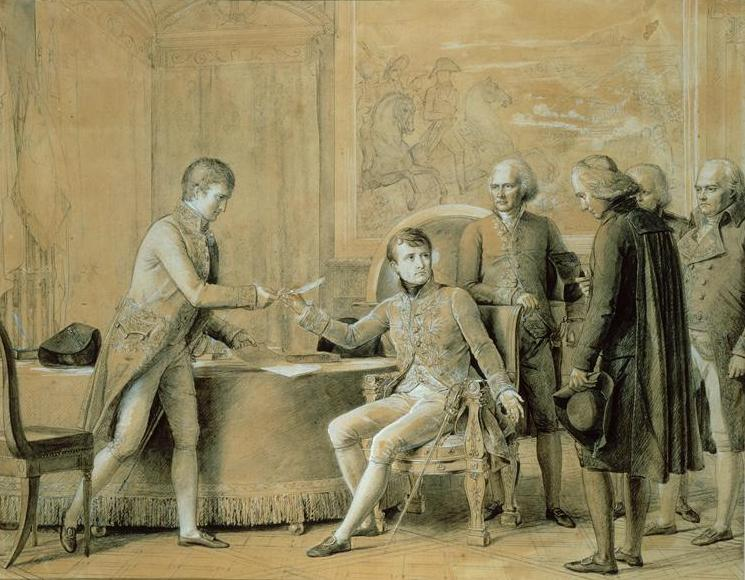
Signing of the Concordat between France and the Holy See, July 15, 1801 by Gérard.

This agreement was more a compromise between the Consulate and the Papacy than a true alliance. Under this document, the Pope recognized the Republic and renounced the property taken from the clergy during the Revolution. In return, the government of the French Republic recognized that the Catholic, Apostolic and Roman religion had the support of the vast majority of French citizens, without making it a state religion.

The document is succinct and relatively vague. Article 1 re-establishes the free exercise of Catholic worship: "The Catholic, Apostolic, and Roman religion will be freely exercised in France.

Archbishops and bishops are now appointed by the government, but receive their canonical institution from the Pope. The document also stipulates that "the Holy See, in concert with the government, will establish a new circumscription of French dioceses". In exchange for the relinquishment of ecclesiastical property, "the government will ensure a suitable salary for bishops and parish priests" (Article 14).

However, the Church was subordinate to the government: bishops and priests had to swear an oath of loyalty to the government (Articles 6 and 7); (Note: "I swear and promise to God, on the Holy Gospels, to maintain obedience and fidelity to the government established by the Constitution of the French Republic. I also promise to have no intelligence, to attend no council, to maintain no league, either within or without, which is contrary to public tranquility; and if, in my diocese or elsewhere, I learn that something is being plotted to the prejudice of the State, I will make it known to the government.") they also had to recite the prayer formula "Domine salvam fac Rempublicam; Domine, salvos fac Consules" (Note: "Lord, protect the Republic; Lord, protect the Consuls.") at the end of the Divine Office (Article 8).

An organic law of 18 Germinal An X (April 8, 1802), intended to clarify the terms of the Concordat, further limited the Pope's role by reaffirming Louis XIV 's charter of the Gallican Church and restricting the freedom of movement of bishops, who were forbidden to assemble. Pius VII did not recognize the seventy-seven "organic articles" added to the Concordat, which limited the Pope's power; however, these articles remained in effect until 1905.

The organic articles, which mainly contain measures of civil regulation, nonetheless testify to the Church's subordination to the State: the State has the power to prevent the implementation of bulls or briefs issued by the Pope (Article I), and the Council of State is the last resort in the event of appeal or abuse against a decision by a member of the clergy, whereas the Pope had wanted it to be the bishops (Articles VI-VIII). Bishops also needed government permission to set up seminaries (Articles XI and XXXV), and it was the prefect who supervised the vote on the budget for cults in general and municipal councils (Article XXXIV).

In many respects, the Concordat was more unfavorable to the Church than the Constitution civile du clergé. Essentially, it enabled Napoleon Bonaparte to benefit from the support of the Pope and the Catholic Church, at least until his excommunication in 1806. In 1808, the Pope was imprisoned by Napoleon's army until 1814.

Three titles of the Organic Articles are dedicated to Protestantism. They comprise forty-four articles regulating the organization of the Reformed Churches.

Alsace and Moselle still benefit from the Concordat regime. They were not French in 1905, when the concordat was annulled by the 1905 law on the separation of Church and State.

The Consulate established religious pluralism through a system of recognized cults: Catholic, Protestant Lutheran and Protestant Reformed, as well as Israelite (from 1808). These benefited from certain material advantages, such as the remuneration of their ministers by the State. The other denominations received no recognition whatsoever.

With its relatively liberal vision of religious denominations, the Consulate put an end to the civil and religious wars that had divided the French.

==== Under the Restoration ====
With the fall of Napoleon, the Pope's prestige among French Catholics was significantly elevated, marking the era of ultramontanism (power from beyond the Alps). Politically, it was the advent of the monarchical and religious Restoration, the latest episode in the alliance between the Catholic Church and the French state.

The clergy regained considerable control, imposing processions, banning Sunday balls, and sometimes refusing to administer sacraments to owners of national property. From the start of the Restoration, the Catholic Church was granted more resources, while its influence on education grew. On May 8, 1816, divorce, considered "a revolutionary poison", was abolished.

This alliance between the Catholic Church and the monarchists led to opposition from revolutionary parties, and even to plots to depose King Louis XVIII.

In 1825, under Charles X, the Villèle law made sacrilege and religious profanation punishable by death.

Liberals were concerned by the situation, and were favorably received by the electorate: under the Martignac government, "anticlerical" measures were adopted, such as a drastic reduction in the number of boys admitted to the "petits séminaires", and measures against the Jesuits.

==== Under the Second Republic ====
The February 1848 revolution marked the end of the July monarchy and the birth of the Second Republic. A wind of fraternity blew across France, and it seemed possible to reconcile Christians and Republicans in the name of universal harmony.

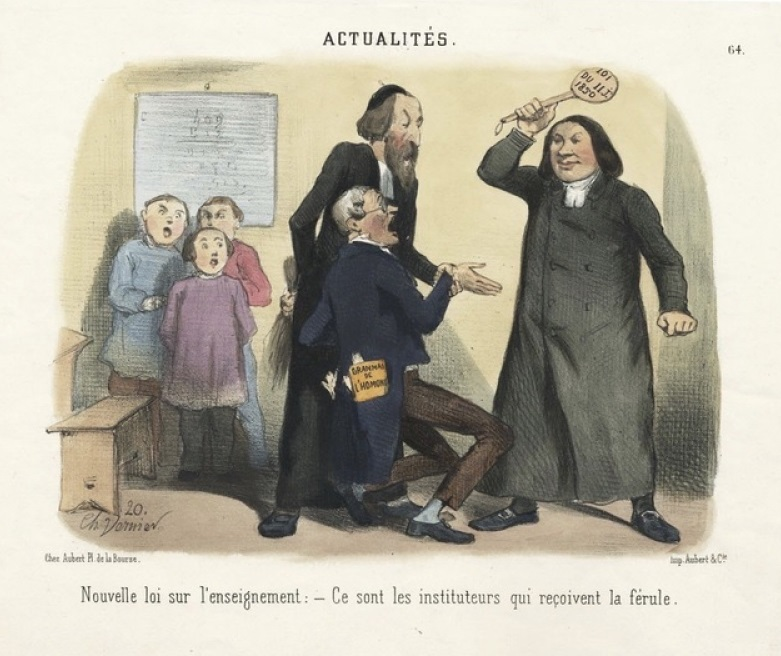
Dressed as clergymen, Alfred de Falloux and Charles de Montalembert are about to club a schoolteacher, cartoon by Charles Vernier, 1850.

After the riots of June 1848, a conservative government came to power. The separation of Church and State, achieved in 1795 and abolished by the Concordat of 1801, was rejected. To bolster the conservative and Catholic electorate, the Minister of Public Instruction, Count Alfred de Falloux, planned to completely reorganize the education system under the pretext of "freedom", only to place it under the control of the Catholic Church. His intentions were sharply denounced by Victor Hugo before the Legislative Assembly, in a speech with secular overtones that was to become a landmark:

Two forms of censorship weigh on thought, political censorship and clerical censorship; one garrotes opinion, the other gags conscience. [...] I declare that I want freedom of education, but I want State supervision, and since I want this supervision to be effective, I want the State to be secular, purely secular, exclusively secular. [...] For my part, I intend to maintain, and if need be make more profound than ever, this ancient and salutary separation of Church and State which was the utopia of our fathers, and this in the interests of the Church as well as the State. [...] I don't want one pulpit to invade the other, I don't want to mix the priest with the teacher. [...] I want the Church to teach inside the church, not outside it. [...] In a word, I want, I repeat, what our fathers wanted: the Church at home and the State at home.

In 1850, the Falloux law finally allowed religious congregations to provide almost half of public primary education. It also obliged teachers to teach catechism and take pupils to mass. Bishops had the right to sit on academy councils, and schools were supervised by the parish priest in conjunction with the mayor. A simple report from the mayor or the parish priest can allow the bishop to transfer a teacher at will.

== The affirmation of secularism - both France ==
In the history of France, the war of the two Frances refers to a long conflict between the supporters of a monarchical, Catholic and conservative France, and the proponents of a secular, republican France anchored in social progress (in the sense of both right-wing liberals and left-wing anarchists). The secular camp of the Third Republic prevailed at the beginning of the 20th century, despite numerous clashes, and subsequently pursued a policy of reconciliation during the First World War.

=== The impulses of modernity ===
==== The encyclical Quanta cura and the Syllabus ====
On December 8, 1864, Pope Pius IX published the encyclical Quanta cura, denouncing the "monstrous errors" of modernist views. Pius IX condemned its representatives in the following terms:

In upholding these rash assertions, they do not think, that they are preaching a freedom of perdition, and that, if human opinions are always allowed to conflict, there will never be a shortage of men who will dare to resist the Truth and put their trust in the verbiage of human wisdom, an extremely harmful vanity which Christian faith and wisdom must carefully avoid.

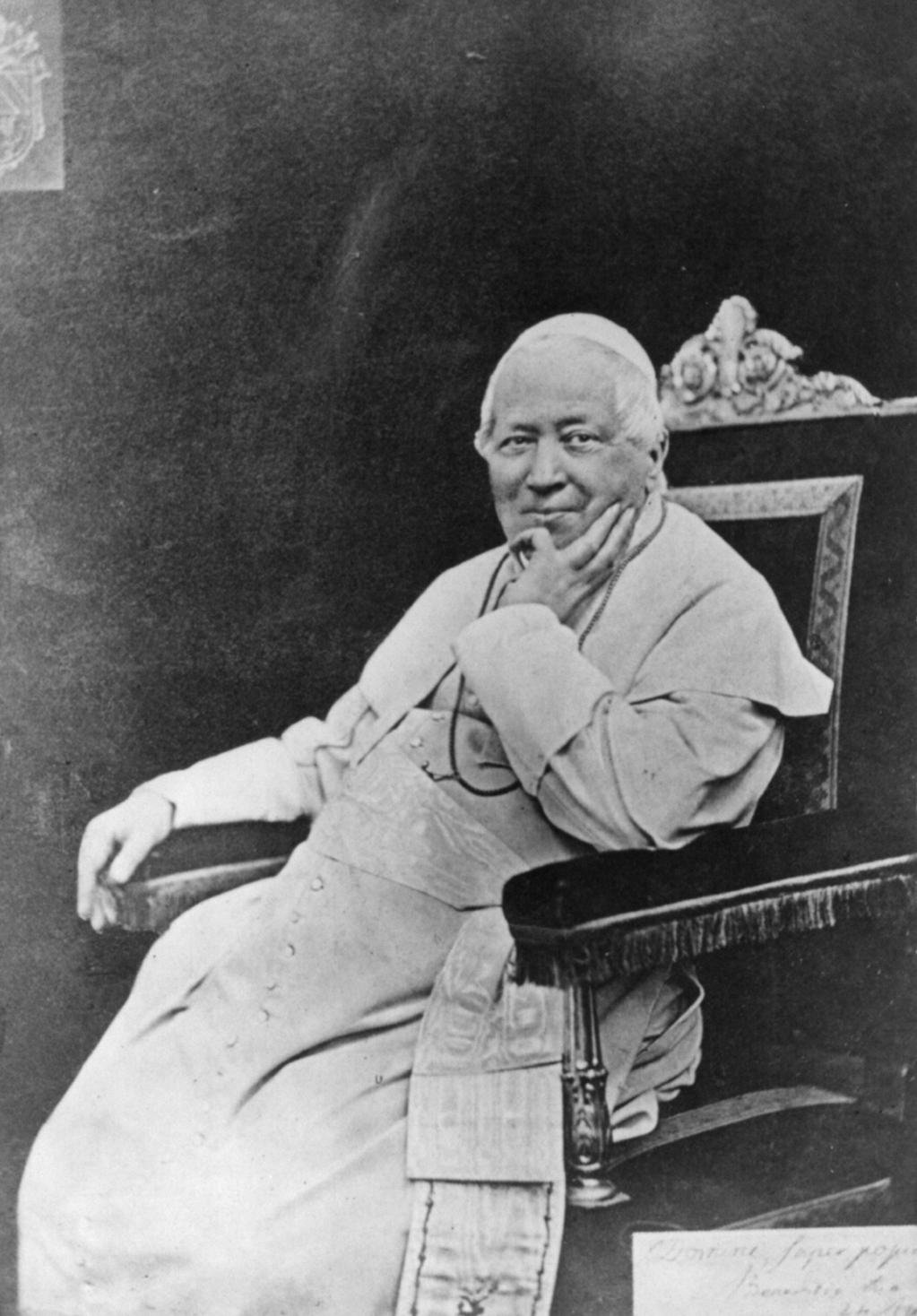
Pius IX, opponent of freedom of conscience

The notions of separation of civil and spiritual powers are described as "heretical principles". The Pope asserts that, conversely, "the power to govern is conferred not for the sole government of this world, but above all for the protection of the Church". This encyclical is accompanied by the Syllabus or Compendium of the principal errors of our time. This document, which condemns the principles of secularism acquired since the French Revolution, states in particular:

Each man is free to embrace and profess the religion he has deemed true according to the light of reason. [...]

The State, as the origin and source of all rights, enjoys a right that is not circumscribed by any limits. [...]

The proper constitution of civil society requires that the popular schools, which are open to all children of every class of the people, and in general that the public institutions intended for letters, higher instruction and the higher education of youth, be freed from all authority of the Church, from all moderating influence and interference on her part, and that they be fully subject to the will of civil and political authority, according to the desire of the rulers and the level of general opinions of the time. [...]

The Church must be separated from the State, and the State from the Church. [...]

Moral laws do not need divine sanction, and it is not at all necessary for human laws to conform to natural law or to receive from God the power to oblige. [...]

Matrimonial causes and engagements, by their very nature, belong to civil jurisdiction. [...]

The circulation of this document triggered a strong anti-clerical movement throughout Europe. The condemnation of liberal Catholicism, freedom of the press and the revolutions of 1830 by the encyclical Mirari Vos gave rise to what came to be known as the modernist crisis among many Catholics, and prompted governments to take retaliatory measures, including the German Kulturkampf (1864) and its Swiss counterpart (1873).

==== The Paris Commune ====
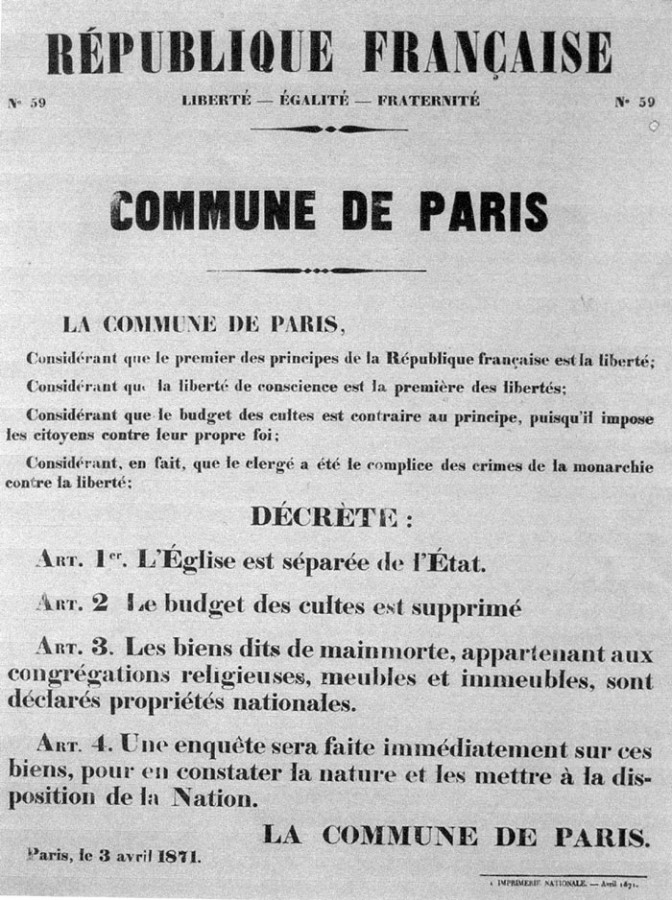
Paris Commune poster

In 1871, the Paris Commune took important steps in favor of secularism - the term appeared for the first time on November 11, 1871 in the newspaper La Patrie - some of which were taken up by the government of the Third Republic. On April 2, the Commune decreed the separation of Church (Catholic) and State, the abolition of the budget for religious services and the secularization of the property of religious congregations.

Édouard Vaillant, in charge of education, plans a reform involving secularization on several levels. He wanted secularized education: denominational teaching was banned and Christian religious symbols were removed from classrooms. He wanted girls and boys to have equal access to education: a commission made up of women was set up on May 21 to consider the education of girls. At the same time, equal treatment for men and women was introduced for teachers and principals. Some arrondissement municipalities made schooling free. The Commune recognized women's political rights.

Utopia ends in bloodshed in May.

==== Secularization and reaction ====
From 1875 onwards, Alfred Naquet introduced several bills regarding divorce, which had been abolished in 1816. The final version of the divorce law was adopted in 1884 and regulated divorce in France for nearly a century.

The French state's reaction to the Catholic Church's position began with the January 1879 elections and the arrival of Jules Grévy as President of the Republic. Significant secular reforms occurred in education, particularly under Jules Ferry. In 1880, the law banning work on Sundays and public holidays was repealed, although it was reinstated a few years later. That same year, Pope Leo XIII finally recognized in his encyclical Diuturnum that those in power could be chosen by the will and judgment of the multitude, without Catholic doctrine standing in the way.

In 1884, the prayers preceding parliamentary sessions were abolished. That same year, Leo XIII called for a rapprochement between Catholics and republicans in his encyclical letter Nobilissima Gallorum Gens, (Note: "The noble French nation") lamenting that France had "forgotten its traditions and its mission".

In a second period, despite Pope Leo XIII's appeals for appeasement, notably in his encyclical Au milieu des sollicitudes, many Catholics became radicalized. This saw the emergence of the anti-Republicanism of Charles Maurras' Action française, and the anti-Dreyfus stance of conservative Catholics.

=== The "hussars" of public schooling ===
At this time of triumphant scientism, republicans, often freethinkers and Freemasons or Protestants, recognized themselves as heirs to the Enlightenment.

Religious congregations, favored in education by the Falloux Law, were seen as socially useless and detrimental to the nation's progress. Léon Gambetta declared:

We must drive back the enemy, clericalism, and bring the layman, the citizen, the scholar, the Frenchman, into our educational establishments, raise schools for him, create teachers, masters.

==== Jules Ferry ====
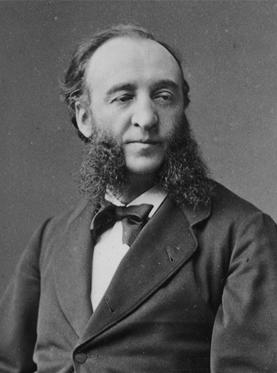
Jules Ferry

In the last quarter of the 19th century, France achieved a notable literacy rate, with 72% of newlyweds able to sign the marriage register. However, still feeling the effects of the defeat in 1870, the leaders of the Third Republic aimed to further enhance education by shaping schools to cultivate good republicans and patriots. Jules Ferry, a lawyer with a passion for public affairs and a sincere republican streak, radically reformed the school system of the Third Republic, making him an emblematic figure of French secularism.

In February 1879, Jules Ferry became Minister of Public Instruction.

On March 29, 1880, he promoted two decrees: the expulsion of Jesuits from France, and the requirement that other congregations apply for authorization within three months, on pain of dissolution and dispersal.

As most congregations decided not to apply for authorization, in solidarity with the Jesuits, the unauthorized congregations (Benedictines, Capuchins, Carmelites, Franciscans, Assumptionists) were expelled. Some Dominican convents were closed; some anti-clerical municipalities also expelled nuns working as nurses in hospitals. As this measure provoked numerous cases of conscience, particularly on the part of those forced to enforce it, there were 200 resignations from public prosecutors' offices (Victor de Marolles), not to mention the resignations of officers, police commissioners and constables; 261 convents were closed and 5643 religious expelled.

In September 1880, Ferry became President of the French Council, and pursued the secularization of society through a reform of public education (1880–1881).

His influence can be seen in the following stages: In February 1880, ecclesiastics were excluded from the Conseil supérieur de l'Instruction publique; in March, Catholic teaching was excluded from university juries and congregations were asked to leave their teaching institutes (Jesuits, Marists, Dominicans, Assumptionists); in December, Camille Sée passed a law creating colleges and lycées for girls; in June 1881, Paul Bert, former Minister of Public Instruction during the brief Gambetta government, reported that primary education was to become free.

In 1882, Jules Ferry was once again Minister of Education. On March 28, the law on compulsory and secular education was passed. Article 4 states that instruction may be given in educational establishments, public or free schools, or in the home. The teaching of religious morality is abolished, in favor of "moral and civic instruction". One day a week, in addition to Sunday, is reserved for catechism classes.

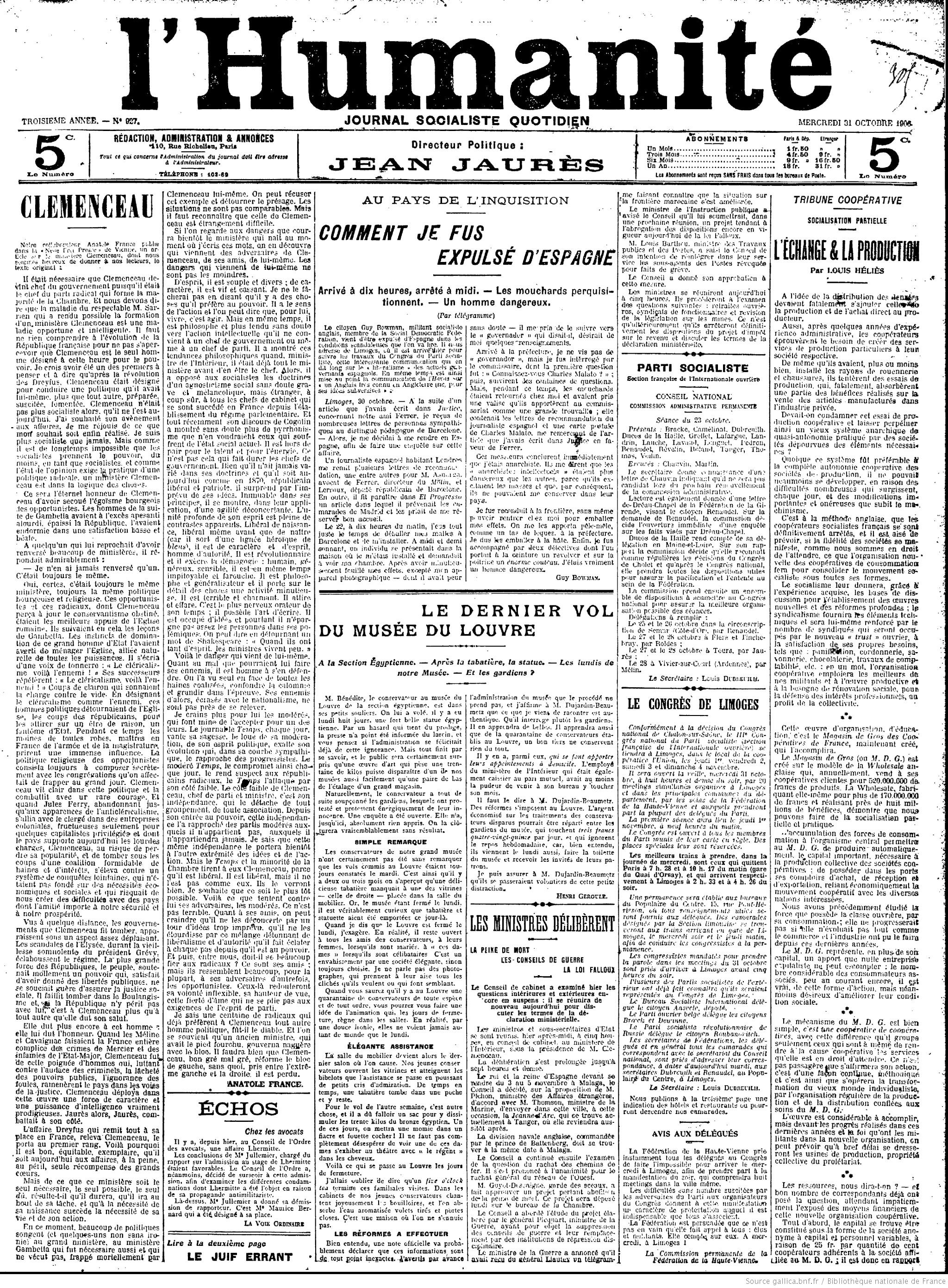
Portrait of Clemenceau by Anatole France in L'Humanité, October 31, 1906, just after his appointment as President of the Council (click on the image repeatedly to read). “Gambetta (...) cried out in an angry voice: “Clericalism, that's the enemy!” (...) Bugle calls that sounded the charge against emptiness (...) The religious policy of the opportunists always consisted in secretly compromising with the congregations they were trying to strike at in broad daylight. (...) And when Jules Ferry, abandoning even the semblance of anticlericalism, allied himself with the clergy in colonial ventures, fruitful only for a few privileged capitalists (...), Clemenceau, at the risk of losing his popularity, spoke out against a system of distant conquests (...)”.

This introduction of secular morality in school textbooks, often written by freethinkers, outraged French Catholics and led to the first textbook war in 1882, when four school books were placed on the Index.

In November 1883, Jules Ferry sent teachers a letter of "recommendations" on the new school system:

The law of March 28 is characterized by two provisions which complement each other without contradicting each other: on the one hand, it excludes from the compulsory curriculum the teaching of any particular dogma; on the other hand, it places moral and civic education in the forefront. Religious instruction belongs to families and the Church, moral instruction to the school. So the legislator did not intend to do something purely negative. Without doubt, its primary aim was to separate the school from the Church, to ensure freedom of conscience for both teachers and pupils, and to distinguish between two domains that had been confused for too long: that of beliefs, which are personal, free and variable, and that of knowledge, which everyone admits is common and indispensable to all. But there's more to the March 28 law: it expresses our determination to found a national education system, and to base it on the notions of duty and right, which the legislator does not hesitate to include among the first truths that no one can ignore. For this vital part of education, the public authorities have counted on you, Sir. By exempting you from religious education, they have not thought of taking away from you what makes your profession so dignified. On the contrary, it seemed only natural that the teacher, at the same time as teaching children to read and write, should also teach them these elementary rules of moral life, which are no less universally accepted than those of language or arithmetic [...] You will never touch with too much scruple that delicate and sacred thing, which is the conscience of the child.

==== Paul Bert ====
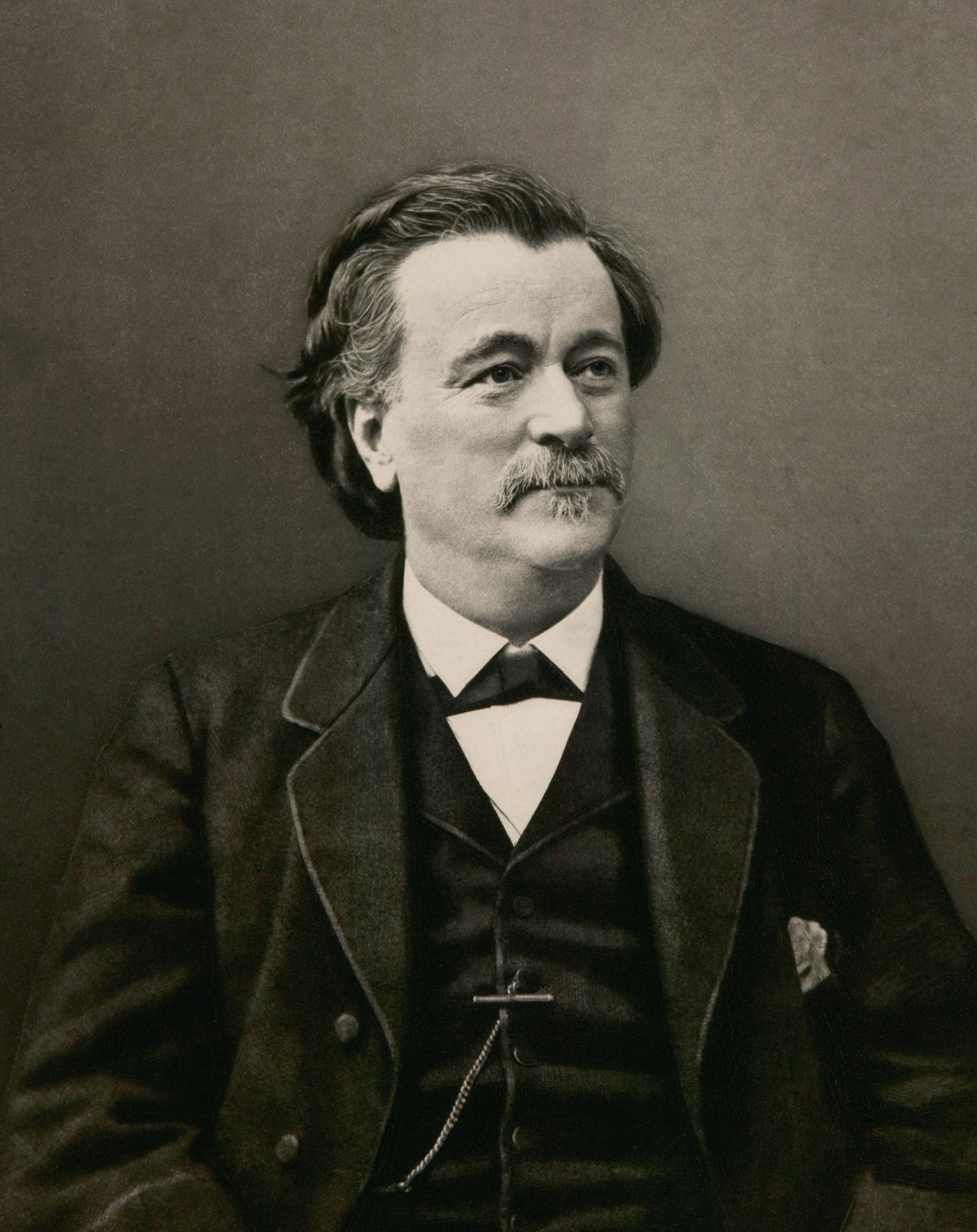
Paul Bert

Along with Jules Ferry, Paul Bert is the founding father of free, secular and compulsory schooling. His law of August 9, 1879 made it compulsory for each département to have two teacher training colleges: one for boys, and one for girls, for teacher trainees. The young masters and mistresses graduating from these establishments would become known as the "black hussars".

A free-thinker, faithful to his motto "Ni dieu, ni maître, à bas la calotte et vive la Sociale", Paul Bert opposed science to religion:

With science, there can be no more superstitions, no more foolish hopes, no more silly credulity, no more belief in miracles, no more anarchy in nature.

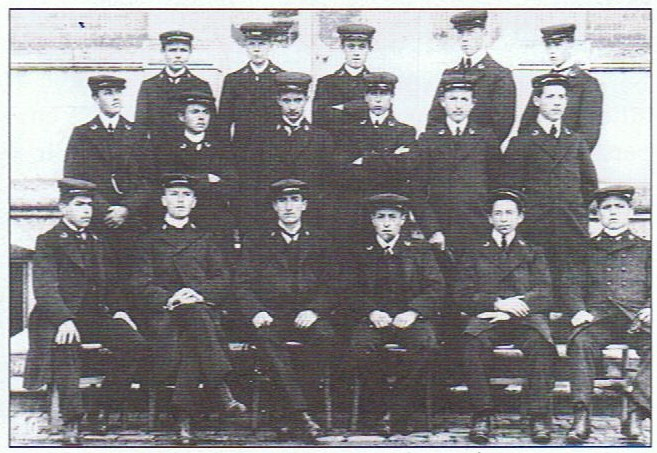
The “hussards noirs" of the 1908-1911 graduating class of the École normale primaire de garçons d'Orléans.

In 1880, as rapporteur for the bill that bears his name, he spoke before the Chamber of Deputies about the principle of secularism (and in particular freedom of conscience) as applied to compulsory primary education:

We are enacting a law which may impose fairly severe penalties on the father of a family, if he does not send his child to school; in the presence of this situation [...] we felt it essential to affirm to the father of the family that nothing will be taught in this school which might infringe on his child's freedom of conscience and his own.

In 1886, he worked alongside Jean Macé on the board of the Ligue de l'enseignement, which campaigned for compulsory, free and secular public education.

==== Ferdinand Buisson ====
Ferdinand Buisson, Director of Primary Education from 1879 to 1896, oversaw the drafting and design of the secular education laws. At the same time, he supervised the editing of a Dictionnaire de pédagogie et d'instruction primaire, for which he himself wrote the article on secularism:

French legislation is the only one to have established the regime of secularism in a logical and complete way: secularism of teaching, secularism of teaching staff.

What do we mean by the secular nature of teaching? We believe that these words should be taken in the sense that first comes to mind, that is, in their most correct and simple meaning: primary education is secular, in that it is no longer confused with religious education.

==== René Goblet ====
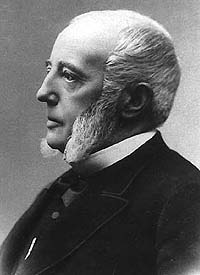
René Goblet photographed by Eugène Pirou

In 1886, the Goblet law (named after René Goblet, then Minister of Public Instruction) prohibited religious figures from teaching in public schools. More generally, it redefined the organization of primary education.

Senator Jean-Baptiste Ferrouillat, presenting the report of the committee that studied the bill to the Senate, outlined the secular foundations of the "reconstruction of education" project:

The law of March 28, 1882 secularized curricula. The current project imposes secularism on teaching staff. It could be said that the first reform called for the second. It's not rational to put religious people in charge of a school where the teaching of religion no longer has a place. How, moreover, can we fail to be struck by the serious disadvantage of retaining teachers who have two superiors, one of whom commands in the name of God, and the other in the name of the State, and who, in the event of conflict between these two authorities, are naturally inclined to submit to their religious superior rather than their civil superior? - Is it not even both illogical and imprudent, on the part of the State, to entrust French youth, in order to give them the notions of civic duties and awaken in them a love of our institutions, to teachers who obey foreign leaders and who are, on principle, hostile to republican institutions and the ideas of modern society?

The Goblet law contains the first explicit reference to secularism in a legal text:

Article 17 - In public schools of all kinds, teaching is entrusted exclusively to secular staff.

=== The law of 1901 ===
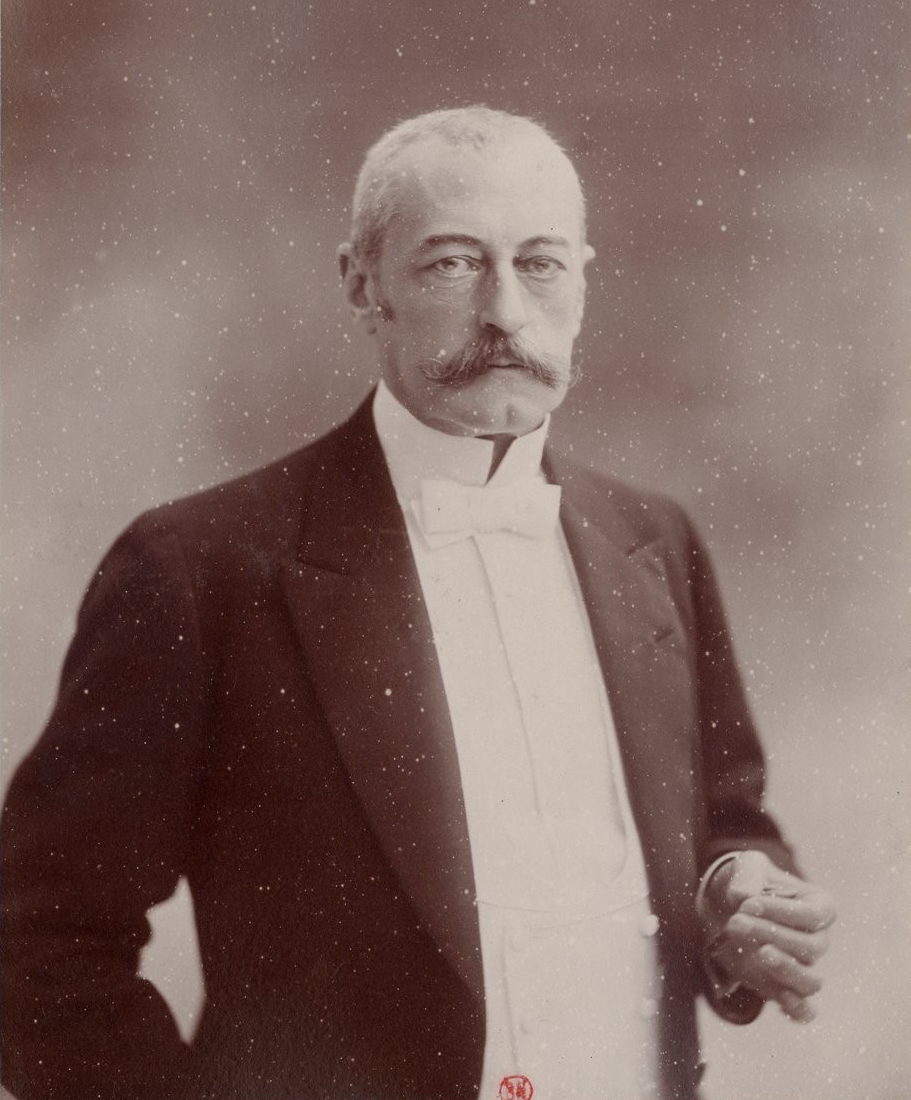
Pierre Waldeck-Rousseau photographed by Nadar.

In 1901, the law on associations (known as the 1901 law, or Waldeck-Rousseau law) authorized the rapid creation of all kinds of associations, provided they were non-denominational. According to Bernard Delpal, Title III of this law is anti-congregational:

Any religious congregation may obtain legal recognition by decree issued with the assent of the Council of State. [In the absence of [...] justification, they are deemed to be dissolved by operation of law [...] The liquidation of assets held by them will take place through the courts.

Of the 160,000 religious men and women, 30,000 chose exile. At the time, there were also Protestant communities of deaconesses which, having never requested authorization, were not obliged to obtain legal recognition. Why attack congregations in this way? According to public law professor Jean-Pierre Machelon:

It was impossible to recognize freedom of association without granting congregations immunities that political leaders could not contemplate accepting. It was also impossible to expect moderate Republicans to exclude congregations from liberalized common law.

In May 1902, with the appointment of Émile Combes as President of the Council, the government took on a strongly anti-clerical stance. Some soldiers rebelled, such as Emmanuel Le Roy Ladurie's grandfather, Commandant Barthélemy-Emmanuel Le Roy Ladurie, who was dismissed by the Conseil de Guerre in August 1902.

=== The laws of 1904 ===
The law of July 5, 1904 prohibited religious congregations from teaching. During the summer of 1904, a series of measures were taken to combat the influence of the Church: the de-naming of streets bearing the name of a saint, the closure of 2,500 religious schools, the systematic promotion of anti-clerical civil servants and the dismissal of Catholics. On July 30, the diplomatic rupture with the Holy See was consummated.

A vast secret investigation was carried out by Minister André, who collected twenty thousand files on the religious practices of senior civil servants and army officers. On November 11, 1904, the Affair of the Cards by the opposition press, and the Combes government was forced to resign.

The law of December 28, 1904 entrusted the communes with the monopoly of external funeral services previously entrusted to the concordat religious congregations.

=== The law of 1905 ===
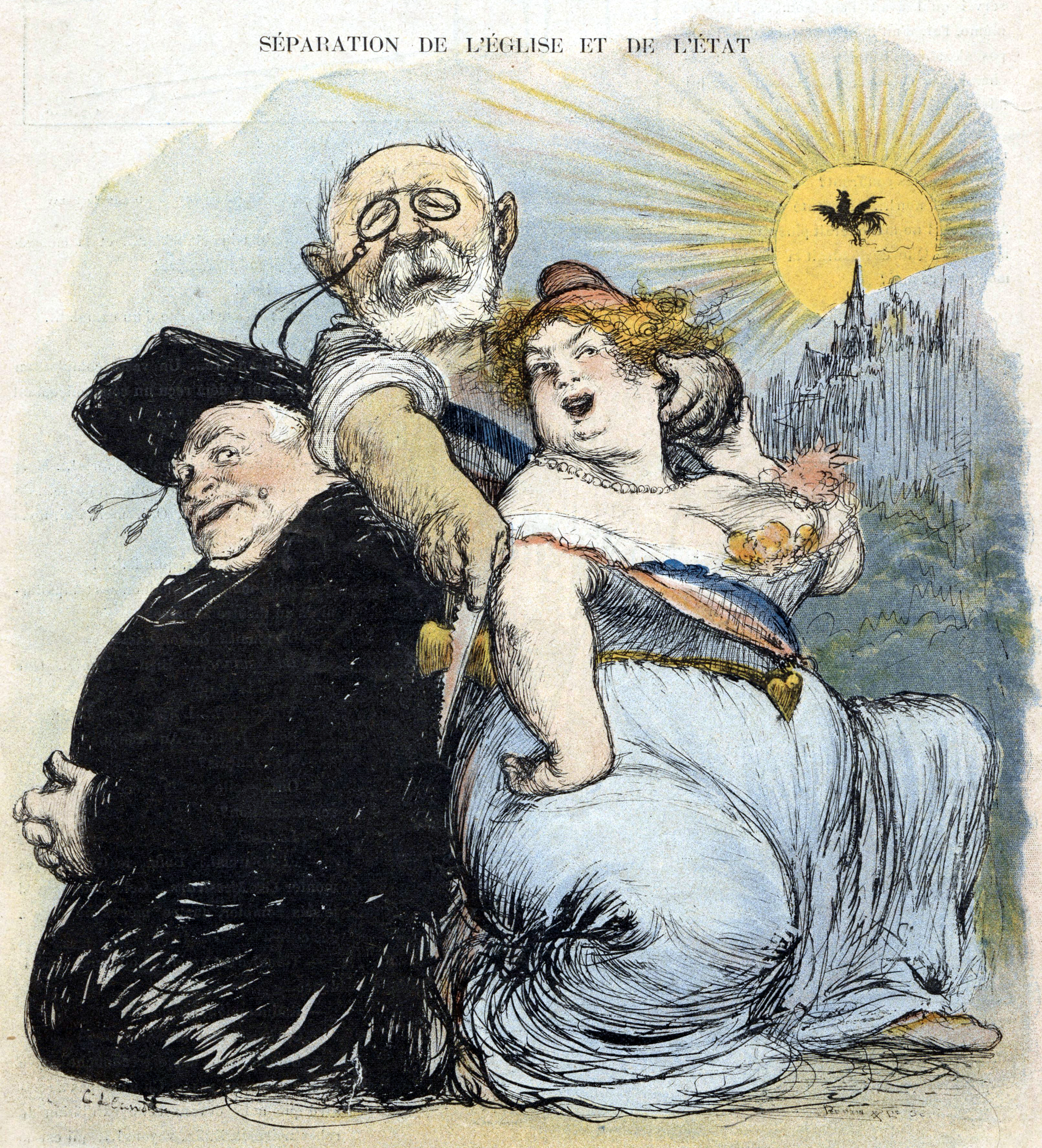
Separation of Church and State, cartoon published in Le Rire, May 20, 1905.

Although it makes no explicit reference to secularism, the law of December 9, 1905 on the separation of Church and State is considered the cornerstone of secular institutions. It establishes the principle of freedom of conscience and the free exercise of religious worship. At the same time, it affirmed secularization by entrusting the State with property confiscated from the Church and abolishing State remuneration of the clergy.

==== The context ====
Supporters of secularism were divided into two camps: the first, in the Jacobin tradition, hoped to eradicate the hold of religion on the public sphere, and promoted a clearly anticlerical (Émile Combes) or even anti-religious (Maurice Allard) policy; the second wanted to affirm the neutrality of the State, on the one hand, and guarantee freedom of conscience for everyone, on the other.

While the former dominated debates right up to the Fiches affair, the 1905 law was the work of personalities from the other camp. But the other side, which wanted to respect freedom of conscience and worship, was equally divided between those who wanted to do so within the framework of abstract republican universalism (Ferdinand Buisson, Georges Clemenceau) and the accommodationists (Jean Jaurès, Francis de Pressensé and above all Aristide Briand). It was the latter who pushed through Article 4, of Anglo-Saxon origin, which handed over churches to those "who conform to the general rules of the cult whose exercise they propose to ensure" (which, indirectly, respects the hierarchical organization of the Catholic Church).

Intended as a law of appeasement, the Separation Act was designed to put an end to more than twenty-five years of tension between the Catholic Church and the Republic.

==== The text ====
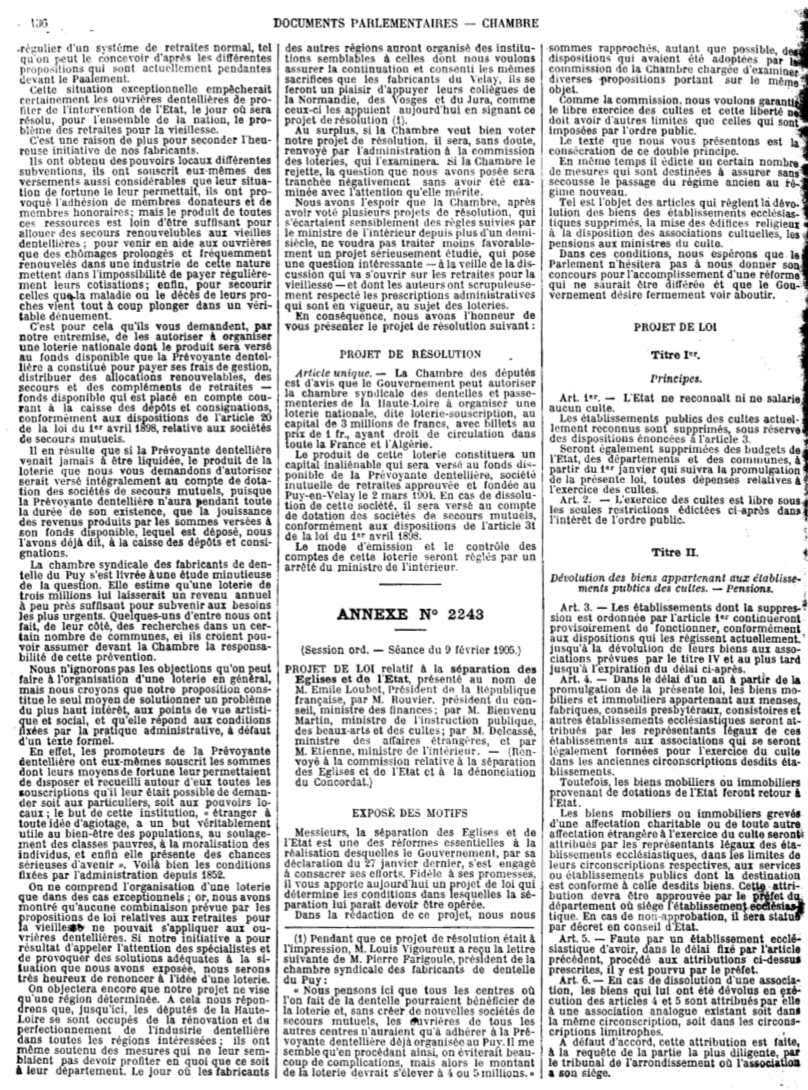
Front page of the bill on the separation of Church and State - 1905

Article 1 of the law recalls article 10 of the 1789 (Note: "No one should be disturbed for his opinions, even religious ones, provided that their expression does not disturb the public order established by law.") Declaration of the Rights of Man and of the Citizen:

The Republic guarantees freedom of conscience. It guarantees the free exercise of religion, subject only to the restrictions hereinafter laid down in the interests of public order.

With regard to freedom of conscience, the State remains the guarantor of everyone's freedom to practice the religion they wish (or none at all), as long as this practice respects public order. It is in this spirit that certain liberal provisions are laid down, which are decried by the most radical secularists, such as the free provision of religious buildings by communes, or the creation of chaplaincies in barracks, lycées, prisons, hospitals, etc. With regard to religious worship, Article 2 stipulates that:

The Republic does not recognize, salute or subsidize any religion.

Thus, in the eyes of the Republic, Catholicism loses its former pre-eminence over other religions - and some will criticize secularism for its lack of recognition of the nation's "Christian roots".

On the other hand, more confidential religions and spiritualities find themselves on an equal footing with the main religious currents, the word "cult" being taken here in the common sense of "religion".

The State also relinquishes all control over the organization of churches and religions, but in return requires the formation of religious associations at commune level, which will be the exclusive interlocutors of the Republic. More generally, the public authorities were forbidden to intervene, positively or negatively, in religious matters, marking a major break with the previous concordat regime.

From a financial point of view, the law appears restrictive for the churches: religious associations may not carry out charitable activities, nor may they teach, which deprives them of an important source of income. What's more, they cannot accept donations or legacies. They must maintain and manage places of worship confiscated by the State and made available to them free of charge. Finally, ministers of religion are no longer salaried by the State.

==== The consequences ====
The law puts an end to the tradition, dating back to Clovis, of "France as the eldest daughter of the Church". It was therefore welcomed by anti-clericals, as illustrated by René Viviani 's address to the House:

All together, by our fathers and our elders, by ourselves, we have attached ourselves in the past to a work of anticlericalism, to a work of irreligion. We have torn human consciences away from belief. When a wretch, tired of the weight of the day, bent his knees, we lifted him up, we told him that behind the clouds there were only chimeras. Together, and with a magnificent gesture, we extinguished lights in the sky that will never be relit. This is our work, our revolutionary work. Do you think the work is finished? On the contrary, it's just begun.

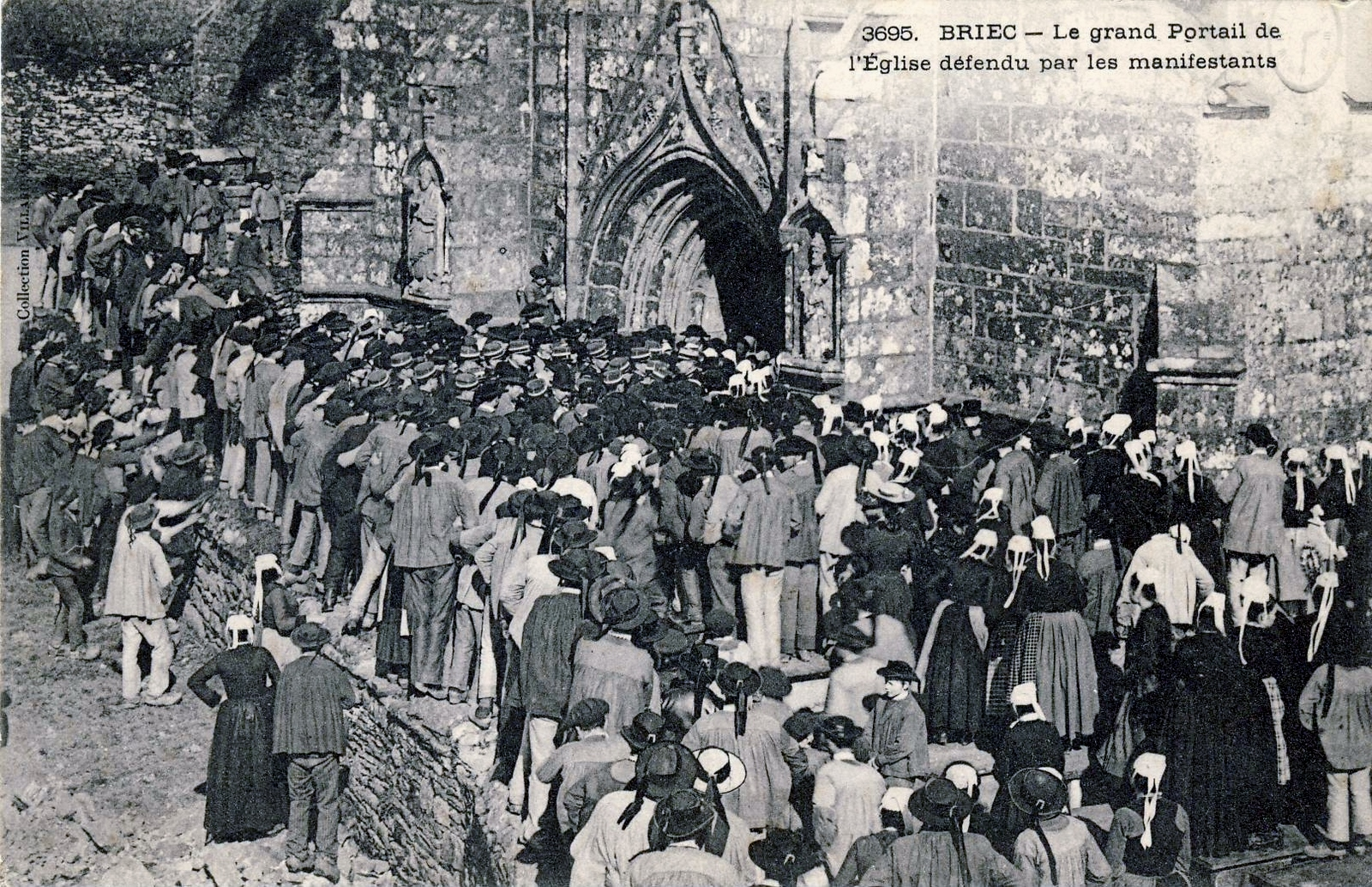
The Inventory quarrel in Briec: demonstrators attempt to prevent the inventorying of the church (1906).

Generally well received by Jews and Protestants (including Wilfred Monod), the law was opposed by Pope Pius X, notably in his encyclical Vehementer Nos:

That it is necessary to separate the State from the Church is an absolutely false thesis, a very pernicious error. Based, in fact, on the principle that the State must not recognize any religious cult, it is first of all very gravely injurious to God. [...] We owe him, therefore, not only a private cult, but a public and social cult, to honor him.

Catholic faithful (sometimes outside the Church, such as Action Française in Paris) and ecclesiastics sometimes violently opposed the 1906 inventories, which could be carried out, according to Patrick Cabanel, "with a petty zeal". When Georges Clemenceau became President of the French Council, he quickly decided to carry out inventories only where resistance was not expected. In January and March 1907, two new laws were passed under the aegis of Aristide Briand, then Minister of Religious Affairs, to avoid creating a "mass crime", despite the refusal of many Catholics to apply the law.

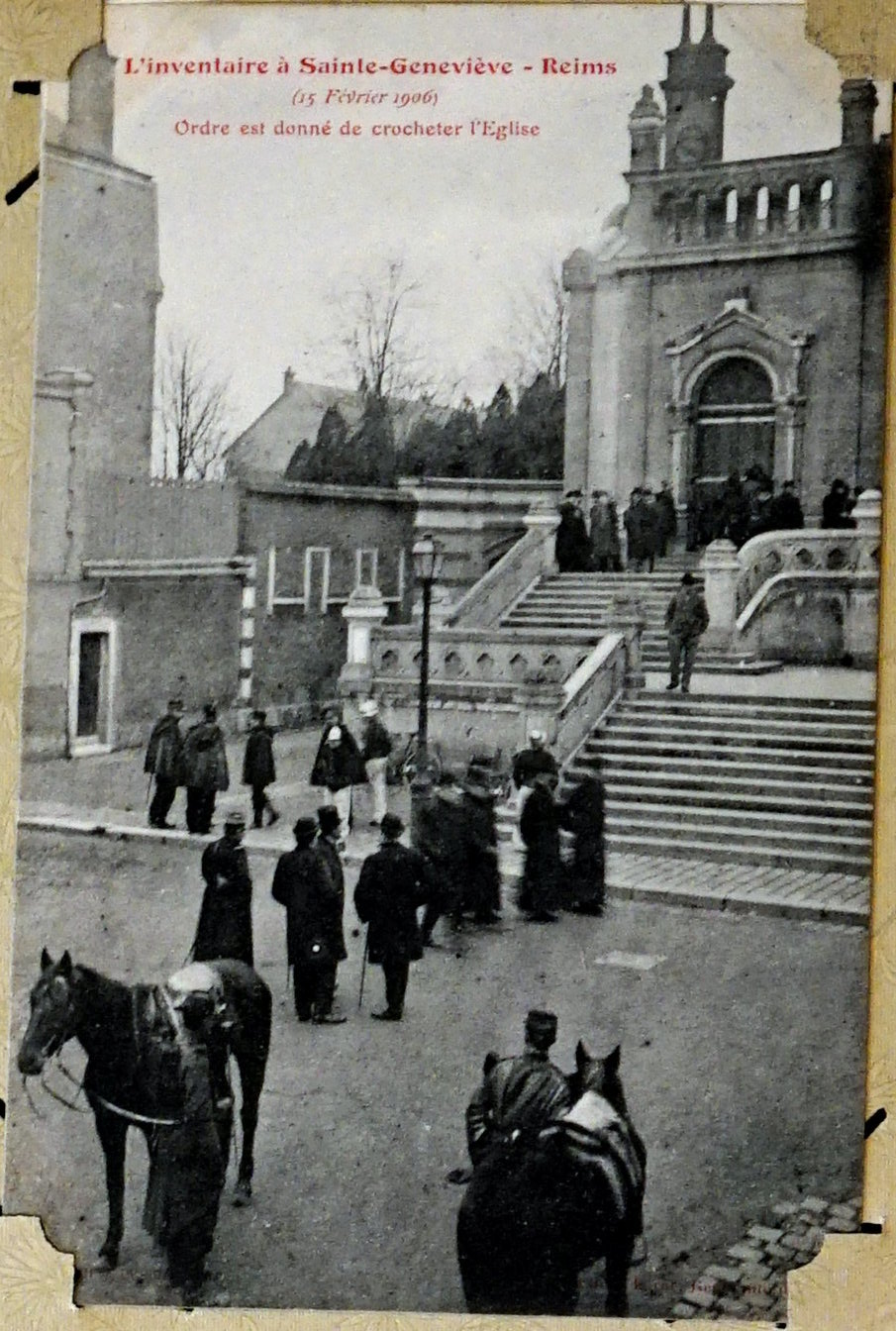
The Inventories quarrel at Sainte-Geneviève church in Reims: the building is ordered to be crocheted (1906).

From the point of view of strict secularism, religious associations can be perceived as having a special status that transcends the general associative framework, thereby providing advantages to religious groups. These associations benefit from specific tax privileges, including exemptions related to donations and bequests. Such advantages were viewed by political figures across the spectrum as inconsistent with the spirit of the law. For instance, Jean Jacques of the Radical Party cited Jules Méline from the Moderate Right, who argued that "religious associations [were] going to become the headquarters of the Catholic party".

In August 1906, Pope Pius X issued his encyclical Gravissimo officii munere, (Note: "A very serious obligation on our part) forbidding the faithful to create religious associations. In it, he asserted that it was "absolutely impossible to create religious associations without violating the sacred rights affecting the very life of the Church". (Note: The principle of communal religious association, with disputes settled by administrative justice, underpins a Presbyterian type of Church organization (government of the faithful) in opposition to the Episcopalian organization (government of the bishop) of Catholicism.) Bishop Louis Duchesne referred to this encyclical as Digitus in Oculo ("finger in the eye"), indicating that some members of the French clergy and laity had accepted the principles of secularism. The Pope's opposition to French law culminated in 1907 with the transfer of presbyteries, seminaries, and episcopal palaces to state ownership.

In the end, the refusal to create associations, which led to the State taking over the upkeep of churches, was very advantageous for the Catholic Church - paradoxically, Protestants who had accepted the law were less favored.

Taking advantage of religious freedom and the new liberties granted to them by the 1905 law, two hundred Catholic religious associations developed in Gallican communities already at odds with the Roman hierarchy. They grouped and organized themselves within the Ligue des catholiques de France, then the Secrétariat des associations cultuelles catholiques, and were aggressively opposed by Catholics loyal to Rome. Under the pretext of restoring public order, the churches that had been entrusted to the Gallican clergy were gradually withdrawn. With no support from the state, which wanted to avoid creating a schismatic church, the movement slowly disintegrated. Gallican Catholicism would only survive in places where the faithful had the means to build their own churches.

Appeasement came in 1924, when the government agreed to authorize the creation of diocesan associations subject to the authority of the bishop. On July 8, 1941, a law allowed religious associations to collect donations and bequests, subject to administrative authorization. This provision marked the end of the episcopate's contestation of the law.

In the long term, the 1905 law was recognized as generally beneficial to the Catholic Church, since it removed one of its main criticisms: its uncontrollable financial power. In addition, ministers of religion, and bishops in particular, gained greater independence from the administration. Finally, the way in which administrative authorizations were granted, and the quasi-monopoly on the use of religious buildings, enabled the Church to limit the emergence of competing religious denominations.

==== Exceptions to the 1905 law ====
===== Alsace-Moselle =====
Alsace and Moselle were not French at the time of the law's promulgation, and are still under the Concordat regime.

This element of Alsatian and Moselle customary law recognizes and organizes the Catholic, Lutheran, Reformed and Jewish faiths. The four recognized religious denominations are administered by public religious establishments that are self-financing, with expenses covered by contributions from the faithful. However, local authorities are required to provide housing for ministers of religion, to cover any budget shortfalls of the public establishment and to contribute to the financing of construction or major repairs to places of worship. Ministers of religion are salaried by the State, but do not have civil servant status.

The Bishops of Strasbourg and Metz and the President of the Protestant Church of the Augsburg Confession of Alsace and Lorraine are appointed by the Head of State. The elected lay members of the Israelite consistories in the three départements must be approved by the Prime Minister.

This derogation from the constitutional principle of secularism provoked contradictory reactions. Sociologist Jean Baubérot, an advocate of "inclusive secularism", sees it as a "bridgehead from which to adapt France to Europe". For Joseph Doré, former Archbishop of Strasbourg, the concordat system of Alsace-Moselle could "constitute a model for the whole of France". In contrast, according to philosopher Henri Peña-Ruiz: "The concordat logic, which reproduces all the ambiguities of the Gallican posture, is the antithesis of secularism". For Alain Bauer, then Grand Master of the Grand Orient de France, the 1905 law must be applied throughout France; consequently, "Alsace-Moselle should be included in the general system of religious denominations".

Nevertheless, following an opinion issued by the Observatoire de laïcité on May 12, 2015, a number of notable changes have been made, particularly with regard to schools. In addition, following the same opinion from the Observatoire de laïcité, the offense of blasphemy, which in theory still applied in Alsace-Moselle, was repealed.

===== Other territories =====
Other French territories have a special regime.

The islands of Wallis and Futuna are subject to the former regime; the Catholic Church is officially responsible for education there.

In Mayotte, in the Comoros archipelago, with its predominantly Muslim population, the main religious authority (the mufti) is appointed by the prefect, who also appoints judges (qadis). The latter are responsible for applying current Muslim law in matters of personal status. According to the principles of the "organization of indigenous justice", Sharia (Islamic law) is applied according to the collection of jurisprudence (the minhadj); although local customary law is moving towards common law.

In French Guiana, the system of religious worship dating back to the reign of Charles X recognizes only the Catholic faith. Priests, and only priests, are financed by the département.

This was also the case for Muslim worship in French Algeria prior to the country's independence in 1962, when a decree of September 27, 1907 provided for the implementation of the 1905 law in Algeria, but failed to take effect. The construction of the Grande Mosquée de Paris in 1920 was financed by the State.

== Since 1945: constitutional secularism ==
After being called into question under the Vichy regime (which favored Catholic education, recognized congregations and subsidized private schools), the secular nature of the State was affirmed in the 1946 and 1958 Constitutions. The legislative corpus also pursued the secularization of society, notably in education, family policy, gender equity and other areas.

Henceforth, the republican foundation of secularism is defined by these principles:

Freedom of conscience, since the State does not persecute any religion; equality in law of these religions, which obliges it to treat them all in the same way; and finally, the neutrality of political power, which refrains from any interference in spiritual affairs, just as it intends that the Churches should refrain from claiming temporal power, particularly in matters of education.

Since the Constitutional Act of August 4, 1995, secularism no longer comes under Article 2 of the Constitution, but under Article 1, which is far from without consequences.

Article 1 - France is an indivisible, secular, democratic and social Republic. It ensures the equality of all citizens before the law, without distinction of origin, race or religion. It respects all beliefs.

As a result, the architecture of the Constitution and the way it is read have changed. According to Geneviève Koubi:

Article 1 is not located in a specific title; it precedes Title 1 - Of Sovereignty. It oversees the reading of the constitutional text. Consequently, all the institutions of the Republic must meet the characteristics of a secular state, starting with the President of the Republic, since his arbitration ensures the regular functioning of the public authorities.

The French Republic is secular, and the epithets "indivisible, democratic and social" presented in Article 1 only give rise to debate in the context of their application: the concretization of the text of norms that is the Constitution then engages discussion on the scope of the adjective secular, which has often been the fulcrum of social debate. It has been the subject of numerous interpretations, and some authors believe that this qualifier merely indicates a formal historical continuity of the Republic, without being an attribute of it. Others, such as Louis de Naurois, a former professor at the Institut Catholique de Toulouse, believe that secularism is made up of two simple ideas: political power is secularized, and religious activity is relegated to the private sphere.

For the Constitutional Council, Article 1 of the Constitution contains the "principle of uniqueness" of the French people; its principles "preclude the recognition of collective rights for any group whatsoever, defined by a community of origin, culture, language or belief".

A combined interpretation of Articles 1 and 89 of the Constitution would see secularism as consubstantial with "the republican form of government [which] cannot be revised". This formula was borrowed from the Third Republic. (Note: In fact, article 2 of the law of August 14, 1884, partially revising the constitutional laws, added the following to article 8 of the law of February 25, 1875 on the organization of public powers: "The republican form of government cannot be the subject of a proposal for revision". It should also be noted that the Constitution of October 27, 1946 already confirmed the republican ideology of the French political system, since Article 95 repeated word for word the provisions of the amended Article 8 of the law of February 25, 1875.) The wording of the 1958 Constitution is radical, especially as the Constitutional Council has set limits on constituent power. Any attempt to alter its secular character would therefore be tantamount to altering the very substance of the Republic.

Moreover, normative production and control procedures are subject to an understanding of the principle of secularism, the source of a rule of constitutional law. Secularism is therefore an attribute of both the law and the Republic, making them inseparable from each other. For Robert Badinter, "the Republic is secular, which means that secularism is republican".

Contemporary applications of secularism in France can be found in Secularism in France.

== See also ==
- Religious education
- Religion in France
- History of education in France
- Freemasonry in the French Third Republic

== Bibliography ==
=== General literature ===
- Baubérot, Jean (2003). Histoire de la laïcité en France. Vol. 3571. PUF. ISBN 978-2-13-055912-2.
- Kintzler, Catherine (2007). Qu'est-ce que la laïcité ?. Vrin. ISBN 978-2-7116-1876-7.
- Miqueu, Christophe (2017). Comprendre la laïcité. Paris: Max Milo.
- Henri Peña : Histoire de la laïcité, genèse d'un idéal. Paris: Éditions Gallimard. 2005. ISBN 2-07-030038-2. and La Laïcité — textes choisis et présentés. GF Flammarion. 2003. ISBN 978-2-08-073067-1.
- Cadène, Nicolas (2016). La laïcité pour les Nuls (réédition complétée 2017 ed.). Éditions First.
- Sève, René (2005). La Laïcité. Vol. 48. Dalloz. ISBN 978-2-247-05949-2.

=== Especialized literature ===
- Albertini, Pierre (2006). L'École en France, du xixe siècle à nos jours, de la maternelle à l'université. Paris: Hachette. ISBN 2-01-016398-2.
- Baubérot, Jean (1997). La Morale laïque contre l'ordre moral. Éditions du Seuil. ISBN 978-2-02-025151-8.
- Cabanel, Patrick (2003). Le Dieu de la République — Aux sources protestantes de la laïcité (1860–1900). Rennes: Presses universitaires de Rennes. ISBN 2-86847-806-9.
- Delahaye, Christian (2014). La laïcité à l'hôpital - fondements historiques,enjeux interreligieux et défis théologiques de la nouvelle laïcité à l'hôpital. Parole et Silence. ISBN 978-2-88918-325-8.
- Djavann, Chahdortt (2003). Bas les voiles !. Paris: Éditions Gallimard. ISBN 2-07-073534-6.
- Pierre Joxe: L'Édit de Nantes, une histoire pour aujourd'hui. Hachette littérature. 1998. ISBN 978-2-01-235337-4. and L'Édit de Nantes, réflexions pour un pluralisme religieux. Hachette littérature. 2004. ISBN 978-2-01-279228-9.
- Ozouf, Mona (1992). L'École, l'Église et la République 1871-1914. Paris: Seuil. ISBN 978-2-02-096244-5.
- Weill, Georges (2004) [1925]. Histoire de l'idée laïque en France au xixe siècle. Paris: Hachette. ISBN 978-2-01-279220-3.

=== Documents and articles ===
- "Rapports annuels 2013-2014 et 2014-2015 de l'Observatoire de la laïcité auprès du Premier ministre". La Documentation française. 2014.
- "Rapports annuels 2013-2014 et 2014-2015 de l'Observatoire de la laïcité auprès du Premier ministre". La Documentation française. 2015.
- Bellon, Christophe; Chanet, Jean-François; Lalouette, Jacqueline. "Laïcité, séparation, sécularisation (1905–2005)". Vingtième Siècle — Revue d'histoire.
- Machelon, Jean-Pierre (2006). Les Relations des cultes avec les pouvoirs publics.
- Peña-Ruiz, Henri (2006). "Culture, cultures, et laïcité". Hommes et Migrations (1259).
