= Ecojesuit =

International religious communication platform for ecological issues

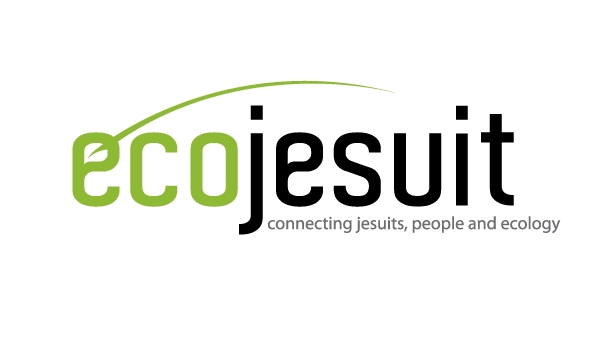
- Formation: July 2010
- Founder: Society of Jesus
- Headquarters: Rue Cornet 51
- Location: Brussels, Belgium
- Coordinates: 50.837696°N 4.384334°E
- Fields: Ecology
- Official language: English, French, Spanish
- Parent organization: Jesuit European Social Centre
- Website: Ecojesuit.com

Ecojesuit is an international communication platform for ecological issues created by the Society of Jesus. It was launched in 2010 and publishes its work primarily online.

== History ==
In November 2010, the Jesuits launched the first Ecojesuit newsletter. They created Ecojesuit after their 35th General Congregation and a document Healing a Broken World that came from it. The newsletter was about ecological issues around the world and edited by the Jesuit European Social Centre (JESC) in Brussels, and the Environmental Science for Social Change (ESSC) in Manila. The number of subscribers increased steadily up to reach over 1,100 by September 2011. Due to the uptake, from February 2012 the newsletter was produced more frequently going from a monthly to a fortnightly publication.

It is run from the same building as the Jesuit European Social Centre in Brussels, and is supported by Global Ignatian Advocacy Network (GIAN) and works with the Ignatian Solidarity Network and CIDSE.

In 2009, Ecojesuit attended the 2009 United Nations Climate Change Conference in Copenhagen, the Rio+20 Earth Summit in 2012, the unveiling of World Water Day at the United Nations in 2013 as part of a series on the Millennium Development Goals. In 2018, it called on all Jesuit institutions to divest from fossil fuels. In 2019, it attended the 2019 United Nations Climate Change Conference.
