= Ignatian Solidarity Network =

Coordinates: 41°29′19.94″N 81°31′58.84″W

- Abbreviation: ISN
- Predecessor: Ignatian Family Teach-in
- Established: 2004; 22 years ago
- Headquarters: 1 John Carroll Blvd. University Heights, Ohio
- Director: Christopher Kerr
- Affiliations: Jesuit, Catholic
- Staff: Twelve
- Website: ISN

The Ignatian Solidarity Network (ISN) is a U.S.-based Catholic social justice education and advocacy organization grounded in Catholic social teaching and the spirituality of St. Ignatius of Loyola. Founded in 2004, ISN works with individuals, schools, parishes, and partner organizations to promote faith-informed engagement on issues such as immigration, economic justice, racial equity, peacebuilding, and care for creation.

ISN serves as a national network connecting Catholic educational institutions, faith communities, and social justice organizations across the United States and Canada. Its work emphasizes formation, collaboration, and collective action, with a particular focus on young adults and students within the Ignatian tradition. ISN works with people of all ages, but has a particularly affinity for programming and social justice mobilization of youth and young adults.

== History ==
The Ignatian Solidarity Network was established in 2004 in response to growing interest within Jesuit and Ignatian communities for coordinated social justice education and advocacy in the United States. It emerged from collaboration among Jesuit institutions, educators, and lay leaders seeking to connect faith formation with action for justice in contemporary social and political contexts.

The founding of the Ignatian Solidarity Network was influenced in part by the 1989 murders at the Universidad Centroamericana José Simeón Cañas (UCA) in El Salvador, during the Salvadoran Civil War, in which six Jesuit priests and two lay women were killed by members of the Salvadoran Army. This event drew international attention to the Jesuits' advocacy for peace, justice, and human dignity, and helped shape renewed commitments within the Jesuit and broader Catholic community to social justice education and advocacy. The network's emphasis on training and advocacy for social justice is understood as part of this broader legacy of Ignatian witness and engagement.

Since its founding, ISN has expanded from a small convening initiative into a national organization with a permanent staff, a governing board of directors, and partnerships with more than 100 Catholic institutions and organizations.

== Programs and activities ==
ISN is best known for organizing the Ignatian Family Teach-In for Justice, the largest annual Catholic social justice gathering in the United States. Held each year in Washington, D.C., the event brings together students, educators, clergy, and advocates for keynote addresses, workshops, prayer, and legislative advocacy on Capitol Hill.

In addition to the Teach-In, ISN develops educational resources and initiatives that support justice formation across the lifespan. These include programs focused on immigration advocacy, environmental sustainability inspired by Laudato Si, ethical economic practices, and accompaniment of marginalized communities. ISN also coordinates national campaigns and days of action in collaboration with Catholic and interfaith partners.

Through its Education for Justice initiative, ISN publishes articles, prayers, lesson plans, and multimedia resources used by educators and faith leaders in classrooms, parishes, and community settings. Education for Justice was founded in 2001 by the now defunct Center of Concern.

== Mission and approach ==
The Ignatian Solidarity Network frames its work through Ignatian spirituality, emphasizing discernment, reflection, and action. Its mission centers on forming people of faith who are committed to justice, solidarity with marginalized communities, and care for the common good. ISN integrates theological reflection with public engagement, seeking to bridge faith, education, and advocacy.

== Organization ==
ISN is a lay-led nonprofit organization headquartered in the United States. It is governed by a board of directors and supported through individual donations, foundation grants, and institutional partnerships.
