= Jesuit European Social Centre =

Belgian research and documentation center

Coordinates: 48°35′13.19″N 7°44′41.88″E

- Abbreviation: JESC
- Established: 1956; 70 years ago
- Location(s): Rue du Cornet; Brussels, Belgium
- Affiliations: Jesuit, Catholic
- Website: jesc.eu
- Formerly called: Catholic Office of Information and Initiative for Europe (OCIPE)

Jesuit European Social Centre (JESC), formerly known as Catholic Office of Information and Initiative for Europe (OCIPE) is a research and documentation center on ethics and European integration founded in 1956.

== History ==
In 1956, the Jesuits founded the "Catholic Office for Information on European Issues" (OCIPE) in Strasbourg. It was situated on Rue de la Toussaint in the city and its purpose has been to establish a research and documentation centre on European issues. Although centred in Strasbourg, it also had offices in Brussels, Budapest, and Warsaw.

In January 2012, OCIPE underwent a restructuring. Its office in Brussels became the Jesuit European Social Centre (JESC). Its offices in Budapest and Warsaw became centres in their own right. Eventually, the office in Strasbourg also closed.

JESC continues the work of OCIPE as well as working with COMECE, CIDSE and the Chapel for Europe. In 2017, with help from the German Bishops' Conference, it began the European Leadership Programme. The programme was inspired by Pope Francis' speech 'Re-thinking Europe' and trains participants from all over the world over 5 months, in Brussels, while working for European organisations.

== Bibliography ==
- Marc Feix, Diocesan Delegate for European Affairs, "The creation of OCIPE in Strasbourg," 14 December 2006 on the occasion of the celebration of the 50th anniversary of OCIPE.
- Henri Madelin, "Conference on the occasion of 50 years of OCIPE."
- Jean Schlick, "Civil Association and Association of Church problems of dual membership," Legal Praxis and Religion, 2, 1985, pp. 248–265.

== See also ==
- Commission of the Bishops' Conferences of the European Community (COMECE)
- Ecojesuit
- List of Jesuit sites in Belgium
