= Henri Madelin =

French priest (1936–2020)

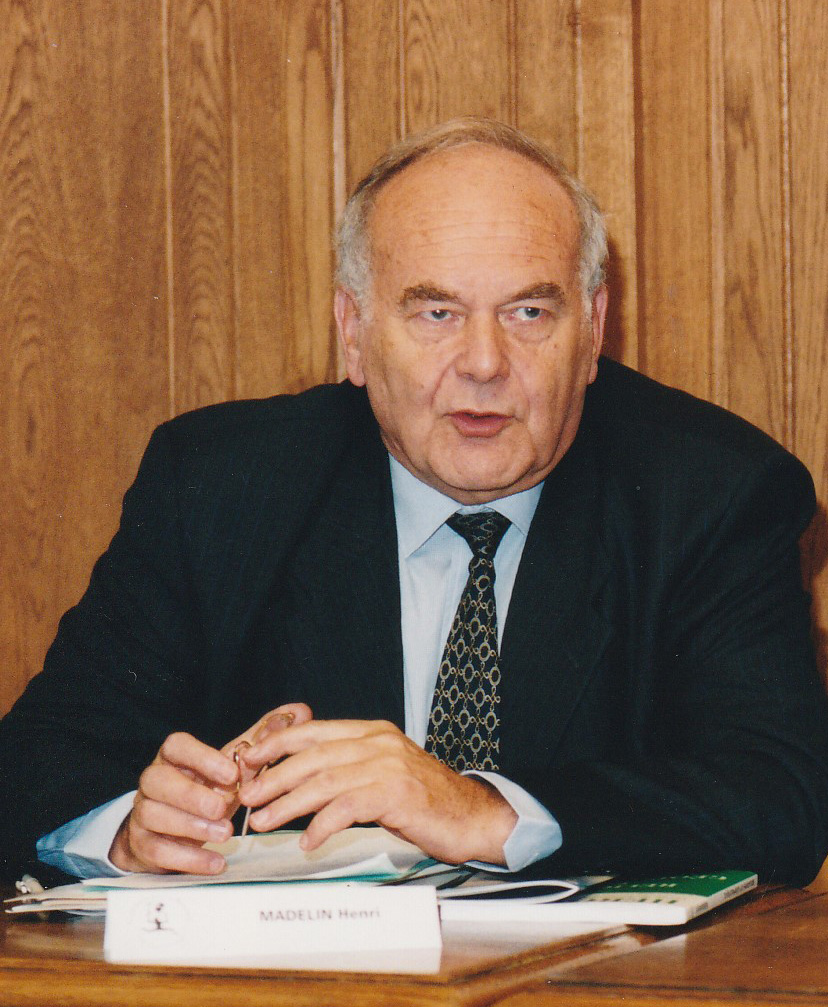
- Born: 26 April 1936; Guebwiller, France
- Died: 8 April 2020 (aged 83); Lille, France
- Occupations: Priest; Theologian

Henri Madelin (26 April 1936 – 8 April 2020) was a French Jesuit priest and theologian.

== Biography ==
Madelin was born on 26 April 1936 in a family of nine children.

His family moved to Blois in 1939, where Madelin practiced scouting.

After studying philosophy at the Jesuit formation in Vals-près-le-Puy, two years at Collège Libermann in Douala, and studying theology in Fourvière, Madelin was ordained a priest of the Society of Jesus in 1967.

In 1973, Madelin became director of Action populaire, which became the Center for Research and Social Action (CERAS). After earning a doctorate in political science, he chaired the Centre Sèvres in Paris from 1985 to 1991, when he was appointed national chaplain of the Mouvement chrétien des cadres et dirigeants.

Madelin succeeded Jean-Yves Calvez as editor-in-chief of the Catholic journal Études. He worked as a lecturer at Sciences Po, and was a member of the Catholic Office of Information and Initiative for Europe. He also taught at the Institut Catholique de Paris.

Henri Madelin died on 8 April 2020 in Lille at the age of 83 during the pandemic due to COVID-19.

== Publications ==
- Politique et foi (1972)
- Pétrole et politique en Méditerranée occidentale (1973)
- La Chine pour nous (1974)
- Les chrétiens entrent en politique (1975)
- Chrétiens et marxistes dans la société française (1977)
- La foi chrétienne à l'épreuve du marxisme (1978)
- En marge les chrétiens ? Point de vue sur la marginalisation des chrétiens en France (1979)
- Socialismes et chrétiens en Europe (1979)
- World Catholicism in transition (1988)
- La Menace idéologique (1989)
- Pluralité des religions et État laïque
- Nouveaux enjeux de la laïcité. Laïcité et débats aujourd'hui (1990)
- Quand la charité se fait politique (1991)
- L'Occident : christianisme et modernité (1991)
- Dieu et César, Essai sur les démocraties occidentales (1994)
- Sous le soleil de Dieu, Entretiens avec Yves de Gentil-Baichis (1996)
- Une encyclique tardive sur l'Holocauste : La repentance contestée du Vatican (1998)
- L’Évangile social, Guide pour une lecture des encycliques sociales (1999)
- La Société dans les encycliques de Jean-Paul II (2000)
- Jeunes sans rivages (2001)
- Si tu crois, L'Originalité chrétienne (2004)
- Refaire l'Europe. Le vieux et le neuf (2007)
- L'Europe dans tous ses états (2007)
- Ainsi fait-il (2013)
- Heurs et malheurs de l'autorité (2018)
