= Second Ordinary General Assembly of the Synod of Bishops =

The 1971 Synod of Bishops (Sep 30 — Nov 6) was the second ordinary general assembly in the history of the Synod of Bishops. Its agenda consisted of two subjects: Ministerial Priesthood and Justice in the World. In response, they presented an eight-point plan for global action and suggested that local churches promote ecumenical cooperation and education in the area of justice. Most of the 210 Synod Fathers supported Pope Paul VI's stand on clerical celibacy, there was a sizable opposition.

Presidents Delegate

H. Em. Card. Léon Étienne Duval, Archbishop of Alger (Algeria)

H. Em. Card. Pablo Muñoz Vega, S.I., Archbishop of Quito (Ecuador)

H. Em. Card. John Joseph Wright, Prefect of the Sacred Congregation for the Clergy (Vatican)

Secretary General

H.E. Most. Rev. Mons. Władisław Rubin, Tit. Bishop of Serta (Vatican)

General Relators

H. Em. Card. Joseph Höffner, Archbishop of Köln (Germany)

H. Em. Card. Vicente Enrique y Tarancón, Archbishop of Toledo (Spain)

H. Em. Card. Teopisto Alberto y Valderrama, Archbishop of Cáceres (Philippines)

Special Secretaries

H.E. Most. Rev. Mons. Ramón Torrella Cascante [es], Tit. Bishop of Minervino Murge, President of the Consilium de laicis and of the Pontifical Commission Iustitia et Pax(Vatican)

Rev. Mons. Jorge Arturo Medina Estévez, Professor in theology at the Catholic University of Santiago del Cile (Chile) and Member of the International Theological Commission (Vatican)

Rev. Mons. Alberto Bovone, Head of Department at the Sacred Congregation for the Clergy (Vatican)
