= Justice in the World =

"Justice in the World" is the document produced by the 1971 Synod of Bishops, dealing with the issue of justice and liberation of the poor and oppressed. It called for more countries to share their power and for wealthy nations to consume less. It makes up a part of official Catholic social teaching. It was written by many bishops from poor, undeveloped countries and was influenced by liberation theology. They wrote that justice is central to the Catholic church's mission and that "Christian love of neighbour and justice cannot be separated" and that "Action on behalf of justice and participation in the transformation of the world fully appear to us as a constitutive dimension of the preaching of the Gospel, or, in other words, of the Church's mission for the redemption of the human race and its liberation from every oppressive situation."
