= Ricky D. Gibbs =

US Army brigadier general

Rick Gibbs
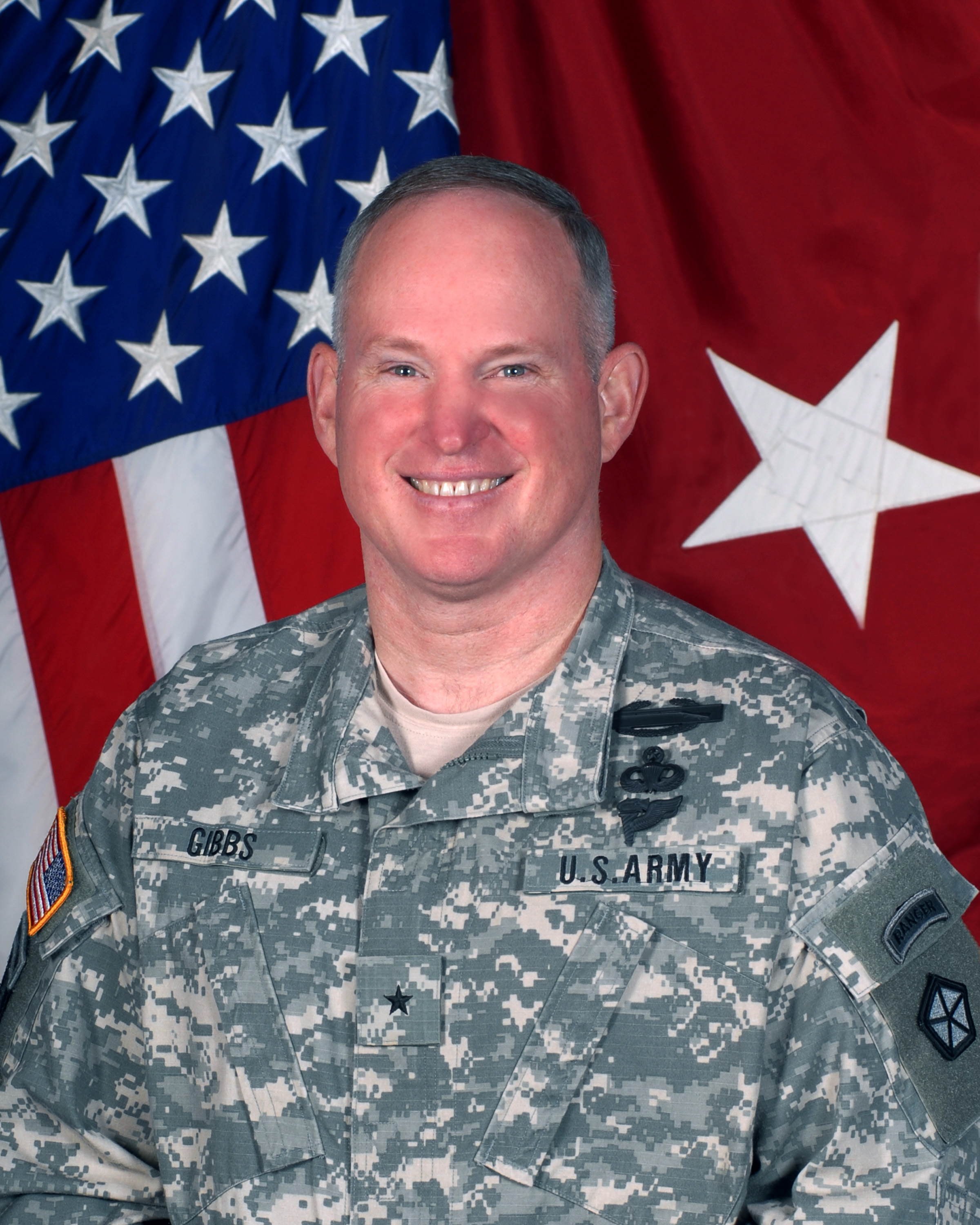
- Gibbs while deputy commander of V Corps in 2011
- Born: Ricky Dan Gibbs; 1960 (age 65–66); Austin, Texas, US
- Education: University of Texas at Arlington; Troy State University; United States Army Command and General Staff College; United States Army War College
- Spouse: Nolly Chess (m. 1987)
- Children: 2
- Military career
- Service: United States Army
- Service years: 1982–2013
- Rank: Brigadier General
- Unit: U.S. Army Infantry Branch
- Commands: Company C, 2nd Battalion, 187th Infantry Regiment; Headquarters and Headquarters Company, 3rd Brigade, 101st Airborne Division; 1st Battalion, 327th Infantry Regiment; 4th Brigade Combat Team, 1st Infantry Division; V Corps
- Wars: Gulf War; Iraq War
- Awards: Bronze Star Medal (4); Defense Meritorious Service Medal; Meritorious Service Medal (7); Complete List
- Other work: Strategic planning consultant

Rick Gibbs (born 1960) is a retired United States Army officer. A 1982 graduate of the University of Texas at Arlington, he served from 1982 until 2013 and attained the rank of brigadier general. He served in both the Gulf War and Iraq War, and his awards included four awards of the Bronze Star Medal, the Defense Meritorious Service Medal, and seven awards of the Meritorious Service Medal. Gibbs' command assignments included: Company C, 2nd Battalion, 187th Infantry Regiment; Headquarters and Headquarters Company, 3rd Brigade, 101st Airborne Division; 1st Battalion, 327th Infantry Regiment; 4th Brigade Combat Team, 1st Infantry Division; and V Corps.

A native of Austin, Texas, Gibbs was raised on army bases as his family traveled for his stepfather's military career. He graduated from Fort Campbell High School in 1978, then attended the University of Texas at Arlington, from which he graduated in 1982. He later earned a master's degree from Troy State University. Gibbs participated in the Reserve Officers' Training Corps while in college, and after graduating he received his commission as a second lieutenant in the U.S. Army Infantry Branch. He completed professional education including Airborne School, Ranger School, Air Assault School, Jumpmaster School, Pathfinder School, and the Reconnaissance and Surveillance Leaders Course.

Gibbs carried out staff and command assignments of increasing rank and responsibility during his career, including deployment for the Gulf War and the Iraq War. His command postings included a battalion and a brigade. While serving as deputy commander of V Corps beginning in 2011, he also served for several months as the acting corps commander. Gibbs retired as a brigadier general in 2013. In retirement, he resided in Harker Heights, Texas and operated a strategic planning and consulting business, RDG Consulting.

== Early life ==
Ricky D. Gibbs was born in Austin, Texas in 1960, a son of Billy (or Billie) Park Gibbs and Dorothy Jean McVey. His mother later married United States Army noncommissioned officer David Marks; Gibbs was raised and educated on army bases, and he graduated from Fort Campbell High School in 1978. He played football for Fort Campbell High and in 2013 he was inducted into the school's Marshall Patterson Athletic Hall of Fame. He attended the University of Texas at Arlington from 1978 to 1982, where he was a member of the corps of cadets and commanded the corps during his senior year. He graduated with a Bachelor of Arts degree in Physical Education and subsequently earned a Master of Science degree in Management from Troy State University. In 2011, The University of Texas at Arlington inducted Gibbs into its Military Science Hall of Honor.

== Start of career ==
While in college, Gibbs participated in the Reserve Officers' Training Corps, which he completed as a Distinguished Military Graduate. After graduating, he received his commission in the United States Army as a second lieutenant of Infantry. His initial assignments included rifle platoon leader, scout platoon leader, and company executive officer with 3rd Battalion, 28th Infantry Regiment in Germany. After returning to the United States, he served at Fort Benning, Georgia as a rifle platoon leader with 3rd Battalion, 75th Ranger Regiment and branch chief of the Airborne and Ranger Training Brigade's Long Range Surveillance School.

=== Military education ===
Gibbs' professional education includes:

- Infantry Officer Basic Course
- Airborne School
- Ranger School
- Air Assault School
- Jumpmaster School
- Pathfinder School
- Reconnaissance and Surveillance Leaders Course
- Infantry Officer Advanced Course
- Combined Arms and Services Staff School
- Command and General Staff College
- Army War College (Master of Strategic Studies degree, 2004)

== Continued career ==
Following graduation from the Infantry Officer Advanced Course, Gibbs was assigned to the 101st Airborne Division at Fort Campbell, Kentucky, where he commanded Company C, 2nd Battalion, 187th Infantry Regiment, served as a brigade assistant operations officer (Assistant S-3), and was assigned as aide-de-camp to the division commander during the Gulf War. Gibbs also commanded Headquarters and Headquarters Company, 3rd Brigade, 101st Airborne Division.

After Operations Desert Shield/Desert Storm, Gibbs was assigned as chief of personnel and training for the Combat Training Center Directorate at Fort Leavenworth's, Combined Arms Command. After completing the course at the United States Army Command and General Staff College, he was assigned as a battalion operations officer (S-3) for a unit of the 82nd Airborne Division at Fort Bragg, North Carolina. In August 1995, he was assigned to the operations staff (G-3) of the XVIII Airborne Corps as chief of joint exercises for United States Atlantic Command. From July 1996 to May 1998, he served as aide-de-camp to the commanding general of Fifth U.S. Army at Fort Sam Houston, Texas. He later served on the Joint Staff as a joint ground maneuver program analyst in the Land and Littoral Warfare Assessment Division.

== Later career ==
Gibbs next served as commander of 1st Battalion, 327th Infantry Regiment, a unit of the 101st Airborne Division. His next posting was to the division staff as deputy chief of staff for operations (G-3), which included deployment to Iraq during the Iraq War. He then attended the United States Army War College, after which he was assigned as a strategic planner for the army staff. This was followed by postings as director of the army staff's Office of Institutional Army Adaptation and chief of its Army Initiatives Group.

From July 2005 to February 2007, Gibbs commanded 4th Brigade Combat Team, 1st Infantry Division, including combat in Iraq during the Baghdad troop surge. He served as the 1st ID's chief of staff from February 2007 to June 2009, when he was assigned as assistant division commander for maneuver. Gibbs was promoted to brigadier general in December 2009. From 2011 until retiring in 2013, Gibbs was assigned as deputy commander of V Corps, and he was the acting corps commander from June 2011 to January 2012.

After his military retirement, Gibbs became a resident of Harker Heights, Texas and operated a strategic planning and consulting firm, RDG Consulting. Among his projects was a 2016 report on the impact proposed force reductions at Fort Hood would have on the city of Killeen, Texas.

== Awards ==
Gibbs' awards include:

- Bronze Star Medal with 3 oak leaf clusters
- Defense Meritorious Service Medal
- Meritorious Service Medal with 1 silver and 1 bronze oak leaf cluster
- Air Medal
- Joint Service Commendation Medal
- Army Commendation Medal with 1 silver and 2 bronze oak leaf clusters
- Army Achievement Medal
- National Defense Service Medal with 1 bronze service star
- Southwest Asia Service Medal with 3 bronze service stars
- Global War on Terrorism Expeditionary Medal
- Global War on Terrorism Service Medal
- Kuwait Liberation Medal (Saudi Arabia)
- Kuwait Liberation Medal
- Combat Infantryman Badge
- Expert Infantryman Badge
- Master Parachutist Badge
- Air Assault Badge
- Ranger Tab
- Pathfinder Badge
- Joint Staff Identification Badge
- Army Staff Identification Badge
- Valorous Unit Award
- Joint Meritorious Unit Award

=== Additional honors ===
In May 2002, Gibbs received the Order of Saint Maurice (Centurion) from the National Infantry Association.
