= Kristoffer Domeij =

United States Army soldier (1982–2011)

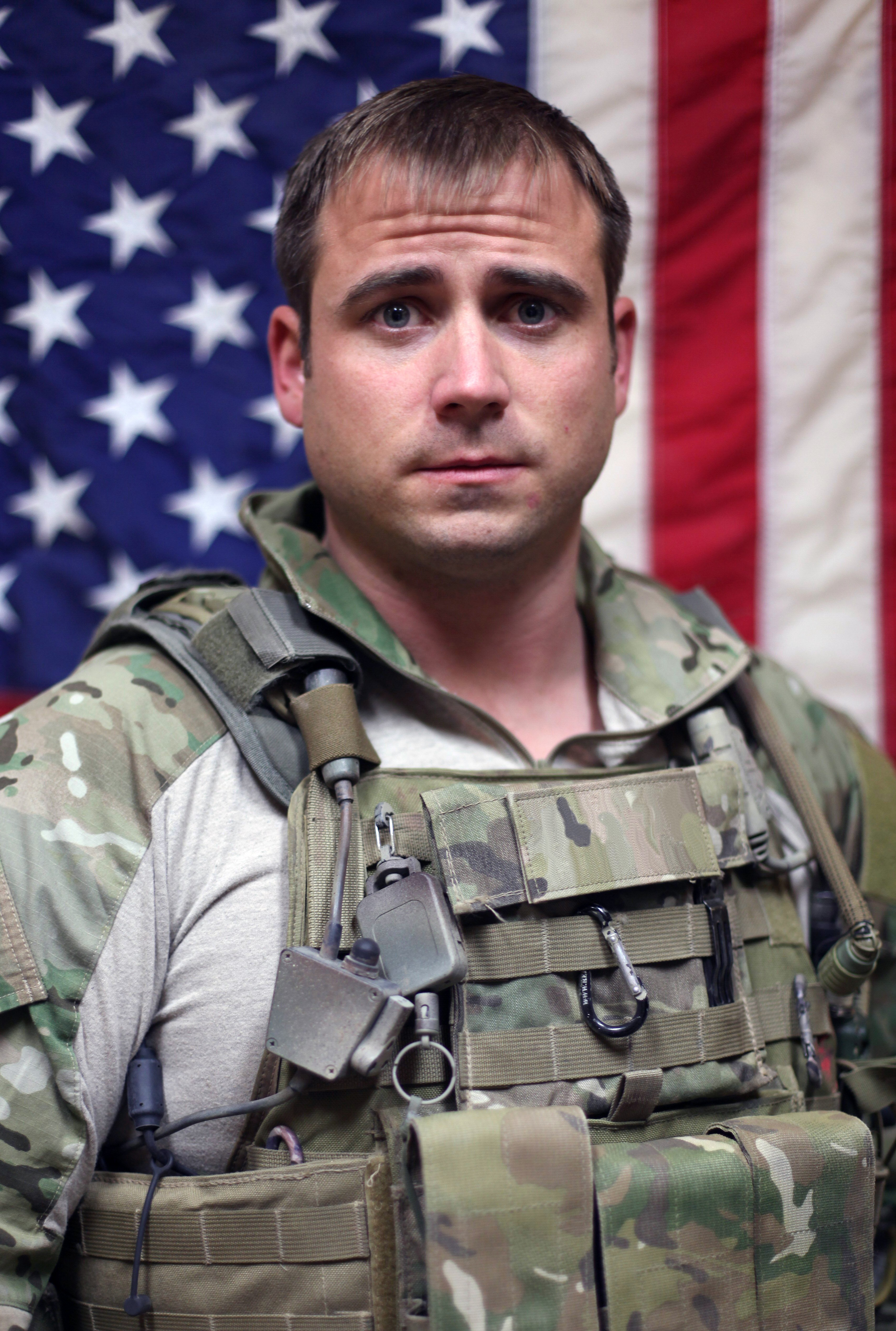
- Born: Kristoffer Bryan Domeij; October 5, 1982; Santa Ana, California, US
- Died: October 22, 2011 (aged 29); Kandahar Province, Afghanistan
- Burial place: Woodlawn Cemetery in Lacey, Washington
- Children: 2
- Military career
- Allegiance: United States
- Branch: US Army
- Service years: 2001–2011
- Rank: Sergeant First Class
- Units: 2nd Ranger Battalion; 75th Ranger Regiment
- Conflicts: Iraq War; War in Afghanistan †

Kristoffer Bryan Domeij (October 5, 1982 – October 22, 2011) was a United States Army soldier who is recognized as the U.S. soldier with the most deployments to be killed in action; at the time of his death he was on his fourteenth deployment. Over ten years he had served four deployments in Iraq and at least nine in Afghanistan; he trained as a Joint Terminal Attack Controller and was recognized as epitomizing the Ranger motto "Rangers lead the way". (Note: 'while Domeij may have rotated to the conflict zones 14 times in the last 10 years, it does not necessarily mean he was actively fighting for a vast majority of the last decade. It does, however, mean that there are probably few other soldiers who have seen more combat for the U.S. military in recent years.') After a distinguished and highly decorated career, he was killed by a roadside improvised explosive device, along with two other Rangers, in Kandahar Province in Afghanistan. The Joint Fires Observer classroom building at Fort Sill is named in his honor. A film was made in his memory.

== Early life and education ==
Born in Santa Ana, California, he graduated from Rancho Bernardo High School in 2001 and enlisted in the U.S. Army in July 2001.

== Career ==
After graduating from the Ranger Indoctrination Program (RIP), Domeij was assigned to C Company, 2nd Battalion, 75th Ranger Regiment in 2002 where he served as a Forward Observer. In 2003, he was one of the soldiers who helped rescue Private First Class Jessica Lynch in Iraq. He later served in 2nd Battalion's Headquarters and Headquarters Company as a Joint Terminal Attack Controller (one of the first Rangers to be so qualified), in B Company as the Fires Support Noncommissioned Officer, and again in HHC as the Battalion Fires Support Noncommissioned Officer; these were ordinarily positions "reserved for Air Force airmen who serve with ground combat units and call in airstrikes from fighters or bombers flying overhead". (Note: Colonel Mark W. Odom, commander of the 75th Ranger Regiment, Odom offered a succinct testimonial saying that Domeij was "the prototypical special operations NCO", a "veteran of a decade of deployments to both Iraq and Afghanistan and hundreds of combat missions", whose abilities as a JTAC "made him a game changer on the battlefield—an operator who in real terms had the value of an entire strike force on the battlefield". Echoing that sentiment, battalion commander Lieutenant Colonel David Hodne said: "This was a Ranger you wanted at your side when the chips were down... He is irreplaceable - in our formation and in our hearts". Hodne also said, "He was one of those men who [was] known by all as much for his humor, enthusiasm and loyal friendship as he was for his unparalleled skill and bravery under fire".)

His military education included "Basic Airborne Course, the Ranger Assessment and Selection Program, the Warrior Leader’s Course, the Advanced Leader’s Course, the Senior Leader’s Course, U.S. Army Ranger Course, Jumpmaster School, Pathfinder School, Joint Firepower Control Course, and Joint Fires Observer Course". He served for ten years.

With 14 deployments, Domeij is the US soldier with the most deployments to be killed in action. The previous highest total was 12. For Rangers, tours are a "constant churn" of combat missions; a Ranger battalion typically conducts "400 - 500 missions during a combat deployment". During Domeij's many deployments, he was often involved in "ferocious, close-quarters fighting". A commenter to Mother Jones noted:

"... as members of the SPECOPS community, Rangers handle their deployments differently from regular Army and Marine line units. By his estimation, Sgt. 1st Class Domeij likely spent closer to four or more years in the war zones, not including pre- and post-deployment training. And as our reader points out, it’s not just the time you do, but what you do in that time: The 75th Ranger Regiment typically deploys on 105-day deployments, i.e. a little longer than three months. What they lack in calendar length is made up in intensity: they typically conduct an operation every single night of their deployments with few exceptions. That someone has been deployed 14 times is mortifying and sad, especially in this case".

Several have commented that Domeij's willingness to selflessly serve his country may be transcended by the question "whether this country is abusing its fit young people’s sense of commitment".

Domeij was one of three soldiers killed by a roadside bomb near Kandahar Province on October 22, 2011. Lieutenant Ashley White, 24, a cultural support specialist, and Pvt. 1st Class Christopher Horns, 20, who was on his first tour, were killed in the same attack. Reflecting on the diversity of the three, a former Ranger commented, "A young line Ranger on his first deployment, a seasoned [leadership] Ranger on his 14th and a female Officer as part of the overall assault force. Things have certainly taken a turn for the surreal".

Domeij, however, disliked being in the spotlight and wouldn't have wanted "any media coverage" if anything ever happened to him. His former football coach, Jeff Carpenter, remarked that Domeij would have felt bothered by the attention, as "he felt he was a guy doing his job".

== Legacy ==
In 2019, Devin Graham filmed HERE AM I, SEND ME, a documentary of his visit to Normandy alongside two teams: one made up of Domeij's 75th Ranger comrades with his mother Scoti Domeij, the second consisting of retired Special Operations Forces soldiers with their families. The film recorded their parachute jumps, alongside other attendees, from WWII C-47 Skytrains to commemorate the 75th anniversary of D-Day. Domeij's team, including Scoti, made their jump especially to honor Kristoffer's life and sacrifice. The forty minute film debuted on YouTube on Veterans Day 2019 and went on to be screened at film festivals worldwide. (Note: At the "American Cemetery and Memorial on the bluffs overlooking Omaha Beach. Rangers, Green Berets, family, and friends sipped a Belgian blonde beer called Tyrant-22, named for Kristoffer’s call sign, and watched the magic of C-47 Skytrains taking off into the partly cloudy skies over France".)

Domeij has also been honored in several memorials:

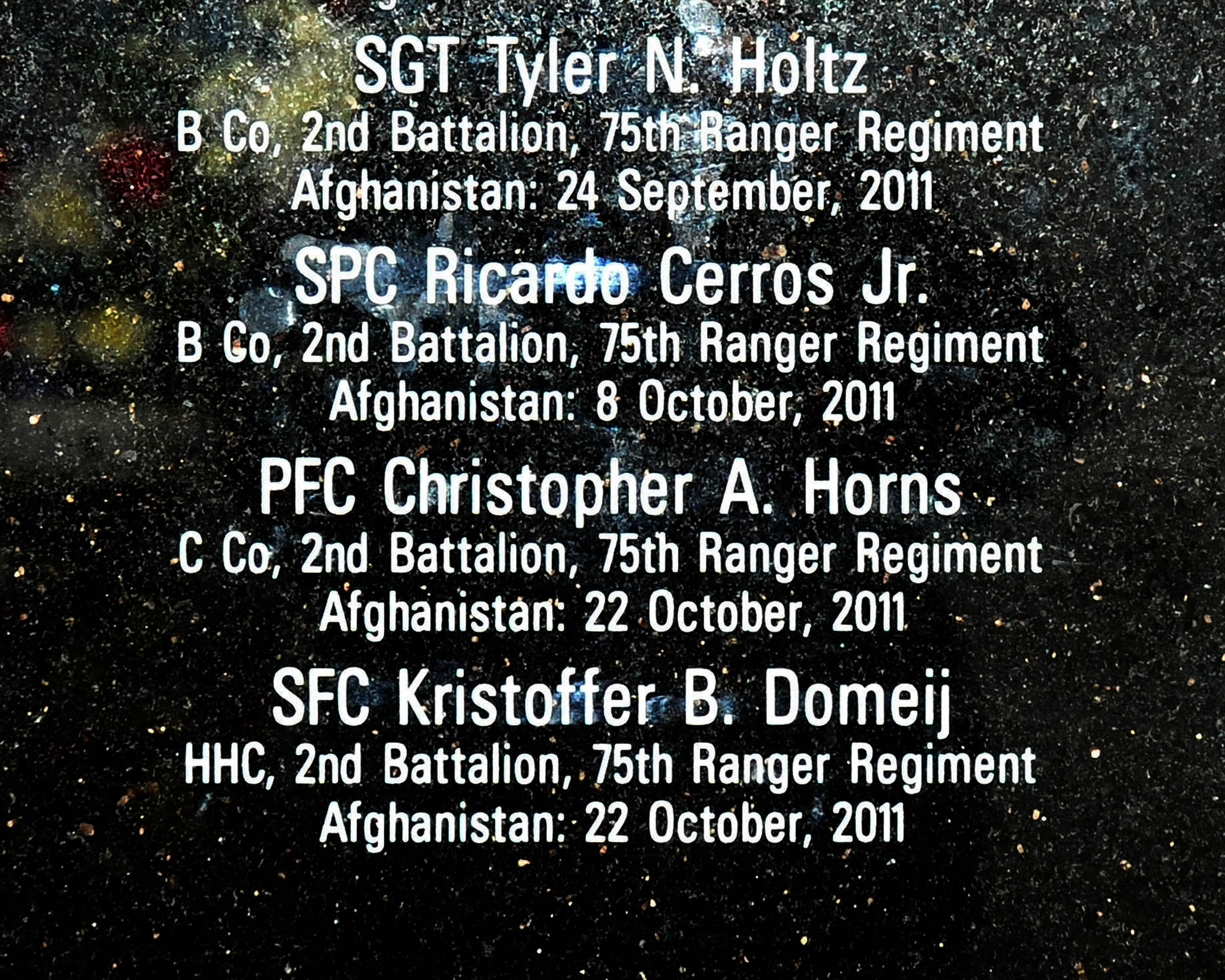
Plaque honoring Domeij on memorial obelisk

- The Joint Fires Observer classroom building at Fort Sill is named in honor of Sgt. 1st Class Domeij.
- On February 8, 2011, the names of fallen Rangers SFC Kristoffer Domeij, Pfc. Christopher Horns, Sgt. Tyler Holtz, and Spc. Ricardo Cerros Jr. were inscribed on the memorial obelisk at 2nd Battalion's headquarters in Joint Base Lewis-McChord, Washington.
- A Belgian blonde beer by the Narrows Brewing Company was named after his radio call sign, "Tyrant-22". S.W.O.R.D. International released a 7.62x51mm rifle named the "Mk-17 MOD 0 Tyrant 22" in his honor.

== Awards and decorations ==
SFC Domeij was awarded the following throughout his military career: (Note: Per the service command: "He will be posthumously awarded the Bronze Star Medal, the Purple Heart, and the Meritorious Service Medal".)

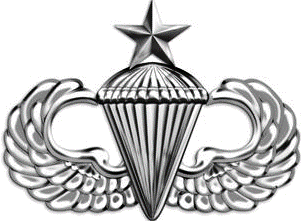

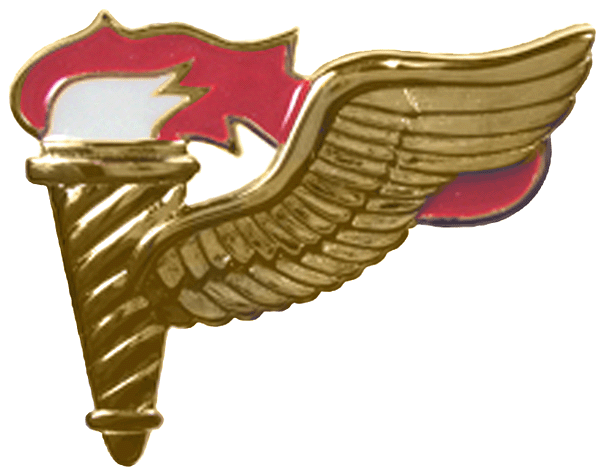

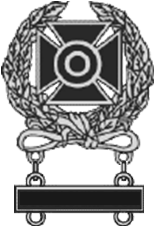

Badge	Combat Action Badge		
Badge	Senior Parachutist Badge		
1st row	Bronze Star (Note: Per the service command: "He will be posthumously awarded the Bronze Star Medal, the Purple Heart, and the Meritorious Service Medal".) with "V" device and 2 Oak leaf clusters (3 awards with valor)		
2nd row	Purple Heart	Meritorious Service Medal	Joint Service Commendation Medal
3rd row	Army Commendation Medal with 4 Oak leaf clusters (5 awards)	Army Achievement Medal	Army Good Conduct Medal with 3 bronze Good conduct loops (4 awards)
4th row	National Defense Service Medal	Afghanistan Campaign Medal with 2 bronze Campaign stars	Iraq Campaign Medal with 3 bronze Campaign stars
5th row	Global War on Terrorism Expeditionary Medal	Global War on Terrorism Service Medal	Non-Commissioned Officer Professional Development Ribbon with Award numeral 3
6th row	Army Service Ribbon	Overseas Service Ribbon with Award numeral 4	NATO Medal for service with ISAF
Badges	Ranger Tab	Pathfinder Badge	Expert Marksmanship Qualification Badge with "Rifle" component bar

Other accoutrements
Expert Infantryman Badge
2nd Ranger Battalion; Combat Service Identification Badge
75th Ranger Regiment; Distinctive unit insignia
8 Overseas Service Bars
4 Service stripes
