= 507th Infantry Regiment =

507th Parachute Infantry Regiment 507th Infantry Regiment
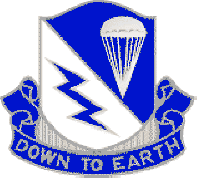
- Distinctive unit insignia of the 507th Infantry Regiment
- Active: 1942–1945; 1948–1949; 1985–present
- Country: United States
- Branch: United States Army
- Type: Airborne forces
- Role: Parachute Infantry
- Part of: United States Army Infantry School, Airborne and Ranger Training Brigade
- Garrison/HQ: Fort Benning, Georgia
- Nickname: "Raff's Ruffians"
- Motto: "Down to Earth"
- Engagements: World War II: Operation Overlord; Ardennes-Alsace; Operation Varsity

Commanders
- Current commander: LTC Christopher L. Gilluly (1/507th Inf Reg); June 18, 2024 to present
- Notable commanders: COL Edson Raff; MG Charles J. Timmes

Insignia
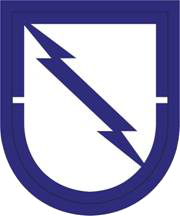
- Beret flash of 1st Battalion, 507th Infantry Regiment

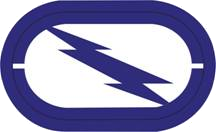
- Background trimming of 1st Battalion, 507th Infantry Regiment

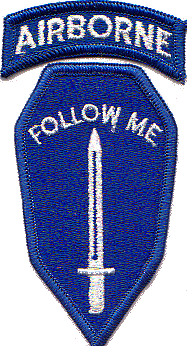
- Shoulder sleeve insignia (SSI) worn by soldiers of the Airborne and Ranger Training Brigade (other soldiers of the US Army Infantry School wear the SSI without the Airborne Tab)

The 507th Parachute Infantry Regiment (507th PIR), now the 507th Infantry Regiment, is an airborne infantry regiment of the United States Army. The regiment was initially assigned to the 82nd Airborne Division in World War II before transferring to the 17th Airborne Division. Now 1st Battalion, 507th Infantry Regiment is part of the United States Army Infantry School, subordinate to its Airborne and Ranger Training Brigade, responsible for the Army's Basic Airborne School, Jumpmaster School, Pathfinder School, and the "Silver Wings" Command Exhibition Parachute Team.

== History ==
=== World War II ===
The 507th Parachute Infantry Regiment was initially formed at Fort Benning, Georgia on 20 July 1942, under command of Colonel George V. Millett. It would participate in three operations during World War II: D-Day, the Battle of the Bulge and Operation Varsity.

As part of the 2nd Airborne Brigade alongside a sister unit, the 508th Parachute Infantry Regiment, the 507th PIR was assigned to the veteran 82nd "All American" Airborne Division, commanded Major General Matthew Ridgway, to replace the 504th Parachute Infantry Regiment, which had suffered many casualties while serving, with distinction, in the fighting in Italy. The regiment arrived in the United Kingdom in late 1943, and began training and preparing for the invasion of Normandy, scheduled for the spring of 1944. Their D-Day objective during Mission Boston, part of the American airborne landings in Normandy, was to help secure the Merderet River crossings. Although their target was supposed to be in Drop Zone T, north of Amfreville, the confusion caused by clouds and flak resulted in a wide scattering of the unit. During this action, Private Joe Gandara earned the Medal of Honor for single-handedly attacking three German machine-gun emplacements. Elements of the 3rd Battalion were involved in the Battle of Graignes. Colonel Millett, the regimental commander, was captured in Amfreville a few days after being deployed. Colonel Edson Raff, who had recently led the 509th Parachute Infantry Battalion, then took command of the regiment. The 507th PIR later became known as Raff's Ruffians. The 507th continued to fight in the Battle of Normandy, sustaining heavy casualties (losing almost 200 men in two days shortly before being withdrawn), before returning to England in July.

Soon after the return to England the 507th was permanently assigned to the 17th Airborne Division, because another of the 82nd's regiments, the 504th Parachute Infantry, had by then returned from fighting at Anzio.

As part of the 17th Airborne, the 507th was not utilized in Operation Market Garden in September 1944 and was still in England training with the new division when the Battle of the Bulge began in December 1944. The 507th redeployed to France on 25 December and was used in the counter-attacks against the Germans in January and early February 1945.

Finally, the 507th Parachute Infantry dropped near Wesel, Germany on 24 March to spearhead the division's assault during Operation Varsity, the airborne crossing of the Rhine. During this action, Private George Peters earned the Medal of Honor for single-handedly attacking a German machine gun emplacement. The regiment subsequently spearheaded the division's advance into Germany, where it ended the war in May 1945.

The 507th Parachute Infantry Regiment was shipped home to the United States and inactivated in September 1945.

=== Recent history ===
The regiment was briefly re-activated in the late 1940s, then again in 1985. On 23 October 1985, it was reorganized and redesignated as the 507th Infantry, a parent regiment under the U.S. Army Regimental System, and transferred to the U.S. Army Training and Doctrine Command. The 1st Battalion serves as the training unit for the U.S. Army Airborne School. Its Headquarters and Headquarters Company (HHC) conducts the Jumpmaster and Pathfinder Courses. Companies A, B, and C conduct the Basic Airborne Course. (Company D, currently inactive, also conducted the Basic Airborne Course.) Company E is a Parachute Rigger Company.

In 2004, two documentaries aired on the 507th. PBS aired the documentary, D-Day: Down to Earth — Return of the 507th. This film connects the regiment's contribution to the war with their journey back to Normandy for the unveiling of a monument in 2002. On 1 June 2004, Investigating History aired, D-Day: The Secret Massacre. The story focuses on the German massacre of French civilians, and wounded paratroopers of the 507th that were taken prisoners, in retaliation for battle at the village of Graignes.

== See also ==
- United States Army Pathfinder School
- United States Army Airborne School
- United States Army Jumpmaster School
