= United States Army Airborne School =

Basic paratrooper training school for the United States armed forces

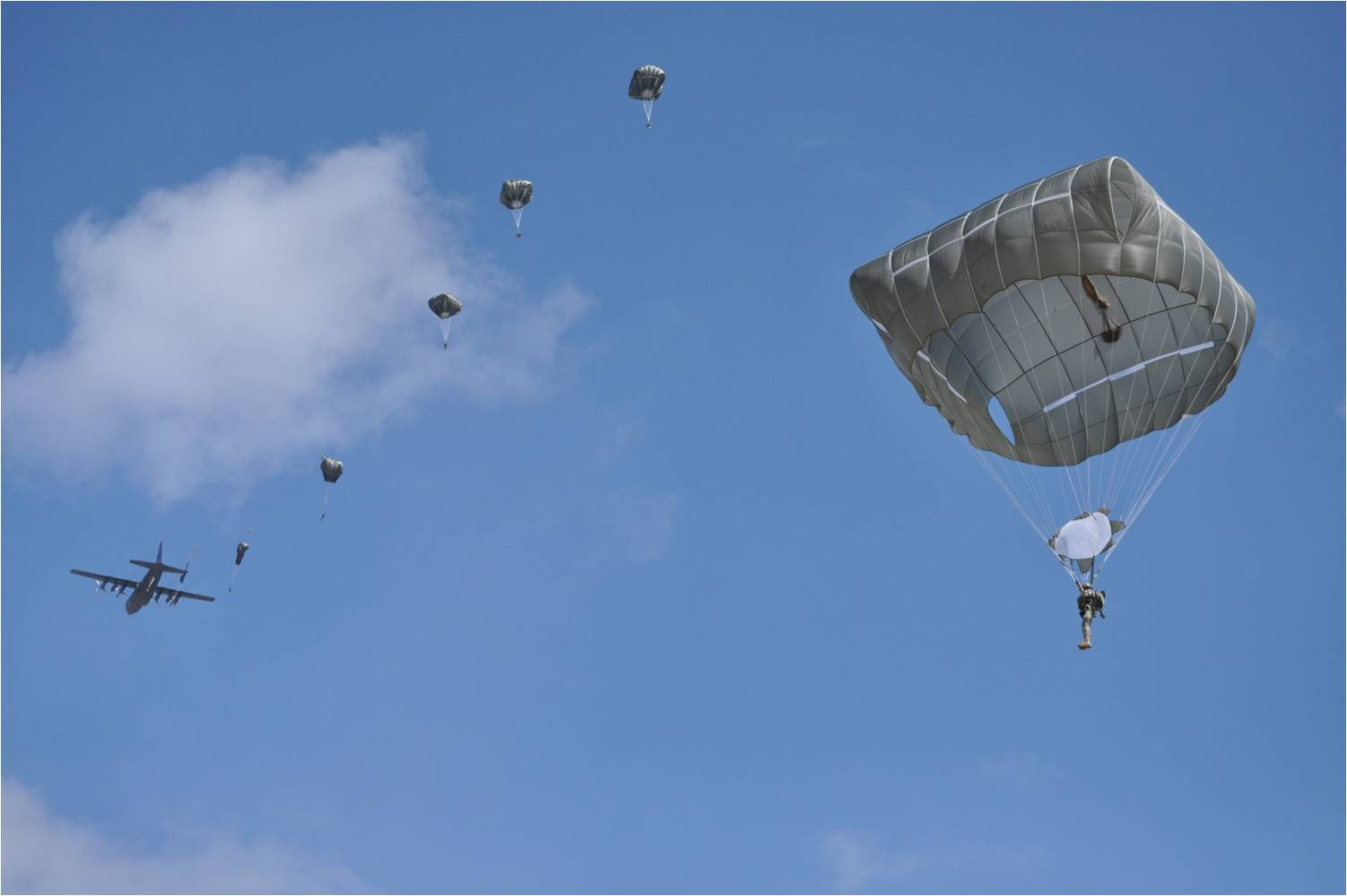
- Students jump from a C-130 using T-11 parachutes during the Airborne School's final week of training.
- Active: June 1940 – present
- Country: United States of America
- Branch: United States Army
- Type: Military training
- Role: Special skills training
- Part of: 1st Battalion, 507th Infantry Regiment
- Garrison/HQ: Fort Benning, Georgia
- Nickname: Jump School

Commanders
- Current commander: LTC Christopher Gilluly

Insignia
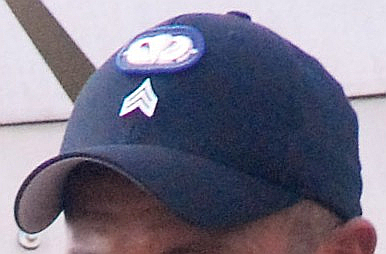
- Headgear worn by special skills instructors, known as "Black Hats"

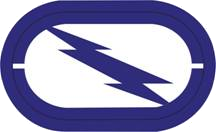
- Airborne Background trimming of 1/507th Infantry, worn on the service uniform and on the special skills instructor's "Black Hat" behind their parachutist badge

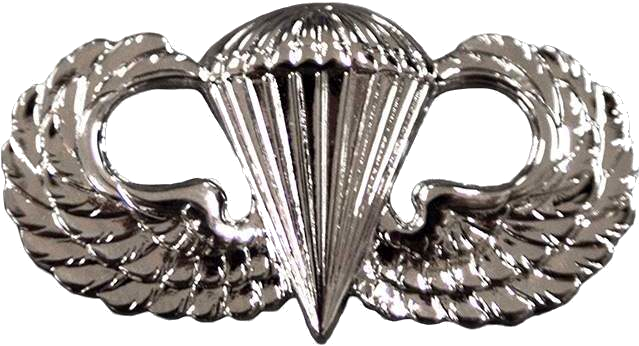
- US Military Parachutist Badge, awarded upon graduation

The United States Army Airborne School—widely known as Jump School—conducts the basic paratrooper (military parachutist) training for the United States Armed Forces. It is operated by the 1st Battalion (Airborne), 507th Infantry, United States Army Infantry School, Fort Benning, Georgia. The Airborne School conducts the Basic Airborne Course, which is open to troops from all branches of the United States Department of Defense, Reserve Officer Training Corps, and allied military personnel.

== History ==
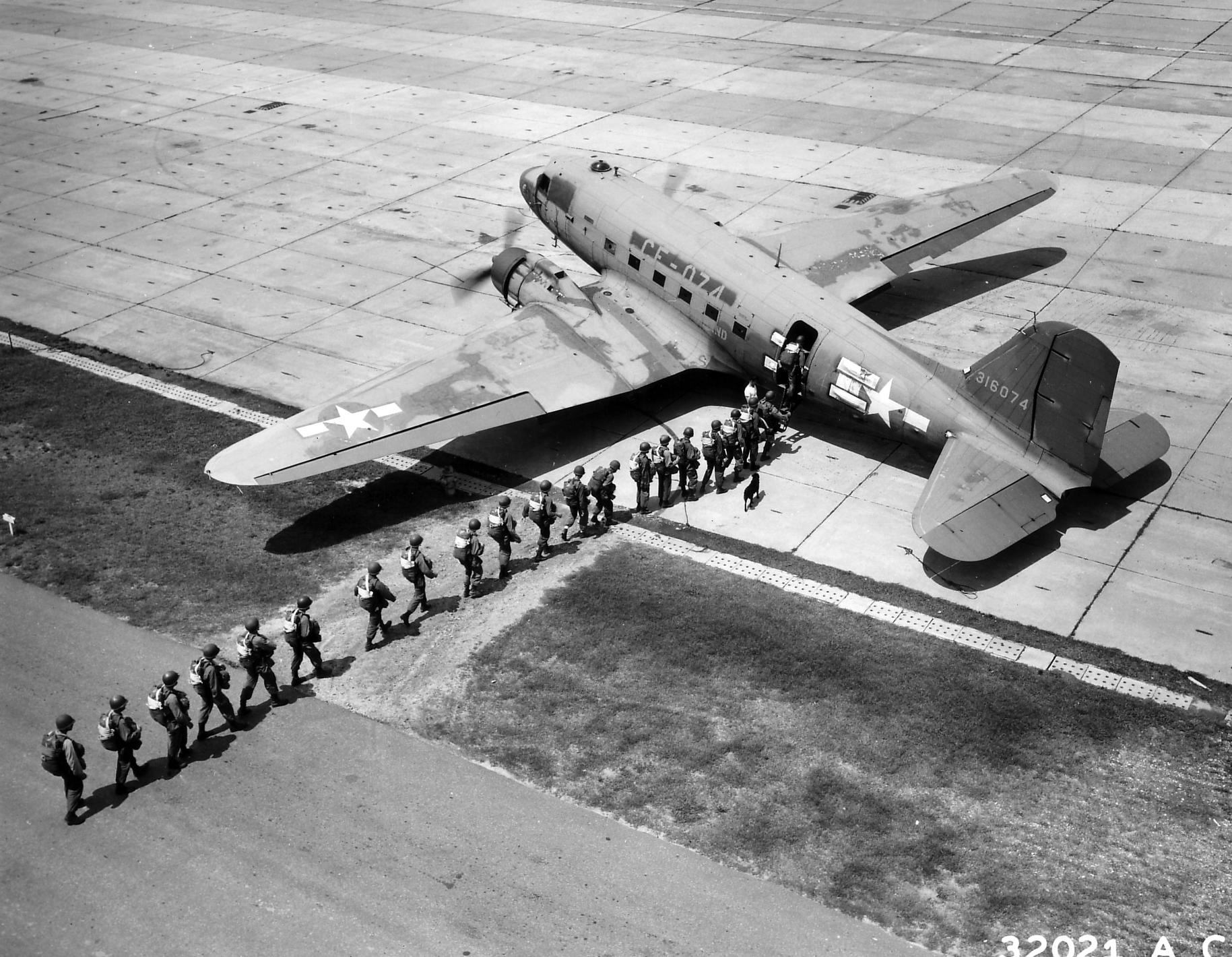
Students board a C-47, from the 75th Troop Carrier Squadron, at Lawson Field (circa August 1946).

U.S. Army Airborne School, circa 1943
Office of War Information film on U.S. Army parachute training during WW II

In 1940, the War Department approved the formation of a test platoon of Airborne Infantry under the direction and control of the Army's Infantry Board. A test platoon of volunteers was organized from Fort Benning's 29th Infantry Regiment, and the 2nd Infantry Division was directed to conduct tests to develop reference data and operational procedures for air-transported troops.

First Lieutenant William T. Ryder volunteered and was made the test platoon's platoon leader, Lieutenant James A. Bassett was designated assistant platoon leader, and forty-eight enlisted men were selected from a pool of 200 volunteers. The platoon moved into tents near Lawson Army Airfield, and an abandoned hangar was obtained for training and parachute packing.

Lieutenant Colonel William C. Lee, a staff officer for the Chief of Infantry, recommended that the test platoon be moved to the Safe Parachute Company at Hightstown, NJ and train using parachute drop towers from the 1939 New York World's Fair. Eighteen days after forming, the platoon was moved to New Jersey and trained for one week on the 250-foot free towers, which proved to be particularly effective – drops from the tower added realism otherwise impossible to duplicate outside of an airplane drop, and proved to the troopers that their parachutes would function safely.

Impressed, the Army purchased two and erected them on what is now Eubanks Field at Fort Benning. Two more were later added, and today three of the original four towers are still in use. Parachute landing training was often conducted by the volunteers jumping from PT platforms and from the back of moving trucks to allow the trainees to experience the shock of landing.

Less than forty-five days after it was formed, members of the test platoon made their first jump from a Douglas B-18 Bolo bomber over Lawson Field on 16 August 1940. Lieutenant Ryder and Private William N. (Red) King became the first officer and enlisted man to make an official jump as paratroopers in the United States Army. On 29 August, the platoon made the first platoon mass jump held in the United States.

Members of the original test platoon formed the battalion cadre of the 501st Parachute Battalion, the first parachute combat unit. The second, the 502nd Parachute Infantry Battalion, was activated on 1 July 1941. As more airborne units were activated, a centralized training facility was organized at Fort Benning on 15 May 1942. Over time, the U.S. Army Parachute School has been known by a variety of names:

- The Airborne School (1 January 1946)
- Airborne Army Aviation Section, The Infantry School (1 November 1946)
- Airborne Department, The Infantry School (February 1955)
- Airborne-Air Mobility Department (February 1956)
- Airborne Department (August 1964)
- Airborne-Air Mobility Department (October 1974)
- Airborne Department (October 1976)
- HHC, 4th Student Battalion (Airborne), The School Brigade (January 1982)
- HHC, 1st Battalion, 507th Parachute Infantry Regiment, The School Brigade (October 1985)
- HHC, 1st Battalion, 507th Parachute Infantry Regiment, attached to HQ, 11th Infantry Regiment (July 1991)
- 1st Battalion, 507th Parachute Infantry Regiment, Airborne and Ranger Training Brigade (April 2014)

The former 4th Student Battalion (Airborne), The School Brigade provided command and control of Airborne School students from the 1960s until October 1985. During its existence, it was organized with a battalion headquarters and up to nine numbered companies, designated the 41st to 49th Student Companies. In the 1960s and 1970s, each Airborne Class normally included students from two different companies. By January 1982, the battalion was organized with an HHC (which took over the mission of the former Airborne Department), and the 41st to 45th Student Companies, with each Student Company providing command and control for one complete Airborne Class.

In October 1985, the assets of the 4th Student Battalion (Airborne) were used to reactivate the 1st Battalion, 507th Parachute Infantry Regiment, as part of the implementation of the U.S. Army Regimental System (USARS). The 1st Bn, 507th PIR was originally organized with six companies: Headquarters and Headquarters Company (HHC), to provide administrative support and conduct the Pathfinder and Jumpmaster Courses; four Line Companies (A, B, C, and D) to conduct the Basic Airborne Course; and Company E, a parachute rigger support company. Company D has since been inactivated.

== Curriculum ==
=== Ground week ===
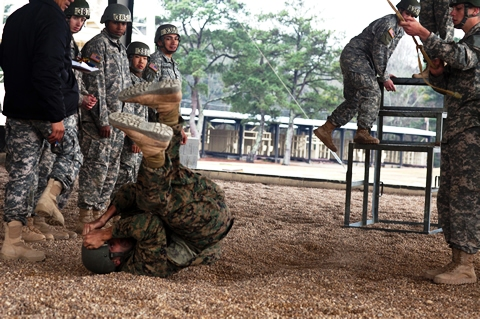
Students practicing PLFs in the sawdust pits during the Basic Airborne Course's ground week

The first week of the Basic Airborne Course is dedicated to teaching prospective troopers how to land properly to minimize the potential for injury and general familiarization with the T-10D and T-11 parachute. The T-10D is a round-shaped parachute and the T-11 is a square-shaped parachute, both using static line extraction with a descent rate of 18–23 ft/sec and 16–20 ft/sec respectively, dependent on the weight and equipment outfitting of the individual jumper. Prospective troopers are taught how to wear the parachute harness correctly and how to use the special training gear. During ground week, prospective troopers will spend the majority of time learning, practicing, and perfecting their parachute landing fall (PLF) and proper exit technique from the aircraft.

To practice the PLFs, soldiers will jump from platforms of various heights into sand or pebble pits, simulating the final stage of parachute landing. This maneuver teaches a soldier to transfer the energy of the fall (landing) up the sides of the lower legs and knees, all the way up the side of the upper body. During this period black hats (instructors) closely observe and correct the prospective troopers' body position and technique making corrections. This week culminates in practice landings from the lateral drift assembly, a zip line type assembly which simulates making contact with the ground traveling at speed and in various directions. In many cases, the first use of the 34-foot tower is made at the end of this period of training.

To continue to week 2, prospective troopers must pass all jump training tests as well as the standard Army physical fitness test (APFT) in the 17–21 year old range, regardless of the prospective trooper's actual age. Ground week is the phase of training in which the largest number of personnel wash out. Depending on circumstances, personnel who fail to advance are either dismissed from the course outright or less commonly recycled back to an earlier class for additional training.

=== Tower week ===
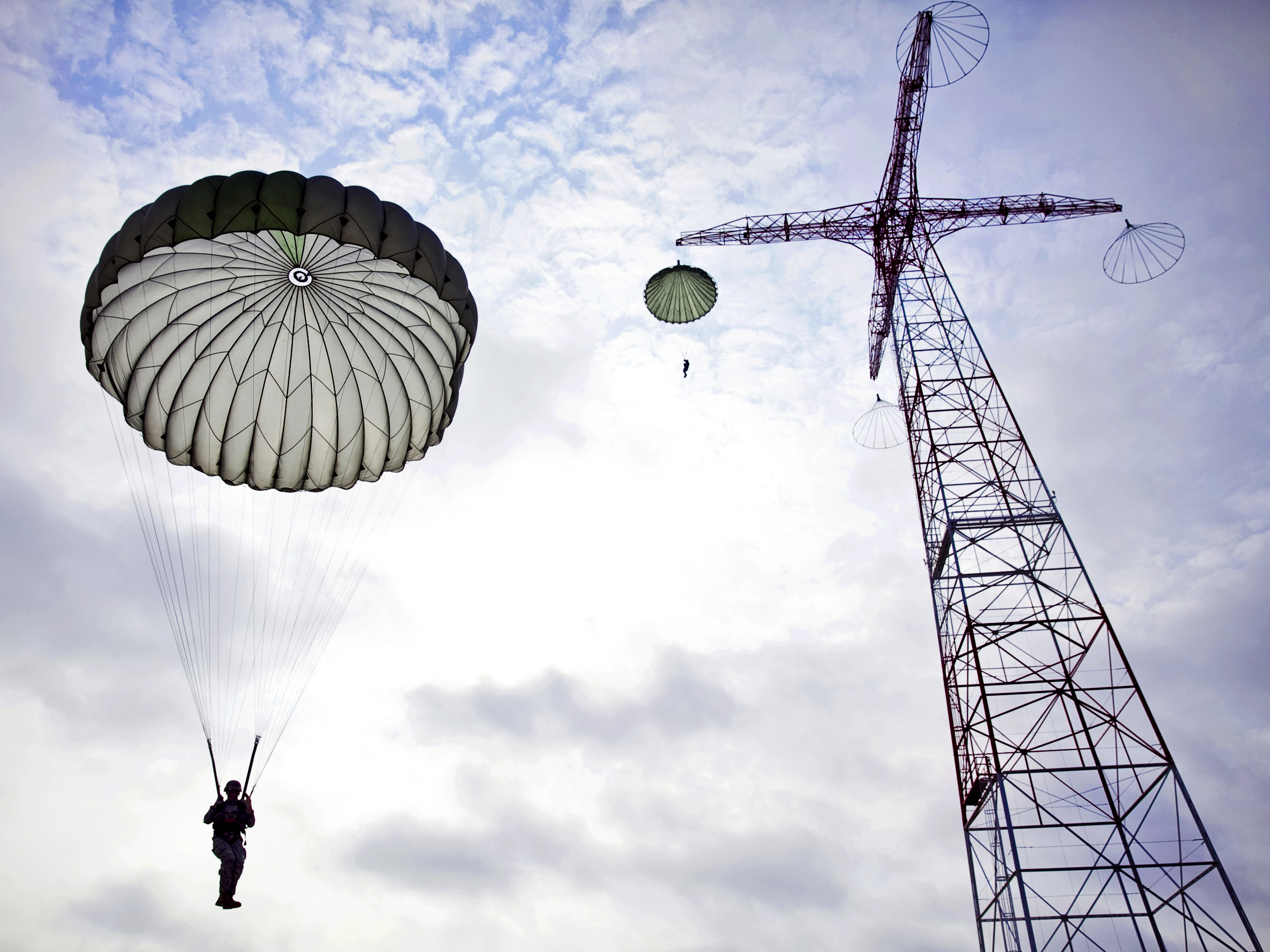
Students drop from the 250 foot tower in T-10 parachutes during tower week.

The second week of Jump School concentrates on the jump towers. Prospective troopers will continue using the 34-foot tower in addition to the swing-landing trainer, a suspended harness trainer, and occasionally the 250-foot tower. Soldiers will become familiar with the mock door trainer to simulate mass exit training (how to exit an aircraft in flight). Additionally, prospective troopers are taught the different phases of parachute flight from aircraft exit, through opening shock and chute deployment, then onto the deployment of the risers, steering the chute, and all the way to landing. One critical skill learned is how to identify a parachute malfunction and deal with it. This may involve emergency procedures including when and how to deploy the reserve parachute. Soldiers also learn about oscillation, landing falls, and how to recover from drag. The T-10D and T-11 parachutes are partially steerable using the parachute risers and students are taught the different techniques to steer their chutes into the wind and aim for the Point of Impact at the center of the Drop Zone. The second week completes a soldier's individual skill training and begins building team effort skills. Once successfully completing the skills required and the physical fitness requirements, a soldier progresses to jump week.

=== Jump week ===
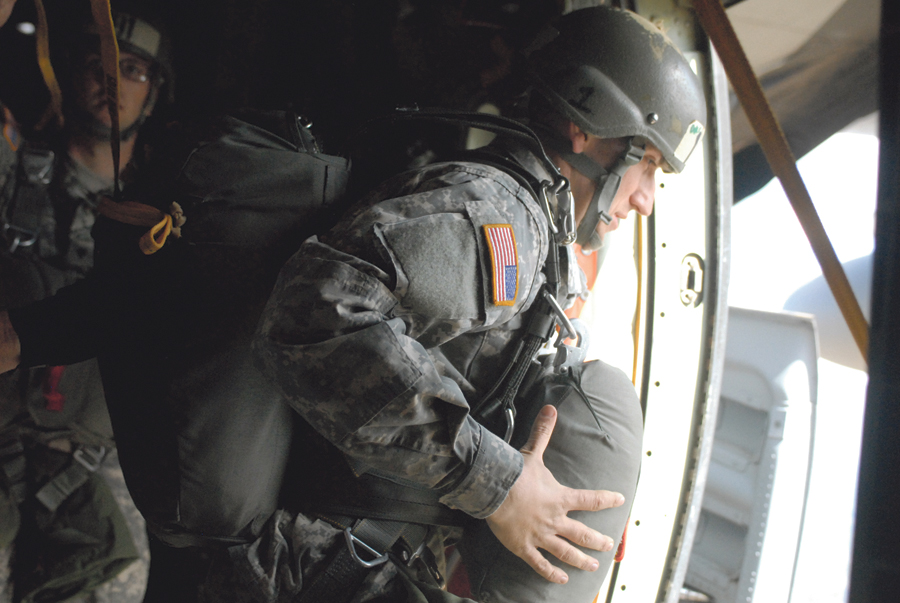
A student exits an aircraft at 1,250 feet at the first parachute drop of jump week. This was the first time the new T-11 was used at the Airborne School (circa March 2010).

U.S. Army Airborne School-Jump Week
Description of the third week of Airborne School, known as "jump week" (2010)

Finally, soldiers get to practice their new skills while jumping out of aircraft in flight. The C-130 or C-17 aircraft pick up the paratrooper students in front of the hangar at Lawson Army Airfield. From there it is a very short flight to Fryar Field (commonly referred to as "Fryar Drop Zone"), where all of the training jumps are accomplished. Fryar Field is named after Private Elmer E. Fryar of the United States Army's 511th Parachute Infantry Regiment, who posthumously received the Medal of Honor for his actions in World War II.

The Air Force aircraft fly at 1250 feet above the ground at an airspeed of about 113 knots. After the flight crew completes the pre-drop and slow-down checklists, soldiers rise out of their seats and move at the jumpmaster's direction to one of two paratroop doors (on each side of the aircraft). At "green light" one stick of soldiers exits the plane – jumpers continue to move to the door until the red light is illuminated. At that point the aircraft will begin its racetrack maneuver circling back to the beginning of the drop zone and continue to do this until all jumpers have jumped.

A soldier must complete five jumps, normally including at least one night jump, to graduate Airborne School. During jump week, the schedule varies and soldiers will jump in a variety of configurations from unloaded Hollywood to fully equipped and loaded Combat Equipment jumps. Jump week can seem chaotic, with a large group of soldiers gathered in the ready-room waiting to be loaded onto the aircraft one chalk at a time. Immediately after landing on the Drop Zone (DZ), the soldiers collect their parachutes and other gear and meet back at the rally point on one side of the DZ, where they wait for a bus to take them back to Lawson Army Airfield to get ready for their next jump.

The jump schedule varies greatly based on class dynamics, weather, and aircraft. Graduation is normally conducted at 0900 on Friday of Jump Week at the south end of Eubanks Field on the Airborne Walk. However, if there is inclement weather, or other factors delay the scheduled jumps, graduation may be conducted on Fryar Drop Zone following the last jump. Guests and family members are welcome to observe all of the jumps at the DZ, attend the graduation ceremony, and participate in awarding the parachutist wings to the soldiers. On graduation day, families typically spend only a few minutes with their soldier, pinning on his or her new airborne wings. The soldier frequently departs Fort Benning that day or the following day, to attend another advanced military school or to report to another duty station.

== Personnel ==
=== Instructors ===
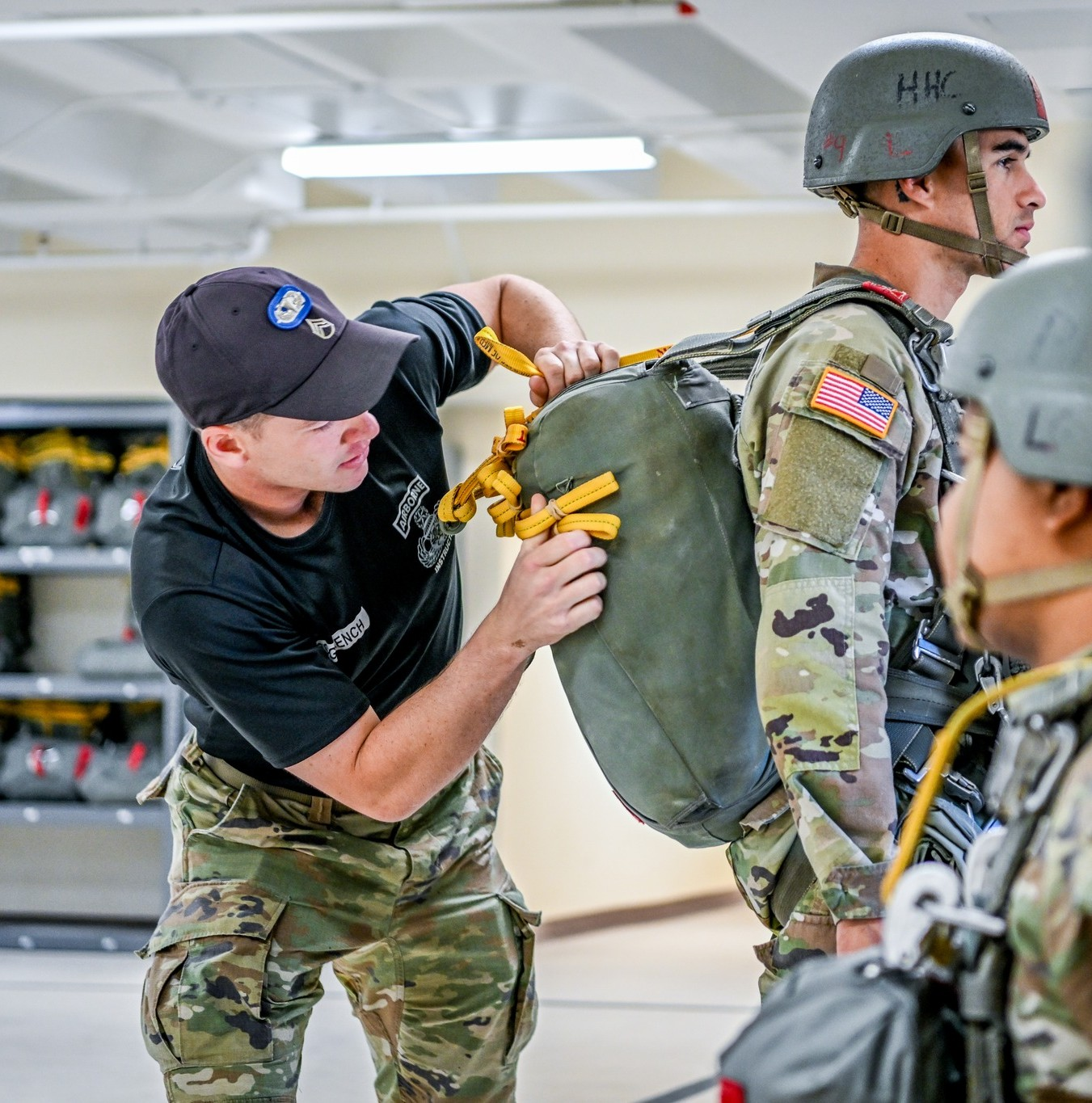
A "Black Hat" conducts Jumpmaster Personnel Inspection

The Airborne School instructors are commonly referred to as "Black Hats", due to the distinguishing black baseball caps with shiny brass rank insignia and parachutist badge that is part of the instructor's uniform. However, all students at the school are required to address them as "Sergeant (or Petty Officer in the case of a Navy instructor) Airborne". A student's interaction with Black Hats consists largely of shouting, "clear Sergeant, Airborne!", and "not clear Sergeant, Airborne!" instead of yes or no. Instructors come predominately from the United States Army, however the Marine Corps, Navy or Air Force also provide instructors. The reasoning is that because students from four military services attend the training, each service insists that they have at least one representative to ensure quality instruction.

=== Students ===
The vast majority of students at Airborne School come from the U.S. Army. This includes soldiers assigned to the 82nd Airborne Division, XVIII Airborne Corps, 4th BCT 25th Infantry Division, 173rd Airborne BCT, United States Special Operations Command, and United States Army Civil Affairs and Psychological Operations Command.

Marine Recon, ANGLICO, and MARSOC personnel will also attend as part of their pipeline or as advance training. Recent Navy BUD/S graduates, Navy SWCC, Navy EOD, Navy SARC, USAF Combat Controllers, USAF Special Reconnaissance, USAF Pararescuemen and USAF Tactical Air Control Party also attend the school in order to be jump-qualified. Summer cycles frequently include a substantial numbers of Army ROTC and West Point cadets along with occasional cadets from other service academies and college ROTC programs. Summer classes can swell to 600+ candidates. The US Coast Guard does not usually participate in Airborne training.

During in-processing, each student is given a roster number (with the prefix C, N, or A to identify a cadet, NCO, or officer, respectively, or simply a 3 digit number with no prefix for junior enlisted personnel), which is applied to the student's assigned equipment and used as identification throughout training.

All students are quartered in gender-segregated, open-bay company barracks for the entire course except for officers, warrant officers, and senior non-commissioned officers (E7 and above), who are assigned to bachelor officer's quarters. However, during the COVID-19 pandemic:

- the school has required all attendees to quarantine for two weeks at their home stations or at another location on Fort Benning and secure sterile travel to the course, whereupon all attendees—including officers, warrant officers, and senior non-commissioned officers—are housed in the gender-segregated, open-bay company barracks for the course's entirety;
- all attendees are confined to the barracks / battalion footprint area except during training (including organized physical training), jumps, and sick call; violating the barracks confinement results in course disqualification.

In December 1973 Pvt. Rita Johnson and Pvt. Janice A. Kutch became the first women to graduate from the Basic Airborne Course. they graduated from the 43rd Co., 4th Battalion, TSB.

Upon satisfactory completion of the course, the student is awarded:

- United States Army Parachutist Badge (commonly referred to as "Jump Wings");
- Orders certificating authorizing its wear of the badge;
- P ASI (Additional Skill Identifier) regardless of branch of service or MOS.

== See also ==
- United States Army Jumpmaster School
- United States Military Free-Fall School
- United States Military Parachute Rigger School
- United States Army Air Assault School
- United States Army Pathfinder School
- No. 1 Parachute Training School RAF
- Australian Defence Force Parachuting School
- Parachute Training School (Pakistan Army)
- "Blood on the Risers"
- United States Army Reconnaissance and Surveillance Leaders Course
- Ranger Assessment and Selection Program
- Ranger School
