= United States Army Jumpmaster School =

U.S. Army Jumpmaster School
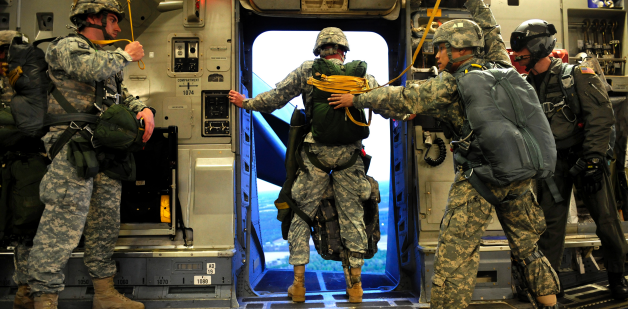
- An assistant jumpmaster stands in the door of a C-17 at an altitude of 1,200 feet, looking for terrain features identified as 1 minute or 30 second reference points.
- Active: 1971-present
- Country: United States of America
- Branch: United States Army
- Type: Military training
- Role: Advanced special skills training

Insignia
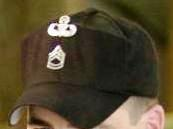
- Headgear worn by special skills instructors, known as "Black Hats"

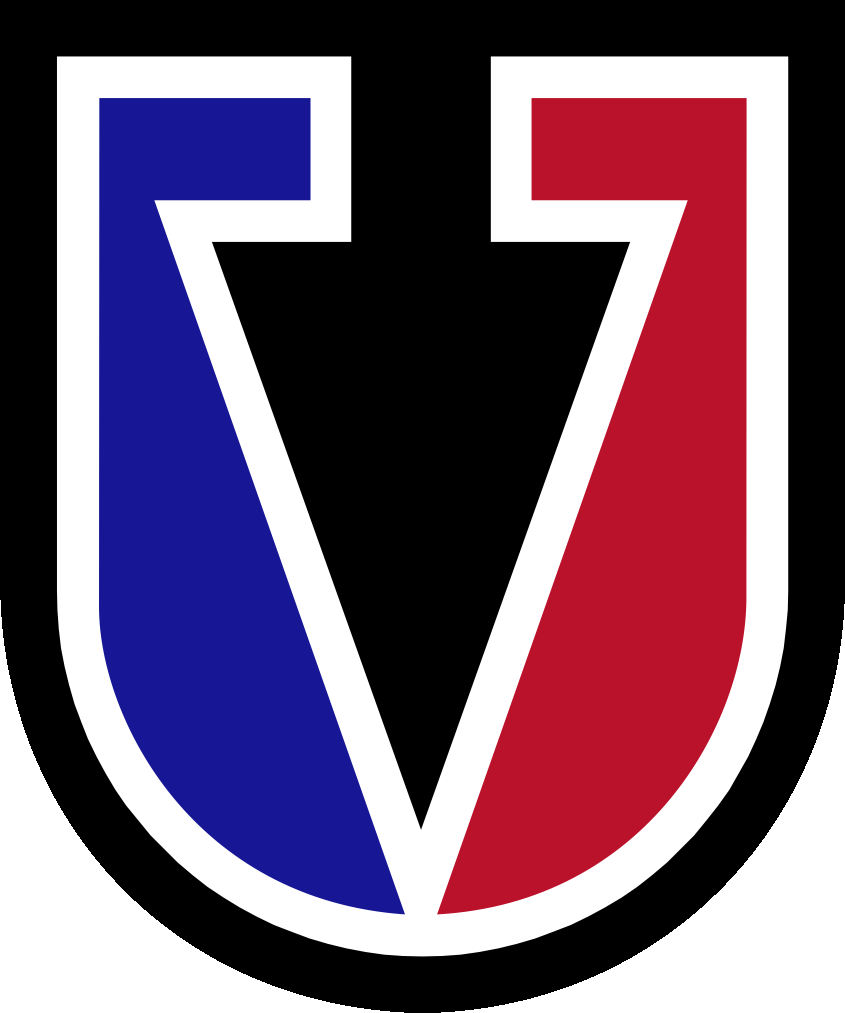
- Beret flash of the U.S. Army Advanced Airborne School at Fort Bragg

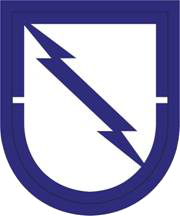
- Beret flash of the 1st Bn, 507th Inf Reg who conduct all parachute training at Fort Benning

Jumpmaster MC7 combat equipment and jumper inspection tutorial

The United States Army Jumpmaster School trains personnel in the skills necessary to jumpmaster a combat-equipped jump and the proper attaching, jumping, and releasing of combat and individual equipment while participating in an actual jump that is proficient in the duties and responsibilities of the Jumpmaster and Safety; procedures for rigging individual equipment containers and door bundles; personnel parachute components by their specific nomenclature and characteristics; procedures and standards required to conduct a Jumpmaster Personnel Inspection (JMPI); the duties and responsibilities of the Drop Zone Safety Officer; the presentation of the Jumpmaster briefing and sustained airborne training (SAT); and the execution of the duties of a Jumpmaster and Safety from a USAF aircraft during a day/night combat equipment jump.

== Training ==
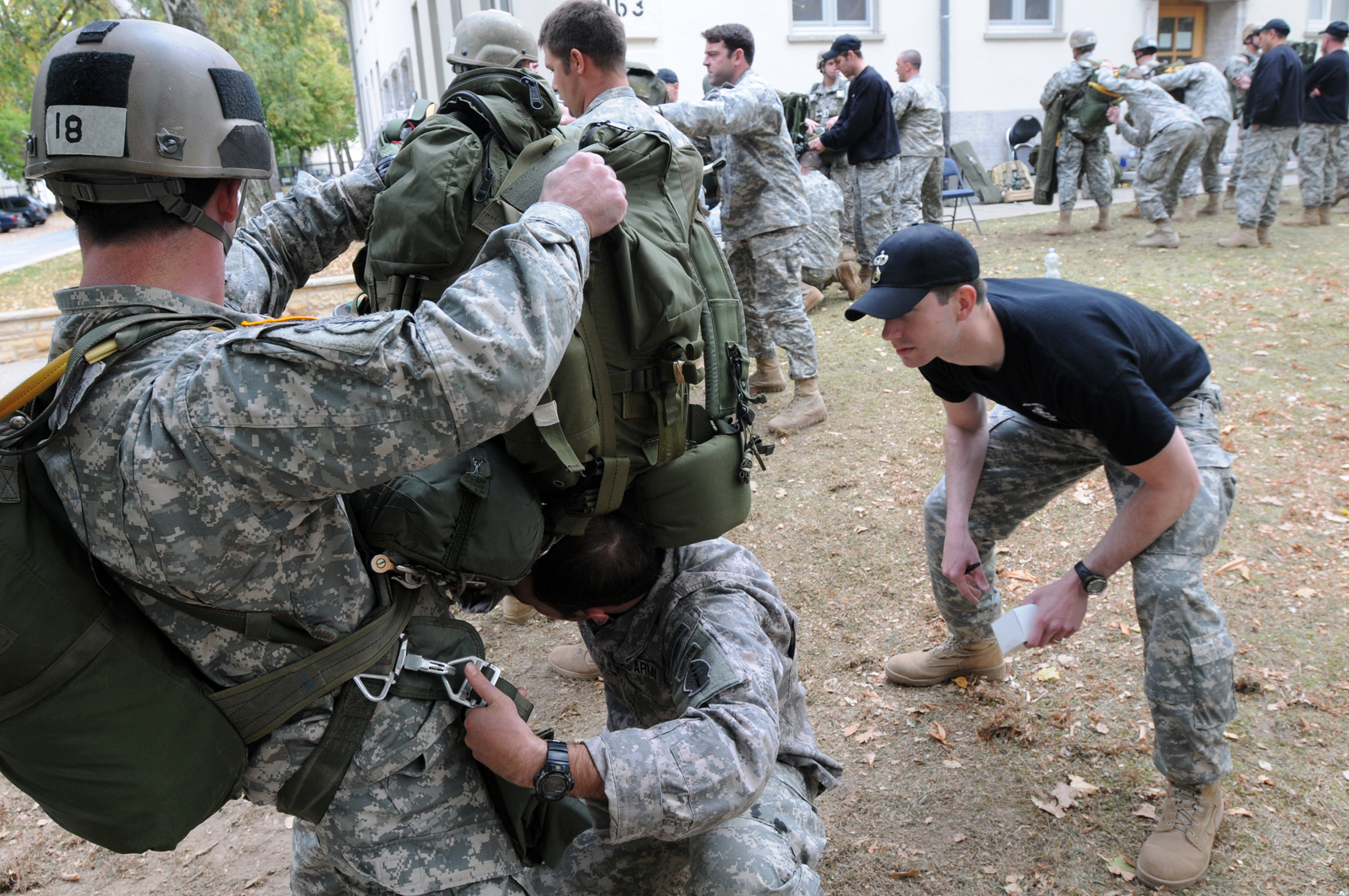
An instructor from the USASOC Jumpmaster School's MTT evaluating a student performing JMPI

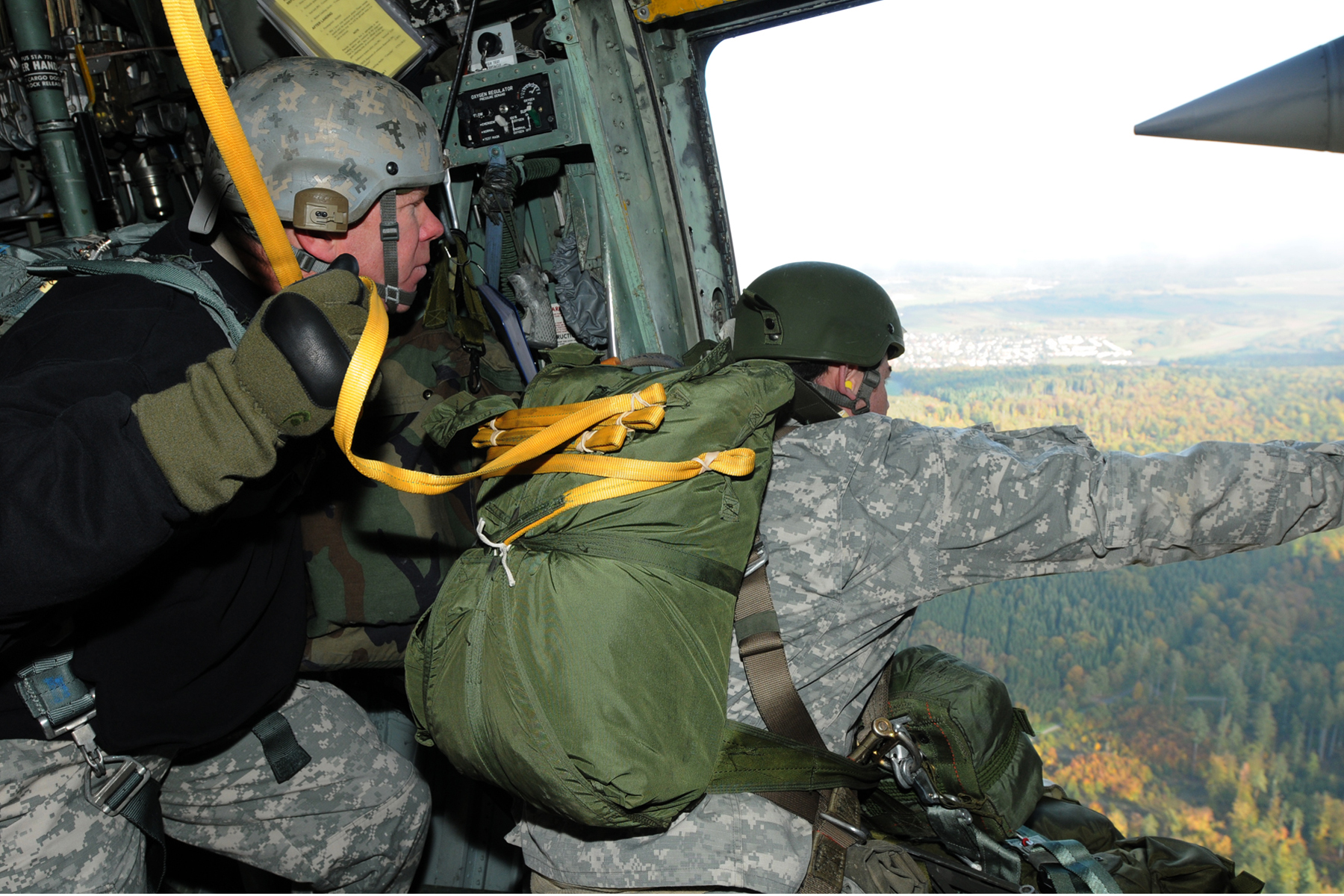
An instructor from the USASOC Jumpmaster School's MTT evaluates a student conducting PWAC as he checks for obstacles and spots the drop zone

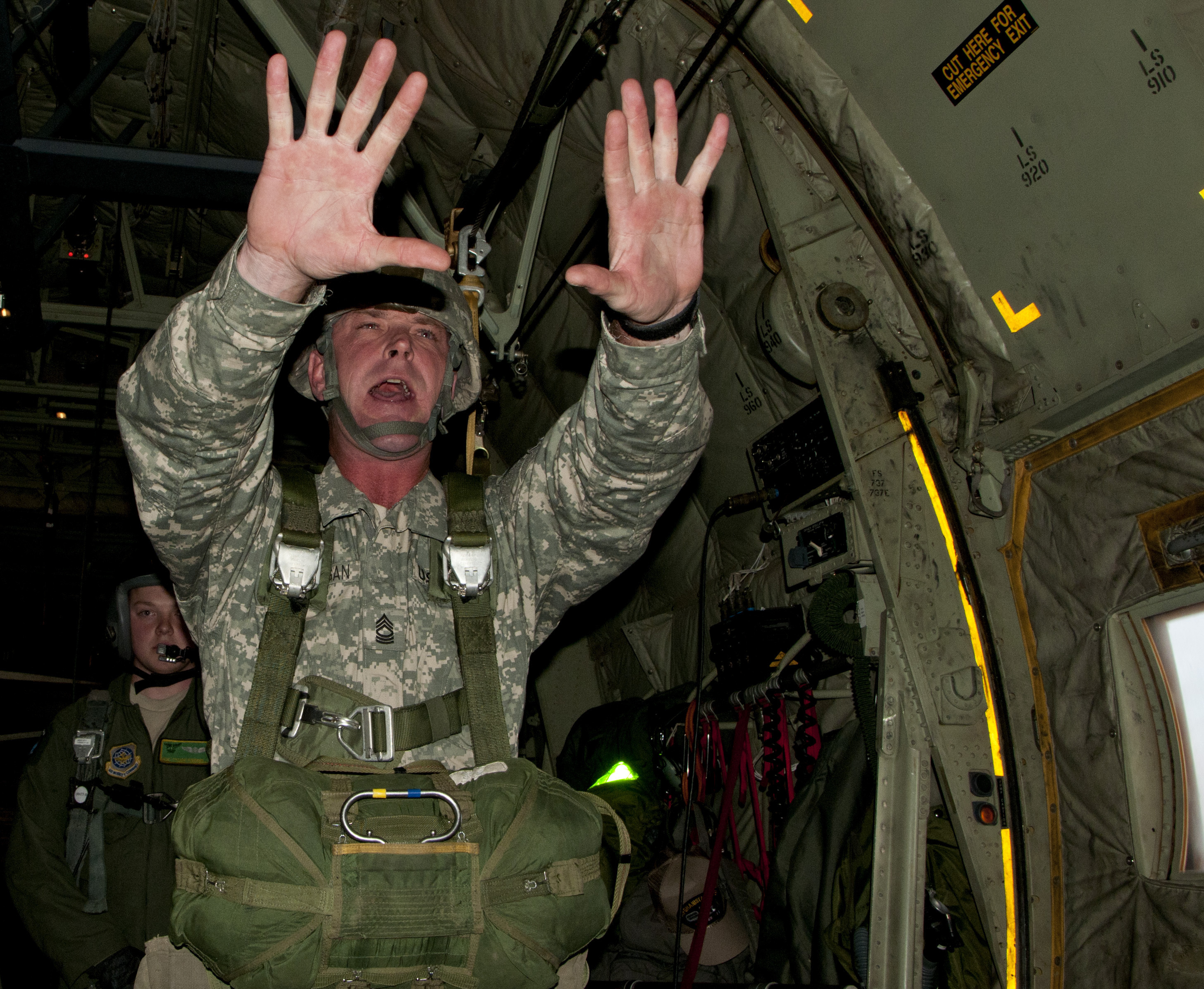
A jumpmaster starts the PWAC sequence by giving his paratroopers the "ten-minutes" command as he begins to prepare them to exit the aircraft

In order to obtain the coveted Jumpmaster rating, an individual must complete a series of requirements. Since 1950, only those in the ranks of Sergeant and above may perform any Jumpmaster duties. The individual must be a graduate of The U.S. Army Advanced Airborne School at Fort Bragg, North Carolina, the United States Army Jumpmaster School at Fort Benning, Georgia or the U.S. Army Special Operations Command (USASOC) Jumpmaster School Mobile Training Teams (MTT). In order to enter these elite military schools, the individual must meet the following standards:

1. Active Army and Reserve Component Officer and Enlisted Personnel (E-5 or above).
2. Must be qualified as a parachutist and have a minimum of 12 static line parachute jumps from a high-performance aircraft (C-130, C-141, C27J, C-17 or C-5 only).
3. Must have been on jump status for a minimum of 12 months. These months do not have to be consecutive.
4. An Airborne physical current within 5 years.
5. Must be recommended by Battalion Commander or officer in the grade of Lieutenant colonel (signed service school worksheet or unit order of merit list).
6. Must have a static line jump within the past 180 days.
7. Sister Service Members are authorized to attend as long as they are in a billet that requires the use of Jumpmaster skills / knowledge. Marine Corps and Air Force enlisted personnel E-4 and above may attend.
8. All waivers to the above, must be routed from the first O-5 Commander or equivalent thru the Commander, 1-507th Parachute Infantry Regiment to Commander, Airborne and Ranger Training Brigade. All waivers must be received thirty (30) days prior to the start of the course.

== Exams ==
The three Jumpmaster schools are each roughly three weeks in length and consist of six key examinations:

1. Nomenclature Exam
2. Pre-Jump Training Exam
3. Written Exam
4. Practical Work In Aircraft (PWAC)
5. JMPI
6. Safety Exam

== Preparation ==
Students are expected to come prepared for class and to spend the time required to learn the material presented throughout each day. Upon arrival each student should already know all of the nomenclature for both the T-10 and T-11 parachute systems.

Generally speaking, it takes a potential jumpmaster at least two attempts to pass the course (less than 30% of attendees earn a first time Go). In recognition of this, returning students are commonly referred to as "alumni" by their Black Hat instructors. There is also a common joke that those who pass on their first attempt actually tested out early from the "full six week course".

== Graduation ==
Upon completion of the course new jumpmasters are expected to report to their units with a thorough understanding of the basic skills presented in class. They should then familiarize themselves with their units SOPs, so that they can keep up with the accelerated rate of learning required to keep up with their unit's operational tempo. Above all else they should always stress rehearsals.

=== Honor Graduate ===
The student who graduates the jumpmaster course with the highest standing receives the Harry "Tug" Wilson Award. This award is named after Warrant Officer Harry "Tug" Wilson, the U.S. Army's most experienced airborne jumper during World War II, who served in an instrumental position within the Army's elite Parachute Test Platoon, testing multiple new parachute systems under a variety of conditions.

== See also ==
- United States Army Airborne School
- United States Military Free-Fall School
- United States Military Parachute Rigger School
- United States Army Air Assault School
- United States Army Pathfinder School
- No. 1 Parachute Training School RAF
- Australian Defence Force Parachuting School
- Parachute Training School (Pakistan Army)
- "Blood on the Risers"
