= Jumpmaster =

Paratrooper jump instructors

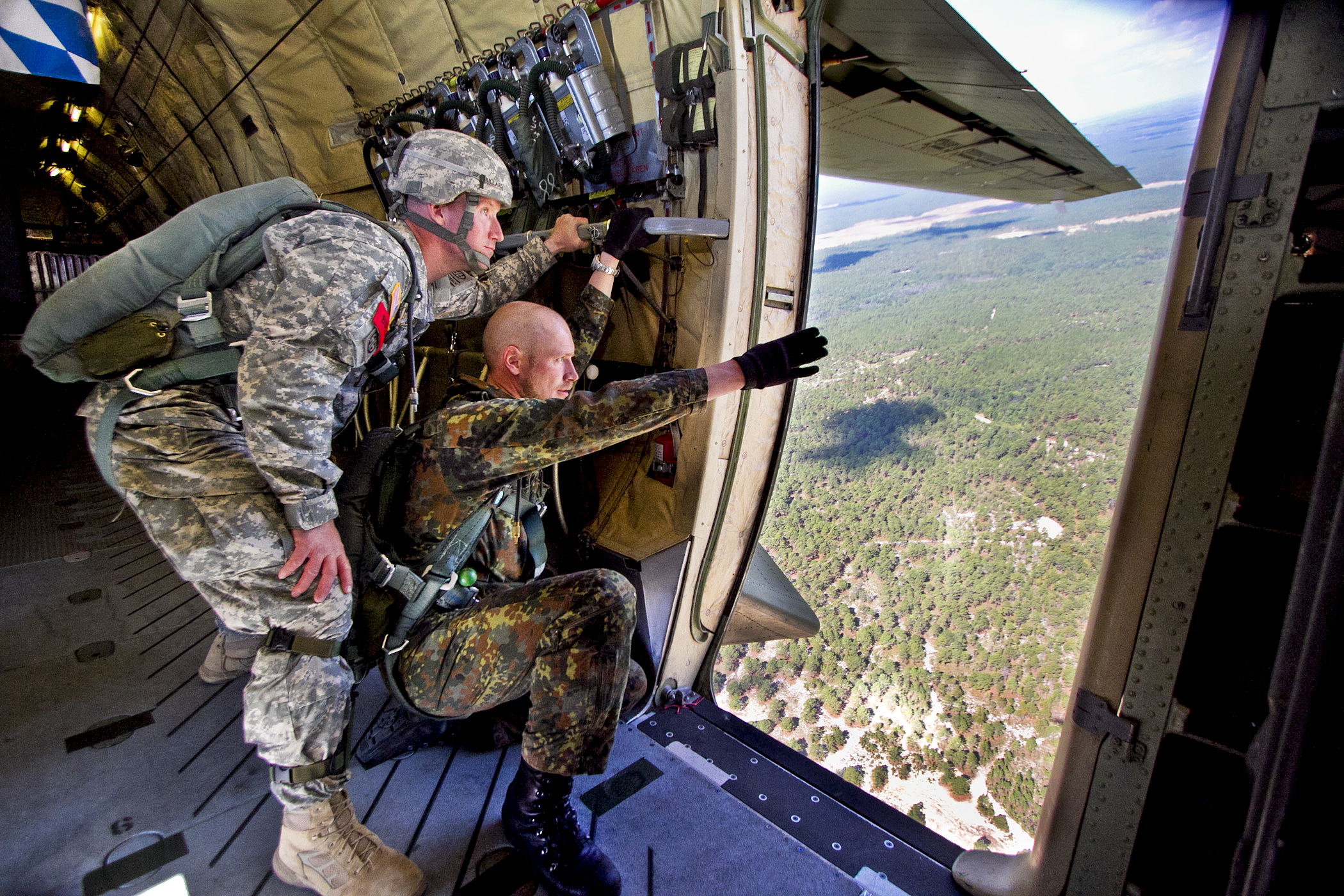
Jumpmasters from the U.S. and German Armies during joint training exercises over Fort Bragg (2010)

Jumpmasters are the expert paratroopers in an airborne unit who train and teach the military techniques for jumping from airplanes. They are responsible for the safe and successful completion of airborne operations.

== Military ==
In military applications, jumpmasters are used for static line and freefall jumps.

=== Australia ===
In Australia, jumpmasters are formed and used by the 2nd Commandos Regiment.

Jumpmasters from the 17th Special Operations Squadron and 2nd Commandos Regiment conduct jump operation exercises to strengthen interoperability relationship between U.S. and Australian special operation forces.

=== Canada ===
In Canada, jumpmaster training is conducted for the Canadian Forces by the Canadian Army Advanced Warfare Centre at CFB Trenton in Trenton, Ontario. The Queen's Own Rifles of Canada is the only Primary Reserve unit with jumpmasters.

Typically those selected for training are very skilled as parachutists. At a minimum, they are senior corporals who have completed leadership training.

Separate courses are conducted for static line jumpmasters and freefall jumpmasters (FJMs).

=== United States ===
A jumpmaster gives the "GO" command to a paratrooper during rotary-wing airborne assault training from a UH-60 at Fort Bragg, NC

==== Role ====
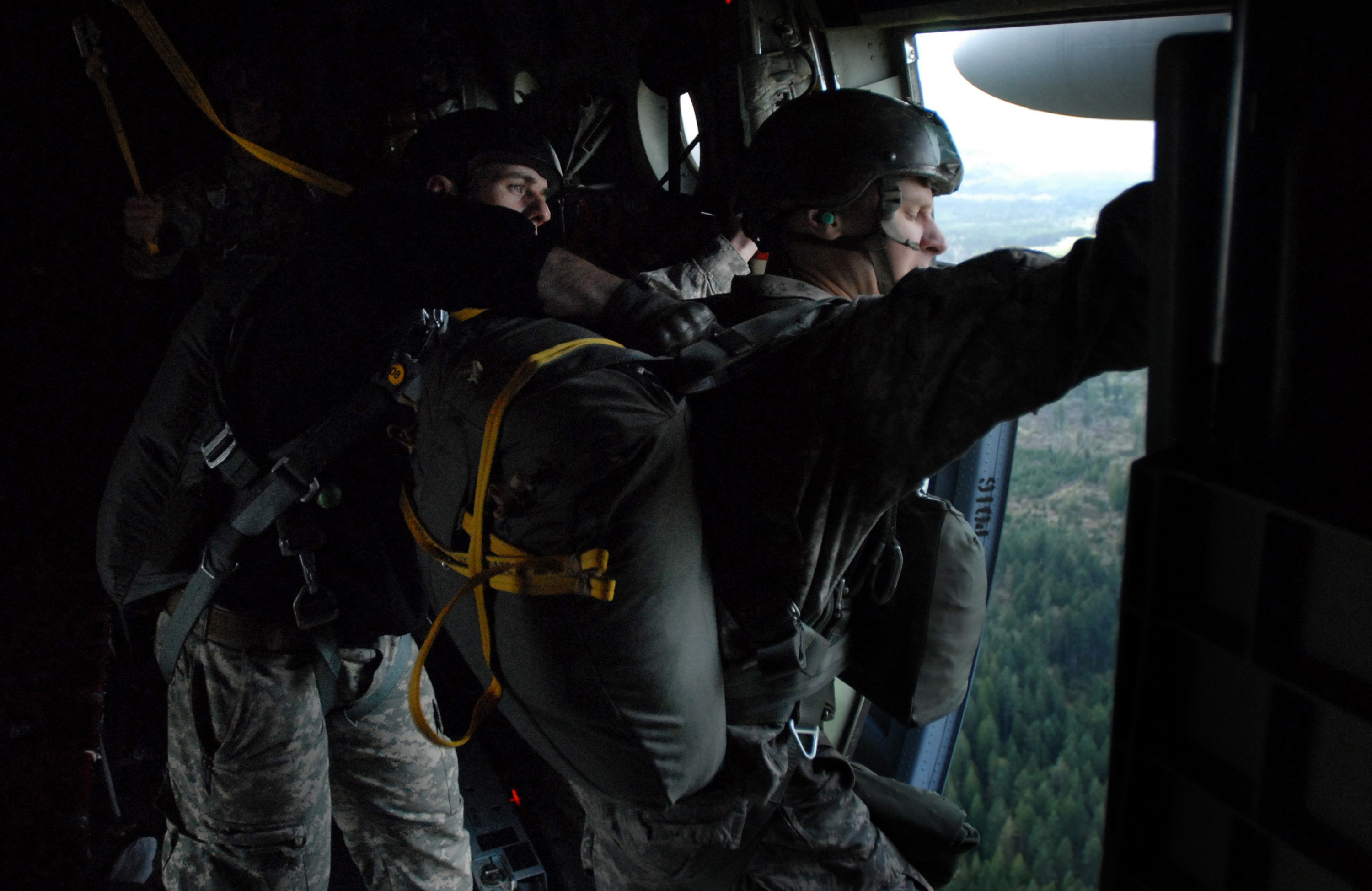
A Jumpmaster student at Joint Base Lewis-McChord prepares to check the paratroop door under the observation of a Jumpmaster Instructor.

There are two types of Jumpmasters within the US Army; Military Free Fall and Static Line. This explanation will be focused on Static Line Jumpmasters, who are generally just referred to as Jumpmaster. Jumpmasters are easily identifiable in Army formations by their ability to earn an advanced rating for their Parachutist Badge. Senior Parachutists are entitled to a Star atop their wings while Master Parachutists wear a Star and Wreath. In some units Jumpmasters identify themselves to jumpers by wearing a bright red or yellow armband indicating that these Jumpmasters are both qualified (trained in the parachute system being used) and current (within regulations to perform duties as a Jumpmaster). Personnel may be qualified as a Jumpmaster but if they are not current (having pulled duties as a jumpmaster within 180 days) they may not assist the Jumpmaster team or perform duties as a Jumpmaster until completing refresher training. Red is worn by the active Jumpmaster Team. Yellow is worn by any Jumpmasters who are jumping, but not actively participating on the Jumpmaster Team. In addition to this armband, each member of the Jumpmaster Team may wear a fixed-blade knife on their lower leg. The Jumpmaster wears this knife in case a jumper somehow becomes entangled during the exiting process, becoming a towed parachutist, and must be immediately cut free.

==== Duties and responsibilities ====
Jumpmasters are responsible for transforming soldiers who enter Army Airborne School into paratroopers and leading airborne jump operations in airborne units across all branches of services.

Jumpmasters make sure each and every paratrooper is proficient at the following airborne operational techniques:

1. Day/Night Combat Equipment Jump
2. Parachute Safety
3. Parachute Deployment
4. Parachute Control
5. Airplane Procedures
6. Static-Line Jump
7. Landing Techniques

Duties of a Jumpmaster include:

1. Organizing and mustering their stick or chalk of jumpers.
2. Inspecting all items of equipment prior to loading of the aircraft (to include ALICE or MOLLE pack, Modular Airborne Weapons Case, and any Special Items of Equipment).
3. Inspecting all jumpers for proper donning, fit, and serviceability of their helmet (Ballistic or Advanced Combat) and parachute (T-10D, MC1-1D, MC-6, T-11).
4. Confirmation of in-flight navigation in accordance with flight diagram and Navigation Officer.
5. Safety inspection of the Paratroop Door, Jump Platform, Wind deflector, and Clear to the Rear of the dropping aircraft.
6. Identification of in flight reference points.
7. Proper control of the Paratroop Door during exit.

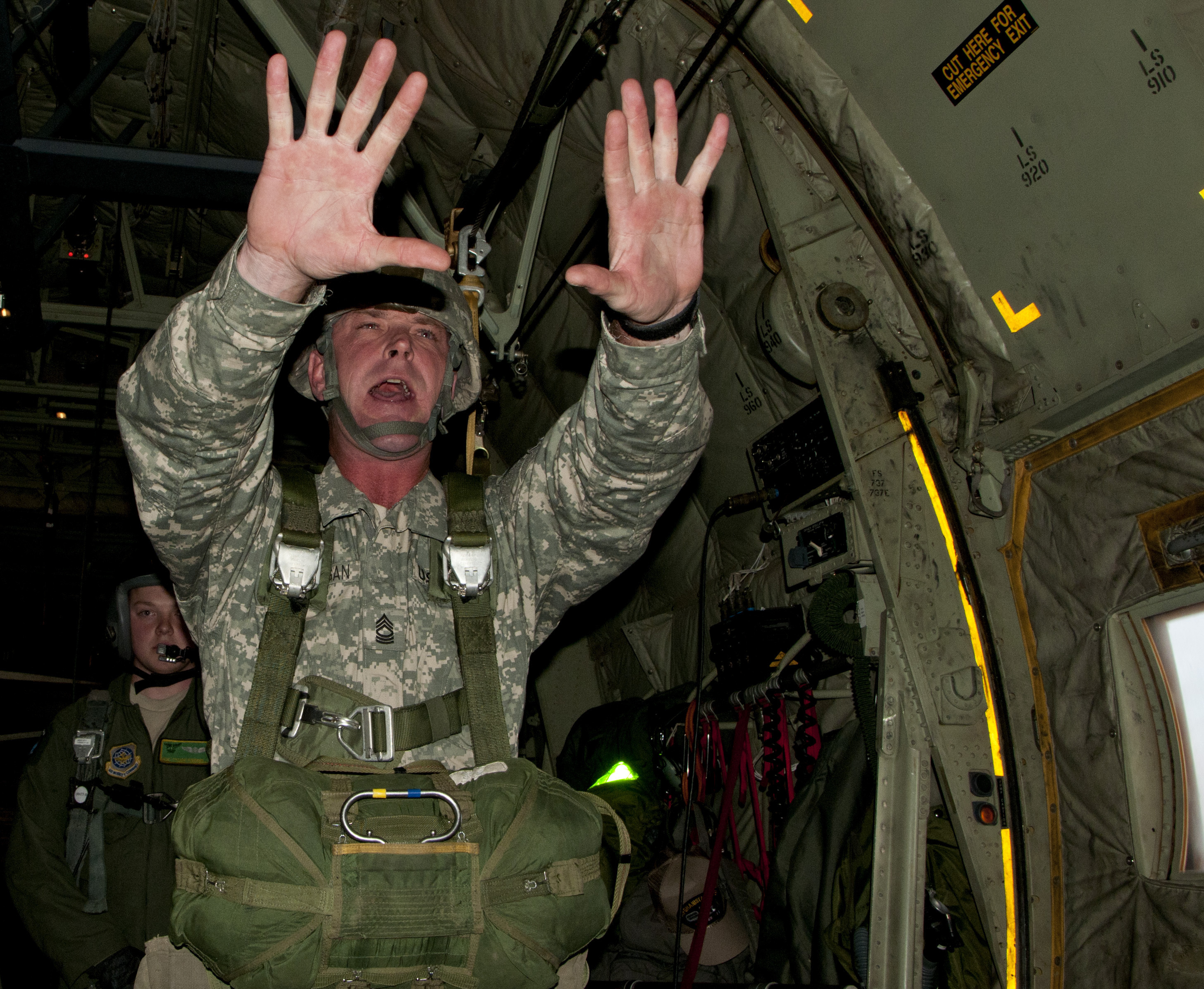
A jumpmaster starts the PWAC sequence by giving his paratroopers the "ten-minutes" command as he begins to prepare them to exit the aircraft

During the above stated activities a fellow Jumpmaster acts as his Safety and assists primarily with Practical Work In Aircraft (PWAC). In addition to the roles of Jumpmaster and Safety, a Jumpmaster may be called upon to act as the Drop Zone Safety Officer (DZSO) or Departure Airfield Control Officer (DACO). The DZSO inserts into the drop zone prior to the jump and is on hand with the pathfinder team to aid the drop aircraft in navigation. The DACO works at the airfield which the jumpers are lifting off from and functions as a liaison with the US Air Force.

During major airborne operations, a Jumpmaster known as the Drop Zone Support Team Leader (DZSTL) plays an important role in the operation. The DZSTL represents both the airlift commander and the ground forces commander. He has overall responsibility for the conduct of operations on the Drop Zone (DZ). Considering flight safety as well as ground safety, the DZSTL coordinates closely with the DZ safety officer to observe and evaluate all factors that could adversely affect the safety of the airdrop operation. If radio contact is possible, the DZSTL will pass surface wind information and limited weather observations to inbound aircraft and units, as required. When radio contact is not possible, the DZSTL must ensure DZ markings are properly displayed as pre-briefed to convey the appropriate message to aircrews. The DZST must have radio contact with the drop aircraft for several types of drops.

The DZSTL must also evaluate the condition of the DZ before the drop to ensure that it is suitable for a safe personnel landing, as well as to ensure that airdropped equipment can be recovered. The DZSTL places personnel, vehicles, and support equipment so they are not endangered by the airdrop. (Possible parachute malfunction should be considered when determining placement.) He also ensures the DZ is clear of all personnel and equipment not required to support the airdrop no later than 10 minutes before the estimated time over target.

The DZSTL is responsible for the operation of all visual acquisition aids and electronic equipment, such as smoke, flares, signal lights, and radios. He ensures that this equipment is not used by untrained personnel. If conditions are not safe for a successful airdrop, the DZSTL uses pre-briefed visual signals or radio communications to ensure that the no-drop condition is made known to the incoming aircraft.

The DZSO is a key member of what is referred to as a Drop Zone Support Team. The difference in the required duties of the DZSO as opposed to the DZSTL is tied to whether or not the mission is supported by an Air Force Combat Control Team.

==== Jumpmaster training ====
The U.S. Army Jumpmaster School at Fort Benning, Georgia and the U.S. Army Advanced Airborne School at Fort Bragg, North Carolina are the U.S. Army's primary schools for training jumpmasters across the U.S. Department of Defense.
