= Pathfinder Badge (United States) =

U.S. Army award

- Type: Badge
- Awarded for: Completion of the U.S. Army Pathfinder School or equivalent Course
- Presented by: United States Army
- Status: Currently awarded
- First award: 1964

Precedence
- Next (higher): Explosive Ordnance Disposal Badges
- Next (lower): Air Assault Badge

The Pathfinder Badge is a military badge of the United States Army awarded to soldiers who complete the U.S. Army Sabalauski Air Assault School's Pathfinder Course or the Army National Guard, Warrior Training Center, Mobile Training Team's Pathfinder Course at Fort Campbell, Kentucky (although it was primarily at Fort Benning, Georgia, before being discontinued in 2020).

To be awarded the Pathfinder Badge, the soldier must complete Pathfinder instruction in advanced land navigation, advanced scouting, tactical air traffic control in the field, and the control of parachute operations; the badge is awarded on completing several examinations under field training exercise (FTX) conditions. Examinations include proficiency in sling load rigging and execution, planning and execution of helicopter landing zones (HLZ), air traffic control operations, aerial delivery of troops and supplies, and several others.

The first Pathfinder Badge was designed by Lt. Prescott, a navigator in the 9th Troop Carrier Pathfinder Group (Provisional), in May 1944. Besides the paratroopers who earned it, the Pathfinder Badge was worn by IX Troop Carrier Command air crews who guided paratrooper transports and towed gliders. It was worn four inches above the left sleeve cuff on the service coat.

The current Pathfinder Badge, originally made of felt, was approved on 22 May 1964. The badge began being made of enameled metal on 11 October 1968. The badge's wings symbolize flight and airborne capabilities, while the torch represents leadership and guidance. The torch traces back to the Olympians who carried the torch each year of the event to its location. US Army Pathfinders traditionally were the first to arrive ahead of larger elements to scout and designate areas in which aviation assets could perform their operations during combat.

== See also ==
- Air Assault Badge
- Parachutist Badge
