= T-11 parachute =

American military parachute

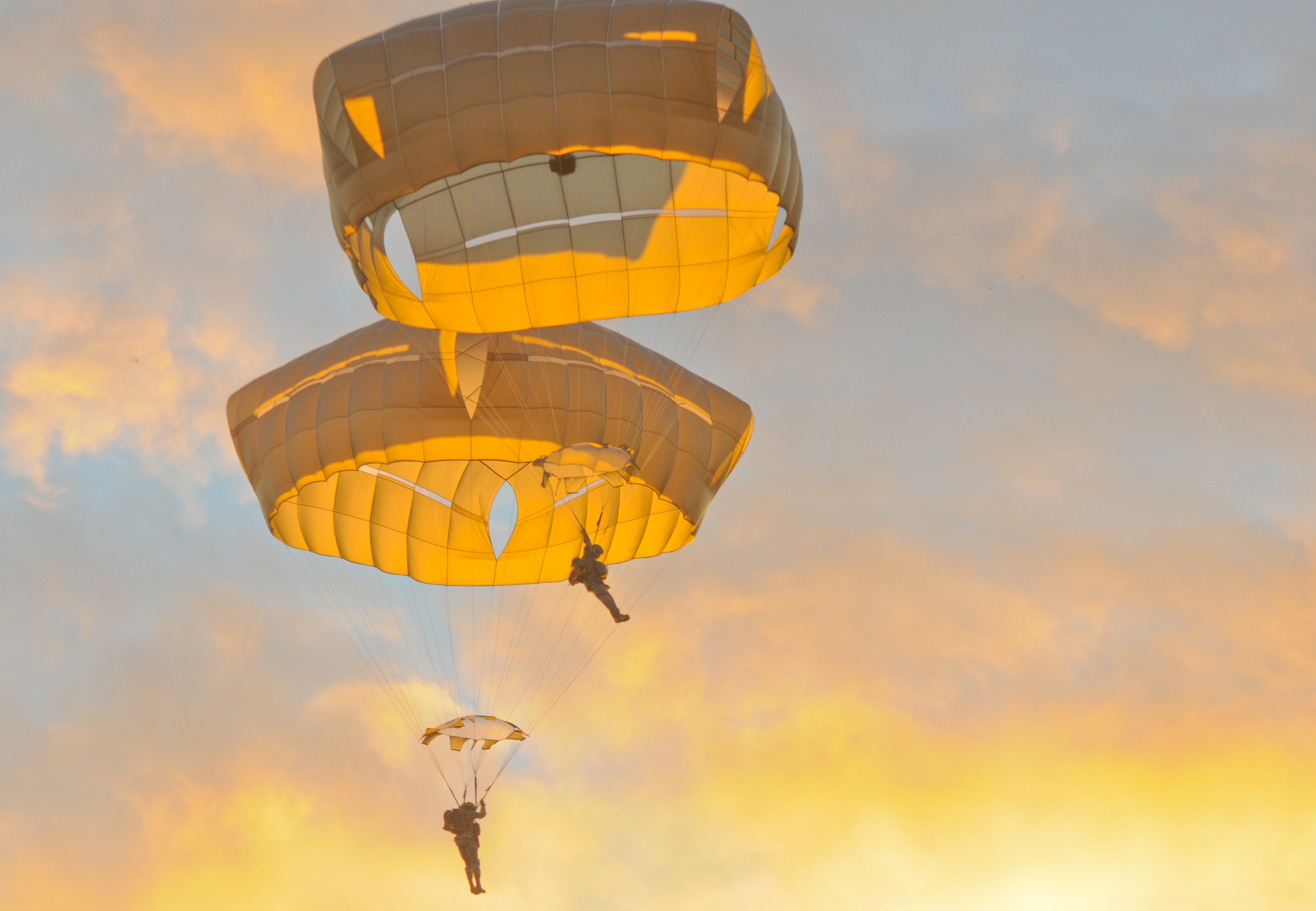
Parachutists utilizing the T-11 parachute

The Non-Maneuverable Canopy (T-11) Personnel Parachute System is the newest personnel parachute system to be adopted by the United States armed forces and the Canadian Army. The T-11 replaces the T-10, introduced in 1955. The T-11 includes a completely redesigned main and reserve parachute and an integrated harness assembly that is suitable for a wider range of soldier weights than the previous system.

== Design ==
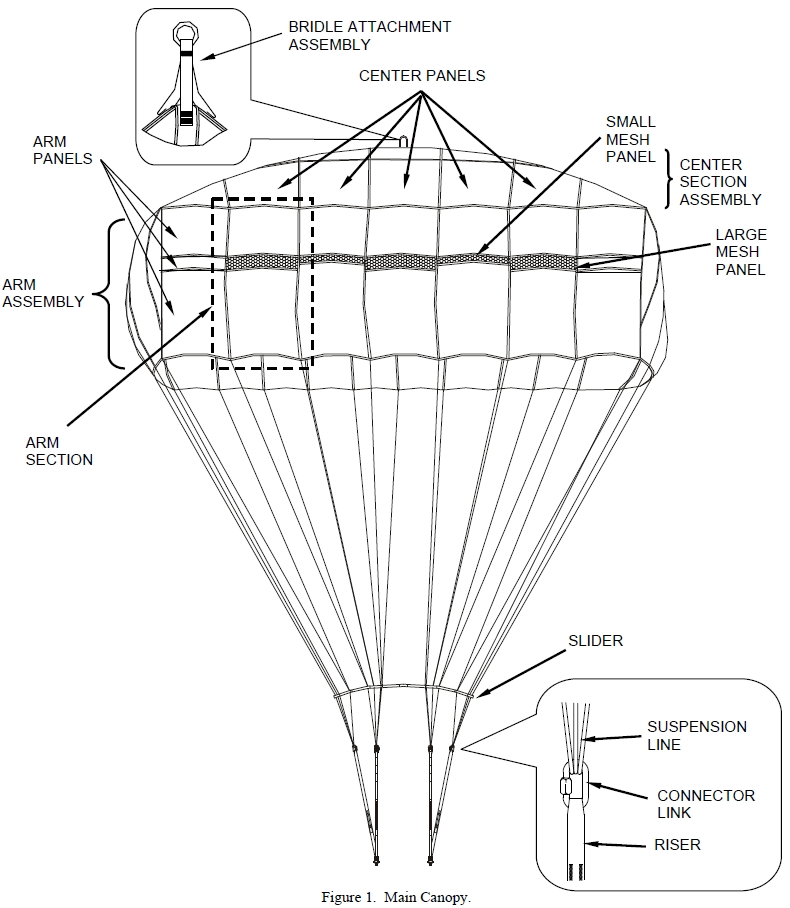
T-11 Main Parachute System design

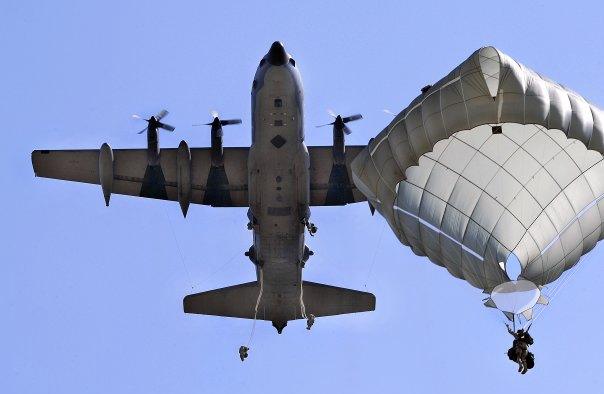
Parachutists jumping from an MC-130 using the T-11 Personnel Parachute System

The main canopy is a modified version of a cross/cruciform platform. The canopy has an increased inflated diameter of 14 percent and a 28 percent increase in surface area, when compared with the T-10D assembly. The T-11 main canopy utilizes a unique deployment sequence to reduce the opening shock and canopy oscillation. The T-11 is designed to have an average rate of descent of 19 feet per second (5.8 m/s) for the 95th percentile service member, compared with 24 feet per second (7.3 m/s) with the T-10C. This reduction is intended to result in significantly lower landing injury rates for jumpers.

The reserve canopy is a derivative of the British Low Level Parachute (LLP) aero-conical design that includes apex scoop pockets at the top of the reserve canopy and skirt assist lines at the system's hem to promote fast opening of the reserve system during low-speed malfunctions. Unlike the current reserve parachute system, the T-11R reserve uses an omni-directional, center-pull deployment system. The T-11 harness is designed to displace opening shock forces of the reserve parachute equally along the long axis of the jumper's body.

The main canopy and harness weighs 38 pounds (17 kg), and the reserve assembly 15 pounds (6.8 kg), for a total of 53 pounds (24 kg). The main canopy is 30.6 feet (9.3 m) inflated diameters at the hem. The reserve canopy has a 24 feet (7.3 m) nominal diameter.

== Use ==
The T-11 parachute is in use by the United States armed forces. It is also being adopted by the Canadian and Finnish Defence Forces, first in Europe. It is in use with the Australian Army.

The system is authorized and certified for use on the Globemaster, Hercules and Chinook aircraft.

== History ==
During testing led by the US Army's Airborne and Special Operations Test Directorate, the 2nd Brigade Special Troops Battalion of the 82nd Airborne Division conducted the first mass tactical jump using the T-11 parachute.

On July 12, 2011, the U.S. Army temporarily suspended use of all T-11 parachutes following a malfunction-related fatality at Fort Bragg, North Carolina. Incident investigators found potential issues with the packing, inspection, quality control and function of T-11 parachutes. Secretary of the Army John McHugh ordered that usage of the T-11 be suspended until a further investigation was completed and any necessary changes made. This ban was lifted on August 4, 2011.

On May 30, 2014, another fatality occurred involving the T-11 parachute during a nighttime jump at the Fort Bragg, North Carolina, Holland Drop Zone. The investigation found that the main contributing factor in the accident was the jumpmaster's failure to check the paratrooper's equipment prior to the jump, and the Army implemented policy changes as a result.

On July 14, 2016, Sgt. Arturo Godinez Valenzuela, 31, a paratrooper from the Mexican Army, died using the T-11 parachute in an 82nd Airborne Division training exercise at Fort Bragg. The cause of death was multiple blunt force injuries during a high-elevation fall.
