= T-10 parachute =

Series of static line-deployed parachutes

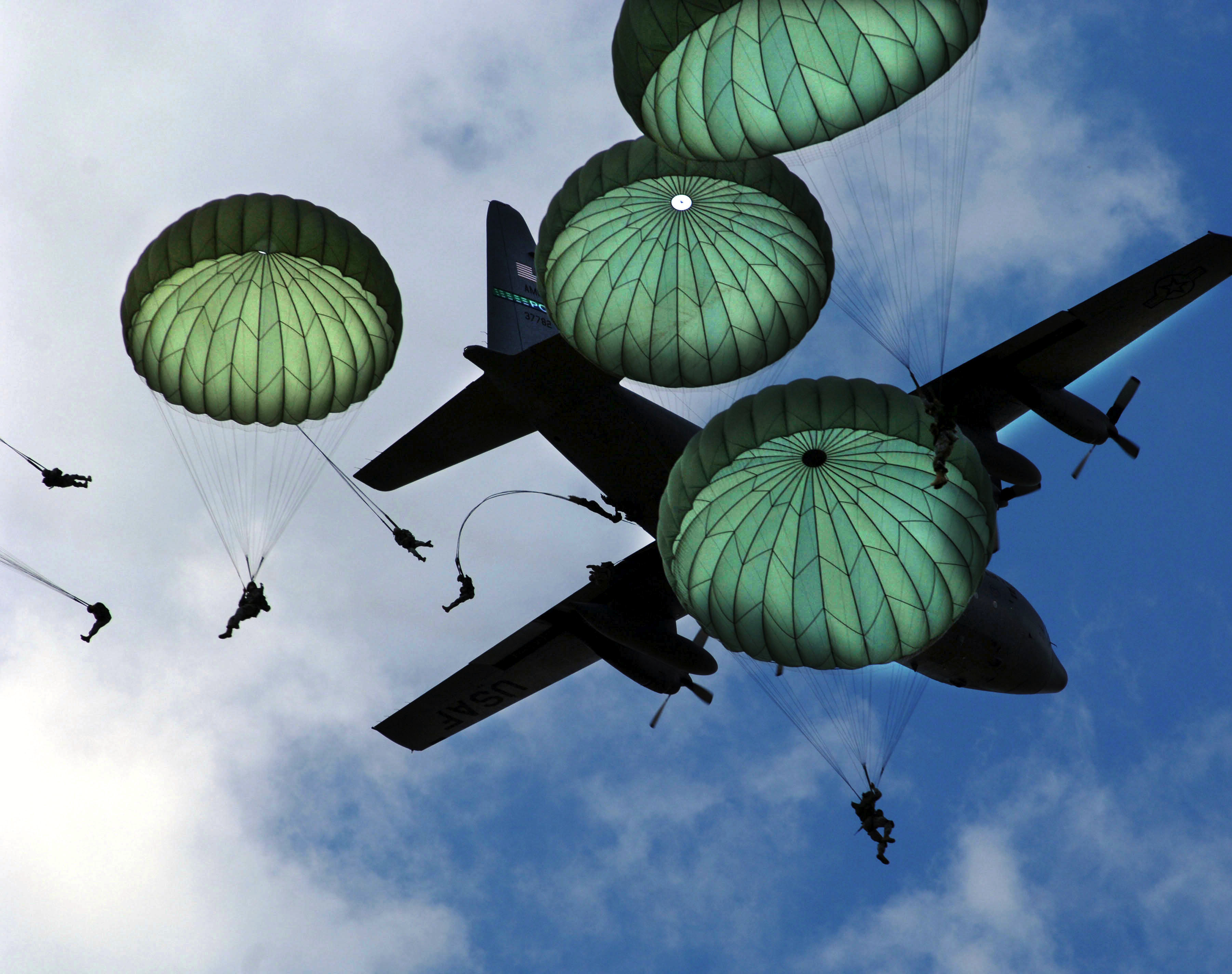
US Army paratroopers utilizing the T-10D Parachute during an airborne operation from a C-130.

The T-10 Parachute is a series of static line-deployed parachutes used by the militaries for combat mass-assault airborne operations and training. The T-10 parachute was introduced in the early 1950s. In 1976, the B model introduced the anti-inversion net; in 1986, the C model was introduced, which changed the pocket band free length from 4" to 7½". The T-10D, adopted in 2000, includes the detachable pack tray, which in itself includes the 15' universal static line and 5' extension static line. The T-10D is currently being replaced by the T-11 parachute system. In 2006, all T-10C parachutes were revised by adding one static line stow bar to each side of the pack tray; the material for the T-10C was also changed to the Army's Foliage Green #504.

== Design ==
Depending upon air density and the jumper's total weight, the parachute's average rate of descent is from 22 to 24 feet per second (6.7 to 7.3 m/s); total suspended weight limitation is 360 pounds (160 kg). The parachute is deployed using either a 15 or 20 feet (4.6 or 6.1 m) static line, allowing the parachutist to be delivered by either C-130 or C-17 aircraft. The T-10D main parachute is a parabolic-shape and has a nominal diameter of 35 feet (11 m) with 30 suspension lines. The entire assembly weighs 31 pounds (14 kg). Paratroopers can be dropped from an aircraft at a maximum speed of 173 mph (150 kn), at a minimum height of 500 ft (150 m). Maximum jump wind speed is 15 mph (13 kn).

The T-10D Parachute assembly consists of five components: pack tray, troop harness, deployment bag, risers, and canopy. The parachute has a combined service life of 16.5 years; service life is 12 years and shelf life is 4.5 years. The T-10D Parachute must be repacked every 120 days. The T-10D Parachute is made of nylon materials commonly used in the manufacturing of parachutes.

The Modified Improved Reserve Parachute System (MIRPS) includes a standard T-10 reserve parachute canopy assembly, integrated with a commercial deployment assistance device composed of a bridle line, pilot parachute, and spring. The pack tray includes a line bag for stowing suspension lines and an inner staging flap that holds the reserve parachute until sufficient tension is achieved through the bridle/pilot parachute assembly during deployment. The MIRPS pack tray is slightly larger than that of the T-10 reserve pack tray so it can accommodate a larger pilot chute, spring, and bridle. The pack tray has a yellow stripe along the rip cord protector flap and is made of nylon textile materials commonly used to make parachute systems.

There are derivates using this general design, like the MC1-1B parachute. The basic canopy is the same as the T-10B assembly, except that there are orifices or cut-out areas in 11 of the 30 gores, creating a gliding type descent. The canopy has two control lines, each extending from an outboard orifice to toggles which may be manipulated in such a way as to make 360° turns. It has a 3 3/4inch mesh anti-inversion net attached to the skirt of the canopy that extends 18- inches below the canopy shirt.
