= United States Army Pathfinder School =

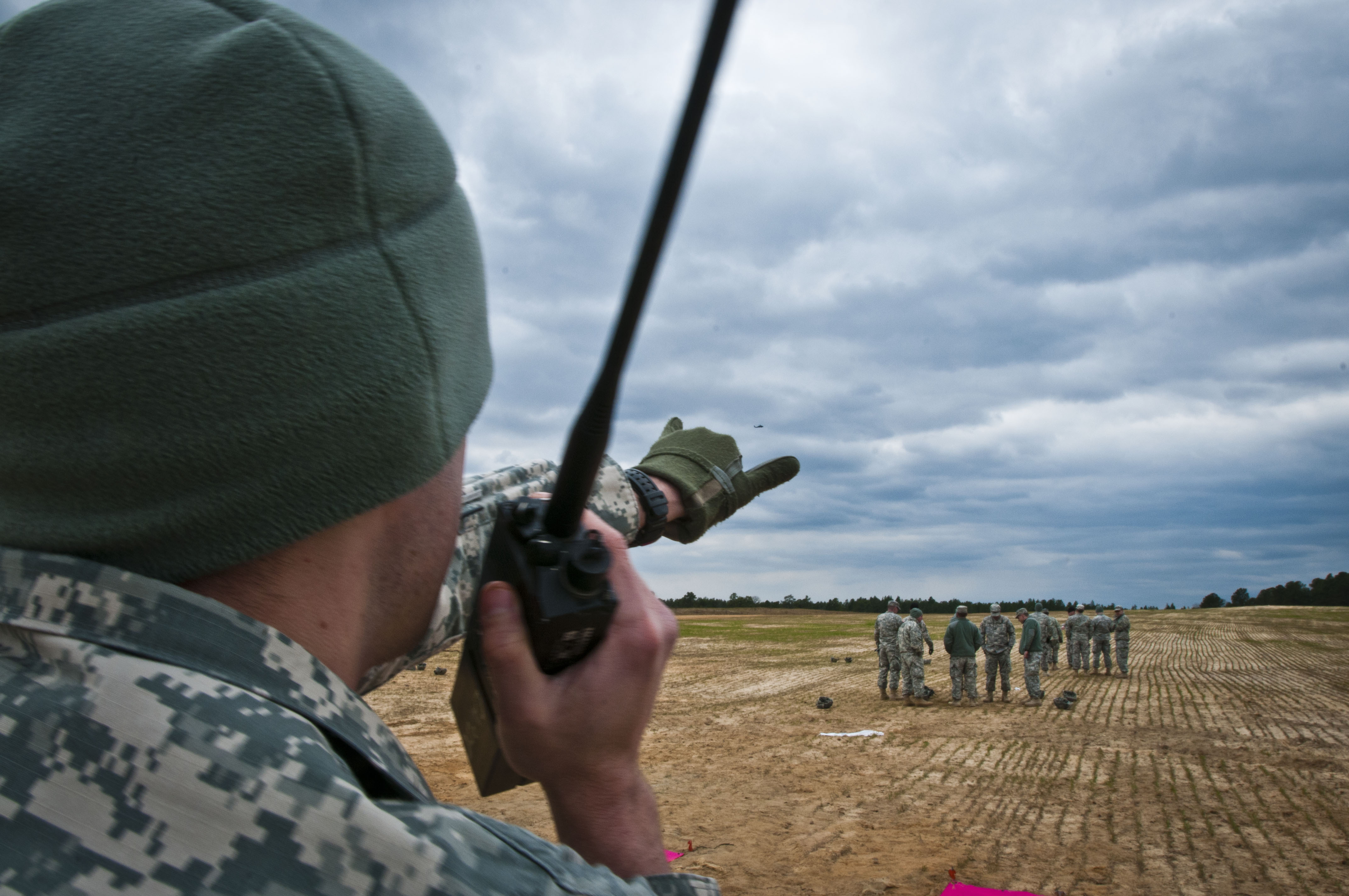
- A Pathfinder directs an aircraft onto a drop zone at Fort Bragg, North Carolina.
- Active: 1943 – present
- Country: United States
- Branch: United States Army
- Type: Military training
- Role: Special skills training
- Part of: Army National Guard Warrior Training Center
- Garrison/HQ: Fort Benning, Georgia
- Mottos: "First In, Last Out"

Insignia
- Headgear worn by special skills instructors, known as "Black Hats"

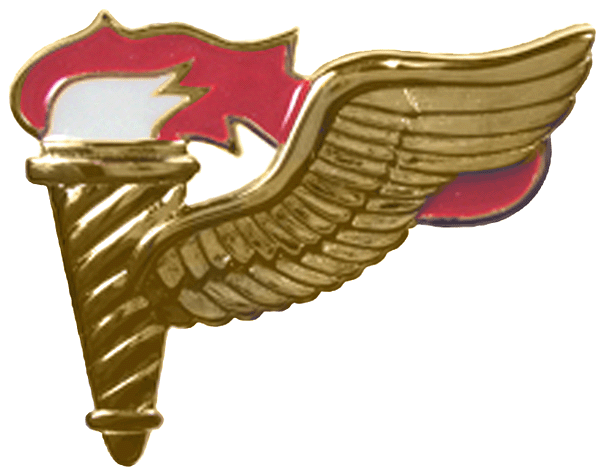
- US Army Pathfinder Badge, awarded upon graduation

Overview of what is learned at the U.S. Army Pathfinder School (2:22)

The United States Army Pathfinder Course trains military personnel in the U.S. Army and its sister services to set up parachute drop zones and helicopter landing zones for airborne and air assault missions.

The two-week course trains Pathfinder candidates to navigate on foot; conduct sling load operations; establish and operate a helicopter landing zone; provide air traffic control (ATC) and navigational assistance to rotary-wing and fixed-wing aircraft; and establish and operate parachute drop zones (DZs), including computed air release point (CARP) DZs, ground marked release system (GMRS) DZs and Army verbally initiated release system (VIRS) DZs.

All training and airborne operations are conducted in accordance with FM 3-21.220 (Static Line Parachuting Techniques and Training) and FM 3-21.38 (Pathfinder Operations).

Pathfinder training is conducted by the 101st Airborne Division's Air Assault School at Fort Campbell, Kentucky, and by the Army National Guard Warrior Training Center Mobile Training Team at Fort Benning, Georgia.

== Development of the modern U.S. Army pathfinder ==
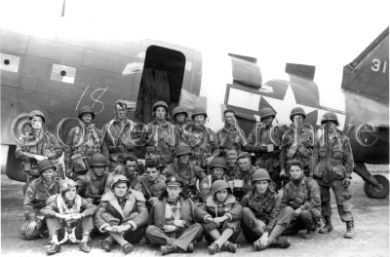
U.S. Army Pathfinders pose in front of a C-47 before boarding the aircraft in order to parachute into France in support of the Normandy landings.

Pathfinders make up less than .01% of the Army. Their primary mission is to set up parachute drop zones and helicopter landing zones for airborne and air assault missions.

The Pathfinders were created in World War II after early airborne operations found it too difficult to find drop zones at night and in bad weather, resulting in scattered drops up to seven miles from the target. An idea from the British inspired the 509th Parachute Infantry Battalion and 504th Parachute Infantry Regiment, 82nd Airborne Division, to create an elite force to go in before the main assault with visual and electronic signaling devices to guide aircraft to the drop zone and gliders to their landing zones. Their first use in combat was 13 September 1943 during combat jumps into Italy.

WWII-era Pathfinders are most remembered for their jump into Normandy during the invasion of June 6, 1944, when they led Allied forces into Europe. They were employed throughout southern France, the Netherlands, Belgium, and Germany, in the course of Allied airborne operations until the end of the war in Europe. They were also used in the Pacific theater with the 11th Airborne Division during the liberation of the Philippines.

The Korean War saw limited use of the Pathfinders by the 187th Airborne Regimental Combat Team during two combat jumps and operations. The Vietnam War saw the largest use of Pathfinders due to the developments of helicopter insertion and resupply which were pioneered by the 11th Air Assault Division (Test). Nearly every Army aviation battalion had a Pathfinder detachment and deployed them on nearly every mission.

After the Vietnam War, Pathfinders were embedded in the major Airborne units and various combat aviation battalions and groups. The Army National Guard and Army Reserve added Pathfinder platoons during the 1970s and 1980s. Many conducted joint task force missions in Latin America, Europe, and the Middle East.

In the late 1980s, the Army began closing Pathfinder units, believing their skills could be taught to regular troops at Air Assault School and by people within the unit who were Pathfinder-qualified. Operations during the 1989 Panama invasion and the 1991 Gulf War showed that Pathfinders were important to airborne success and that the Army needed more of them. The 101st Airborne Division (Air Assault), which had retained a Pathfinder unit during and after the Vietnam War, expanded its existing company, then in 2005 converted its long-range surveillance detachment (LRSD) into a second Pathfinder company, giving each of its two aviation brigades a company. The 82nd Airborne Division followed suit by converting its LRSD to a Pathfinder company under the 2d Battalion, 82nd Aviation Regiment. The 10th Mountain Division (Light Infantry) at Fort Drum, New York, and the 25th Infantry Division in Hawaii have also formed provisional Pathfinder companies (that is, they are not reflected in the units' tables of organization and equipment) for combat operations in Iraq and Afghanistan.

In 2015, the Army had five Pathfinder companies in 2015. On 15 May, the 101st Airborne inactivated its 159th Combat Aviation Brigade, including the brigade's Pathfinder company. The 101st CAB was redesignated the CAB, 101st Airborne, bringing it in line with other non-numbered divisional CABs, and the division assumed the same organizational structure as the light infantry 10th Mountain Division.

2016 saw the inactivation of three companies: the provisional Pathfinder company in the 25th Infantry Division, the remaining Pathfinder company in the 101st Airborne Division in a 2 August 2016 ceremony at Fort Campbell, and the provisional company in the 10th Mountain Division by October 2016.

The last Pathfinder unit in the Army, a company authorized by MTOE in the 82d Airborne Division, was inactivated in a ceremony on 24 February 2017 at Simmons Army Airfield at Fort Bragg.

For decades, the Army trained Pathfinders at the Pathfinder School at Fort Benning, Georgia. The school was closed after an October 2020 decision to shutter more than 30 schools and courses. A spokesman from the U.S. Army Training and Doctrine Command (TRADOC) said the school was closing to save money and help the Army shift to large-scale combat operations.

As of 2023, the Pathfinder Course is conducted by the 101st Airborne Division's Air Assault School at Fort Campbell and by the Army National Guard Warrior Training Center Mobile Training Team.

== Pathfinder School ==
=== Applicants ===
Pathfinder students are drawn primarily from the Army, but its sister services send students as well. An assignment in a billet requiring Pathfinder skills is generally required. In the Army, prospective students would most likely be assigned to units requiring their skills, such as the 82nd and 101st Airborne and 10th Mountain Divisions. In the U.S. Navy, U.S. Air Force, and U.S. Marine Corps, prospective students would most likely be assigned to a unit conducting drop-zone operations, helicopter operations, or special operations units.

All applicants must have passed a physical examination within five years, have a minimum profile of 111121, have no speech impediment, have passed the APFT within the last six months and meet the Army height and weight standards in accordance with AR 600-9.

Physicals for airborne qualified personnel must indicate "cleared to participate in airborne operations".

Applicants must have six months of service remaining on active duty upon completion of the course.

Officers who apply must be Active Army, reserve, or National Guard officers in ranks O–1 through O-3 assigned to a billet documented with the skill identifier "5Q" indicating a requirement to possess Pathfinder skills in the most recent personnel management authorization document or updated authorization document. Attendance is restricted to officers in the following branches:

- Infantry
- Armor
- Engineers
- Military Intelligence
- Multifunctional Logistician

Enlisted soldiers who apply must be Active Army, reserve or National Guard soldiers in grades E–3 through E–7 who have an Armed Services Vocational Aptitude Battery–General Technical score of 110 or above, and are from the following military occupational specialties:

- Infantryman
- Indirect Fire Infantryman
- Fire Support Specialist
- Air Traffic Control Operator
- Cavalry Scout
- Motor Transport Operator
- Parachute Rigger
- Unit Supply Specialist

Other services: Active and reserve U.S. Marine Corps officers in the grades of O–1 through O–3 and enlisted personnel in the grades of E–4 through E–7 in logistics and combat arms may attend. Active and reserve U.S. Air Force enlisted personnel serving as combat control team/forward air controllers in the grades of E–5 thought E–7 may attend.

Foreign students: Applicants must have a signed letter of intent, a waiver from HQDA, and U.S. government release for training. Units that sponsor foreign students must ensure they meet all course prerequisites before reporting for Pathfinder training.

=== Instructors ===
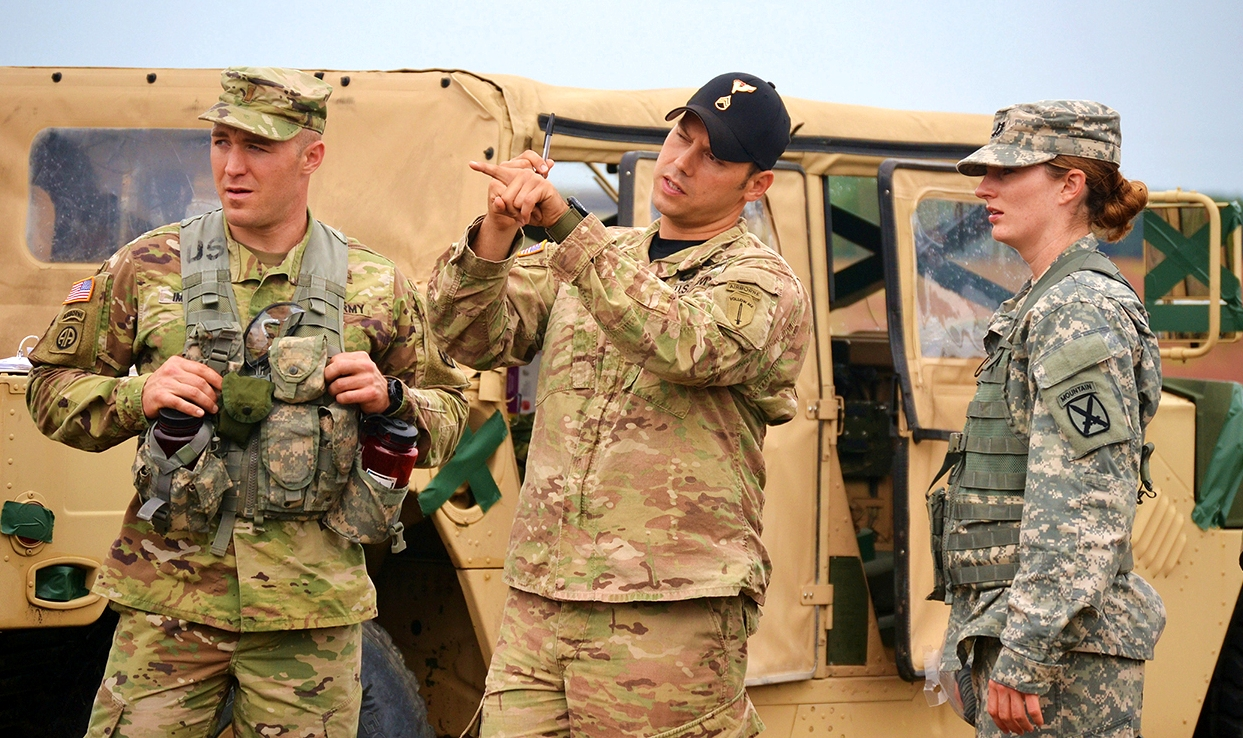
A special skills instructor, known as a "Black Hat", demonstrates a quick method to determine the height of an obstacle on a landing zone.

Instructors at the U.S. Army Pathfinder School are the famed the Black Hats, named for the black baseball caps they wear as a part of their garrison uniform. The Black Hat is a symbol of expertise, awarded to Airborne, Jumpmaster, and Pathfinder instructors who are certified to teach others how to conduct airborne operations.

=== Course ===
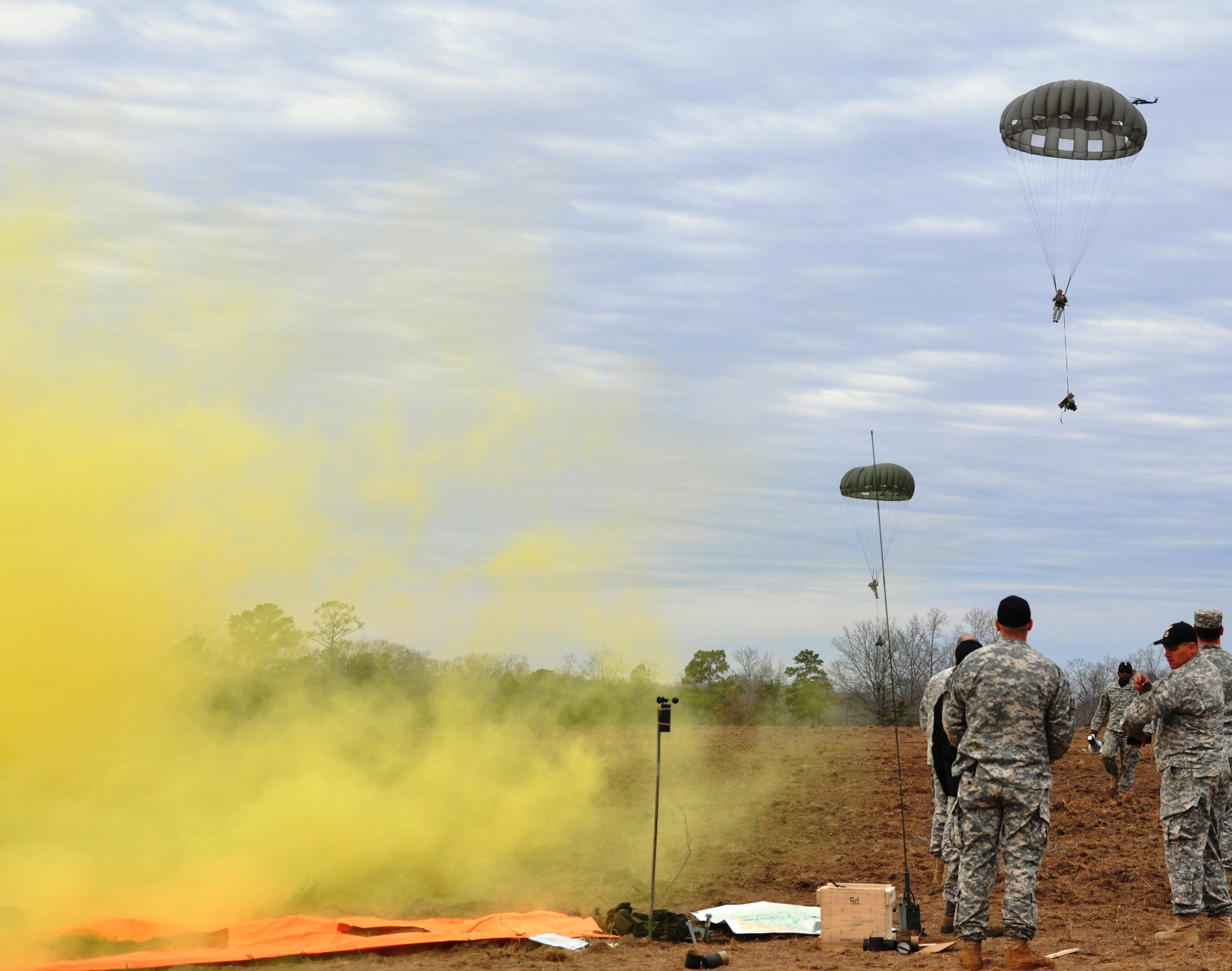
"Black Hats" release colored smoke to show their students the wind drift on a parachute drop zones they have established.

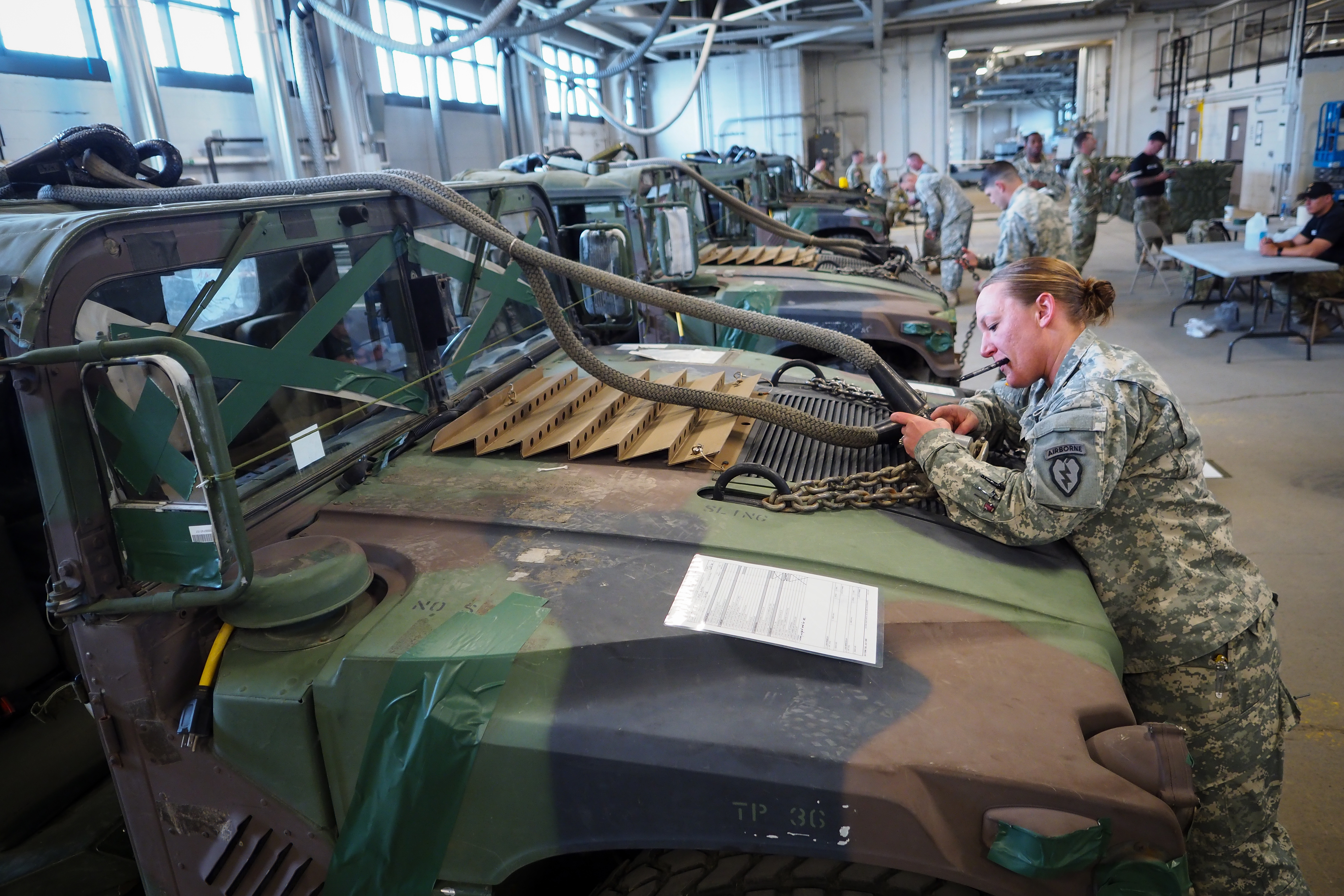
A Pathfinder student inspects the readiness of a U.S. Army HMMWV for sling loading.

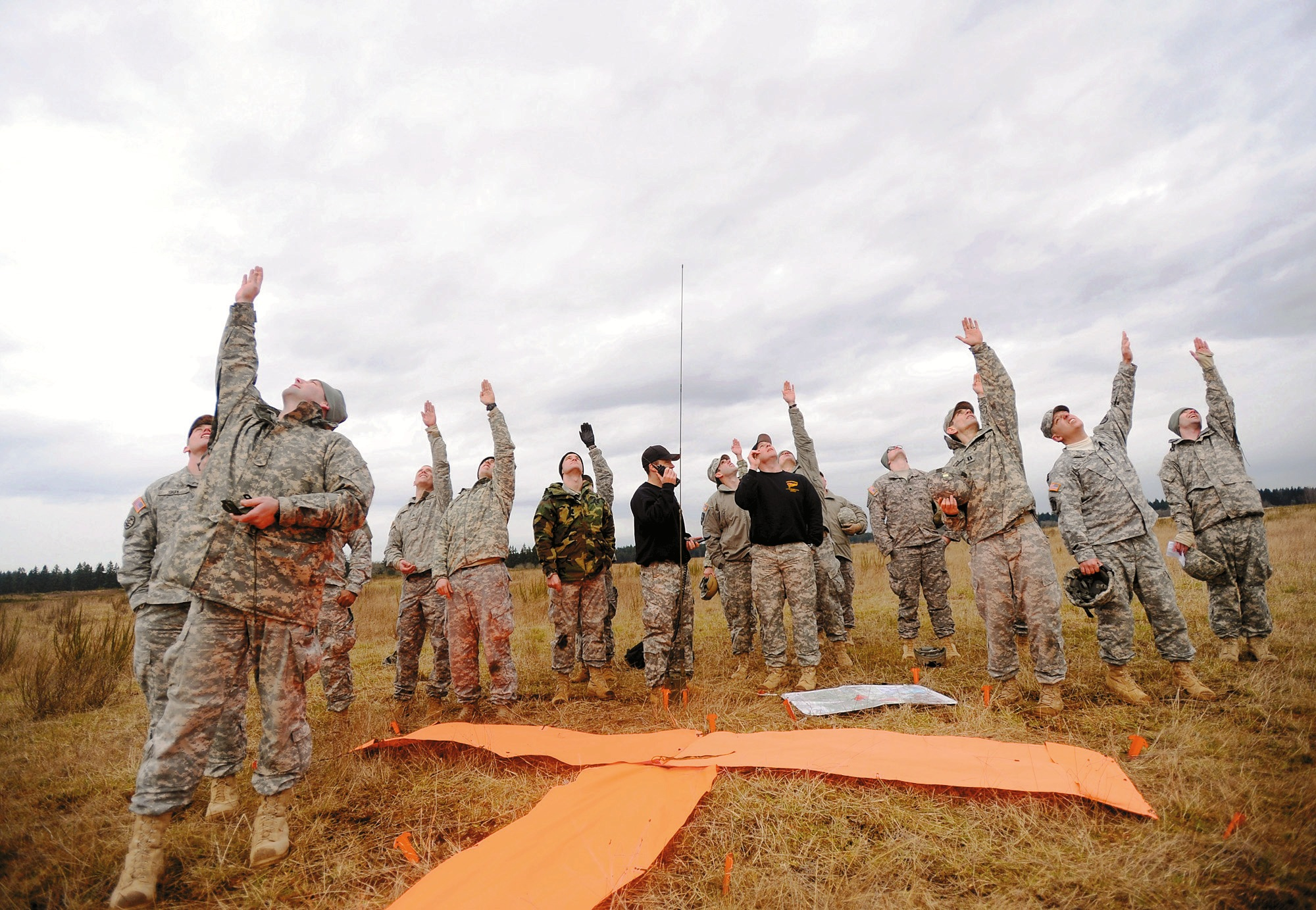
"Black Hats" instruct pathfinder students how to line up a flight path for rotary-wing aircraft.

Pathfinder School is divided into 3 phases, each lasting 3-4 days and culminating in a written and/or hands-on exam. Students must achieve a 70% or higher to pass each exam. After completing all three phases, students will participate in a field training exercise where they put their skills to the test. Formerly a 3-week course, it has been condensed into two weeks.

==== Phase 1: Sling Loads ====
Students receive Pathfinder orientation. Students begin learning sling load nomenclature, aircraft capabilities and sling load theory. Pathfinder students identify nomenclature, air capabilities and deficiencies. A written nomenclature test and a written sling load test will be given. A hands-on inspection of four different sling loads will be conducted where each Pathfinder student will clearly define each deficiency within the time limit.

==== Phase 2: Helicopter Landing Zones ====
Students will be taught how to establish and operate HLZ/PZs, how to plan and execute an air movement, and general air traffic control procedures. This phase concludes with a written exam.

==== Phase 3: Drop Zones ====
Students will be taught to establish day/night DZs (CARP, GMRP, and VIRS) for the insertion of personnel and equipment. Students will understand the 8 selection factors for selecting a drop zone and the duties and responsibilities of the drop zone support team leader (DZSTL). Students will complete the Basic Airborne Refresher (if applicable) and will be taught how to perform the duties of the GTA during a VIRS drop. Students will also receive basic instruction on drop zone survey techniques. This phase concludes with a written exam.

==== Field Training Exercise ====
Students will demonstrate their new skills during the Field Training Exercise, or FTX, during which they are evaluated as a team leader/assistant team leader and ground-to-air/internal net recorder. Students must demonstrate proficiency in all areas of pathfinder operations and meet all graduation requirements.

=== Graduation ===
Graduates from the U.S. Army Pathfinder School are awarded the Pathfinder Badge.

The Col. Robert L. Howard Award is awarded to the Distinguished Honor Graduate of the Pathfinder class, with the highest overall grade point average with first-time "gos" in every event.

The title of Instructor of the Cycle is awarded to the instructor whom students and fellow instructors vote had the greatest positive impact during training.

== See also ==
- U.S. Army Air Assault School
- U.S. Army Airborne School
- U.S. Army Jumpmaster School
- U.S. Military Free-Fall School
- U.S. Air Force Combat Control Team
