= Steel beach picnic =

US Navy barbecue on ship deck

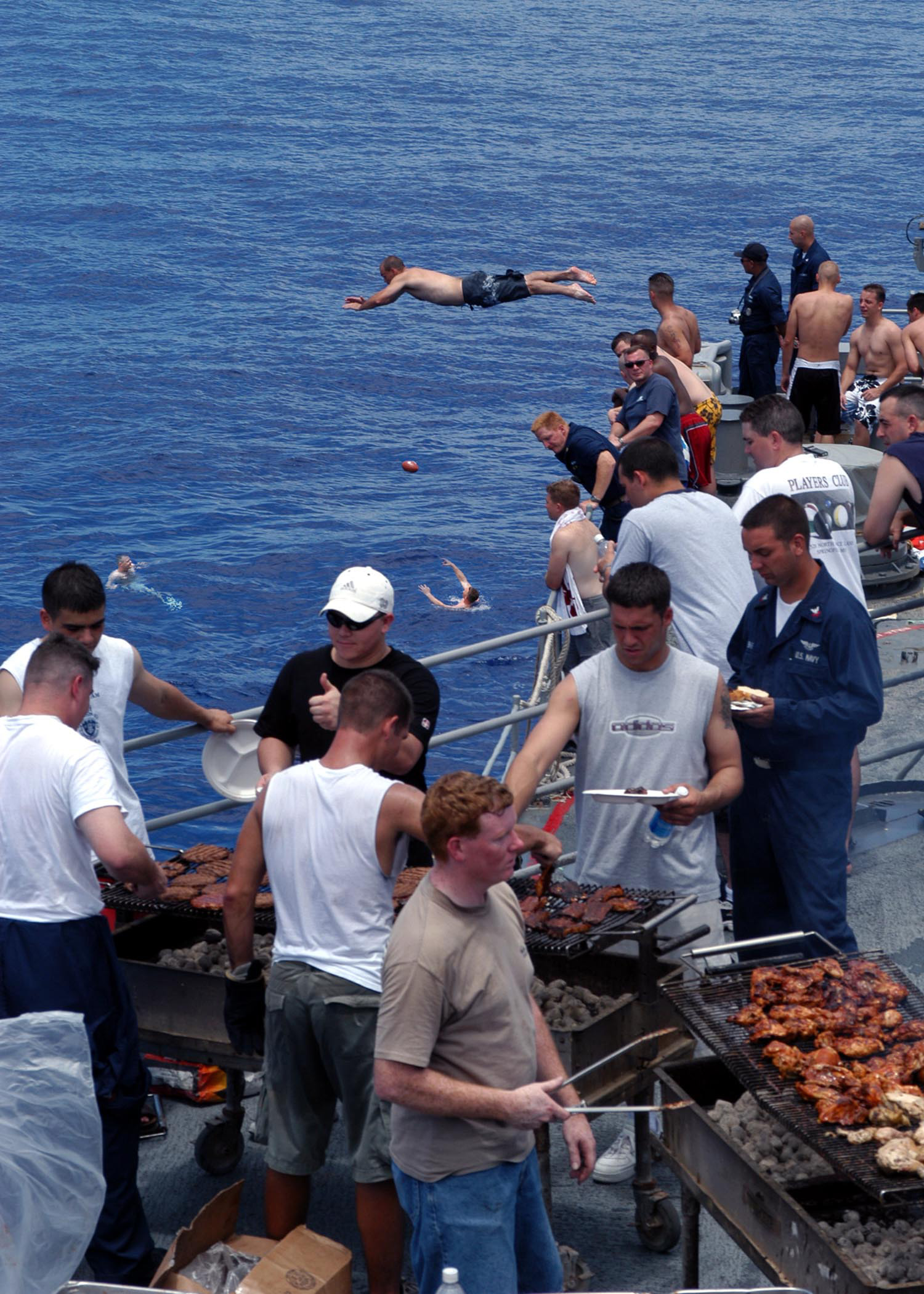
A steel beach picnic aboard the USS Antietam (CG 54) in 2003.

A steel beach picnic or steel beach party is a tradition in the United States Navy. Such events are often department-sponsored barbecues held on the deck of the ship, hence the name "steel beach". They are often held on the flight deck or in a large hangar bay for carriers, much like a day at the beach with volleyball and other sporting events.

== See also ==
- Beer day
- Blood wings
- Line-crossing ceremony
- Roof stomp
