= BRL (disambiguation) =

BRL is the currency code for the Brazilian real.

BRL may also refer to:

- Ballistic Research Laboratory, a United States Army organization
- Brisbane Rugby League, the predecessor to the Queensland Cup rugby league competition in Queensland, Australia
- BRL V6, a Dutch car racing competition
- BRL Light, a Dutch car racing competition
- Southeast Iowa Regional Airport (IATA airport code: BRL), a public airport near Burlington, Iowa
- Burlington, Iowa (Amtrak station), United States; Amtrak station code BRL
- Bristol Robotics Laboratory, a UK robotics facility
- Barge, Refrigerated, Large, a type of United States Navy ship colloquially known as an ice cream barge

== See also ==
- Braille the method of reading and writing system that can be read without sight
