= Blood wings =

US Army traditional initiation rite

Blood wings is a traditional initiation rite that is endured by many graduates of the United States Army Airborne School and the United States Army Air Assault School and sometimes practiced in other military training environments, including the Army Aviation and Aviation Logistics community. It is called blood pinning in the United States Marine Corps. Although it is rare, some Air Force Academy cadets receive their upper-class Prop and Wings insignia via the blood wings tradition.

Upon receiving the Parachutist Badge, an instructor or comrade of the graduate places the pins of the badge pointing into the chest of the graduate. The badge is then slammed against the graduate's chest, resulting in the pins being driven into the flesh. If the graduation is affiliated with a particular unit number (unit 14, for example), then the pin will often be pounded deeper into the muscle the same number of times (14 times in this case).

The origins of this tradition are unknown, but most likely date back to World War II paratrooper training. This practice is fairly secretive and sparked controversy recently when knowledge of it reached the public, which is often critical about painful forms of hazing. Blood wings are against Armed Forces Policy and are prohibited. Some recipients of blood wings say they consider it an honorable rite of passage.

== See also ==
- Line crossing ceremony
- Roof stomp
- Steel beach picnic
