= Domain of the Golden Dragon =

Unofficial award for crossing the 180th Meridian

An example of the certificate that was given to a member of the US military in 1951.

The Domain of the Golden Dragon, Realm of the Golden Dragon, Imperial Order of the Golden Dragon, or Sacred Order of the Golden Dragon, is an unofficial award given to crew members of ships which cross the International Date Line.

A sailor enters the dragon's empire when they cross the International Date Line by sailing west, where Asian nations celebrate the power of the dragon. The certificate is an unofficial award of the United States Navy and the United States Coast Guard. With the extensive Navy operations in the Far East since (and before) World War II, this passage has become so common that few initiation ceremonies are actually held. But the certificate, decorated with Chinese-style dragon, is still given out. It is also awarded to dependents travelling together with their Military Sponsor. This certificate was not only available to American sailors and other military branch members, but was also available to British Sailors when crossing the international date line. The British copies were printed by Gale & Polden Ltd. Portsmouth, England.

== See also ==
- Line-crossing ceremony
