= Fort Campbell =

United States Army installation

Coordinates: 36°39′N 87°28′W

- Oak Grove, Kentucky / Clarksville, Tennessee
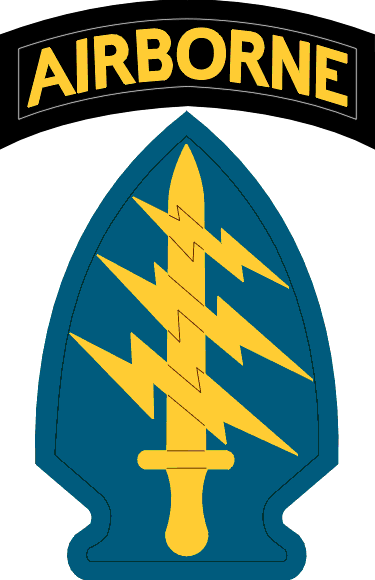
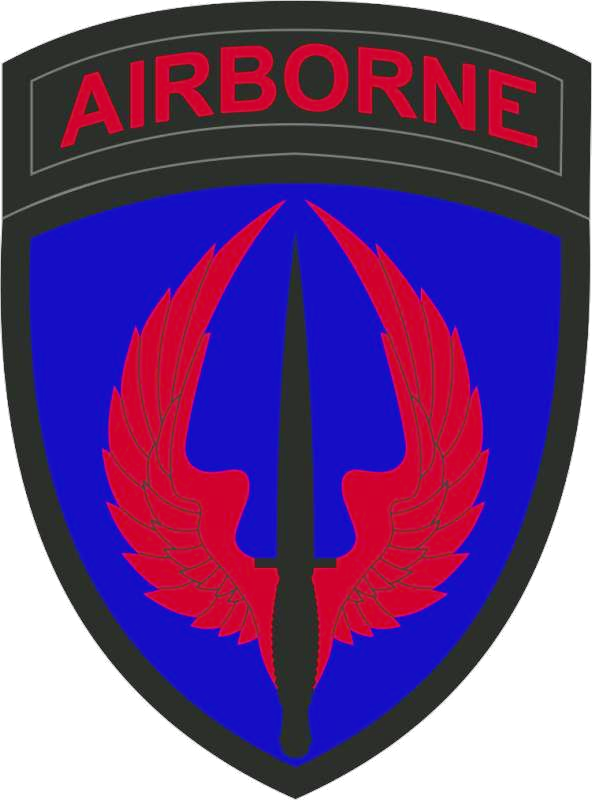
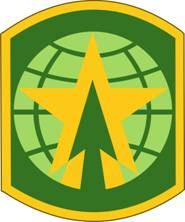
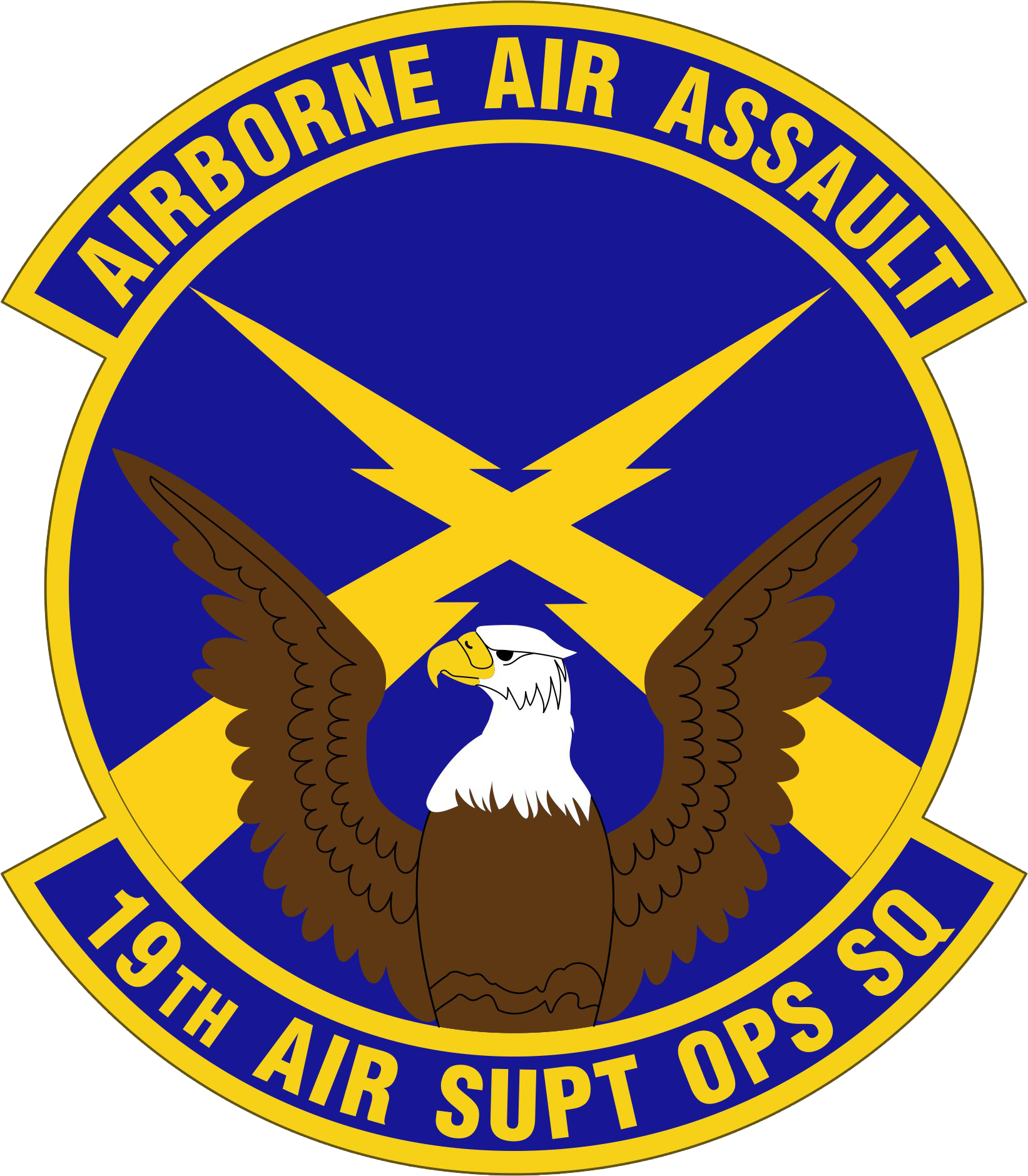
- Insignia of military units stationed at Fort Campbell

Site information
- Type: Army post
- Controlled by: United States Army

Site history
- Built: 1941
- In use: 1942–present

Garrison information
- Current commander: MG David W. Gardner, USA
- Past commanders: MG John F. Campbell, 101st ABN
- Garrison: 101st Airborne Division; 160th Special Operations Aviation Regiment; 5th Special Forces Group; 52nd Ordnance Group (EOD); 86th Combat Support Hospital; 716th Military Police Battalion; 19th Air Support Operations Squadron (USAF); 63rd Chemical Company; 1000th MP Battalion (CID); Sabalauski Air Assault School; Blanchfield Army Community Hospital; NCO Academy

Fort Campbell is a United States Army installation located between the Kentucky–Tennessee border between Hopkinsville, Kentucky, and Clarksville, Tennessee. Though the base's postal address is nominally listed as being in Kentucky (due to the location of the base's headquarters), the majority of the post itself is physically located across the state line in Tennessee. Fort Campbell is home to the 101st Airborne Division and the 160th Special Operations Aviation Regiment. The fort is named in honor of Union Army Brigadier General William Bowen Campbell, the last Whig governor of Tennessee.

== History ==
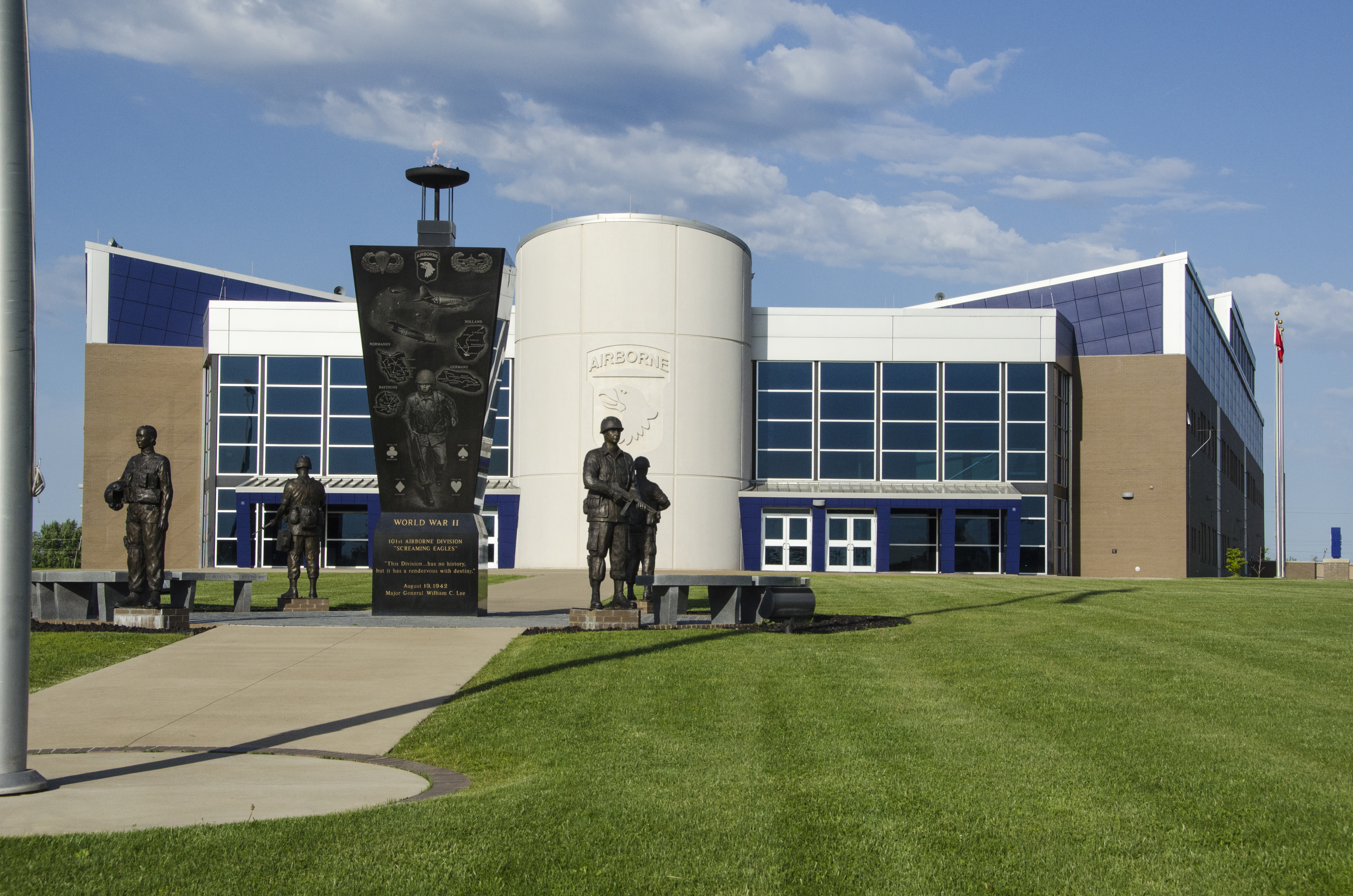
Command and control facility for 101st Airborne Division at Fort Campbell

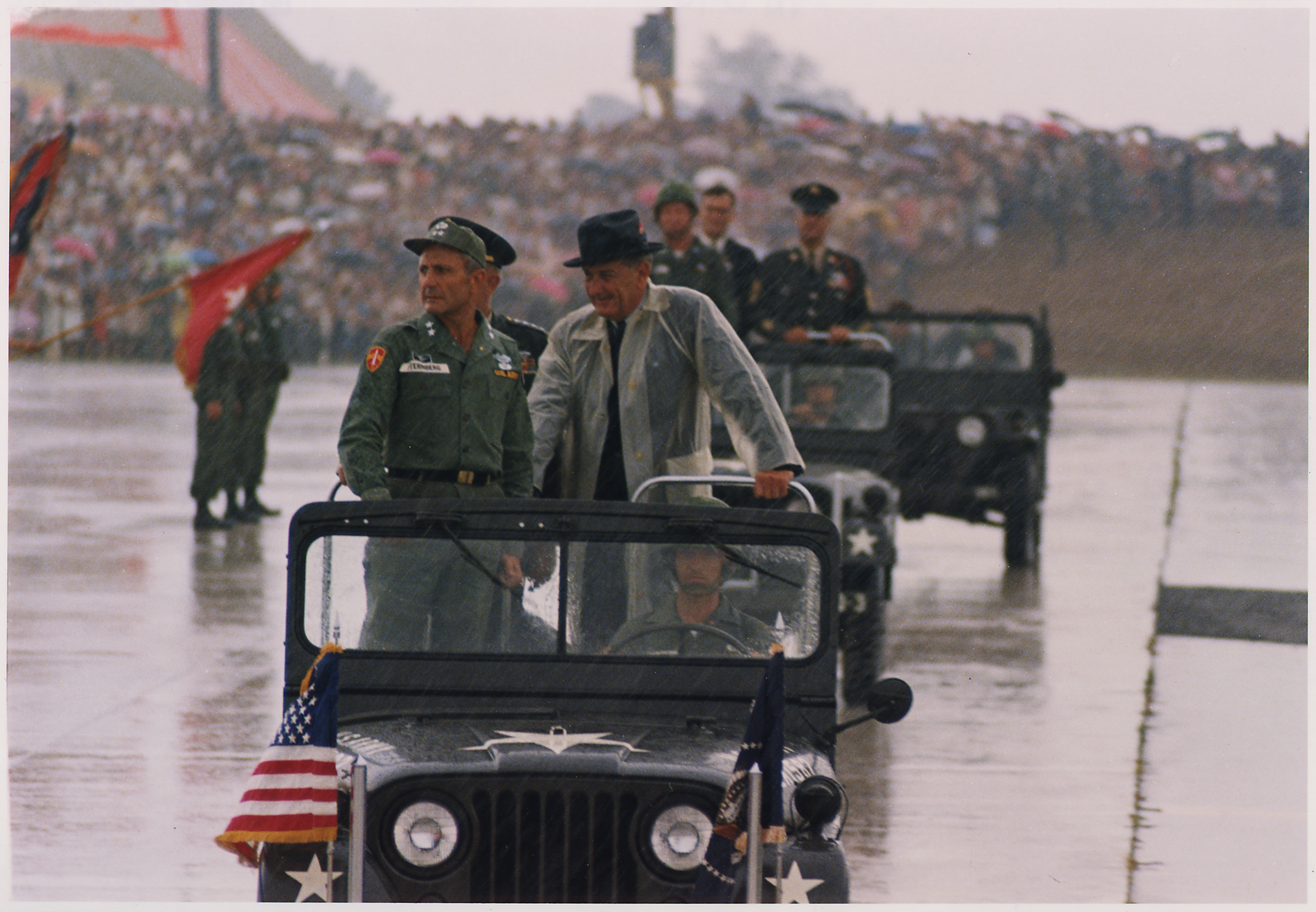
Lyndon B. Johnson and Major General Ben Sternberg at Fort Campbell on July 23, 1966.

The site for Fort Campbell was selected on September 9, 1941, and the Title I Survey was completed November 15, 1941, coincidentally the same time the Japanese Imperial Fleet was leaving Japanese home waters for the attack on Pearl Harbor. Construction of Camp Campbell began on January 12, 1942. Within a year, the reservation designated as Camp Campbell was developed to accommodate one armored division and various support troops, with a total size of 102,414 acres (414 km^{2}), and billets for 2,422 officers and 45,198 enlisted personnel.

Due to its close proximity to Nashville, the War Department on March 7, 1941, designated Tennessee as the official address of the new camp. This caused a great deal of confusion. While the headquarters and a great majority of the base's acreage was in Tennessee, the base's post office was in Kentucky. After many months of mail delivery problems, Colonel Guy W. Chipman requested that the address be changed to Camp Campbell, Kentucky. The War Department officially changed the address on September 23, 1942.

Early in the summer of 1942, the post's initial cadre, one officer and 19 enlisted men, arrived from Fort Knox, Kentucky. From that time until the end of World War II, Camp Campbell was the training ground for the 12th, 14th and 20th Armored divisions, Headquarters IV Armored Corps and the 26th Infantry Division. Several formations were sent to Camp Campbell after the war and deactivated, one being the 5th Infantry Division in September 1946.

In the spring of 1949, the 11th Airborne Division arrived at Campbell following occupation duty in Japan. The 11th was in residence there until early 1956.

By April 1950, the post had evolved from a wartime training camp to a permanent installation and was renamed Fort Campbell.

From 1950 to 1962, the post operated an Airborne Course which trained nearly 30,000 soldiers as paratroopers before its inactivation.

On September 21, 1956, Secretary of the Army Wilber M. Brucker and the Army Chief of Staff, General Maxwell D. Taylor, presented the colors of the 101st Airborne Division to MG T.L. Sherbourne, the first commander of the new, previously experimental, ROTAD (Reorganization Of The Airborne Division) division. This ceremony officially reactivated the famed "Screaming Eagles" of World War II.

On May 2, 1966, Third Army General Order 161 directed the activation of a Basic Combat Training Center at Fort Campbell. On July 6, barely two months after its activation, Fort Campbell's Army Training Center received its first 220 newly inducted soldiers. Basic Combat Training began on schedule July 11 with a full complement of 1,100 trainees. The Training Center operated until April 15, 1972, when it was deactivated.

The 1st Brigade was sent for duty in Vietnam in July 1965. Soon thereafter, upon the escalation of hostilities in Southeast Asia, the rest of the division arrived. Also in response to the military buildup, the 6th Infantry Division was reactivated at Fort Campbell on November 24, 1966, and inactivated July 25, 1968.

In September 1971, the 173rd Airborne Brigade returned to Fort Campbell and conducted its official homecoming ceremonies, which were presided over by Secretary of Defense Melvin Laird. The 173rd was then inactivated on 14 January 1972 and its personnel and the equipment used to rebuild the 3rd Brigade, 101st Airborne Division (Airmobile). The 3rd Brigade remained on jump status until April 1974, when its jump status was terminated and the division became entirely airmobile. On April 6, 1972, the 101st Airborne Division (Airmobile) was officially welcomed back to its home station after the cessation of hostilities in Vietnam. The ceremonies were attended by Vice President Spiro T. Agnew and General William C. Westmoreland, Army Chief of Staff.

Fort Campbell had a children's theatre program until it closed down in 1983.

On December 12, 1985, 246 servicemembers died with eight aircrews shortly after takeoff from Gander, Newfoundland, Canada, during a return from peacekeeping duties in Egypt. A memorial grove of trees and monument are near the post museum.

As a result of the tornado outbreak of December 9–10, 2023, about 250 Army families were displaced from their homes. The damage was especially severe in Clarksville, the town outside of the base, where an EF3 tornado with estimated winds of 150 miles per hour (240 km/h) killed 6 people there and in neighbouring areas. There were no reported fatalities among Fort Campbell personnel or their families. Roughly 1,100 Fort Campbell soldiers and family members were without critical services such as water, heat or electricity. Fort Campbell sustained no obvious significant damage.

=== Criminal incidents ===
On July 5, 1999, Private First Class Barry Winchell, 21, of 2nd Battalion, 502nd Infantry Regiment, was bludgeoned to death with a baseball bat in his barracks. The murder was committed by Private Calvin Glover, who was egged on by Specialist Justin Fisher. Apparently the motive was punishing Winchell for falling in love with Calpernia Addams, a transgender showgirl. Winchell died at Vanderbilt University Medical Center in Nashville. Glover was later convicted for the murder, while Fisher was convicted of lesser crimes. Fisher was released to a halfway house in August 2006 and was later released from all custody. Glover received a life sentence and is eligible for parole after 15 years.

On October 13, 2005, Fort Campbell made international headlines when Private Nicholas Mikel opened fire on a group of soldiers training at the base. Private Mikel was arrested soon thereafter and charged with attempted murder. In April 2006 he was convicted of attempted premeditated murder and sentenced to 25 years imprisonment.

On May 29, 2007 a fire broke out on the apartment complex at the station that killed two children, 9 year-old Sam Fagan, and 2 year-old Rebekah Smallwood. It was later revealed it was intentionally set on purpose by their mother, Billi Jo Smallwood, in a botched attempt to collect on her husband's life insurance money as well as getting out of a difficult marriage. She was later convicted of murder and sentenced to 25 years in prison.

=== 2011 tornado ===
Early on April 26, 2011, a strong tornado struck the Campbell Army Airfield at Fort Campbell, destroying one building and causing heavy damage to several others, all of which were large and well-constructed. Large doors were blown in on these buildings as well. Several other smaller buildings received minor to major damage, and numerous heavy vehicles were damaged, with at least three being flipped over. Immediately north of the airfield, across farmland, several dozen trees were downed, two barns were heavily damaged, three power poles were blown down, and some shingles were blown off of a house. The tornado was rated EF3 on the Enhanced Fujita scale.

=== 2023 Helicopter Training Crash ===
Nine soldiers in the 101st Airborne Division were killed during a helicopter training exercise on March 29, 2023. Happening around 10 p.m. local time, two HH-60 Black Hawk medical evacuation aircraft crashed into each other, while pilots were using night vision goggles. Their helicopters crashed west of Fort Campbell in a partially wooded field.

== Operations and taxation ==
The Sabalauski Air Assault School, named after Command Sergeant Major Walter James Sabalauski is located on Fort Campbell. Courses taught include Air Assault, Pathfinder, Pre-Ranger, Jumpmaster Refresher, and Rappel Master. Fast Rope Insertion Extraction System (FRIES)/Special Purpose Insertion Extraction (SPIES) Master courses are also taught. The school is also home to the Division's Parachute Demonstration Team.

Kentucky has limited rights to taxation: Individuals performing services on the Kentucky portion of Fort Campbell only pay taxes to the state where they are residents, refer to US Code Title 4, Chapter 4, §115. Tennessee has no state income tax on wages but a higher retail sales tax than Kentucky.

== Fort Campbell Parachute Demonstration Team "Screaming Eagles" ==
The Fort Campbell parachute demonstration team was established in 1958 during the infancy of precision freefall as the Army's first such team—pre-dating the Golden Knights, United States Army Parachute Team, by one year. Early team members were soldiers who volunteered their free time in order to perform quality parachute demonstrations. In 1984, the 101st command group opted to form a full-time parachute team, known as the "Screaming Eagles".

The "Screaming Eagles" perform more than 60 parachute demonstrations each year in front of an average viewing audience of 5,000 spectators. The team has a diverse background of Army Military Occupational Specialties (MOS) and at this time has seven members. The team has one Light Wheeled Mechanic, two Combat Medics, three Infantrymen, and one Parachute Rigger most of whom have combat experience. Collectively, the 2009 team has more than 40 years of skydiving experience and more than 6,000 skydives.

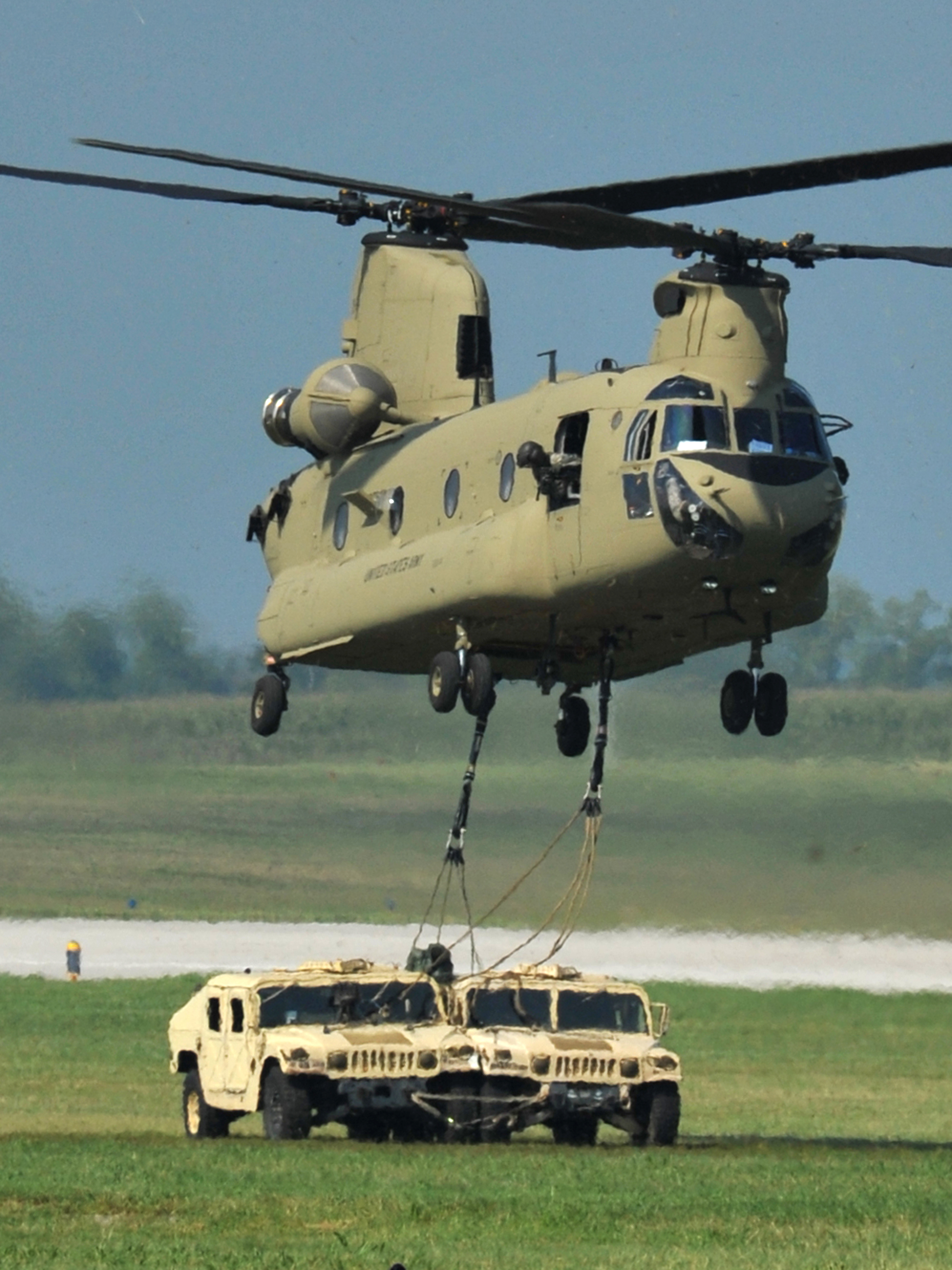
Boeing CH-47 Chinook, with the 159th Combat Aviation Brigade, 101st Airborne Division, delivers two Humvees during air assault training at Campbell Army Airfield on Fort Campbell.

== Tenant units ==
- 101st Airborne Division
- 160th Special Operations Aviation Regiment
- 5th Special Forces Group
- 52nd Ordnance Group (EOD)
- 302nd Intelligence and Electronic Warfare (IEW) Battalion
- 531st Hospital Center
- 502nd Military Police Battalion (CID)

Campbell Army Airfield (USAF units)

- 19th Air Support Operations Squadron (19th ASOS)
- 18th Weather Squadron, Detachment 4

Other facilities include Blanchfield Army Community Hospital, Sabalauski Air Assault School and the SSG John W. Kreckel NCO Academy.

== Education ==
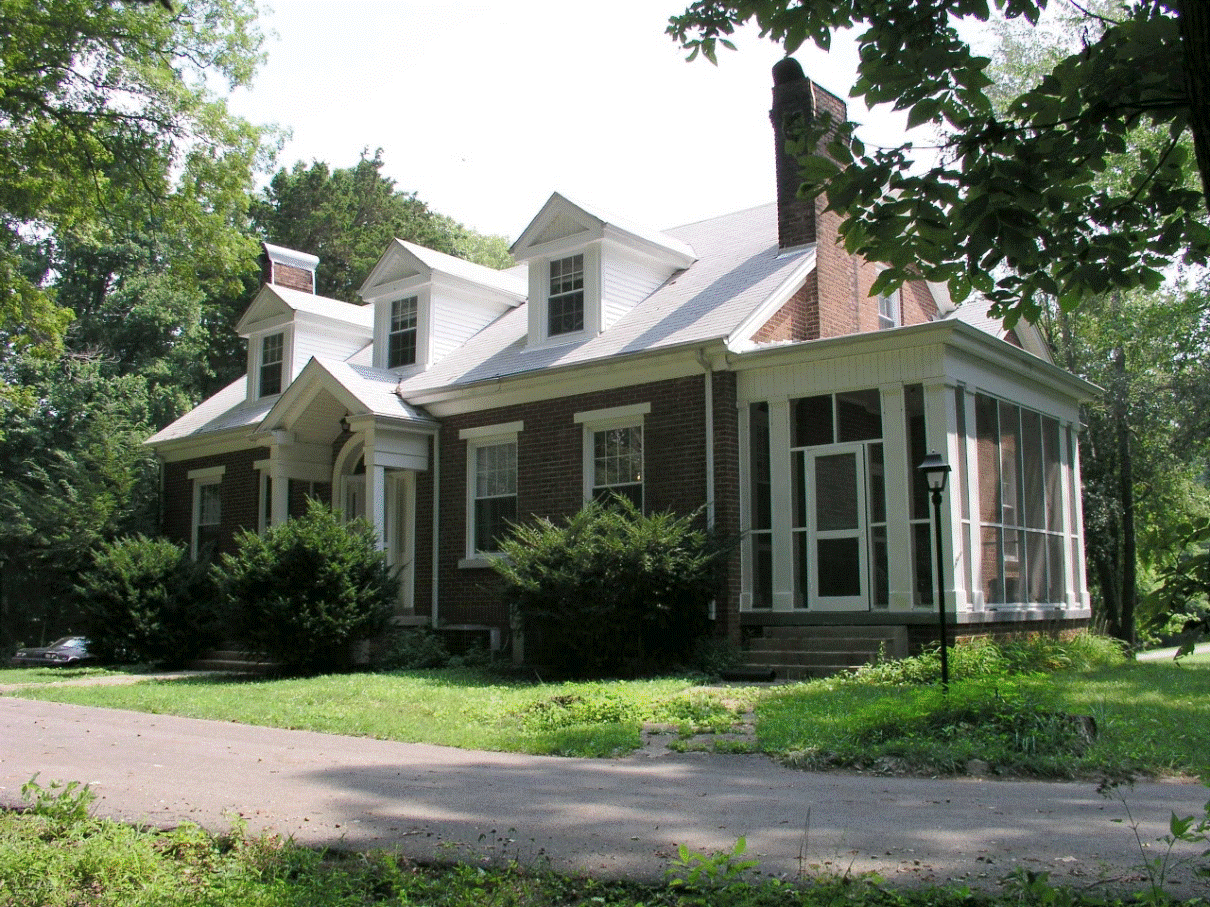
Childers House: base commander's official residence

Residents are zoned to Department of Defense Education Activity (DoDEA) schools.

Elementary schools are as follows:

- Barkley Elementary School (Barker Court, LaPointe Village, McAuliffe Park, New Hammond Heights, Summers Park, Stryker Village, Taylor
- Barsanti Elementary School (Drennan/New Drennan, Gardner Hills, and Woodlands)Village, Turner Loop, Zahn Park, and part of Hammond Heights)
- Andre Lucas Elementary School (Cole Park, Harper Village, Lee Park, and Werner Park)
- Marshall Elementary School (Pierce Village and a portion of Hammond Heights)

Hammond Heights is divided among several elementary schools: Barkley and Marshall schools as well as Collins, Gorgas, and Hollis elementary schools.

All residents of Fort Campbell are zoned to Mahaffey Middle School, and Fort Campbell High School.

In 2015 Jackson Elementary School and Lincoln Elementary School closed. Barkley Elementary was to have a new building. Wassom Middle School closed in 2017. Mahaffey Middle School and Wassom Middle School formerly served separate areas. Mahaffey Middle's boundary included Cole Park, Drennan Park, Gardner Hills, Harper Village, New Drennan, Stryker Village, Turner Loop, Werner Park, and Woodlands. Wassom's boundary included Barker Court, Hammond Heights, LaPointe, Lee Park, McAuliffe Park, New Hammond Heights, Pierce Village, Summer Park, Taylor Village, and Zahn Park.

The high school first opened in 1962. The current high school building was dedicated in 2018. Of the students, the percentage who attend for all four years total at FCHS is 10.

There were plans for a new middle school, but in 2019 the funds were instead designated for a wall along the Mexico-United States border.

== See also ==
- 502nd Infantry Regiment (United States)
- Fort Campbell North, Kentucky (for information on the census-designated place)
- Sergeant Hasan Akbar
- Campbell Army Airfield
- Sabre Army Heliport
- 101st Airborne Division
- 101st Combat Aviation Brigade
- 3rd Battalion, 158th Aviation Regiment
