= General Order No. 99 =

1914 US Navy order banning alcohol

General Order No. 99 was a directive issued by the United States Navy on June 1, 1914, prohibiting the consumption of alcoholic beverages aboard naval vessels and within Navy facilities. The order was a precursor to the nationwide Prohibition movement and represented an early attempt by the military to address concerns over discipline and operational readiness.

== Background ==
During the late 19th and early 20th centuries, alcohol consumption was a significant concern in the U.S. military, as excessive drinking was perceived to impact discipline and efficiency. Advocacy by temperance movements, including groups like the Woman's Christian Temperance Union and the Anti-Saloon League, gained traction during this time, influencing public and institutional policies.

General Order No. 99 predates the ratification of the 18th Amendment to the U.S. Constitution, which instituted national Prohibition in 1920. While the 18th Amendment made the production, sale, and transport of alcohol illegal across the United States, the Navy's alcohol ban was narrower in scope, targeting consumption within its jurisdiction.

The Navy, facing challenges related to sailor conduct and operational preparedness, implemented General Order No. 99 under the leadership of Secretary of the Navy Josephus Daniels. The order explicitly forbade the introduction or use of intoxicating liquors on board naval vessels or within naval establishments.

== Legacy and cultural impact ==
General Order No. 99 had a lasting impact on Navy culture. With alcohol banned, sailors sought alternative means to boost morale. One notable example was the increased popularity of ice cream as a substitute for alcohol aboard naval ships. This cultural shift was particularly evident during World War II, when ice cream became a staple for improving sailor morale.

Despite its initial effectiveness, General Order No. 99 faced criticism over the years. Opponents argued that the policy was paternalistic and disconnected from broader societal changes, particularly after the repeal of Prohibition in 1933.

== Overturn and current policies ==
The total ban on alcohol remained in place for decades, but modern Navy policies have relaxed the restrictions established under General Order No. 99. Today, alcohol is permitted in certain controlled settings, such as officers' clubs or during specific recreational events, provided consumption adheres to regulations designed to ensure safety and professionalism.

== See also ==
- United States Navy Regulations
- Beer day
