= Roof stomp =

US Air Force tradition for welcoming new high-ranking officer

A roof stomp is a tradition in the United States Air Force in which servicemen within the unit mount the roof of the home of a new unit commander, colonel, or other higher-ranking officer and stomp on the roof. The event originated as a "no-notice hospitality check" in flying units, where pilots proceeded to a commander's residence to check their ability to entertain the group with beverages, food, and entertainment. Frequently, the location or target is determined based on not being present when the majority of a squadron determines a squadron party needs to happen.

Members proceed directly to their squadron mate's house and stomp on the roof in an attempt to be let in. Originally these events were intended as surprises, but more frequently now, the member's significant other is notified to prepare and make necessary arrangements for the gathering. It is an "informal celebration recognizing a new commander, a retirement or other special event." A variation of the roof stomp tradition is the "porch stomp".

According to Greg Tims:

Traditionally, a roof stomp is where you greet a new commander or celebrate some sort of special occasion by climbing up on the commander's roof and begin to make a LOT of noise while others are outside banging on the windows and doors. When he or she opens the door, the commander invites the group in for food and drink.

== See also ==
- Blood wings
- Line-crossing ceremony
- Steel beach picnic
