= Beer day =

United States naval tradition

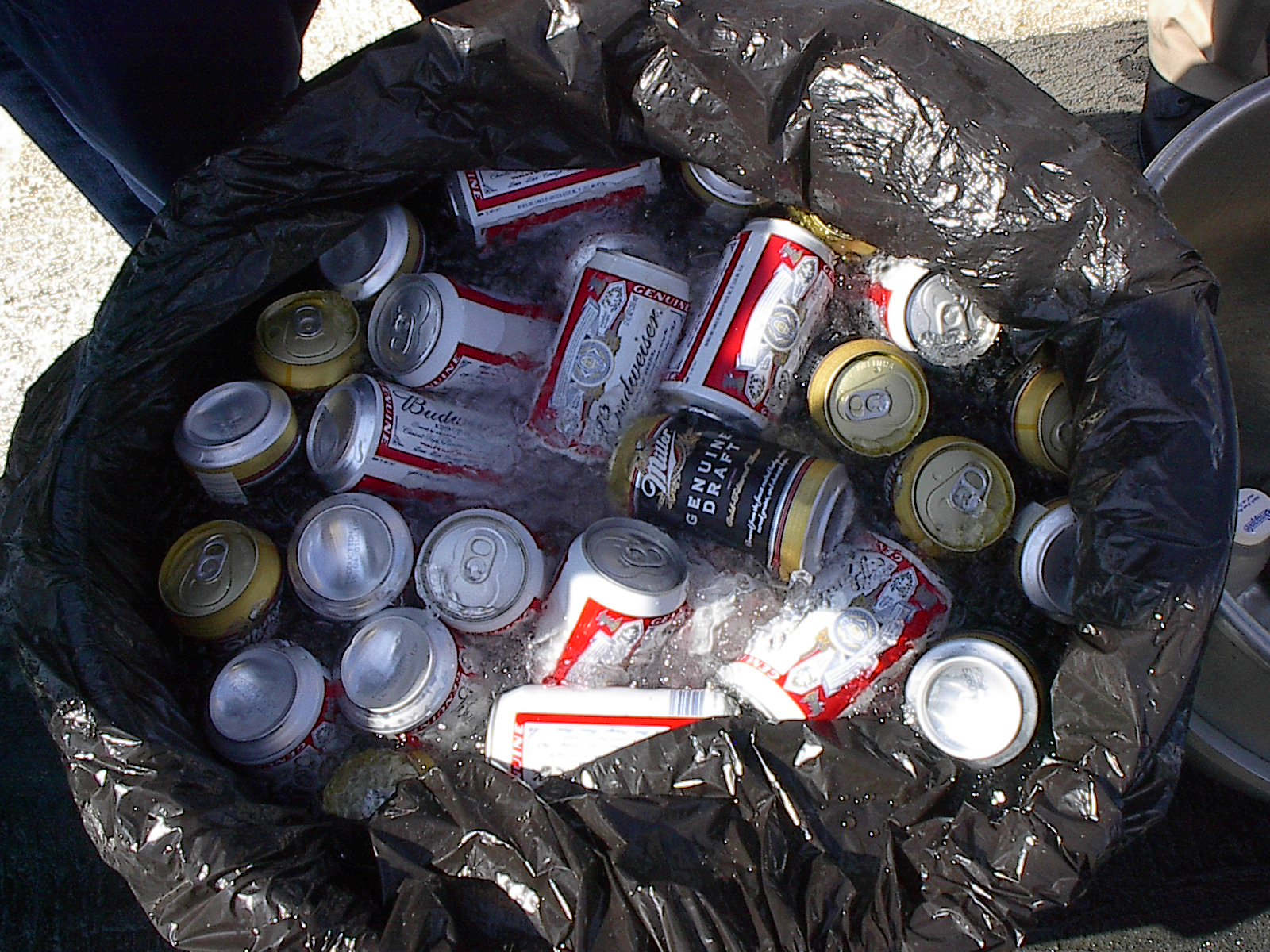
The authorized beer. Two beers per crew member filled two large trash cans.

Beer Day is the term applied to an event where a United States Navy or Military Sealift Command vessel's personnel are issued, and authorized to consume, beer.

== Historical context ==
Beginning in 1794 the U.S. Congress authorized a daily alcohol ration for sailors. Over time the regulations of alcohol consumption aboard Navy vessels changed in various forms until finally on June 1, 1914 Josephus Daniels issued General Order 99, which ended all alcohol consumption.

== Authorization ==
When a vessel has been at sea for 45 continuous days and has more than 5 days left before coming into port, then a ship captain may request permission from the Numbered Fleet Commander to conduct a beer day. This authorization is not automatic and is subject to operational commitments, local threat assessments and the commander's approval. This event is authorized once every 45 days at sea, so once a beer day is held, the ship's crew has to wait another 45 continuous days without a port call until another beer day could be authorized.

== Intent ==
The purpose of a beer day is to boost ship morale by providing the crew with an opportunity to relax and are usually coordinated with cook-outs, authorized wear of civilian clothes and other operational stand-downs commonly referred to as steel beach picnics.

== See also ==
- Rum ration
- Steel beach picnic
