= Cargo hook (helicopter) =

Aircraft aft device

A cargo hook is a device suspended below a helicopter and allows the transport of external loads during flight. Common terms for this operation include slingwork, underslung loads, external loadwork, and external load operations.

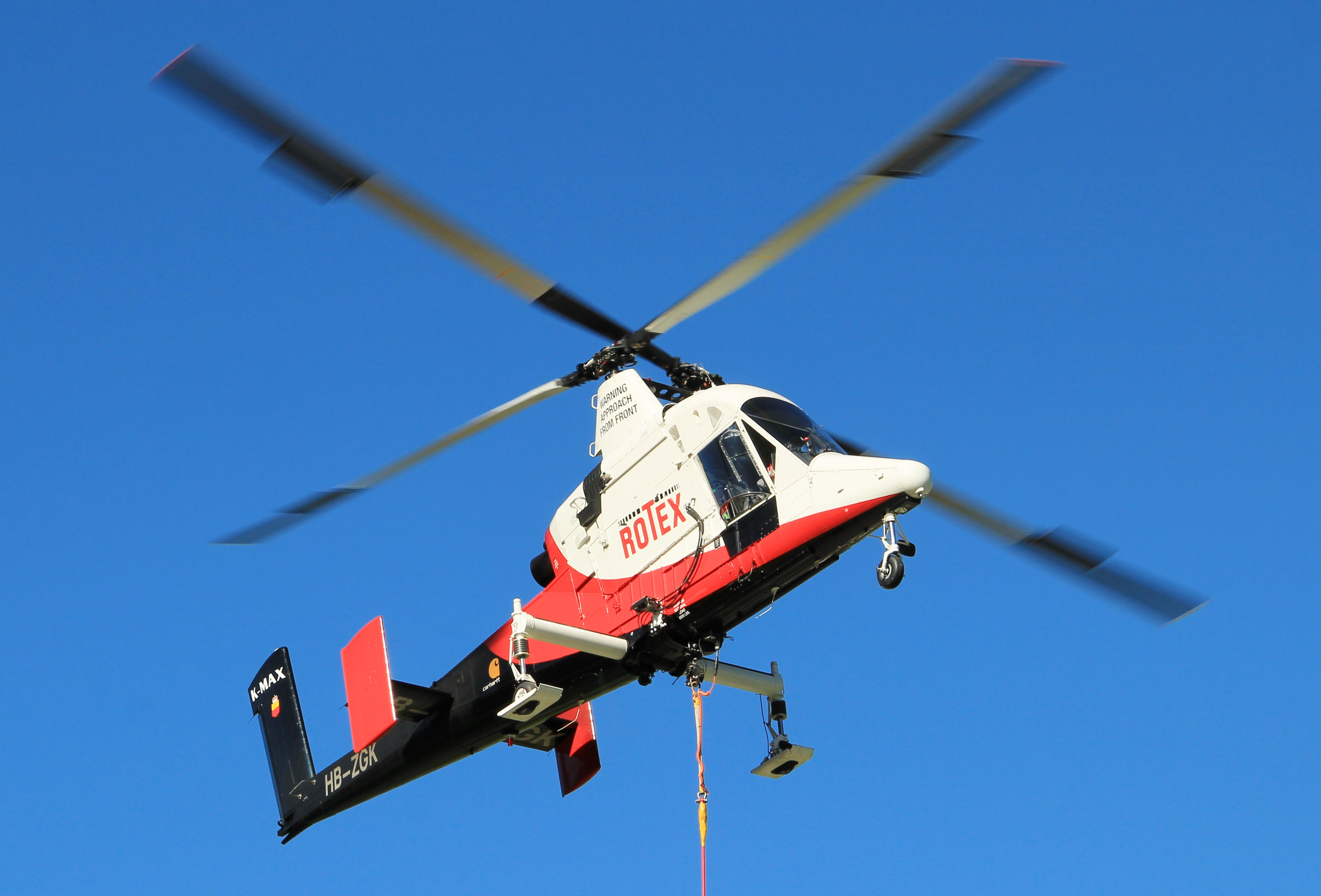
K-1200 K-MAX

== Hook types ==
=== Primary hooks ===
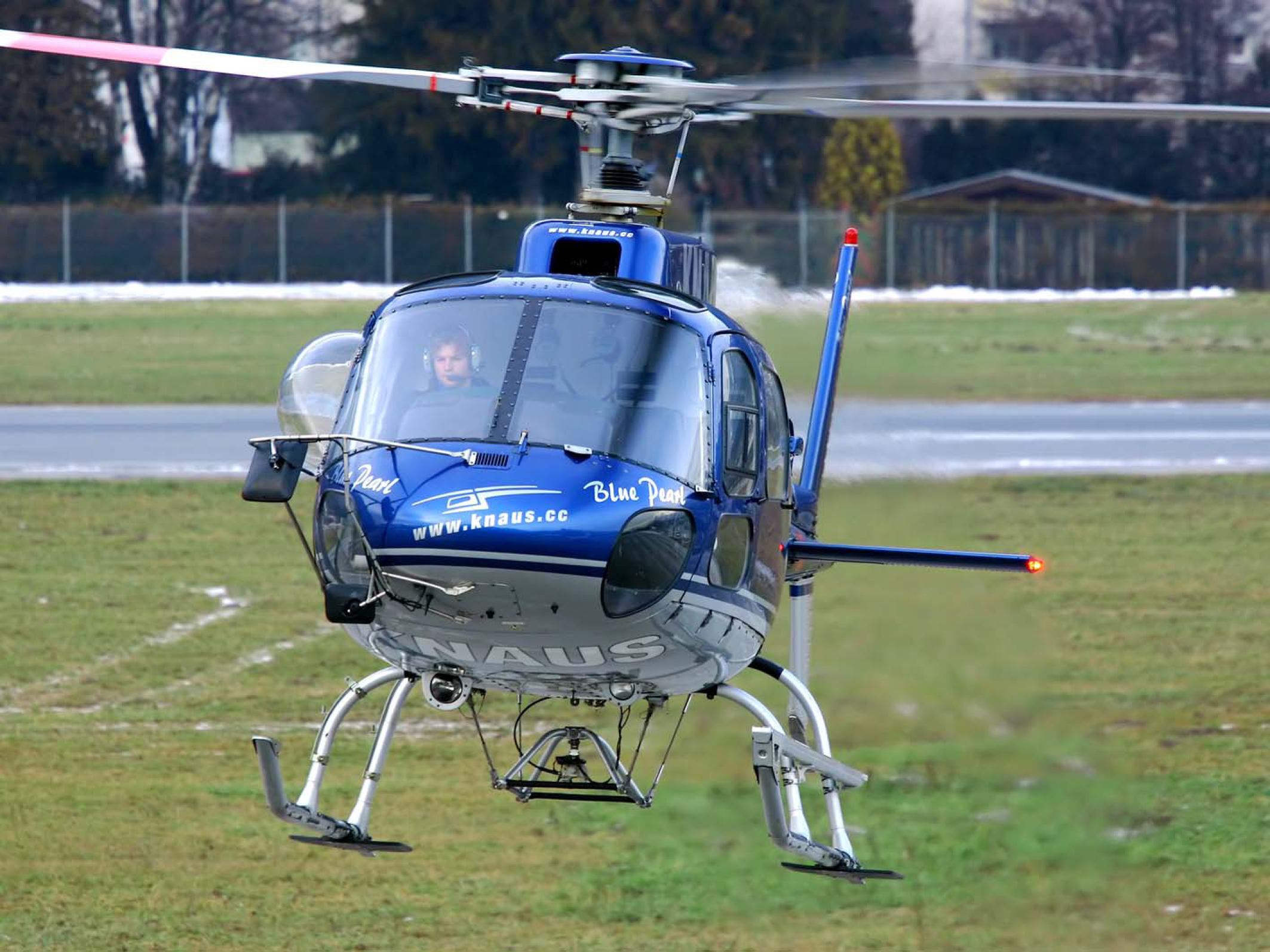
A Eurocopter AS350 helicopter with a belly hook installed. This configuration is called a swing or suspension system mount because the actual cargo hook drops down from inside a swing frame that is suspended from the fuselage by four cables.

Primary, or "belly", hooks are designed to mount directly to the airframe belly, i.e. underside, of a helicopter. Because they are attached to the fuselage, or "skin," of the aircraft, belly hooks are regulated by the various worldwide aviation regulatory agencies. In the United States, belly hooks are governed under Federal Aviation Administration (FAA) FAR Part 133. Belly hooks are designed, manufactured, and approved for use on specific aircraft models. Belly hooks that have been certified by the FAA receive a Supplemental Type Certificate (STC) that describes the aircraft models that are authorized to use the hook for external load operations. For example, a belly hook approved for use by the FAA on a Eurocopter AS350 could not be used on a Bell 407 helicopter unless covered by the STC.

For small to mid-size utility helicopters performing external load work, belly hooks are typically mounted to the fuselage using either a sling or a suspension configuration. The sling mount uses a single attachment point, whereas a suspension system uses four attachment points. Since suspension systems transfer the weight of the cargo load across a larger swath of the aircraft, they can carry heavier loads than sling mounts.

=== Remote hooks ===
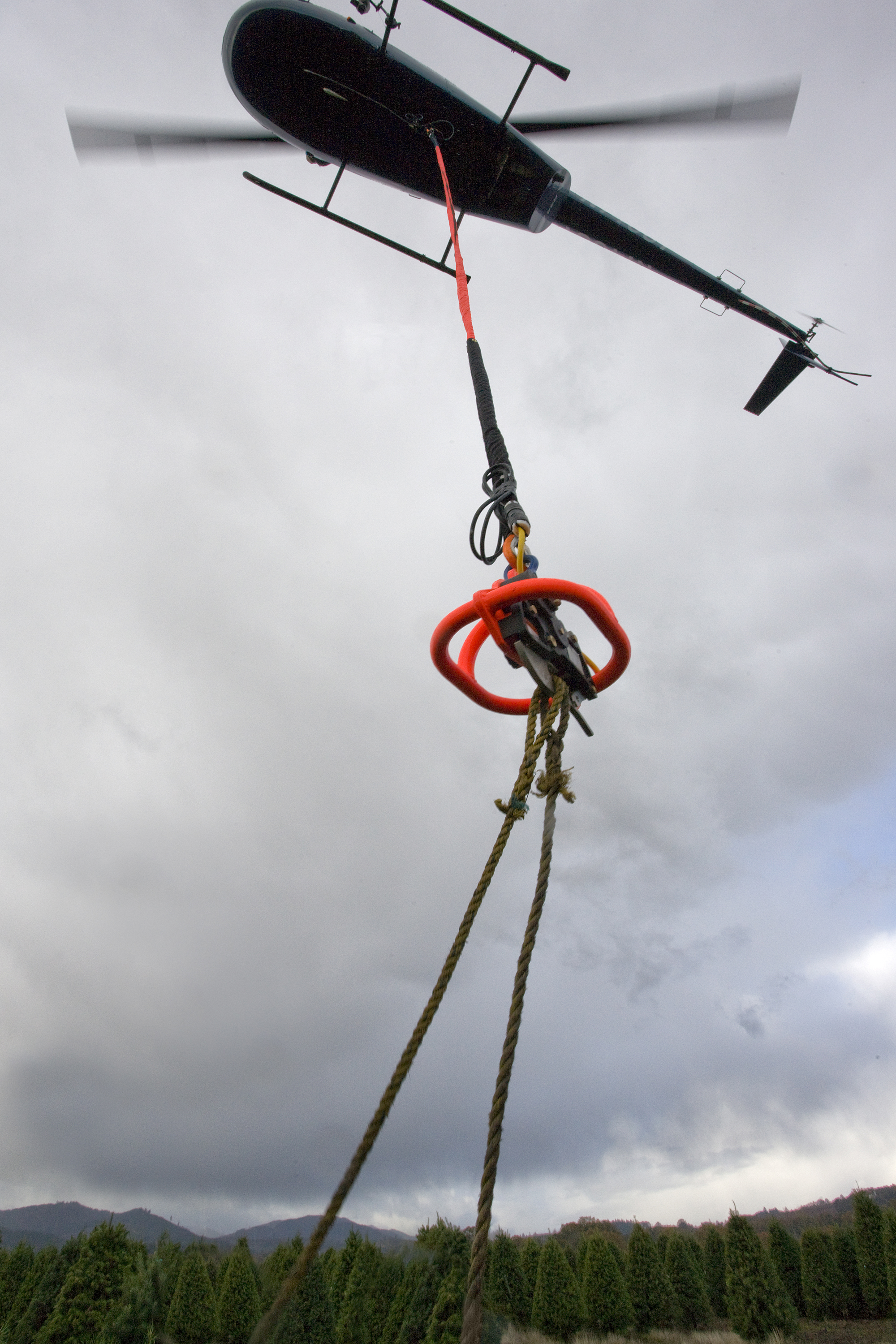
A Robinson R44 Raven II helicopter using a remote hook to lift Christmas trees. The remote hook is suspended from the belly hook with a long line.

Remote hooks are suspended beneath the belly hook by a long line, swivel, or other device. Because they are not attached directly to the airframe, they do not require aircraft-specific certification and can be used on a wide variety of helicopter models.

== Technical details ==
=== Parts of a cargo hook ===
Key components of a cargo hook include the load beam, the keeper, and the attach point. The load beam is the solid piece of metal at the bottom of a cargo hook that supports the load. Usually it has a curved, narrow end which is used to load a ring, rope, or net onto the hook. The keeper is the locking, spring-operated mechanism that keeps the load from sliding off the load beam during transport. The attach point attaches the hook to the belly of the helicopter, swing system, or longline.

=== Helicopters and load capacities ===
The following table includes a list of helicopter models that are designed to carry underslung loads. Cargo capacities provided reflect the airframe manufacturer's specifications; when put into practice the actual maximum load capacities may be less, depending on the rating of the cargo hook equipment. For example, if a helicopter model is rated by the manufacturer as having a maximum cargo sling load capacity of 4,000 lb, but the cargo hook equipment is only rated for 3,000 lb, then the pilot can only carry loads weighing 3,000 lb or less.

Manufacturer	Model	Slingload Cargo Capacity (lb)
Sud Aviation	Alouette II - SE 3130, SA 313	2,500
Sud Aviation	Alouette III - SA 316-319	1,650
Aerospatiale/Eurocopter	AS 350/355	mounted directly to airframe 2,557 on swing suspension 3,086
Aerospatiale/Westland	SA 330 Puma	7,055
Agusta	A109	1,500
Bell	204/UH-1	4,000
Bell	205/UH-1H	4,000
Bell	206 Jet Ranger/OH-58	1,500
Bell	206 Long Ranger	2,000
Bell	212	4,000
Bell	412	4,000
Bell-Boeing	V-22 Osprey	15,000
Boeing/Vertol	CH-47	28,000
Bristol	Bristol Belvedere	5,250
Eurocopter	EC145	
Hindustan Aeronautics Ltd	DHRUVS ALH	3,300
Kaman Aircraft	K-MAX	6,855
Kamov	KA-32	
MD Helicopters	369D/E, 500N	2,000
MIL	MI-6	17,650
Leonardo	AW139	
MIL	Mi-8/MI-17 HIP C-K	8,818
MIL	MI-10/MI-10K Harke	36,600
MIL	Mil Mi-26	44,092
MIL	Mil Mi-38	15,432
MIL	Mil Mi-171A2	11,023
Sikorsky	S-64E/F Sky Crane	20,000
Sikorsky	S-70/UH-60 Black Hawk/SH-60 Seahawk	9,000
Sikorsky	S-76	8,000
Kamov	Ka-226	2,425
Kamov	Ka-32A11BC	11,023
Kamov	Ka-62	5,511

== Common usage ==
Utility helicopter operators perform a wide variety of external load work that varies region to region and season to season. Some of the most common external load operations include:

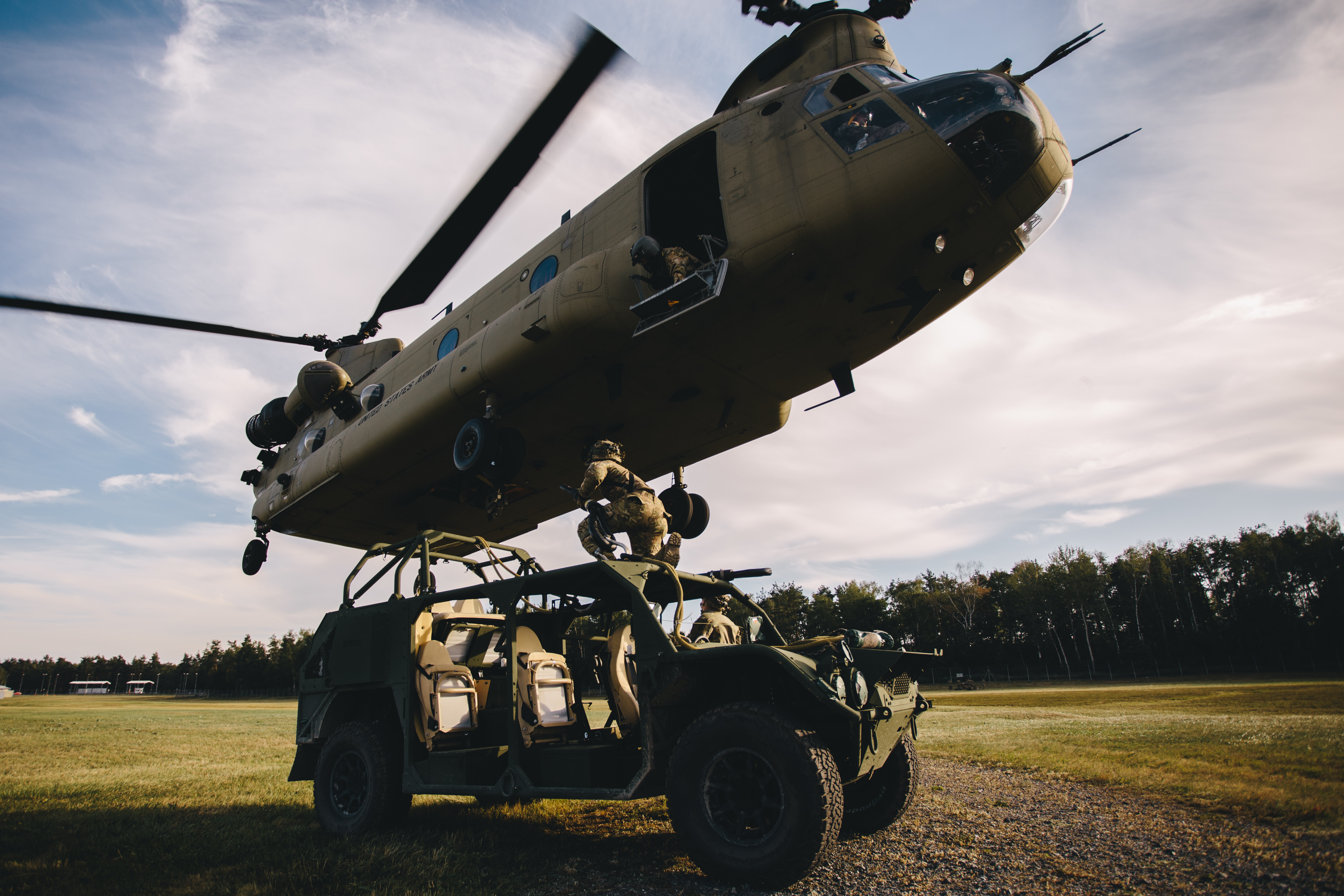
U.S. Army paratroopers from the 173rd Airborne Brigade sling load a M1297 Army Ground Mobility Vehicle to a CH-47 Chinook (2019)

- Fire suppression with buckets;
- Construction work
- Fertilizer spreading
- Heli-logging
- Christmas tree harvesting
- Electrical line work
- Servicing oil rigs and stocking remote outposts with supplies
- Agriculture (fence building, distributing hay bales, salt blocks, etc.)
- Marijuana Extraction
- Aerial Side-Trimming around power transmission lines and pipelines
- Aerial movement of military vehicles and equipment

== Safety ==
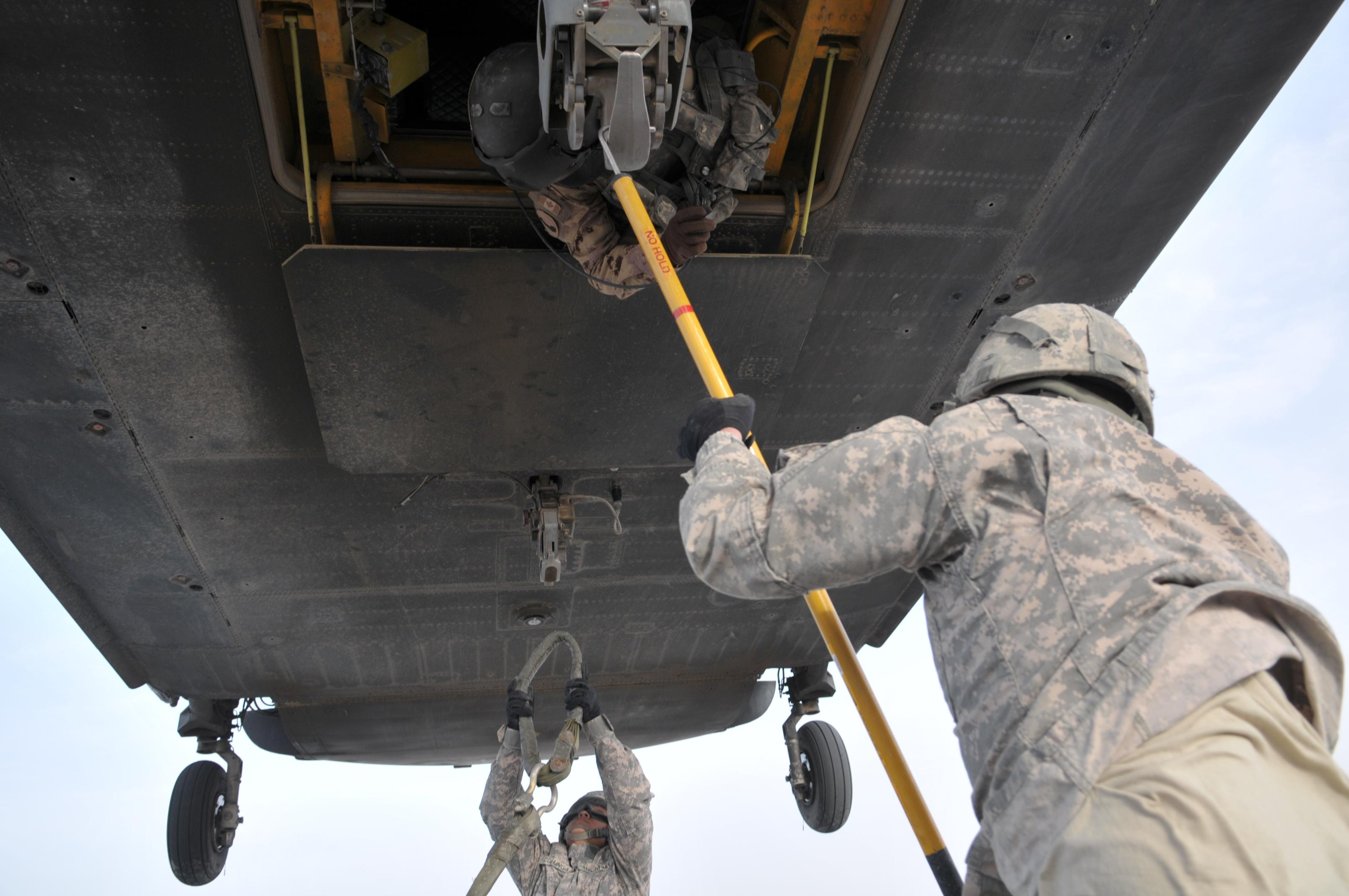
A soldier (foreground) uses a static discharge wand to make an aircraft safe to touch for the rest of the hook-up team to connect a cargo bag to a Royal Canadian Air Force CH-47 Chinook helicopter in Afghanistan. The helicopter crew chief can be seen in the floor hatch providing assistance.

Improperly rigged cargo loads can threaten the aircraft as well as people on the ground. External loads must be prepared and inspected by trained personnel, and all rigging equipment must be rated for the weight of the load and in servicable condition.

The task of hooking sling loads up to a helicopter also presents certain dangers. In flight, a helicopter generates and stores a charge of static electricity. When the helicopter lands, this charge passes to the ground through the helicopter grounding system. However, in flight, this charge remains stored in the helicopter until a path is provided to ground. Personnel connecting a sling load must discharge this static electricity prior to any hook up. Rotorwash can also pose a hazard, causing difficulty to nearby personnel walking or standing, as well as blowing unsecured items around. Wear of safety glasses is necessary.

3 days of the US Army Air Assault course is dedicated to training and testing servicemembers on the inspection of sling loads and procedures for hook-up operations. This testing is the most difficult portion of the 10 day course.

== See also ==
- Military transport aircraft
- List of civil aviation authorities
- Aerial crane
