= Walter James Sabalauski =

United States Army command sergeant major and boxer

- Born: Vladislovas Sabaliauskas; March 31, 1910; Tytuvėnai, Kovno Governorate, Russian Empire
- Died: August 9, 1993 (aged 83)
- Burial place: Arlington National Cemetery
- Military career
- Allegiance: United States
- Branch: United States Army
- Service years: 1941–1972
- Rank: Command Sergeant Major
- Conflicts: World War II; Korean War; Vietnam War
- Awards: Distinguished Service Cross; Silver Star; Legion of Merit; Bronze Star (8); Air Medal (3); Army Commendation Medal (6); Purple Heart (4); Combat Infantryman Badge (3); Master Parachutist Badge; Campaign medal(s)

Walter James Sabalauski (Lithuanian: Vladislovas Sabaliauskas; March 31, 1910 – August 9, 1993) was a United States Army command sergeant major and boxer.

== Early life ==
He was born as Vladislovas Sabaliauskas in Tytuvėnai on March 31, 1910. Around 1911–1912, his father emigrated to the United States, while his mother joined him about one year later, and they returned to Lithuania in 1913. In 1921, she and her two sons, an 11-year-old Vladislovas and a 6-year-old Stanislovas emigrated to the United States and settled in Chicago. As a youth, Vladislovas began boxing and one of his idols was fellow Lithuanian Jack Sharkey. From 1929 to 1937, he was a professional boxer and won 31 of 33 bouts. His boxing career ended due to injuries sustained in a road accident.

== Military service ==
Sabalauski entered the Army in June 1941. During World War II, he served in the Pacific theater, fighting on the beachheads of the Solomon Islands, Guadalcanal, and the Philippines. He later served in the Korean War with the 187th Regimental Combat Team (Airborne) and 25th Infantry Regiment. In 1963, Sabalauski went to Vietnam for the first time, where he served as an advisor to the 32nd Vietnamese Ranger Battalion. After service in the Dominican Republic in 1965, he returned to Vietnam in 1966. It was during this tour that he fought his most memorable battle.

Early in June 1966, Charlie Company, 2nd Battalion, 502nd Infantry Regiment, was conducting a mission to locate elements of the 24th North Vietnamese Regiment. Charlie Company made contact with what was estimated to be a battalion-sized enemy force. Under heavy enemy fire and unable to maneuver, company commander Captain William Carpenter called for air strikes on his position in an attempt to force the enemy to withdraw. The enemy ceased fire long enough to allow Charlie Company to consolidate, reorganize and establish a position from which to defend and begin evacuation of wounded personnel. First Sergeant Sabalauski repeatedly placed himself at risk for the sake of his soldiers during this mission. For his extraordinary heroism in destroying the enemy and in evacuating the casualties, he received both the Distinguished Service Cross and the Silver Star.

After his second tour in Vietnam, he returned to the United States to serve as Command Sergeant Major of the United States Corps of Cadets at West Point. In 1968, he again returned to Vietnam and the 2nd Battalion 502nd Infantry Regiment. His final assignment was as Command Sergeant Major of the 2nd Battalion, 508th Infantry Regiment of the 82nd Airborne Division at Fort Bragg from November 1970 until his retirement from the Army on April 1, 1972.

Command Sergeant Major Sabalauski's awards include the Distinguished Service Cross, Silver Star, Legion of Merit, 8 Bronze Stars, 3 Air Medals, 6 Army Commendation Medals, 4 Purple Hearts, 3 Awards of the Combat Infantryman Badge, the Master Parachutist Badge along with campaign medals for service in World War II, Korea, Dominican Republic, and Vietnam.

Command Sergeant Major Sabalauski died in 1993 and was buried with full military honors in Arlington National Cemetery.

The Sabalauski Air Assault School located in Fort Campbell, Kentucky was renamed in his honor in 1994.

== Awards and decorations ==

Combat Infantryman Badge (3rd Award)
Distinguished Service Cross	Silver Star	Legion of Merit
Bronze Star w/ Valor device and 1 silver and 2 bronze oak leaf clusters	Purple Heart w/ 3 bronze oak leaf clusters	Air Medal w/ Award numeral 3
Army Commendation Medal w/ Valor device and silver oak leaf cluster	Army Good Conduct Medal w/ 4 silver Good conduct loops	American Defense Service Medal
American Campaign Medal	Asiatic-Pacific Campaign Medal w/ Arrowhead device, 2 silver and 2 bronze campaign stars	World War II Victory Medal
National Defense Service Medal w/ 1 bronze service star	Korean Service Medal w/ 3 bronze campaign stars	Armed Forces Expeditionary Medal w/ 1 bronze service star
Vietnam Service Medal w/ 1 silver and 2 bronze campaign stars	Korean Defense Service Medal	Philippine Liberation Medal w/ 2 bronze service stars
United Nations Korea Medal	Vietnam Campaign Medal	Republic of Korea War Service Medal

Army Presidential Unit Citation w/ 2 bronze oak leaf clusters	Army Meritorious Unit Commendation	Philippine Republic Presidential Unit Citation
Republic of Korea Presidential Unit Citation	Republic of Vietnam Gallantry Cross Unit Citation	Republic of Vietnam Civil Actions Unit Citation

Senior Parachutist Badge

- 10 Service Stripes, indicating 30–32 years of service.
