= Line-crossing ceremony =

Initiation rite for first crossing of the equator

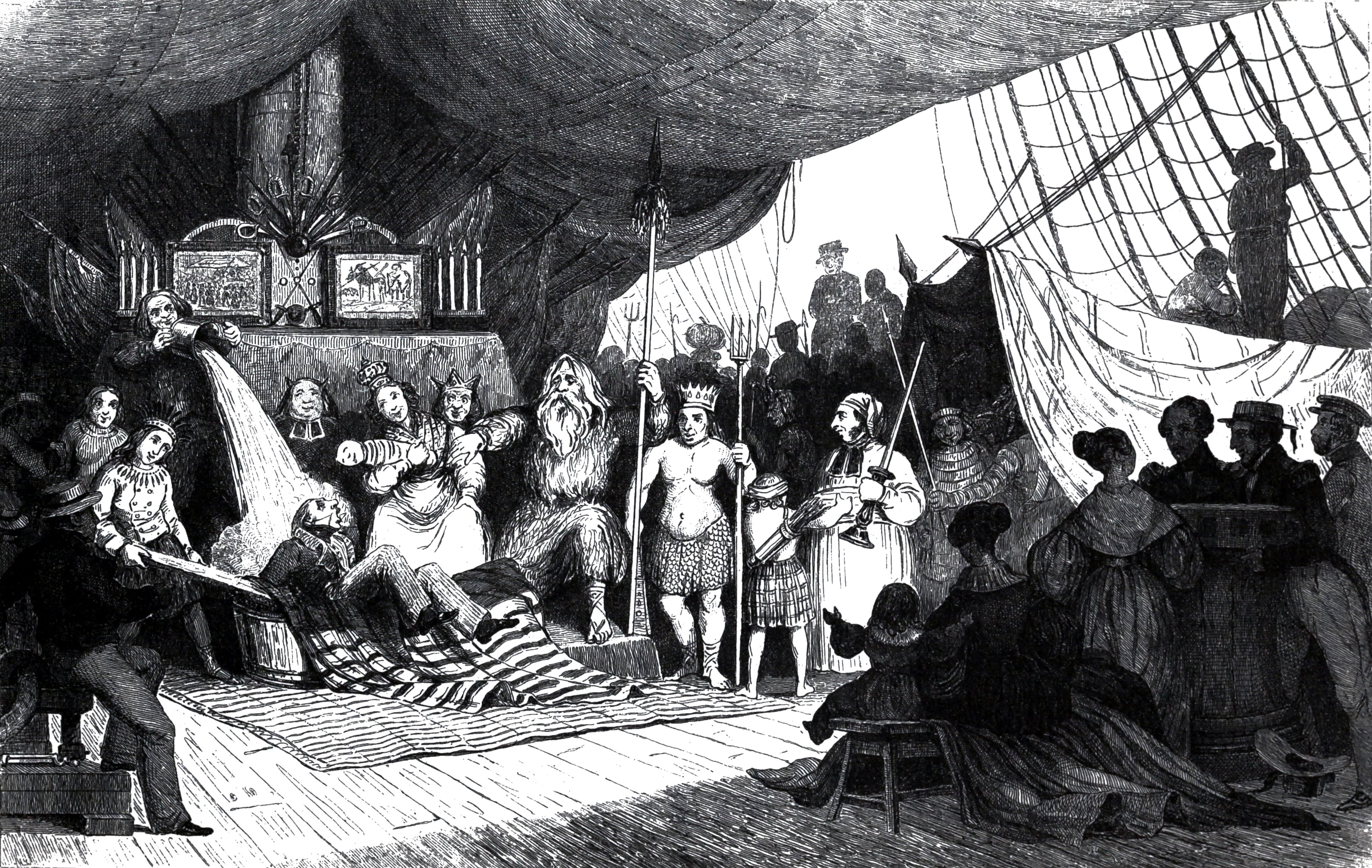
The line-crossing ceremony aboard the French frigate Méduse on 1 July 1816

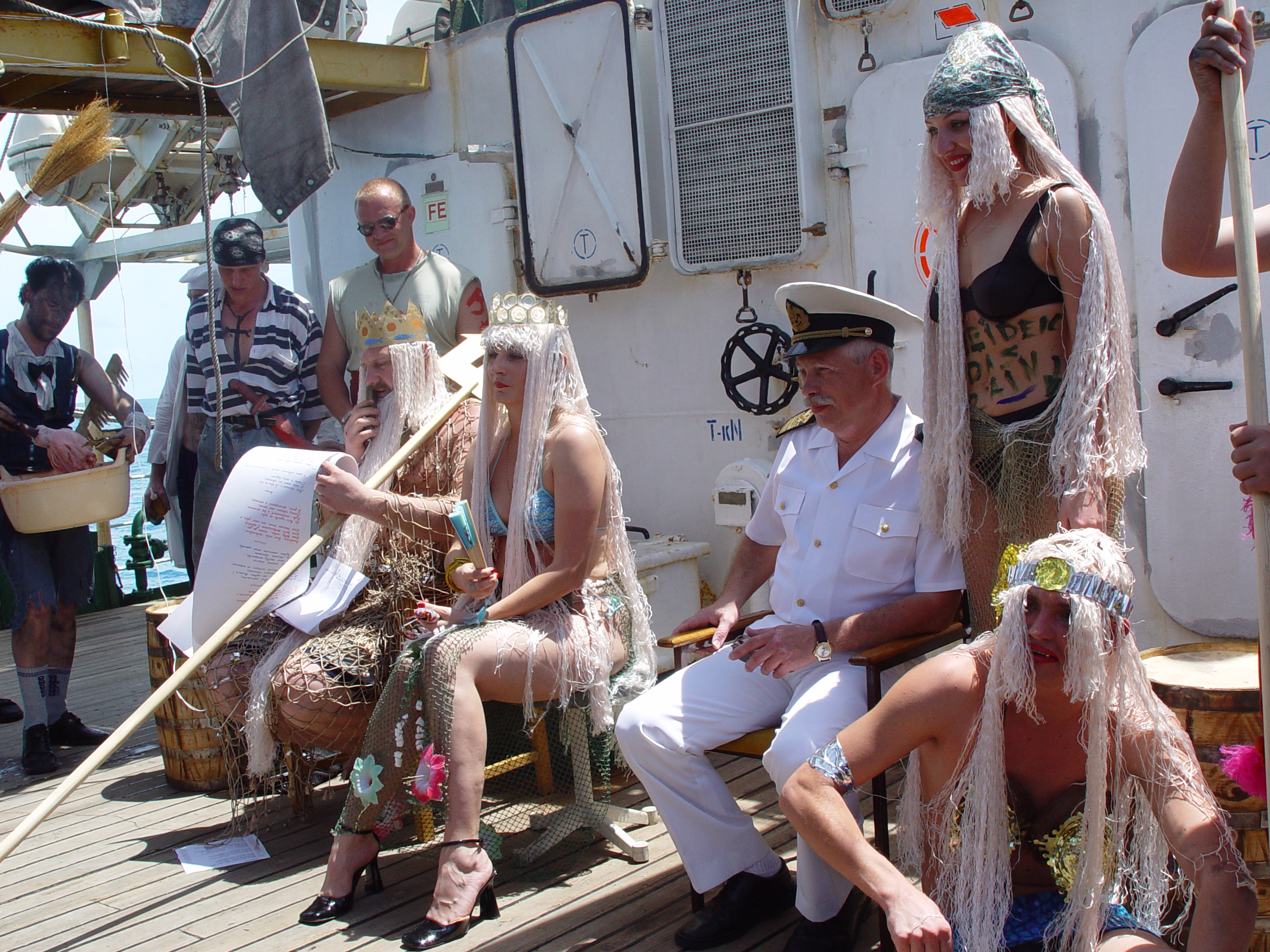
Neptune and his entourage during a Polish line-crossing ceremony (Chrzest równikowy)

The line-crossing ceremony, also known as Crossing the Line, is an initiation rite in some English-speaking countries that commemorates a person's first crossing of the equator. The tradition may have originated with ceremonies when passing headlands, and became a "folly" sanctioned as a boost to morale, or have been created as a test for seasoned sailors to ensure their new shipmates were capable of handling long, rough voyages. Equator-crossing ceremonies, typically featuring King Neptune, are common in the navy and are also sometimes carried out for passengers' entertainment on civilian ocean liners and cruise ships. They are also performed in the merchant navy and aboard sail training ships. Throughout history, line-crossing ceremonies have sometimes become dangerous hazing rituals. Most modern navies have instituted regulations that prohibit physical attacks on sailors undergoing the line-crossing ceremony.

== Traditions ==
=== Australia ===
In 1995, a notorious line-crossing ceremony took place on the Royal Australian Navy submarine HMAS Onslow. Sailors undergoing the ceremony were physically and verbally abused before being subjected to an act called "sump on the rump", where a dark liquid was daubed over each sailor's anus and genitalia. One sailor was then sexually assaulted with a long stick before all sailors undergoing the ceremony were forced to jump overboard and tread water until permitted to climb back aboard the submarine. A videotape of the ceremony was obtained by the Nine Network and aired on Australian television. The coverage provoked widespread criticism, especially when the videotape showed some of the submarine's officers watching the entire proceedings from the conning tower.

=== Canada ===
In the Royal Canadian Navy, those who have not yet crossed the equator are nicknamed "tadpoles" or "dirty tadpoles"; an earlier nickname was "griffins".

=== France ===
The French author François-Timoléon de Choisy crossed the equator in April 1685 (aboard the Oiseau bound for Siam), and had the following to say about their tradition:

"...we had the ceremony this morning. All the sailors who had already crossed it were armed with tongs, pincers, cooking pots and cauldrons... This company, after having done their drill, lined up beside a bucket or tub full of water, in which according to the ancient rite everyone who had not yet crossed the Line had to be dipped. His Excellency the Ambassador appeared before the court first, and promised, with his hand on a map of the world, to observe the ceremony, if ever he recrossed the Line, and in order not to be doused he put in the basin a fistful of silver. I did the same, as did all the officers, and those who had the wherewithal to buy their way out. The rest were plunged into the tub, and drenched in twenty buckets of water. Nearly sixty crowns were collected, which will be spent on buying refreshments for the crew".

=== United Kingdom ===
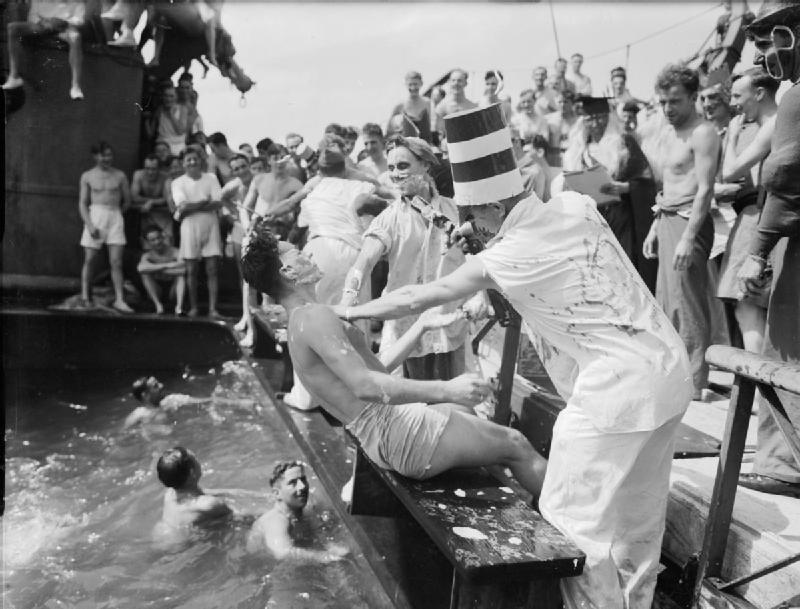
Line-crossing ceremony on Empress of Australia, August 1941

By the eighteenth century, there were well-established line-crossing rituals in the British Royal Navy. On the voyage of HMS Endeavour to the Pacific in 1768, captained by James Cook, Joseph Banks described how the crew drew up a list of everyone on board, including cats and dogs, and interrogated them as to whether they had crossed the equator. If they had not, they must choose to give up their allowance of wine for four days, or undergo a ducking ceremony in which they were ducked three times into the ocean. According to Banks, some of those ducked were "grinning and exulting in their hardiness", but others "were almost suffocated".

Captain Robert FitzRoy of HMS Beagle suggested the practice had developed from earlier ceremonies in Spanish, Portuguese, and Italian vessels passing notable headlands. He thought it was beneficial to morale. FitzRoy quoted Otto von Kotzebue's 1830 description in his 1839 Narrative of the Surveying Voyages of His Majesty's Ships Adventure and Beagle between the Years 1826 and 1836.

A similar ceremony took place during the second survey voyage of HMS Beagle. As they approached the equator on the evening of 16 February 1832, a pseudo-Neptune hailed the ship. Those credulous enough to run forward to see Neptune "were received with the watery honours which it is customary to bestow". The officer on watch reported a boat ahead, and Captain FitzRoy ordered "hands up, shorten sail". Using a speaking trumpet he questioned Neptune, who would visit them the next morning. About 9 am the next day, the novices or "griffins" were assembled in the darkness and heat of the lower deck, then one at a time were blindfolded and led up on deck by "four of Neptunes constables", as "buckets of water were thundered all around". The first "griffin" was Charles Darwin, who noted in his diary how he "was then placed on a plank, which could be easily tilted up into a large bath of water.—They then lathered my face & mouth with pitch and paint, & scraped some of it off with a piece of roughened iron hoop.—a signal being given I was tilted head over heels into the water, where two men received me & ducked me.—at last, glad enough, I escaped.—most of the others were treated much worse, dirty mixtures being put in their mouths & rubbed on their faces.—The whole ship was a shower bath: & water was flying about in every direction: of course not one person, even the Captain, got clear of being wet through." The ship's artist, Augustus Earle, made a sketch of the scene.

=== United States ===
A World War II example illustrated by Pete Verrier.

The U.S. Navy, U.S. Coast Guard and United States Marines have well-established line-crossing rituals. Sailors who have already crossed the equator are nicknamed Shellbacks, Trusty Shellbacks, Honorable Shellbacks, or Sons of Neptune. Those who have not crossed are nicknamed Pollywogs, or Slimy Pollywogs, or sometimes simply Slimy Wogs.

==== History ====
In the 18th century and earlier, the line-crossing ceremony was quite a brutal event, often involving beating pollywogs with boards and wet ropes and sometimes throwing the victims over the side of the ship, dragging the pollywog through the surf from the stern. In more than one instance, sailors were reported to have been killed while participating in a line-crossing ceremony.

Baptism on the line, also called equatorial baptism, is an alternative initiation ritual sometimes performed as a ship crosses the equator, involving water baptism of passengers or crew who have never crossed the equator before. The ceremony is sometimes explained as being an initiation into the court of King Neptune.

The ritual is the subject of a painting by Matthew Benedict named The Mariner's Baptism and of a 1961 book by Henning Henningsen named Crossing the Equator: Sailor's Baptism and Other Initiation Rites.

U.S. President Franklin D. Roosevelt described his crossing-the-line ceremony aboard the "Happy Ship" USS Indianapolis with his "Jolly Companions" in a letter to his wife Eleanor Roosevelt on 26 November 1936. Later, during World War II, the frequency of the ceremony increased dramatically, especially in the U.S. Navy in the Pacific, where the service's fleet operations grew enormously to counter widely dispersed Japanese forces. As late as World War II, the line-crossing ceremony was still rather rough and involved activities such as the "Devil's Tongue", which was an electrified piece of metal poked into the sides of those deemed pollywogs. Beatings were often still common, usually with wet firehoses, and several World War II Navy deck logs speak of sailors visiting sick bay after crossing the line.

Efforts to curtail the line-crossing ceremony did not begin until the 1980s, when several reports of blatant hazing began to circulate regarding the line-crossing ceremony, and at least one death was attributed to abuse while crossing the line.

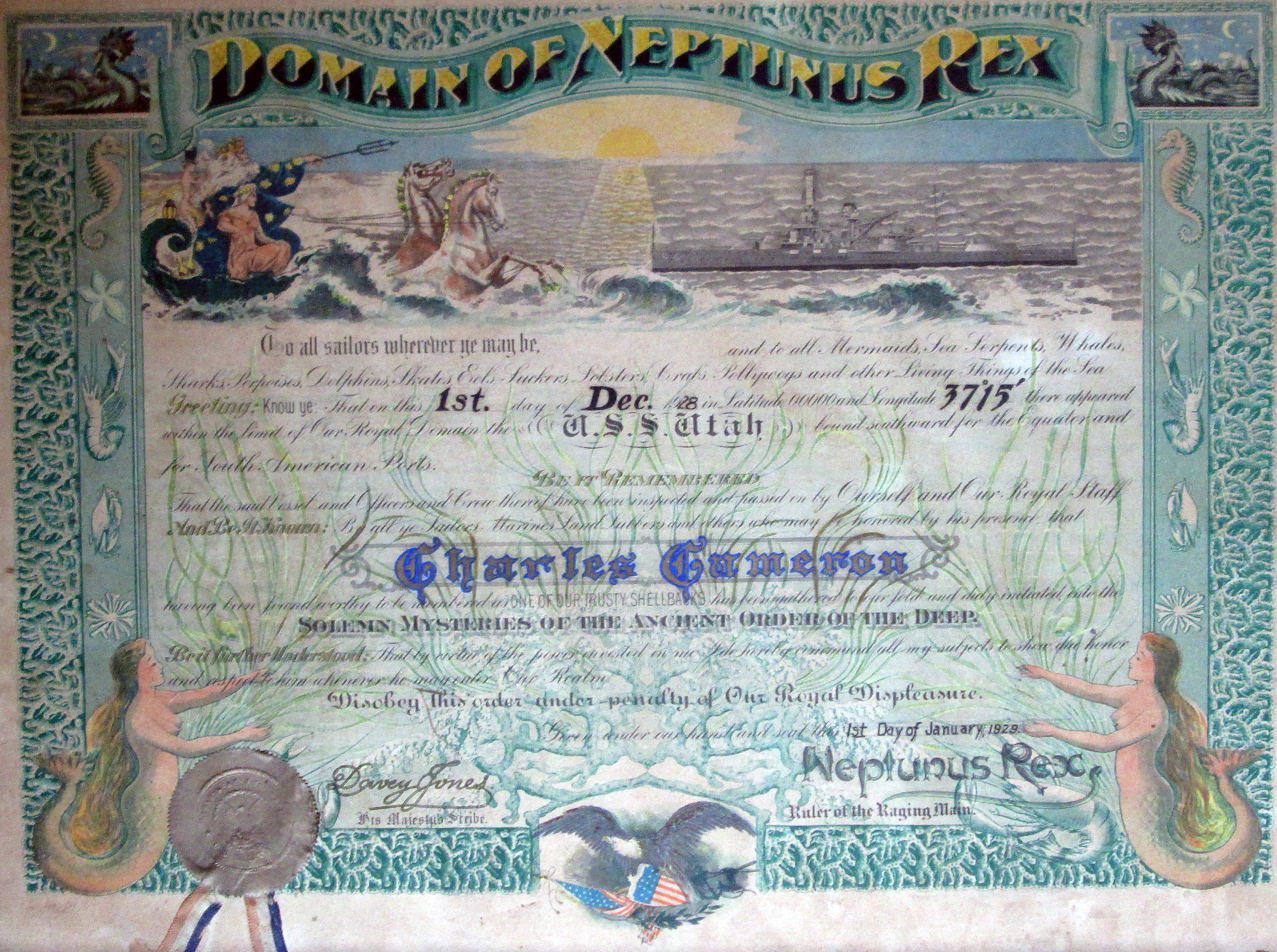
Shellback certificate awarded to Charles Cameron, aboard USS Utah, commemorating his first crossing of the equator, December 1, 1928. This is typical of certificates awarded in the pre-World War II period.

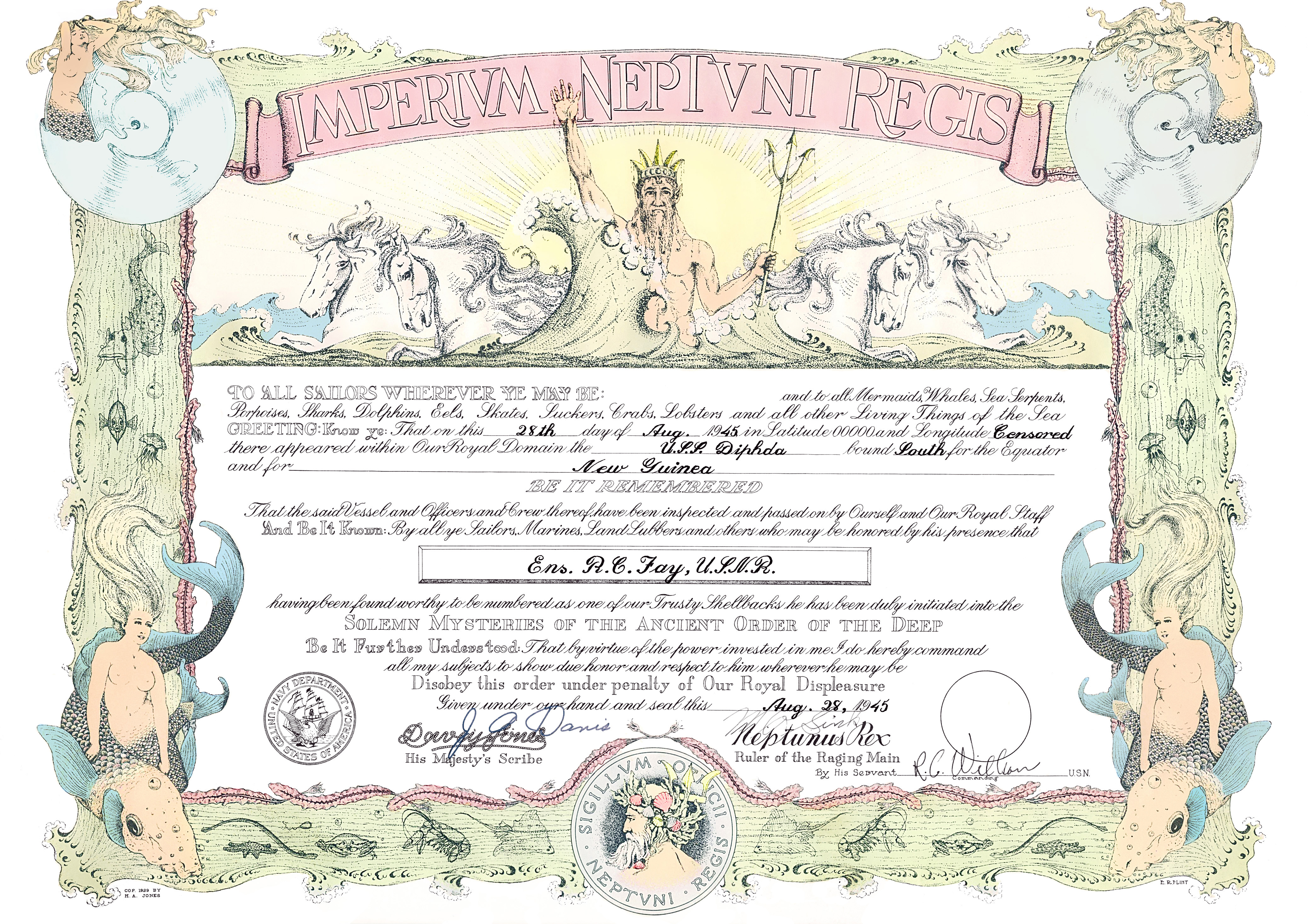
Shellback certificate for Bob Fay aboard USS Diphda for crossing the equator in the Pacific at the end of World War II, August 1945.

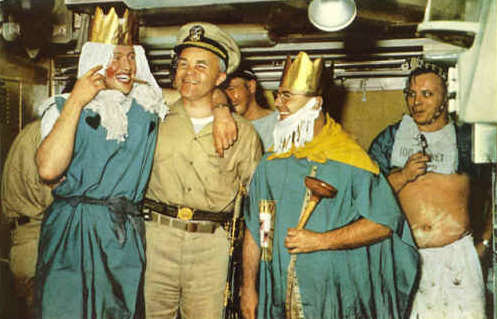
Crossing the equator ceremony (with "Davy Jones" with yellow cape and a plunger as sceptre) aboard USS Triton, 24 February 1960 as part of the Operation Sandblast cruise

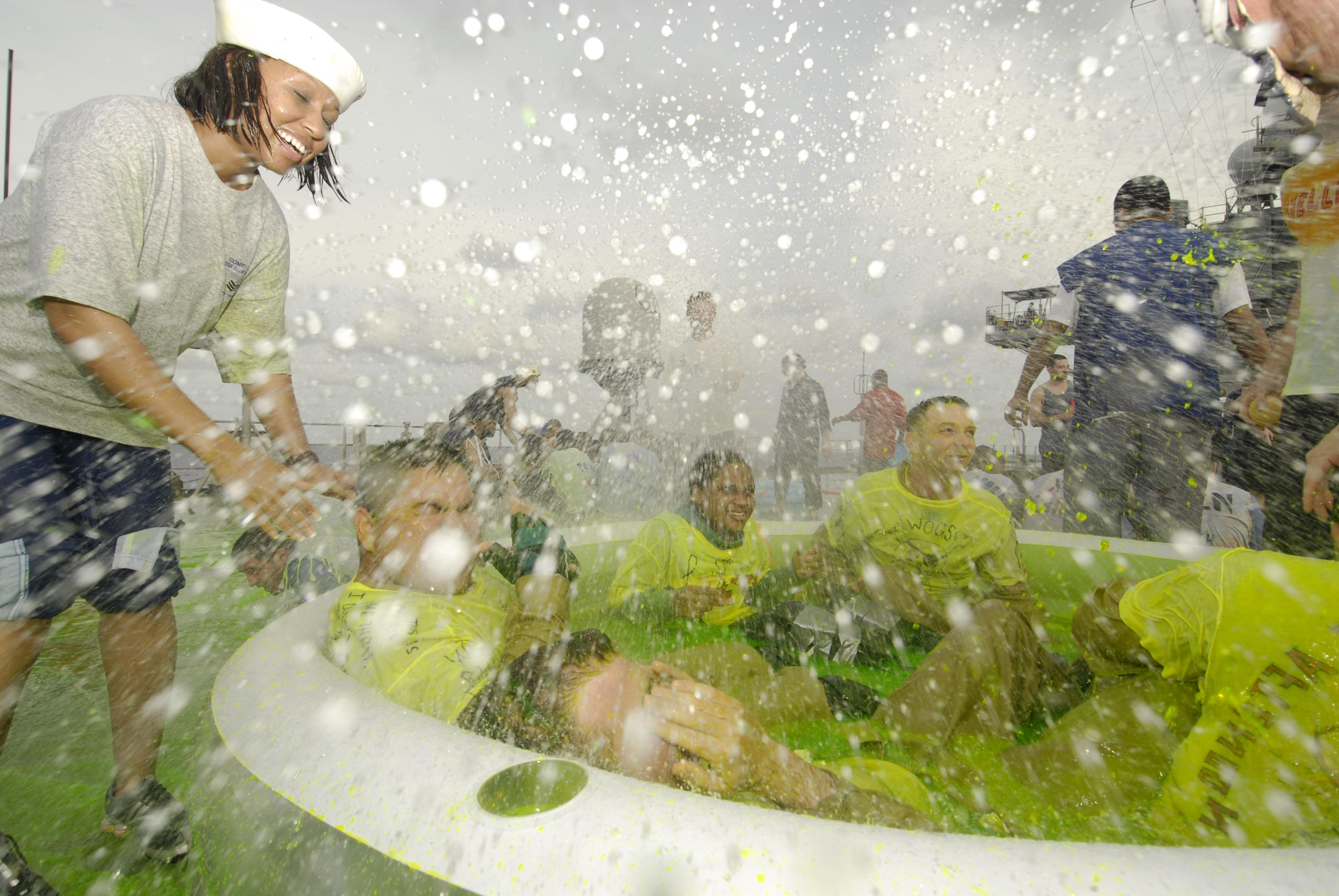
U.S. Sailors and Marines participate in a line-crossing ceremony aboard USS Blue Ridge as the ship passes the equator May 16, 2008. It has been a long naval tradition to initiate pollywogs (sailors who have never crossed the equator) into the kingdom of Neptune upon their first crossing of the equator.

==== Today ====
The two-day event (evening and day) is a ritual in which previously inducted crew members (Trusty Shellbacks) are organized into a "Court of Neptune" and induct the Slimy Pollywogs into "the mysteries of the Deep". Physical hardship, in keeping with the spirit of the initiation, is tolerated, and each Pollywog is expected to endure a standard initiation rite in order to become a Shellback. Depending on the Ocean or Fleet AOR, there can be variations in the rite. Some rites have discussed a role reversal as follows, but this is not always a normal feature, and may be dependent on whether a small number of Shellbacks exist to conduct the initiation.

The transition flows from established order to the "controlled chaos" of the Pollywog Revolt, the beginnings of re-order in the initiation rite as the fewer but experienced enlisted crew converts the Wogs through physical tests, then back to, and thereby affirming, the pre-established order of officers and enlisted.

The eve of the equatorial crossing is called Wog Day and, as with many other night-before rituals, is a mild type of reversal of the day to come. Wogs (all of the uninitiated) are allowed to capture and interrogate any Shellbacks they can find (e.g., tying them up, cracking eggs or pouring aftershave lotion on their heads). The Wogs are made very aware that it will be much harder on them if they do anything like this.

After crossing the line, Pollywogs receive subpoenas to appear before King Neptune and his court (usually including his first assistant Davy Jones and her Highness Amphitrite and often various dignitaries, who are all represented by the highest-ranking sailors who are Shellbacks), who officiate at the ceremony, which is often preceded by a beauty contest of men dressing up as women, each department of the ship being required to introduce one contestant in swimsuit drag. Afterwards, some may be "interrogated" by King Neptune and his entourage, and the use of "truth serum" (hot sauce + after shave) and whole uncooked eggs put in the mouth. During the ceremony, the Pollywogs undergo a number of increasingly embarrassing ordeals (wearing clothing inside out and backwards; crawling on hands and knees on nonskid-coated decks; being swatted with short lengths of firehose; being locked in stocks & pillories and pelted with mushy fruit; being locked in a water coffin of salt-water and bright green sea dye [fluorescent sodium salt]; crawling through chutes or large tubs of rotting garbage; kissing the Royal Baby's belly coated with axle grease, hair chopping, etc.), largely for the entertainment of the Shellbacks.

Once the ceremony is complete, a Pollywog receives a certificate declaring his new status. Another rare status is the Golden Shellback, a person who has crossed the equator at the 180th meridian. The rarest Shellback status is that of the Emerald Shellback (US), or Royal Diamond Shellback (Commonwealth), which is received after crossing the equator at the prime meridian, near the Null Island weather buoy. When a ship must cross the Equator reasonably close to one of these meridians, the ship's captain might plot a course across the Golden X so that the ship's crew can be initiated as Golden or Emerald/Royal Diamond Shellbacks.

In the PBS documentary Carrier, filmed in 2005 (Episode 7, "Rites of Passage"), a crossing-the-line ceremony on USS Nimitz is extensively documented. The ceremony is carefully orchestrated by the ship's officers, with some sailors reporting the events to be lackluster due to the removal of the rites of initiation.

Reflecting the popularity of tattoos among sailors, some people choose to get tattoos to mark that they have participated in a ceremony, such as an image of a shellback turtle or King Neptune.

==== Honors for line crossings and other navigational events ====
As Shellback initiation is conducted by each individual ship as a morale exercise and not officially recognized by the Navy with inclusion on discharge papers (DD Form 214) or through a formally organized institution, variations of the names as well as the protocol involved in induction vary from ship to ship and service to service.

Unique Shellback designations have been given to special circumstances which include:

- The Star Spangled Shellbacks title was given to the crew of USS Franklin D. Roosevelt for crossing the equator on July 4, 1966. The 2nd documented US vessel to accomplish this title was the USCGC Steadfast (WMEC-623), which earned it on July 4, 2023. The 3rd,4th, and 5th such US vessels were USS Frank Cable (AS-40), which also crossed the 180th Meridian making it the first Star Spangled Golden Shellback USNS Comfort (T-AH-20), and USCGC Harriet Lane (WMEC-903) all having crossed the equator on July 4, 2025. It is not known if this designation has ever been used on any other occasion, as no other mention of such honor has been located to date.
- The Iron Shellback for the crew who served on USS Dwight D. Eisenhower (CVN-69), USS Vella Gulf (CG-72), USS Paul Hamilton (DDG-60) and USS San Jacinto (CG-56), who crossed the equator during a 200+ consecutive day underway with no ports during their 2020 deployment.

Variations to the Shellback designation include:

- The Order of the Ebony Shellback for maritime personnel who have crossed the Equator on Lake Victoria.
- The Emerald Shellback or Royal Diamond Shellback for maritime personnel who cross the equator at the prime meridian.
- The Golden Shellback for maritime personnel who have crossed the point where the equator crosses the 180th meridian.
- The Top Secret Shellback for submariners who have crossed the equator at a classified degree of longitude.
- The Wooden Shellback for maritime personnel who have crossed the equator on a vessel with a wooden hull.
- The Pink Shellback for maritime personnel who have crossed the equator in the Amazon Rainforest on the Rio Branco.
- The Horned Shellback for maritime personnel who have crossed the equator and navigated past the Horn of Africa in the same voyage.
- The Mossback for maritime personnel who have crossed the equator and navigated past Cape Horn in the same voyage.

Consequently, similar "fraternities" commemorating other significant milestones in one's career include:

- The Order of the Blue Nose (Domain of the Polar Bear) for maritime personnel who have crossed the Arctic Circle.
- The Caterpillar Club for aviators who have made an unscheduled parachute jump from a disabled plane.
- The Century Club for aviators who have completed their 100th carrier landing.
- The Realm of the Czars for maritime personnel who crossed into the Black Sea.
- The Order of the Ditch for maritime personnel who have passed through the Panama Canal.
- Golden Dragon, including the Domain of the Golden Dragon, Realm of the Golden Dragon, Imperial Order of the Golden Dragon, or Sacred Order of the Golden Dragon, for maritime personnel who have crossed the 180th meridian.
- The Order of the Lakes for maritime personnel who have sailed on all five Great Lakes.
- The Order of Magellan for maritime personnel who circumnavigated the Earth.
- The Magellan's Strait Jacket Club for maritime personnel who transited the Straits of Magellan.
- The Order of the Flying Dutchman for maritime personnel who have sailed around the Cape of Good Hope.
- The Moss Back for maritime personnel who have sailed around the tip of South America (Cape Horn).
- The Order of the Golden Oscar for maritime personnel who have served with the Entertainment Liaison Office.
- Persian Excursion – The Society of the Arabian Nights for maritime personnel who have served in the Persian Gulf.
- Plank Owner for personnel stationed to a ship or shore command when that ship or unit was created, placed in commission, or in some cases removed from commission.
- The Order of Purple Porpoises for maritime personnel who crossed the junction of the equator and the International Date Line at the Sacred Hour of the Vernal Equinox.
- The Order of the Red Nose (Domain of the Penguin) for maritime personnel who have crossed the Antarctic Circle.
- The Order of the Rock for maritime personnel who have transited the Strait of Gibraltar.
- The Safari to Suez or The Order of Mariners of the Desert for maritime personnel who have transited the Suez Canal.
- The Order of the Sand Squid (or Sand Sailor) for maritime personnel who have been attached to land-based Army or Marine units stationed in the Middle East.
- The Order of the Spanish Main for maritime personnel who have sailed in the Caribbean.
- The Order of the Sparrow for maritime personnel who sailed on all seven seas.
- The Order of the Square Rigger for maritime personnel who have served aboard USCGC Eagle or USS Constitution.
- The Order of the Black Hull for United States Coast Guard personnel who have sailed aboard a buoy tender, which have hulls painted black.

==== California Maritime Academy ====
California Maritime Academy observed the line-crossing ceremony until 1989, after which the ceremony was deemed to be hazing and was forbidden. The 1989 crossing was fairly typical, as it was not realized to be the last one. Pollywogs participated voluntarily, though female midshipmen observed that they were under social pressure to do the ceremony but were targets of harder abuse. Pollywogs (midshipmen and anyone else who had not crossed) ascended a ladder from the forecastle to the superstructure deck of the ship. There, they crawled down a gauntlet of Shellbacks on both sides of a long, heavy canvas runner, about 10–12 meters. The shellbacks had prepared 3-foot lengths of canvas/rubber firehose, which they swung hard at the posterior of each Wog. The Wogs then ascended a ladder to the boat deck to slide down a makeshift chute into the baptism of messdeck leavings in sea water in an inflated liferaft back on the superstructure deck. Wogs then returned to the forecastle, where they were hosed off by firehose and then allowed to kiss, in turn, the belly of the sea-baby, the foot of the sea-hag, and the ring of King Neptune, each personified by Shellbacks.

==== Others ====
SUNY Maritime occasionally holds a Blue Nose ceremony for its cadets after crossing the Arctic Circle. Their most recent ceremony was during the summer of 2019, on the TSES VI, held shortly after departing Reykjavik. Cadets crawled through a tunnel with lo mein, or "Eel Spawn", and then had food put in their hair before crawling through the fantail while being sprayed by fire hoses.

Colorado State University's Semester at Sea Program holds a line-crossing ceremony twice a year for its students when their vessel, Blue Dream Star, crosses the equator.

== See also ==
- Domain of the Golden Dragon
- Blood wings
- Roof stomp

== Bibliography ==
- Bronner, Simon J. (2006). Crossing the Line: Violence, Play, and Drama in Naval Equator Traditions. Meertens Ethnology Cahier no. 2. Amsterdam: Amsterdam University Press.
