= United States Army Air Assault School =

United States Army Air Assault School (Sabalauski Air Assault School)
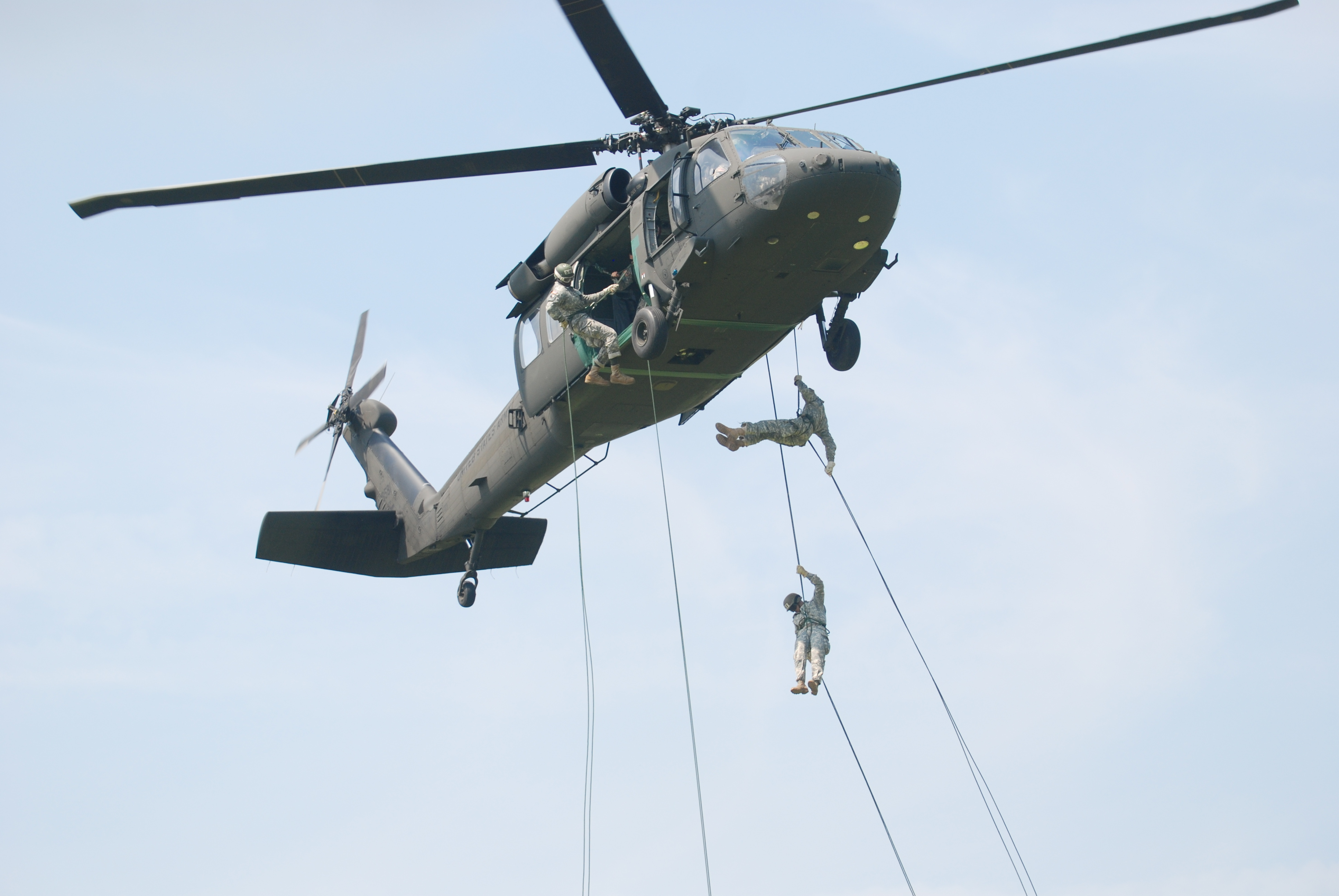
- US Army Air Assault School rappel training
- Country: United States
- Branch: United States Army
- Type: Military training
- Role: Special skills training
- Garrison/HQ: Fort Campbell, Kentucky
- Nickname: The Ten Toughest Days in the Army
- Patron: Walter James Sabalauski

Insignia
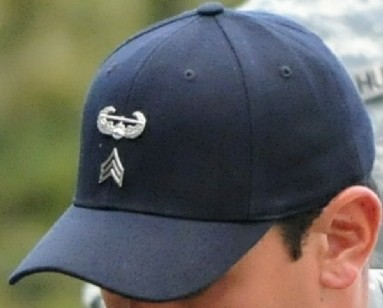
- Headgear worn by special skills instructors, known as "Black Hats"

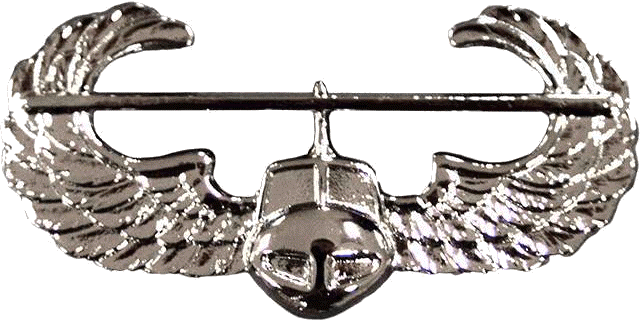
- Air Assault Badge awarded at graduation

The United States Army Air Assault School (officially, The Sabalauski Air Assault School, or TSAAS), is an Army Forces Command Table of Distribution and Allowances unit located at Fort Campbell, Kentucky. Its primary task is training leaders and soldiers assigned to the 101st Airborne Division (AASLT), other United States Army units, and United States Armed Forces service members. The school is named for Command Sergeant Major Walter James Sabalauski.

The school offers several courses, including Air Assault, Pathfinder, Pre-Ranger, Rappel Master, and Fast Rope Insertion Extraction System (FRIES)/Special Purpose Insertion Extraction (SPIES) Master courses. The school was also home to the Division's Parachute Demonstration Team. More than 8,000 soldiers are trained during more than 60 courses per year.

== Air Assault School ==
The best-known course offered at TSAAS is Air Assault School, which qualifies soldiers to conduct airmobile and air assault helicopter operations, including aircraft orientation; helicopter insertion; pathfinder operations; sling load operations; rappelling from buildings, cliffs and helicopters; and fast-rope techniques.

The Air Assault School course is offered several times per year, taught by instructors referred to as Air Assault Sergeants. Open to men and women, the intensive, fast-paced training is known as the 10 (or 11) toughest days in the Army. About 15 percent of the class does not make it through the first day, dubbed Zero day, which includes a demanding obstacle course. More fail to make it past sling load testing in phase two. Ultimately, only about 45 percent pass.

On the morning of graduation, students must complete a 19.3 km (12.0 mi) march with rucksack in under three hours before receiving their wings. Completion qualifies soldiers to wear the Air Assault Badge.

=== Training ===
Overview: Air Assault School at Ft Hood (3:13)

Each day begins with rigorous physical training that includes unit runs from 3.2 to 8 km (2.0 to 5.0 mi).

==== Day Zero ====
Soldiers are not considered "Air Assault Students" until they complete Day Zero, the first day of the course, which includes an obstacle course, two-mile (3.2 km) run, and extensive physical training.

==== Inspection ====
An inspection of each soldier's 16 kg (35 lb) ruck sack is conducted after the 9.7 km (6.0 mi) foot-march on Day One. Soldiers must have all items on the packing list each student is given, with each item clean and serviceable (in usable condition). A soldier who loses any item can be immediately dropped from the course. The inspection has a very specific lay-out that the soldier must adhere to. Every item must be placed exactly how the Air Assault instructors have displayed the items, and all items must be laid out "as worn."

==== Two-mile run and obstacle course ====
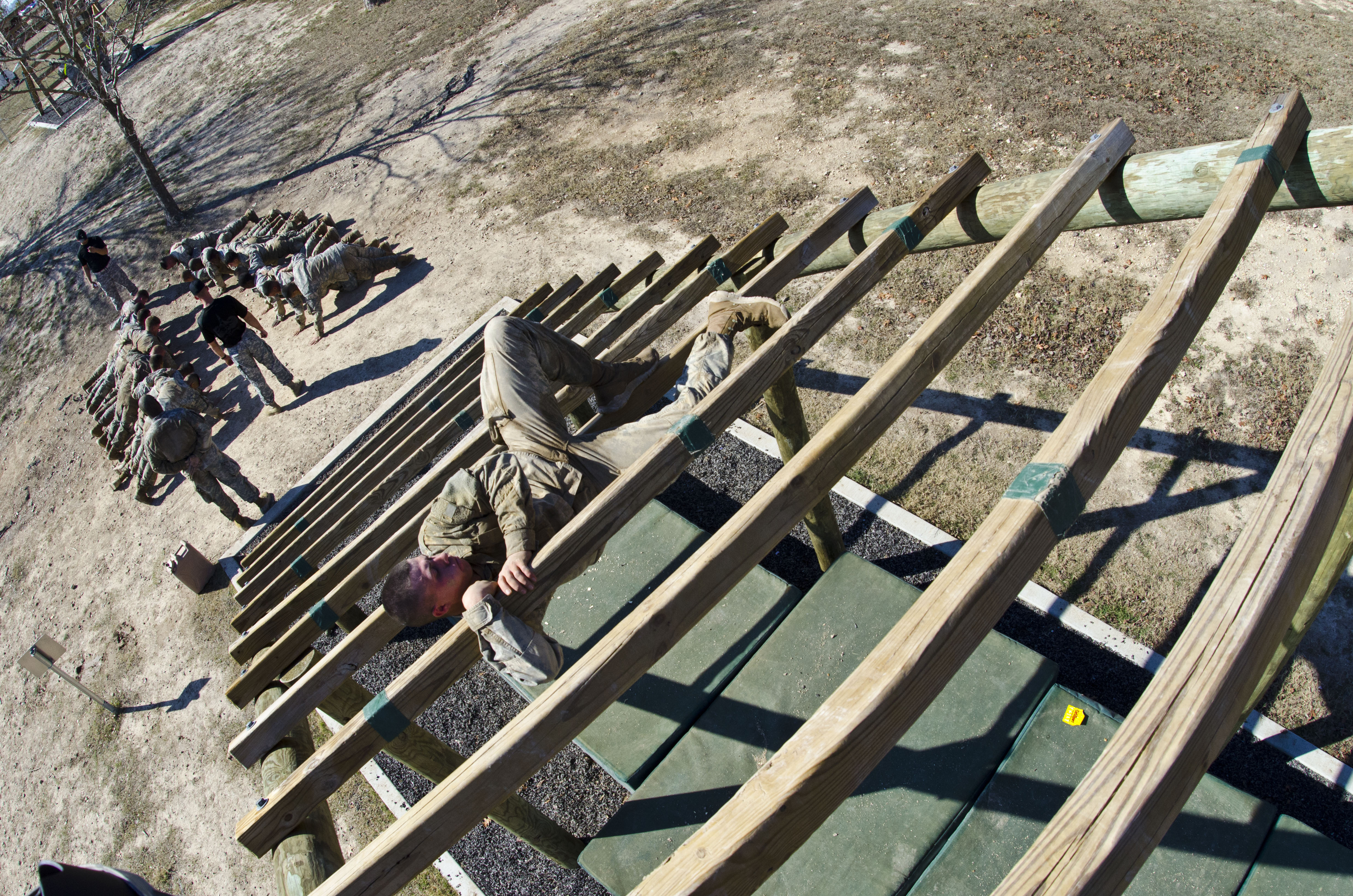
Student traverses obstacle course during Day Zero of Air Assault School

Students must complete a two-mile (3.2 km) run in under 18 minutes to receive a "GO" — i.e., satisfactory completion of the event. The uniform for the run is Army Combat Uniform (minus the ACU Top depending on the season in which the training cycle begins) with running shoes.

Next is an obstacle course designed to assess a student's upper body strength, agility, endurance, confidence, and ability to perform at heights without displaying fear or distress. There are nine obstacles: two mandatory obstacles (failing either will result in being dropped from the course) and seven minor obstacles (a soldier may fail one and still continue).

Instructors use the obstacle test to determine whether a student will be able to complete Air Assault School without endangering themselves, instructors, or other students during the demanding course.

==== Phase One (Combat Assault) ====
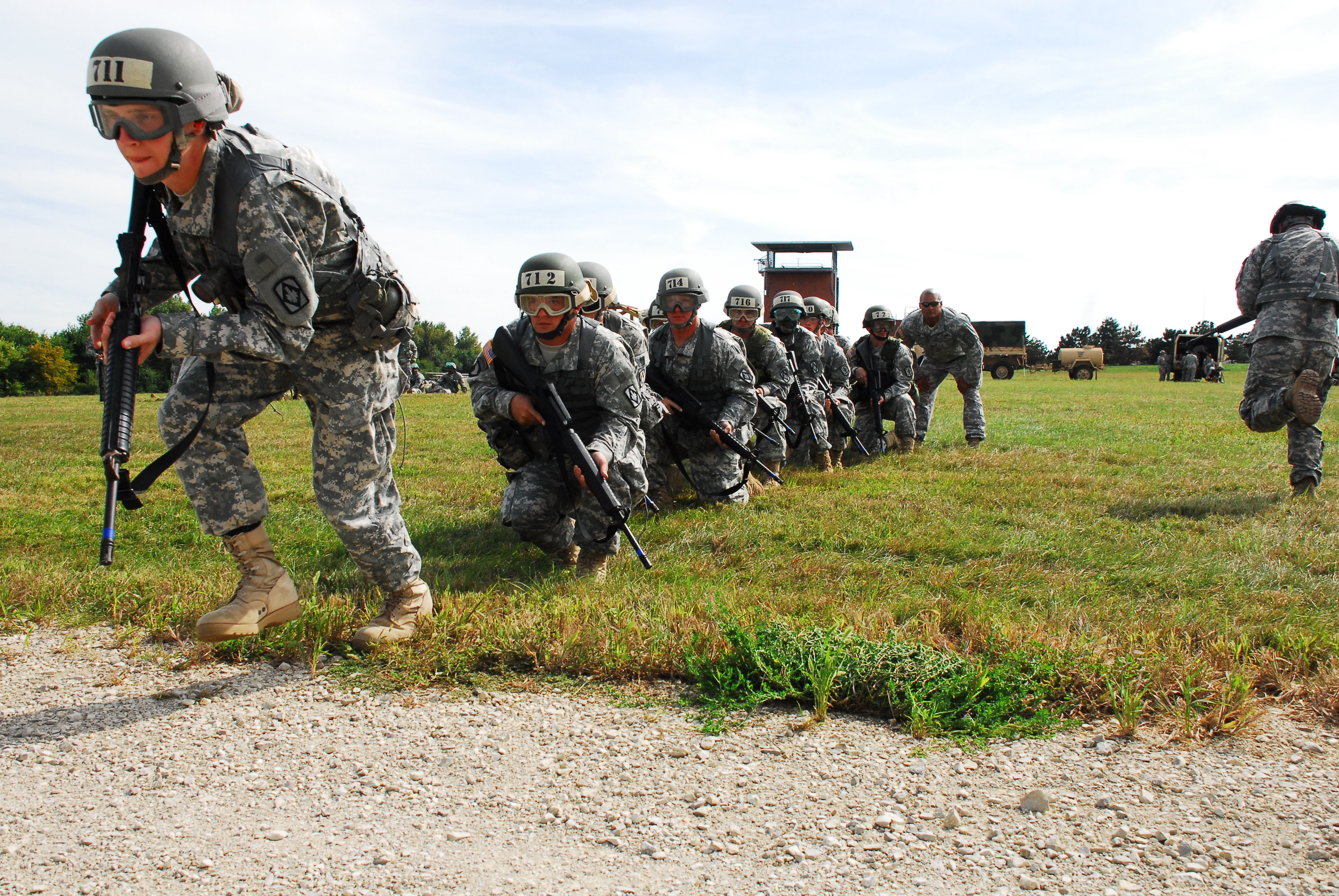
Students rehearse ground maneuvers during Combat Assault Phase

During the 3-day Phase One (Combat Assault), soldiers receive instruction in:

- Aircraft Safety
- Aircraft Orientation: characteristics and capabilities of Army aircraft
- Aero Medical Evacuation: the capabilities of and request procedures for MEDEVAC aircraft
- Pathfinder Operations: landing-zone selection, marking and operation for day and night missions involving multiple aircraft, including sling loads
- Hand-and-arm signals: 17 hand-and-arm signals used during sling load operations
- Close Combat Attacks: use of attack for close air support
- Combat Assault Operations: includes various factors encompassed in an air assault operation such as: components of an air assault mission, the reverse planning sequence, duties and responsibilities of platoon-level personnel during an air assault, static load training, and a simulated combat assault on UH-60 aircraft

Soldiers are given two tests: a written test of 50 multiple-choice questions and a test of 10 of 16 hand-and-arm signals. Students must get at least 70% of the questions and seven of the signals right to pass and advance to the Sling Load Phase. They are allowed one retest per exam.

==== Phase Two (Slingload Operations) ====
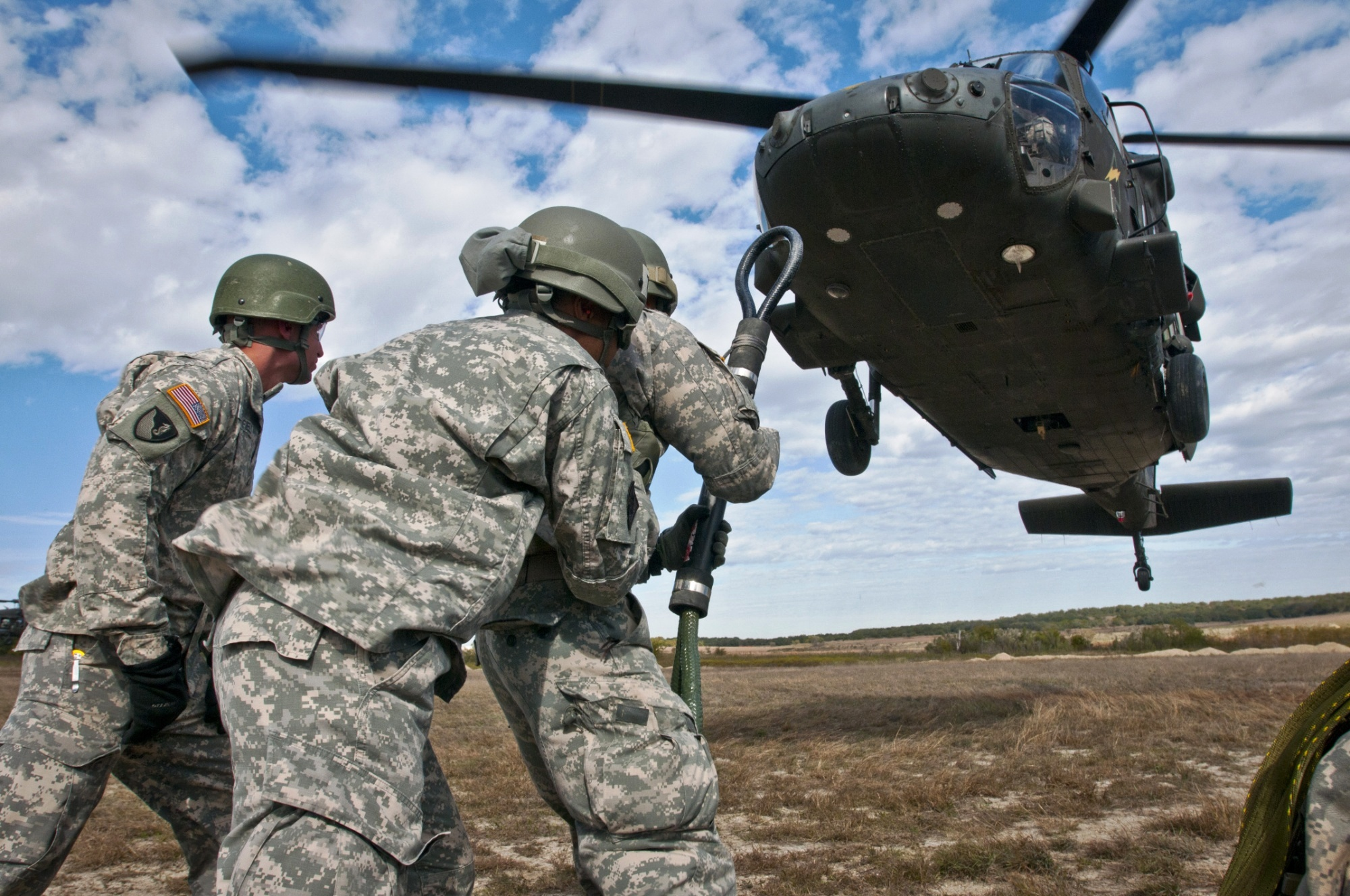
Students brace against the rotor-wash of a UH-60 Black Hawk as they prepare to attach a sling load during one of the practical exercises.

Air Assault School—slingload (1:02)
Soldiers from the Army National Guard Warrior Training Center conduct slingload training as part of phase 2 of Air Assault School at Camp Buehring

The three days of Phase Two (Slingload Operations) includes training on:

- Planning and preparation for sling load operations
- Capabilities, characteristics, and use of sling load equipment
- Duties and responsibilities of sling load personnel
- Familiarization with sling load theory and rigging of non-standard loads

Students receive hands-on training on preparation, rigging, and inspection of several certified or suitable external loads. These may include the following loads:

- M1097 HMMWV
- M1097 HMMWV, shotgun/side-by-side configuration
- M1151 HMMWV
- M119 105mm Howitzer
- M149A2 Water Trailer
- A-22 Cargo Bag
- Fuel Blivets (one, two, three, or four blivit configuration)
- 2,250 or 4,500 kg (4,960 or 9,920 lb) Cargo Net

The soldiers will also conduct an actual hook-up of a load underneath a CH-47 or UH-60 aircraft.

Soldiers must pass two tests to move on to the next phase:

- Written: Soldiers must correctly answer 70 percent of 50 multiple-choice questions to receive a "GO".
- Hands-on: Students are tested on four of the six loads taught. Students must identify three out of four preparation and/or rigging deficiencies within two minutes per load to receive a "GO".

Soldiers are allowed one retest per exam.

==== Phase Three – Rappelling Phase ====
Air Assault School—Rappelling (1:39)
Soldiers from the Army National Guard Warrior Training Center conduct rappelling training as part of phase 3 of Air Assault School at Camp Buehring

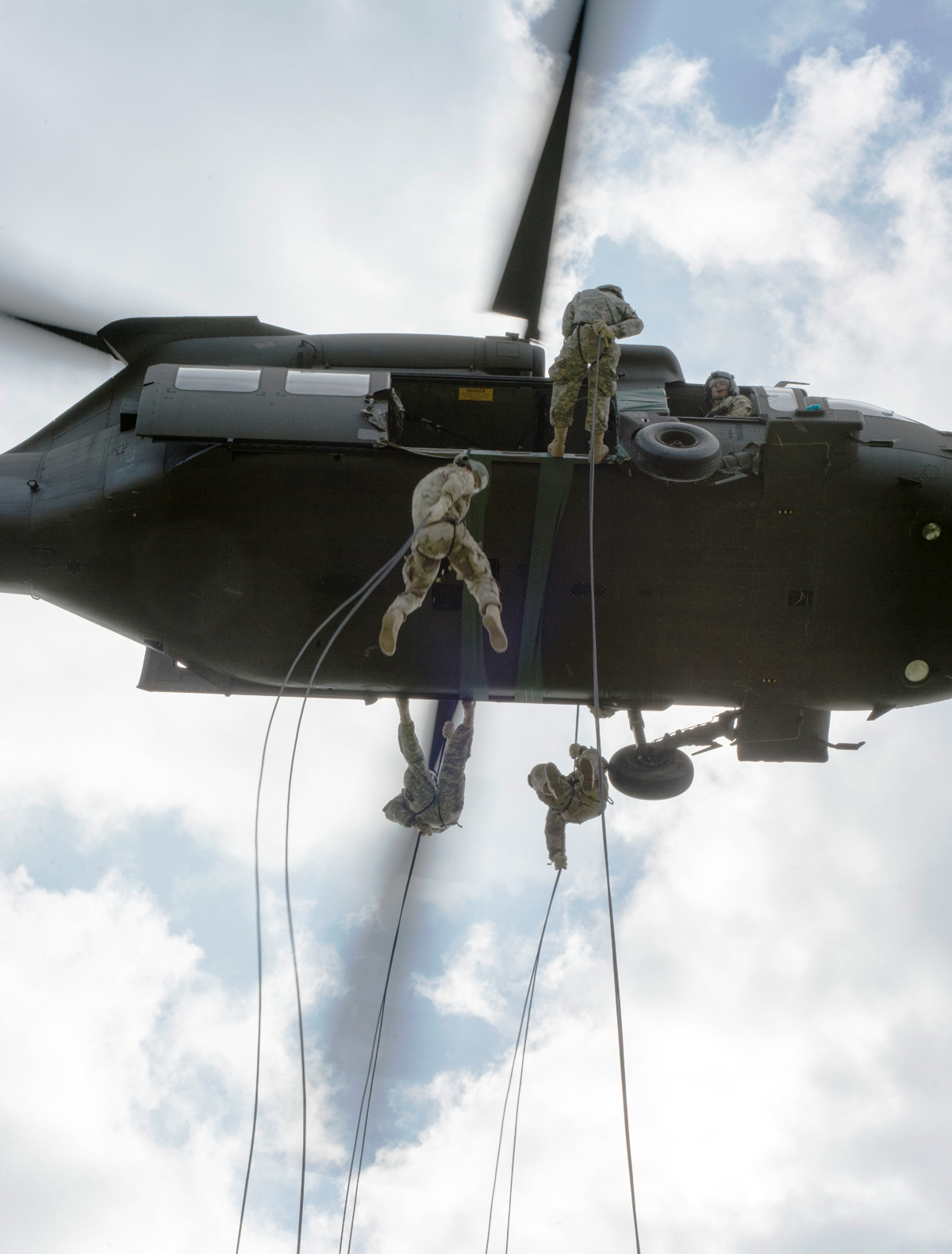
Students practice rappelling from a UH-60 Black Hawk during Air Assault School

The 3-day Phase Three (Rappelling Phase) includes instruction on basic ground and aircraft rappelling procedures:

- Tying of the hip-rappel seat (Swiss seat)
- Hook-up techniques
- Lock-in procedures
- Rappel with and without combat equipment
- Belay procedures
- Fast rope familiarization

Soldiers conduct two rappels on the wall side of the school's 34-foot (10 m) tower, 9 to 12 rappels from the open side, and two rappels from a UH-60 Blackhawk helicopter hovering at 21–27 m (69–89 ft). All rappels are conducted with and without combat equipment. During fast rope familiarization, students conduct a controlled descent and a static hold for five seconds. Students that successfully conduct both descents from a 12-foot (3.7 m) platform then descend from the 34-foot (10 m) tower using the stack-out/rapid exit technique. Fast rope descents are conducted without combat equipment. Soldiers are tested on:

- Tie the Hip rappel (Swiss) seat (the 90-second time limit has been reinstated)
- Hook-up to a rappel rope without deficiency (the 15-second time limit has been reinstated)
- Conduct three rappels: lock-in rappel, rappel without combat equipment (also known as a "Hollywood" rappel) with three controlled brakes, and combat equipment rappel with three controlled brakes

Soldiers must pass all tests to move on to the next phase; they are allowed one retest per exam. The standards of this course are so strict because failure to master the skills increases the chances of an accident. The margin for error in this type of training is small.

==== 12-mile ruck march ====
The final event is the 12-mile (19 km) ruck march, which soldiers must complete with the prescribed uniform and equipment in three hours or less or fail to graduate. Upon completion of the ruck march, soldiers lay out all items in the packing list. A lack of any item prevents the soldier from graduating.

=== Graduation ===
- Graduates are awarded the Air Assault Badge and the 2B ASI (Additional Skill Identifier) unless they did not come out of the helicopter qualified to inspect rigged sling loads.
- Graduates in the rank of Corporal (E-4) and above are qualified to perform as rappel lane NCOs for ground rappel training and are eligible to attend the Rappel Master Course.
- Graduates in the rank of Sergeant First Class (E-7) or above are qualified to serve as a rappel site Safety Officer for ground and aircraft rappelling.

=== History ===
The original Air Assault School is located at Fort Campbell, home of the 101st Airborne Division. There are also or have been schools at:

- Fort Rucker, Alabama
- Schofield Barracks, Hawaii
- Fort Hood, Texas
- Fort Bliss, Texas
- Camp Blanding, Florida
- Fort Benning, Georgia
- Fort Drum, New York
- Fort Johnson, Louisiana
- Fort Ord, California
- Fort Riley, Kansas
- Fort Richardson, Alaska
- Fort Wainwright, Alaska
- Fort Belvoir, Virginia
- Fort Bragg, North Carolina
- Camp Gruber, Oklahoma
- West Point, New York
- Fulda Army Airfield, Germany

Graduation from the Air Assault School is not required to be a soldier in the 101st, but it is looked upon as an achievement of excellence by the chain of command.

In 1998, Fort Campbell built a 34-foot (10 m) tower for use in Phase Three.

On 17 December 1999, the new Sabalauski Air Assault School facility was dedicated and for the first time in several years all phases of instruction were conducted at one facility.

== See also ==
- United States Army Pathfinder School
- Battle of Signal Hill
- Battle of Ia Drang
- United States Army Reconnaissance and Surveillance Leaders Course
- United States Army Airborne School
