= Ice cream barge =

Frozen food store ship and dessert factory

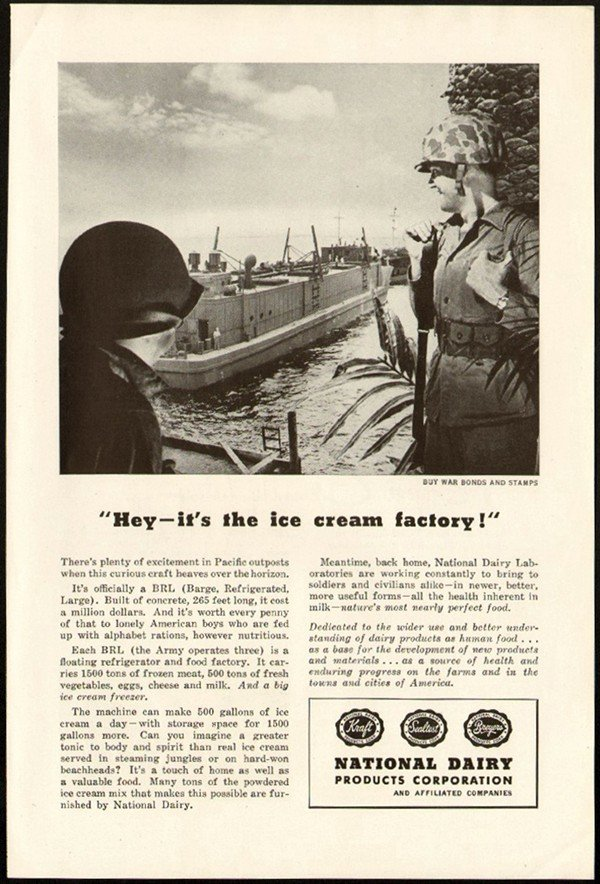
A 1945 advertisement for the National Dairy Products Corporation describing the ice cream barge

"Ice cream barge" is the colloquial term for a BRL (Barge, Refrigerated, Large). BRLs were towed vessels employed by the United States Navy in the Pacific theater of World War II to store frozen and refrigerated foodstuffs. They were also able to produce ice cream in large quantities to be provisioned to sailors and US Marines. Three in total were produced: USS Hydrogen, USS Calcium, and USS Antimony. The ships, concrete barges acquired from the US Army and worth one million dollars, stored 1,500 tons of frozen meat and 500 tons of refrigerated vegetables, eggs, and dairy products indefinitely at 15 °F (−9 °C). To improve the morale of overseas troops, an ice cream freezer facility was included, able to create 10 US gallons (38 L) of ice cream every seven minutes, or approximately 500 US gal (1,900 L) per shift (equivalent to five tons per day), and could store 2,000 US gal (7,600 L). They were employed in the U.S. Navy's Western Pacific area of operations, at one point anchored at Naval Base Ulithi. The army built three concrete barges of its own.

Some accounts link the U.S. Navy's 1914 alcohol prohibition under General Order No. 99 to ice cream becoming a common morale-boosting substitute for sailors.

== Design and construction ==
A 1945 article in Pacific Marine Review reported that three BRL-type refrigerated concrete barges (Hulls Nos. 45, 46 and 47) were completed by Concrete Ship Constructors at National City, California, and delivered to the U.S. Army. The same report described a reinforced concrete hull 265 feet (81 m) long, 48 feet (15 m) in beam and 17 feet (5.2 m) in depth, with an insulated wooden deckhouse and diesel-driven generators supplying power for the refrigeration machinery, including two 50-ton York ice machines.

=== BRL-3071 ===
The U.S. Navy logistics history Beans, Bullets, and Black Oil describes BRL-3071 as "a 1,000-ton refrigerated provision storage barge" at Buckner Bay (Okinawa). In early August 1945, the stores ship Latona began unloading cargo into BRL-3071 for refrigerated storage and issue ashore/afloat.

BRL-3071 also appears in the Navy and Marine Corps Awards Manual (rev. 1953) campaign participation listings with credited service dates from 13 to 30 June 1945.

== USS Lexington anecdote ==
Later accounts of U.S. Navy ice-cream culture often cite the loss of the aircraft carrier Lexington during the Battle of the Coral Sea on 8 May 1942. In a 2017 U.S. Navy feature, Lexington survivor Julius "Harry" Frey recalled breaking into the ship's "geedunk" (snack bar) with a fire axe and using his helmet to carry pineapple sherbet to shipmates as the crew prepared to abandon ship. A 2017 article in The Atlantic similarly reported survivors describing sailors breaking into freezers and scooping ice cream into helmets during the abandonment.

== See also ==
- USS Mizar (AF-12), a class of converted civilian refrigerated food carriers also used by the US Navy
