= Military Free Fall Parachute System =

High-altitude parachute delivery system

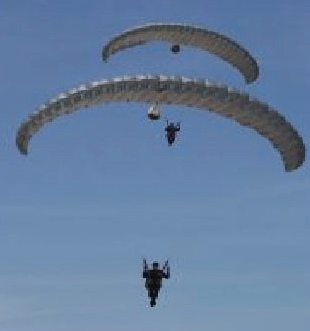
Demonstration of the Hi Glide 6-to-1 standoff flight characteristics, ca. 2009

The RA-1 Military Free-Fall Advanced Ram-Air Parachute System (MFF ARAPS) provides a multi-mission, high-altitude parachute delivery system that allows personnel to exit at altitudes between 3,500 and 35,000 ft (1,100 and 10,700 m). The parachute, which replaces the current MC-4 parachute, supports a total jumper weight of 450 pounds. It also provides non-MFF personnel with a ram-air parachute that is static-line deployed.

The ARAPS’ three accessory systems are at different stages of the acquisition process:

- The Electronic Automatic Activation Device (EAAD) is used with current and next-generation parachute systems, replacing the Automatic Ripcord Release. EAAD provides a simpler and more reliable method of activation in the event the parachutist is unable to deploy the parachute at the appropriate altitude. The EAAD activates and cuts the reserve parachute closing loops if the jumper is falling at 78 mph or faster at the minimum deployment altitude.
- The Navigation Aid (NAVAID) will provide in-flight navigation and mission planning capability, allowing parachutists under canopy to locate themselves and the intended drop zone easily. The system uses a GPS that integrates with the Mission Planner of the Joint Precision Airdrop System (MP JPADS), ensuring more accurate canopy flight and drop zone landings.
- The Parachutist Oxygen Mask (POM). The new current Carleton Phantom Parachutist Oxygen Mask which has replaced the previous Pilot based MBU-12/P mask which was first introduced back in 1976, will provide supplemental oxygen at 13,000 ft (4,000 m) and higher and will be easier to use and maintain than the previous mask. The POM will not interfere with the parachutist’s vision or range of motion.

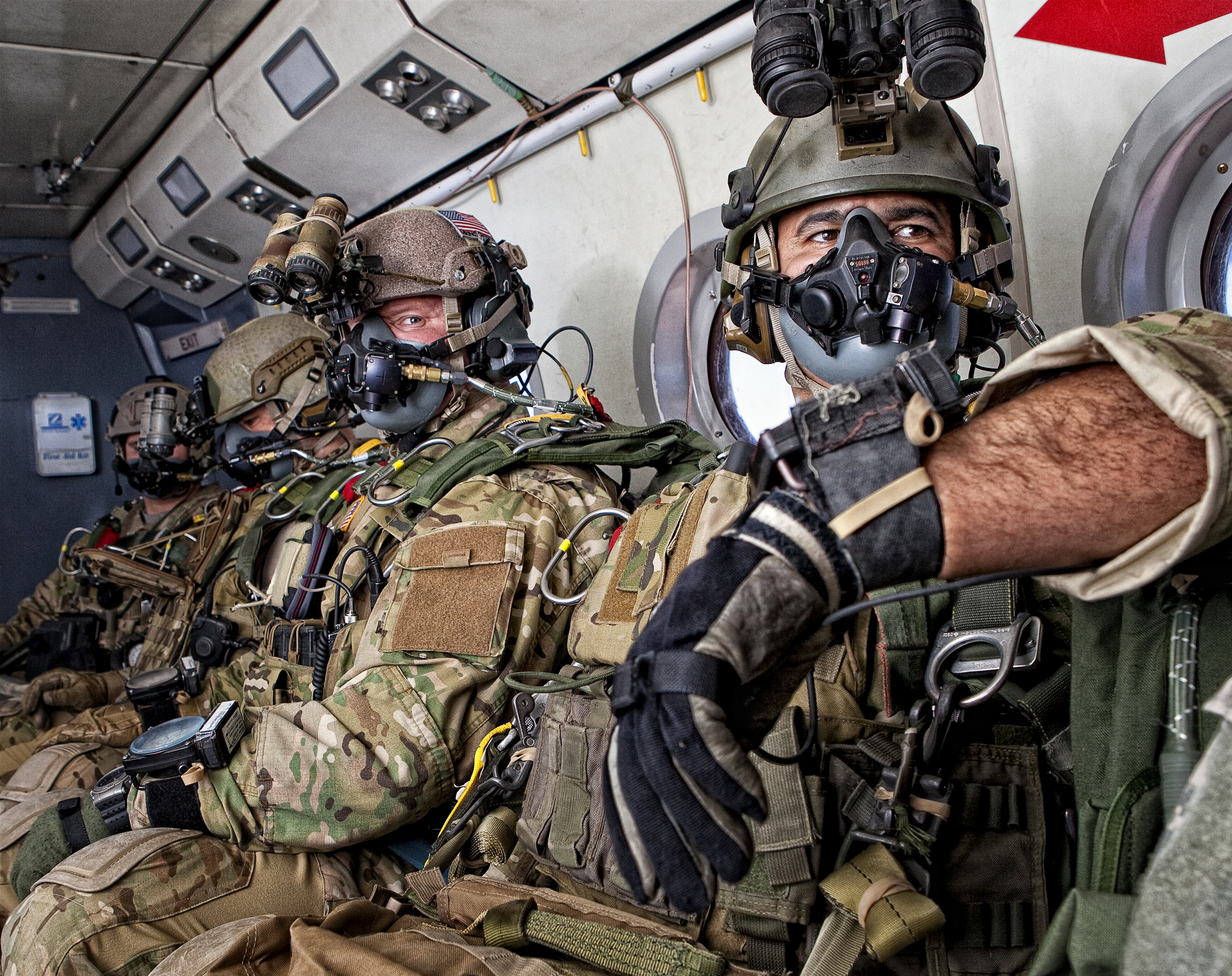
Military Free-Fall Advanced Tactical Infiltration Course students use new POM for high–altitude / high–opening jump, ca. 2011

Testing of new RA-1 parachute packing procedures and navigation aides, ca. 2016

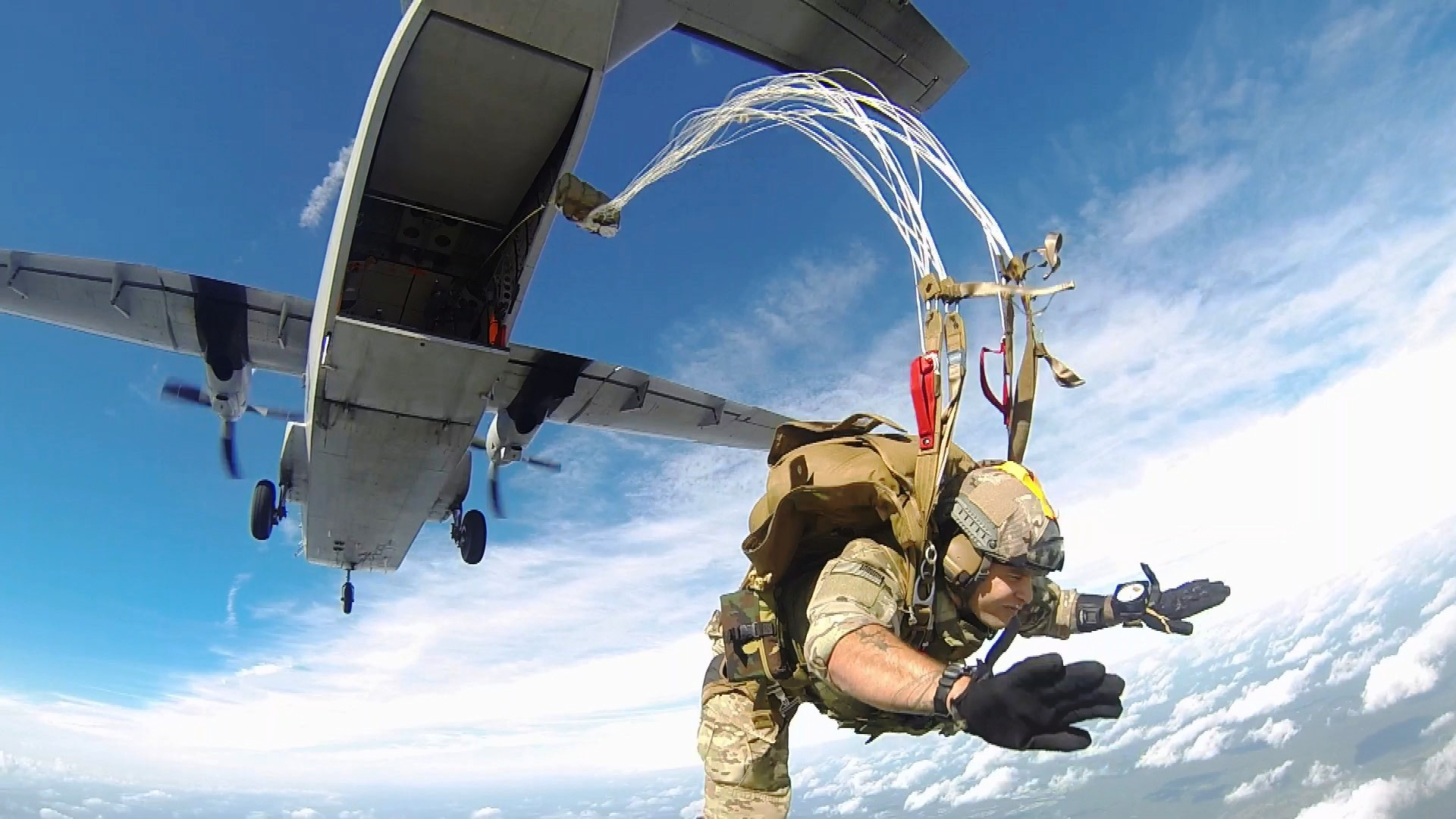
Testing of new RA-1 double-bag static-line deployment system, ca. 2018

== See also ==
- Military Freefall Parachutist Badge
- United States Army Parachute Team – Golden Knights
- United States Army Maneuver Center of Excellence Command Exhibition Parachute Team – Silver Wings
- United States Special Operations Command Parachute Team - Para-Commandos
