= Military Freefall Parachutist Badge =

- Military Freefall Parachutist Badge
- Type: Badge
- Awarded for: Qualification as a high-altitude parachutist
- Presented by: U.S. Army and U.S. Air Force
- Status: Currently awarded
- First award: 1 October 1994
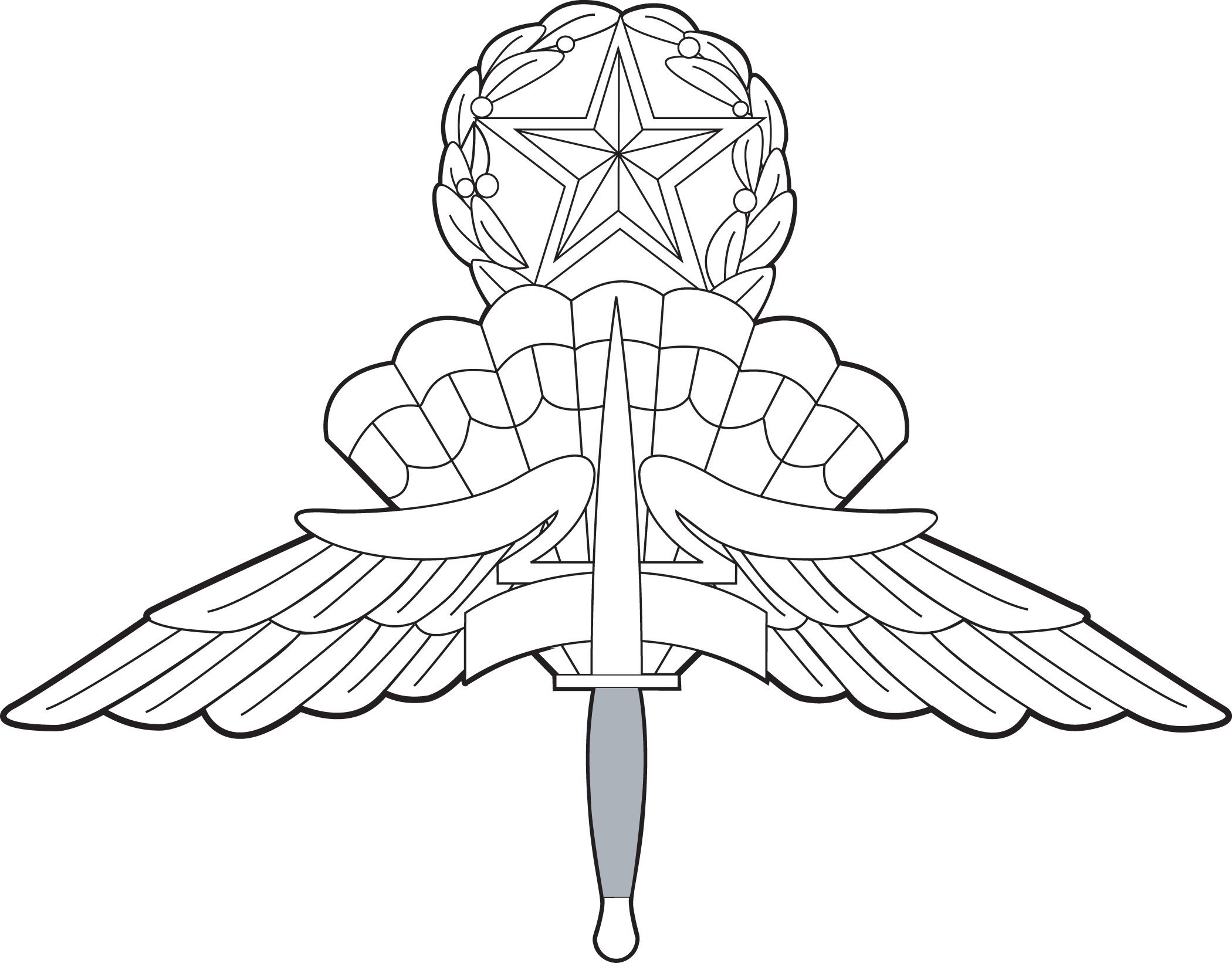
- Master Military Freefall Parachutist Badge

Army Precedence
- Next (higher): Parachute Rigger Badge
- Next (lower): Army Aviator Badges

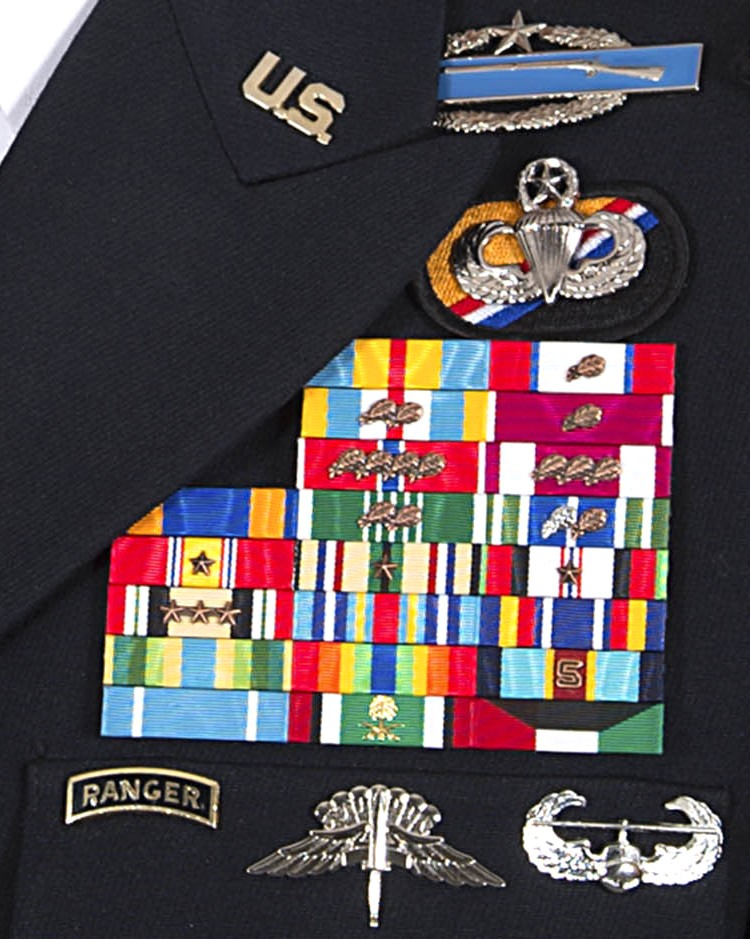
Example of wear of the military freefall parachutist badge on the Army Service Uniform (bottom-center)

The military freefall parachutist badge is a military badge of the United States Army and United States Air Force awarded to qualified U.S. Army and U.S. Air Force personnel as high-altitude military parachute specialists.

== Qualifications ==
To earn the military freefall parachutist badge, the military member first must receive all necessary ground training, already have earned the military parachutist badge (jump-qualified), and must have completed the requisite freefall (night, combat equipment, oxygen) jumps and graduate from the Military Free-Fall Parachutist Course.

A star and laurel wreath, centered above the badge, called the master military freefall parachutist badge, is authorized for U.S. Army Soldiers and U.S. Air Force Airmen qualified as a Master Military Freefall Parachutist (Jumpmaster). Such qualification requires completing the Military Free-Fall Jumpmaster Course, wherein the student learns how to be a jumpmaster in military freefall operations.

== Combat jump devices ==
As with the U.S. Army's military parachutist badge, small bronze and gold stars are placed on the badge to represent participation in combat jumps, known as Combat Jump Devices, and can be awarded with either the basic and master versions of the badge. To earn the device, a Military Freefall Parachutist must have conducted a high-altitude/low-opening (HALO) or high-altitude/high-opening (HAHO) jump in a war zone. The stars are awarded as follows:

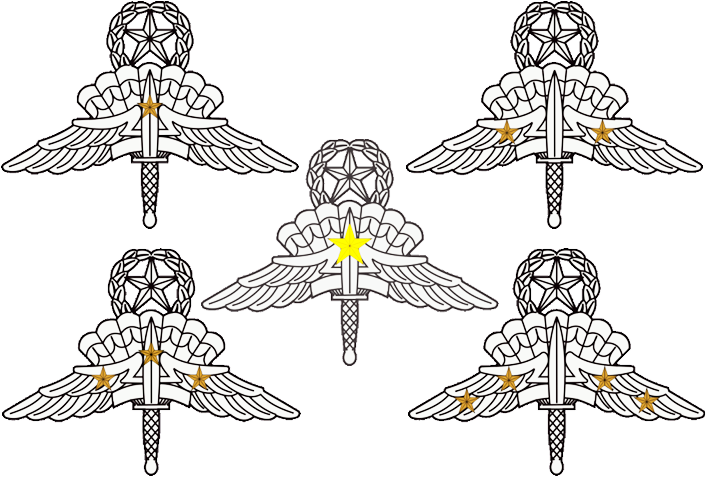
Combat jump device placement on military freefall parachutist badges
One combat jump	A bronze star centered on the dagger
Two combat jumps	A bronze star on each wing
Three combat jumps	A bronze star on each wing and one centered on the dagger
Four combat jumps	Two bronze stars on each wing
Five + combat jumps	A large gold star centered on the dagger

List of published U.S. combat high-altitude parachute jumps of the U.S. Army
Date	Unit	Operation	Troopers	Country	Dropzone
28 November 1970	Recon Team Florida, CCN, MACV-SOG (HALO)	Vietnam Conflict	3 Americans, 1 ARVN officer and 2 Montagnards	Laos	NVA road inside Laos
7 May 1971	Captain Larry Manes' Recon Team, CCN, MACV-SOG (HALO)	Vietnam Conflict	4	South Vietnam	Between Ashau Valley and Khe Sanh, NVA trail extension of Laotian Highway 921
22 June 1971	Sergeant Major Billy Waugh's Recon Team, CCN, MACV-SOG (HALO)	Vietnam Conflict	4	South Vietnam	60 miles SW of Danang
22 Sep. 1971	Captain Jim Storter's Recon Team, CCC, MACV-SOG (HALO)	Vietnam Conflict	4	South Vietnam	Plei Trap Valley, NW of Pleiku
11 October 1971	Sergeant First Class Dick Gross' Recon Team, CCC, MACV-SOG (HALO)	Vietnam Conflict	5	South Vietnam	25 miles, SW of Pleiku in the Ia Drang Valley
15 January 1991	1st Special Forces Operational Detachment-Delta (HAHO)	Operation Desert Shield	12	Iraq	Northwest desert
3 July 2004	75th Ranger Regiment, Regimental Reconnaissance Detachment, Team 3 (HALO)	Operation Enduring Freedom		Afghanistan	Southeastern region
30 May 2007	10th Special Forces Group, 3rd Battalion, ODA 074 (HALO)	Operation Iraqi Freedom	11	Iraq	Ninewah Province
11 July 2009	75th Ranger Regiment, Regimental Reconnaissance Company, Team 1	Operation Enduring Freedom		Afghanistan	

== History of the badge's design ==
The story behind the creation of the U.S. Military Freefall Parachutist Badge (7:30)

The original design of the Military Freefall Parachutists Badge was submitted in March 1983 by Sergeant First Class Gregory A. Dailey of Special Forces ODA-552, Company B, 2nd Battalion, 5th Special Forces Group. Updates on the design, adding a master military freefall parachutist badge, were submitted by General Wayne A. Downing of U.S. Special Operations Command (USSOCOM) and James Phillips of the Special Forces Association. The badges were approved for wear by U.S. Army soldiers assigned to U.S. Army Special Operations Command (USASOC) on 1 October 1994. Unrestricted wear was approved on 7 July 1997 by General Dennis Reimer.

Symbolism of the badge's design:

- The dagger is a Fairbairn–Sykes fighting knife, used by the Office of Strategic Services during World War II, and represents infiltration techniques.
- The arched tab represents tabs worn by special operations forces.
- The parachute is a seven-celled MT1-X, the first ram-air parachute to be adopted by the U.S. Military as the standard freefall canopy.
- The wings represent flight and airborne capabilities.

== Freefall training ==
Historical Example of Freefall Training
U.S. Army Special Forces paratroopers conducting HALO training in 1966

The U.S. Military Free-Fall School (MFFS) is operated by the USASOC's John F. Kennedy Special Warfare Center and School (SWCS), 2nd Special Warfare Training Group (Airborne), 2nd Battalion, Company B at the U.S. Army's Yuma Proving Ground (YPG) in Arizona, which is the USSOCOM proponent for military freefall. The MFFS conducts four primary training courses, the Military Free-Fall Parachutist Course, the Military Free-Fall Jumpmaster Course, the Military Free-Fall Advanced Tactical Infiltration Course, and the Military Free-Fall Instructor Course. The U.S. Air Force also conducts the Military Free-Fall Jumpmaster Course—certified by the MFFS—at Davis–Monthan Air Force Base in Arizona for airman that are not able to attend the MFFS's jumpmaster course. Alternatively, detachments from the MFFS conduct the Military Free-Fall Jumpmaster Course via a Mobile Training Team (MTT) for military freefall units that have difficulty attending the course at the Yuma Proving Ground.

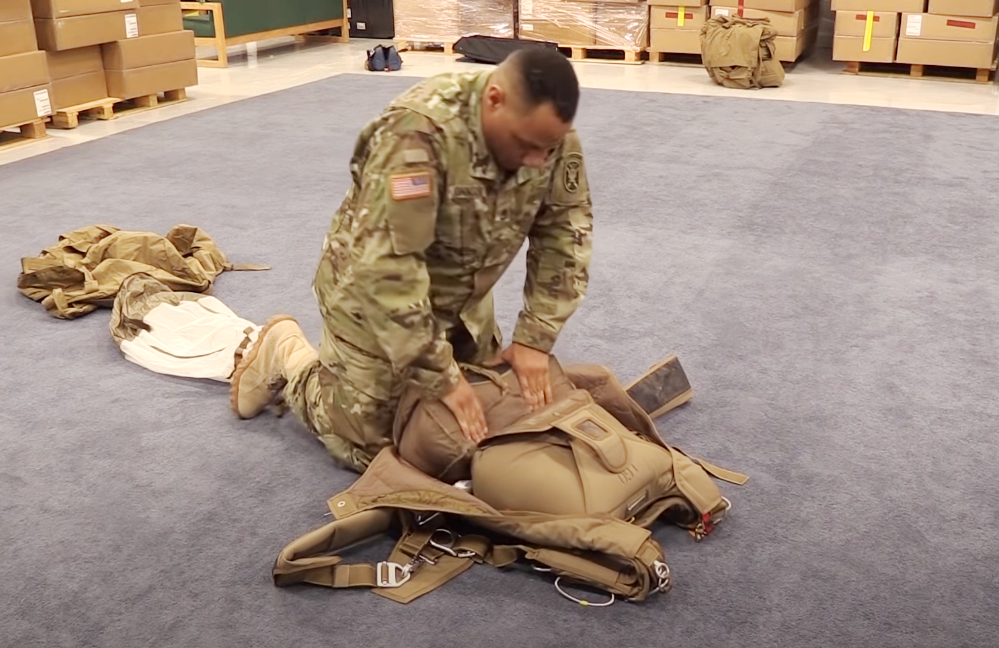
A Parachute Rigger from SWCS demonstrates the proper packing procedure for the RA-1 main parachute

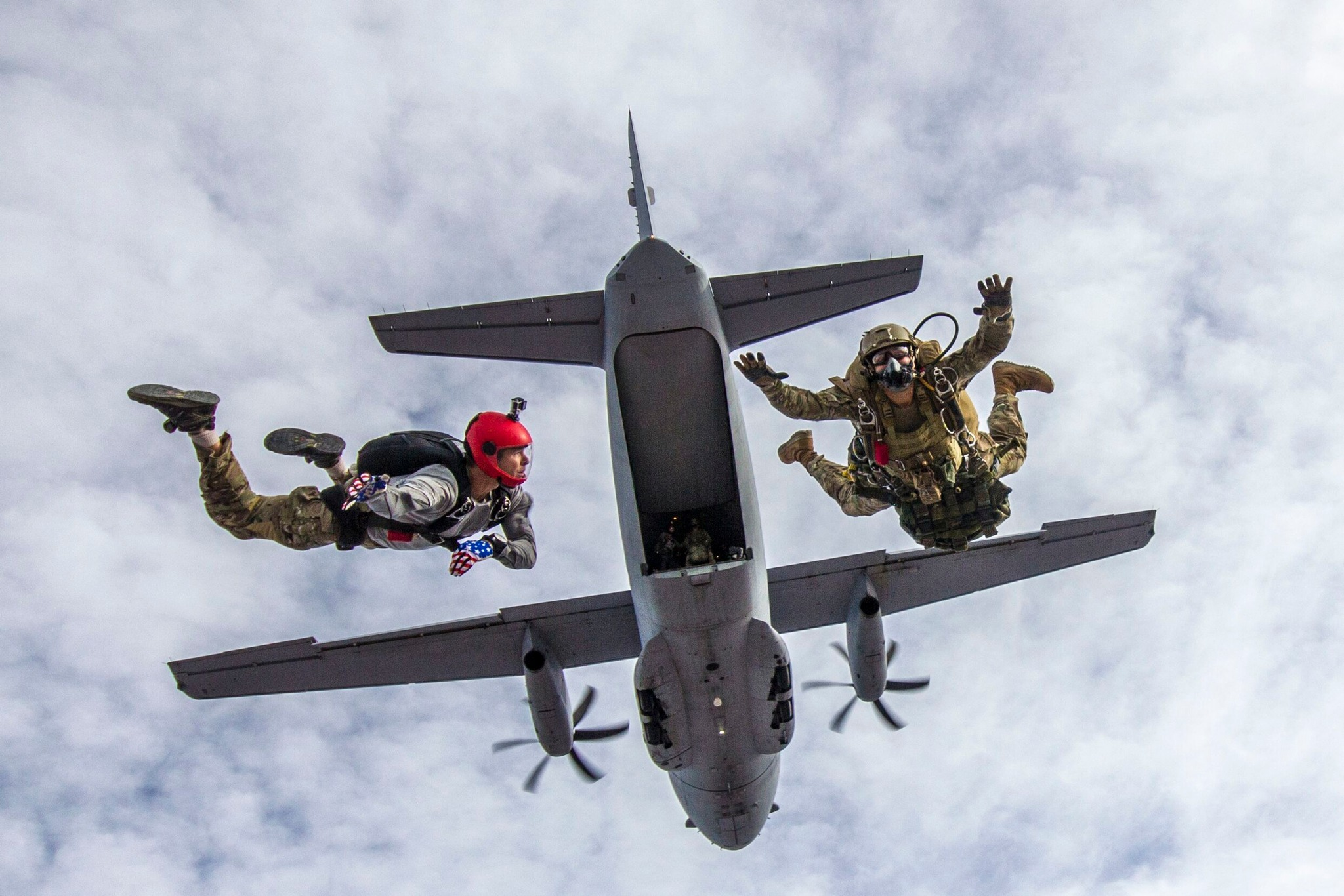
An instructor and a MFFS student fall from a C-27J practicing freefall techniques over YPG

The Military Free-Fall Parachutist Course (MFFPC) is open to special operations forces assigned to military freefall coded positions, parachute riggers, and select DoD civilian personnel or allied personnel assigned to military freefall positions. To attend MFFPC, students must have graduated from the U.S. Army Airborne School and must meet specific medical requirements. Week one of the four-week course focuses on vertical wind tunnel body stabilization training at the MSG George A Bannar Wind Tunnel as well as parachute packing and an introduction to military freefall operations. The remaining weeks focuses training on varying jump profiles using three airborne operations per training iteration, totaling 30 military freefall operations per course encompassing various conditions and equipment loads. At the end of the course, students will have learned how to:

- Pack the RA-1 Military Free-Fall Advanced Ram-Air Parachute System main parachute and don the system
- Rigging/jumping procedures for weapons, combat equipment, night vision goggles and portable oxygen equipment
- Aircraft procedures
- Exit an aircraft from the door and ramp using dive and poised exit positions
- Emergency procedures and body stabilization
- HALO and HAHO parachute jumps from altitudes of 10,000 ft (3,048 m) to 25,000 ft (7,620 m)

Upon completion of the MFFPC, graduates are awarded the military freefall parachutist badge.

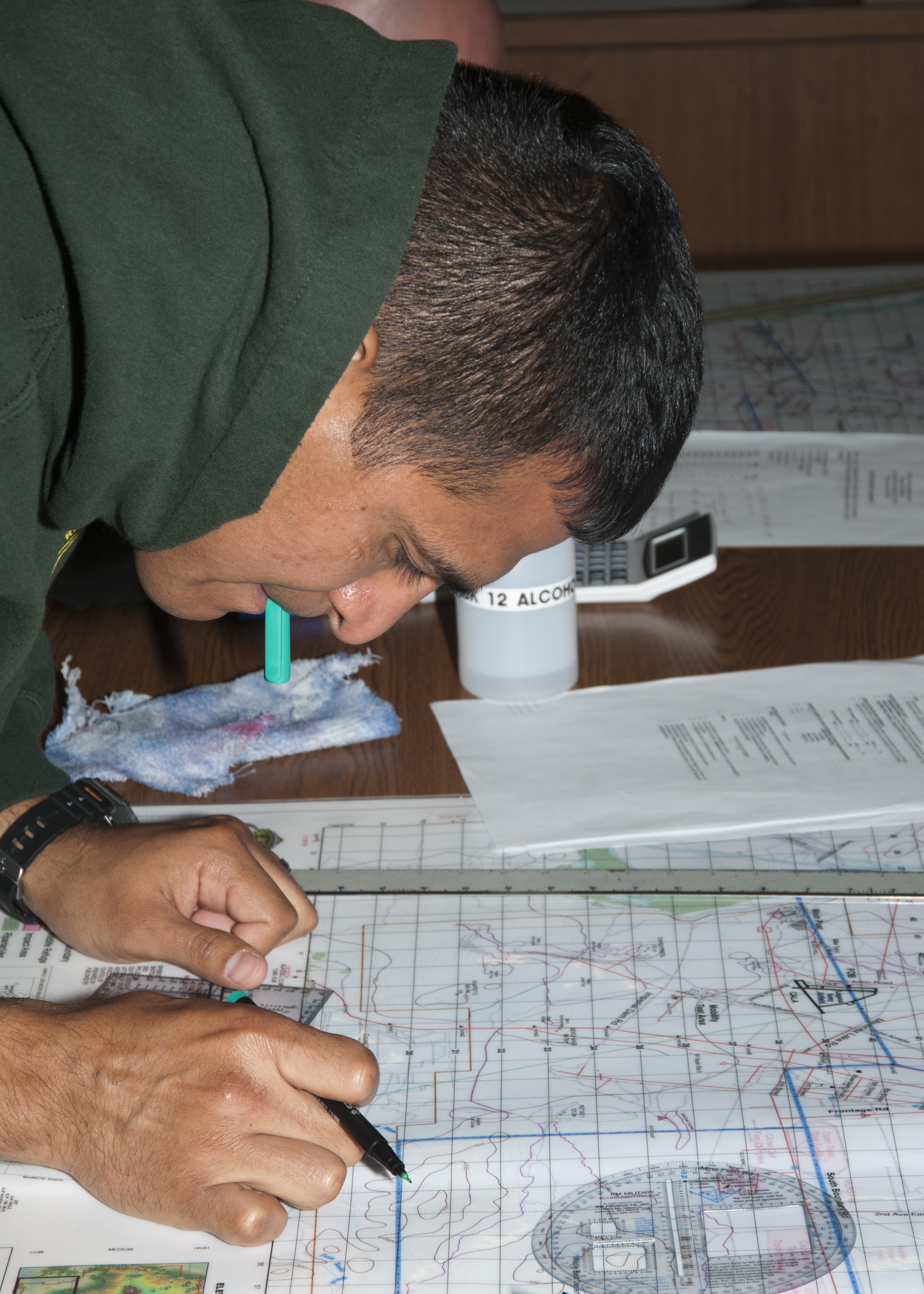
A MFFJMC student conducts HAHO operations planning at YPG

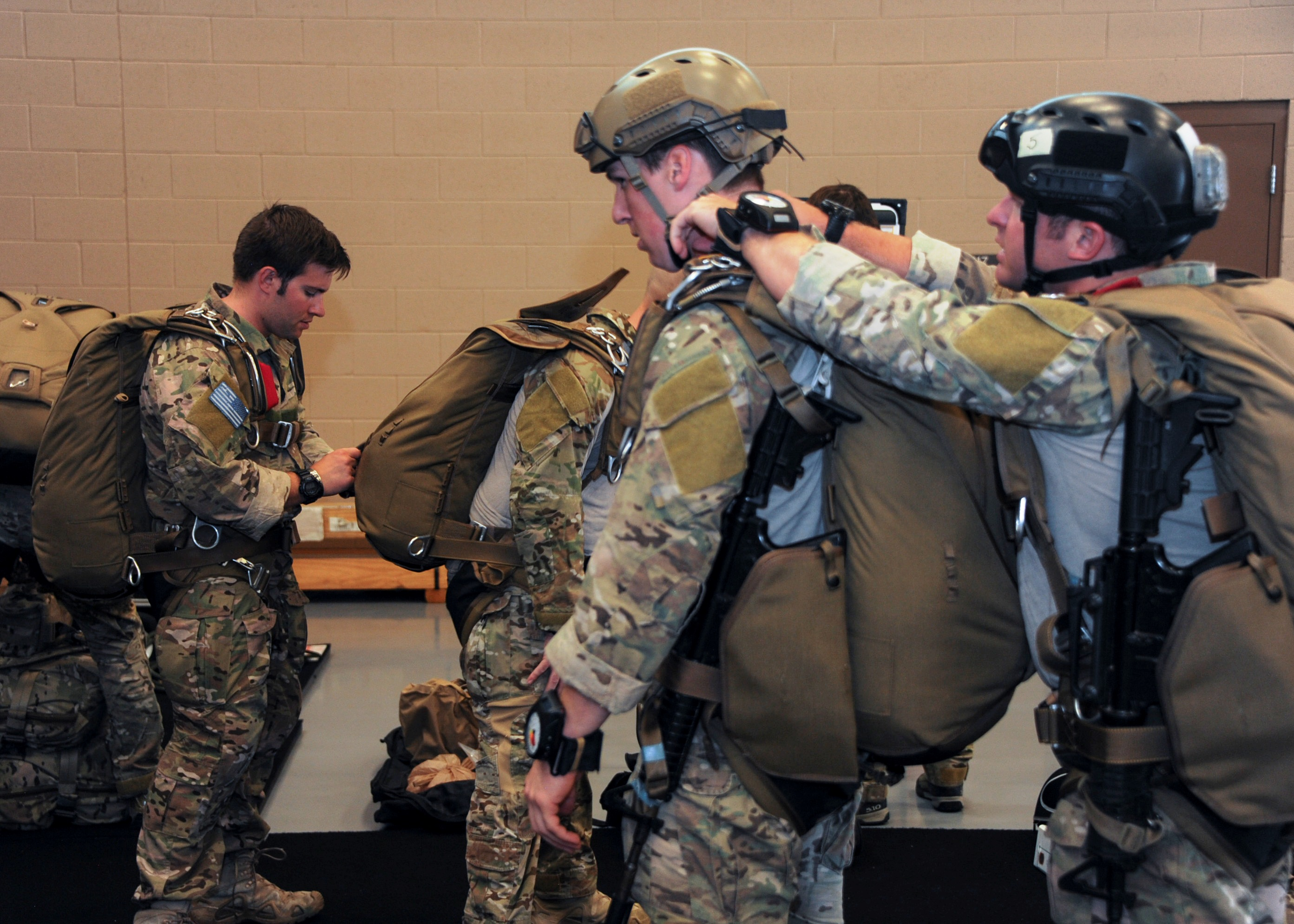
U.S. Air Force MFFJMC students practice conducting the jumpmaster personnel inspection on each other at Davis–Monthan Air Force Base

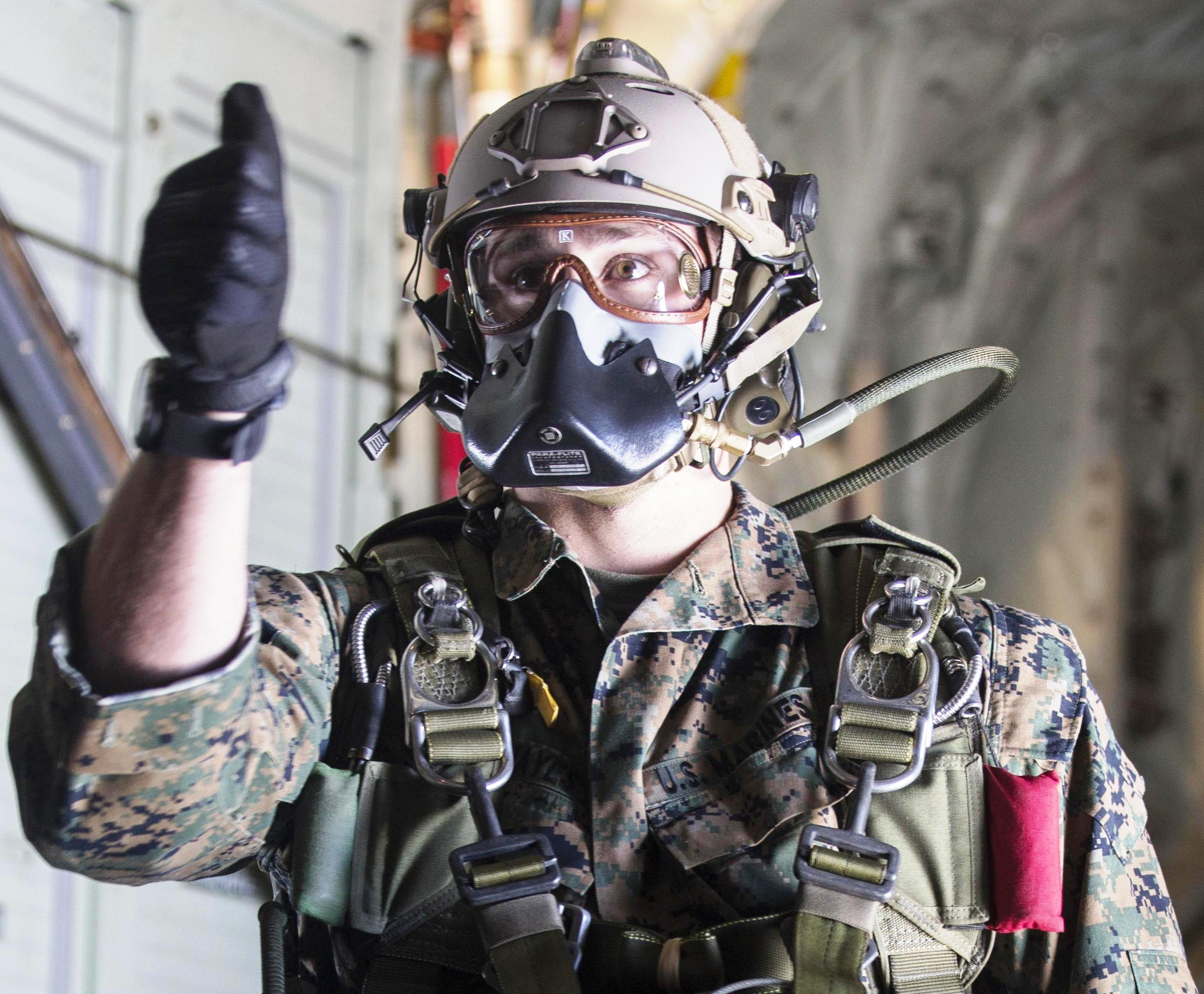
A U.S. Marine MFFJMC student gives jump commands during the MTT's first overseas course at Kadena Air Base, Japan (2017)

To attend the Military Free-Fall JumpMaster Course (MFFJMC), students must have graduated from the U.S. Army Airborne School, the MFFPC, the U.S. Army Jumpmaster School, be a current military freefall parachutist, served as a military freefall parachutist for a minimum of one year, and must have completed at least 50 military freefall jumps. The three-week MFFJMC focuses on training students on jumpmaster duties and responsibilities, such as:

- Nomenclature
- Jumpmaster personnel inspection
- Emergency procedures
- Oxygen equipment
- Wind drift calculations
- Altimeter calculations
- Emergency automatic activation device calculations
- Jump commands
- Aircraft procedures
- Techniques of spotting
- HAHO techniques
- Various ram-air parachute systems packing and rigging

Upon completion of the MFFJMC, graduates are awarded the master military freefall parachutist badge.

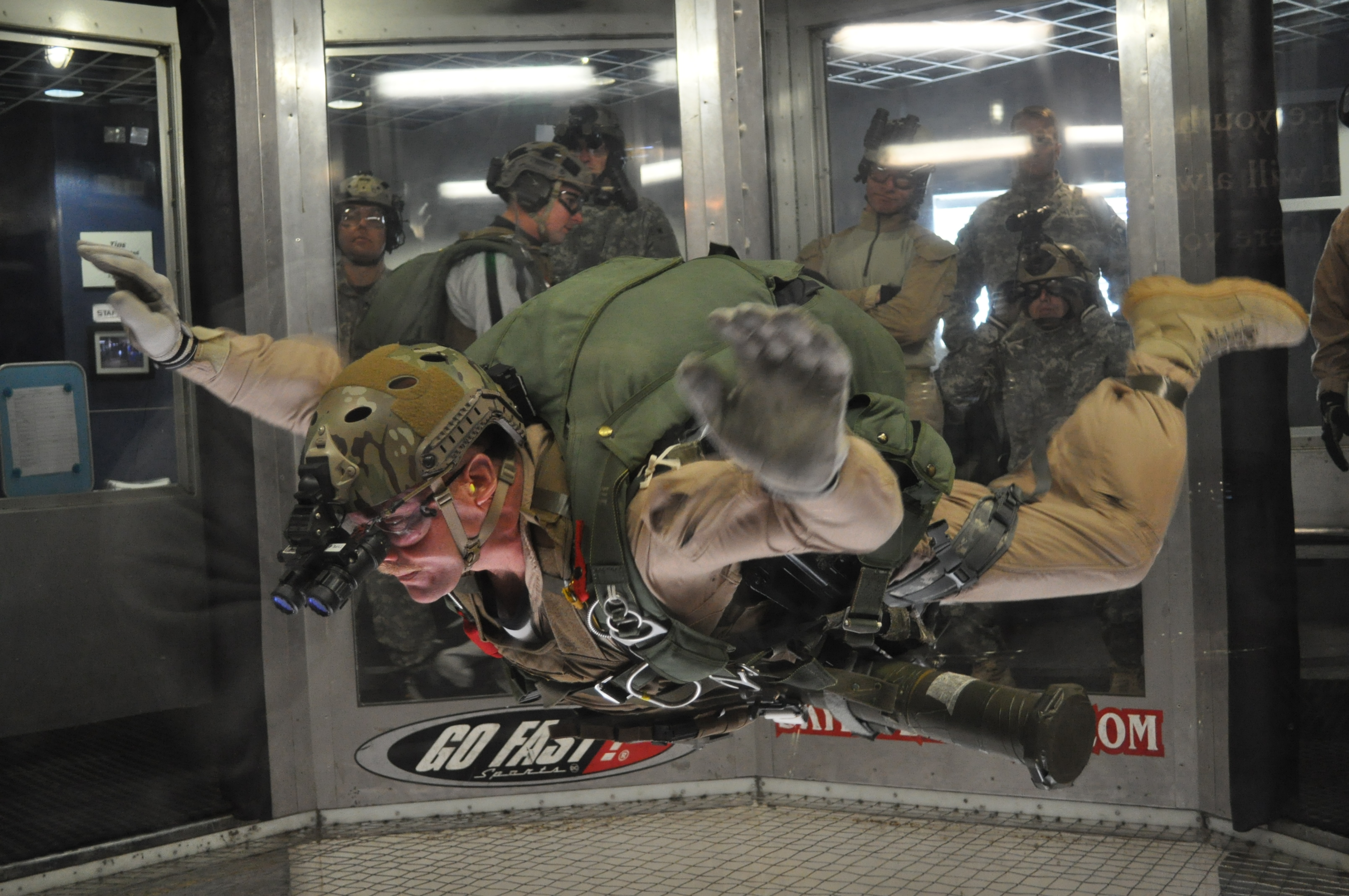
A MFFATIC student practices freefall techniques with various equipment in the MSG George A Bannar Wind Tunnel, YPG

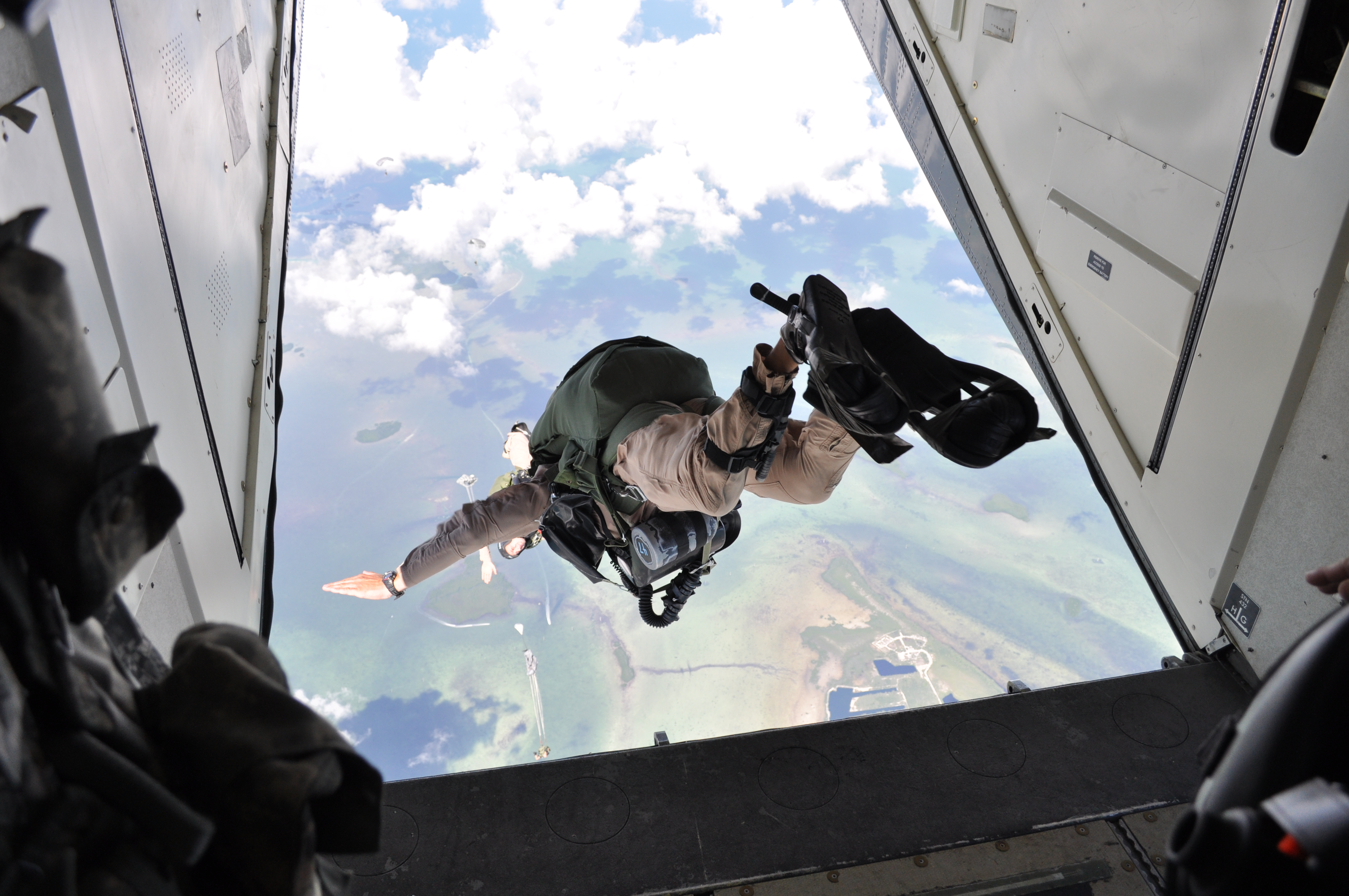
MFFATIC instructors and students conduct a HAHO water insertion operation from a C-23 off the coast of Key West, Florida

To attend the Military Free-Fall Advanced Tactical Infiltration Course (MFFATIC), students must have the same qualifications and completed the same prerequisites required of the MFFJMC. The three-week MFFATIC focuses on educating and training joint special operations forces and other selected personnel in the planning and conduct of night military freefall tactical infiltrations as a group onto unknown and unmarked drop zones. Training includes:

- Following GPS guided bundles
- Carrying various combat equipment
- Various communications
- Wearing various night vision devices
- Jumping with non-standard weapons while using oxygen equipment
- Utilization of various parachutist navigational devices

Upon completion of the MFFATIC, graduates are awarded a certificate of completion; there is no badge or badge device awarded for completion of the MFFATIC.

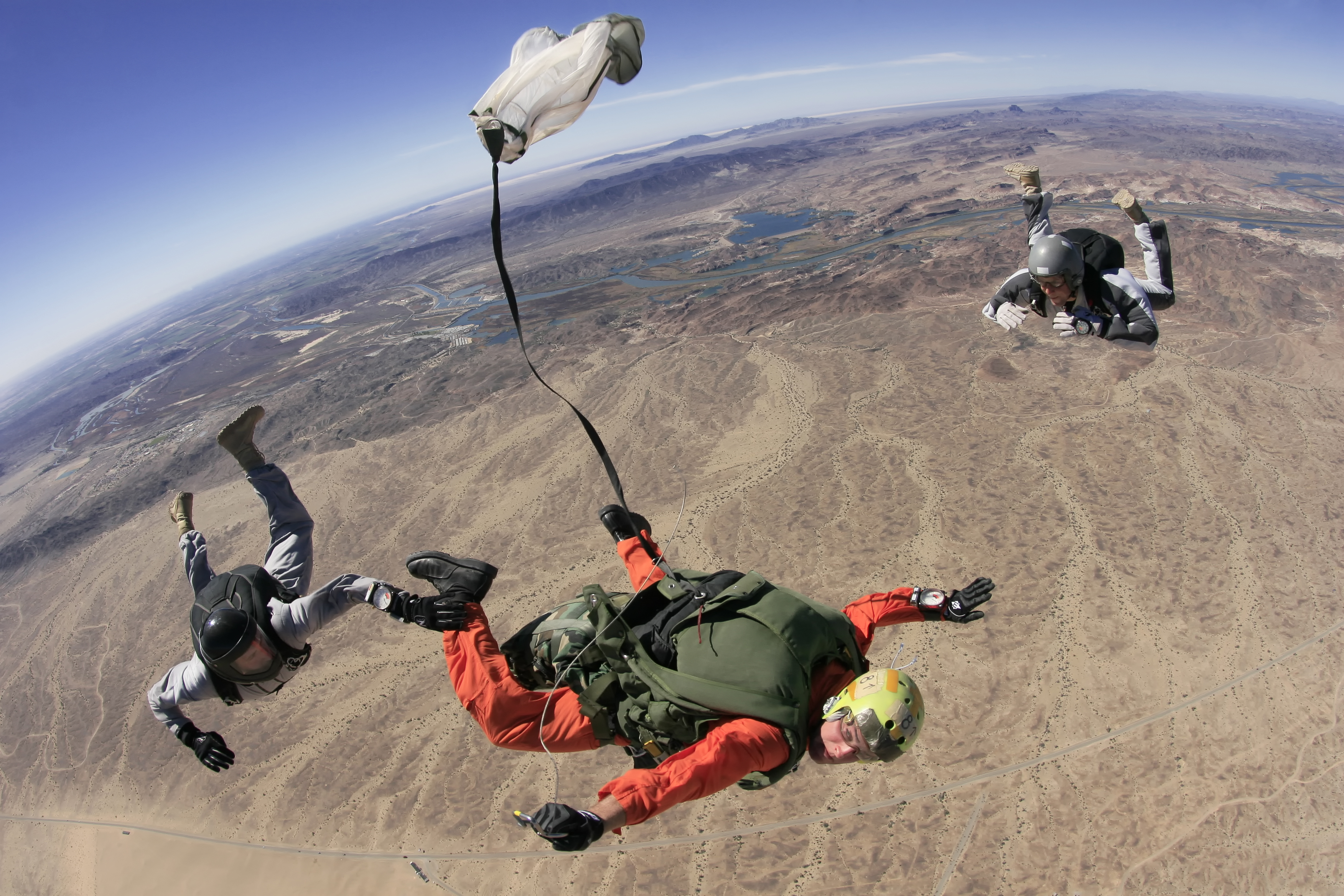
A MFFS instructor and a student-instructor assist a student as he freefalls over YPG

To attend the Military Free-Fall Instructor Course (MFFIC), students must be a commissioned officer, warrant officer, or non-commissioned officer and must have the same qualifications and completed the same prerequisites required of the MFFJMC and MFFATIC. Additionally, these students must be qualified military freefall jumpmasters, must have completed a minimum of 100 freefall parachute jumps, and must have nine months remaining in service upon graduation. The initial nine-week MFFIC focuses on the following over 150-200 freefall jumps:

- Learn how to conduct military freefall jumps from the instructor's perspective
- Jump as an instructor evaluating and coaching a current MFF instructor who plays the role of a new MFF student
- Learn how to deal with multiple instructor-induced problems during freefall commonly encountered with new MFF students

After nine weeks of fundamentals, student-instructors are placed as shadows at the MFFPC for three to six months.

Upon completion of the shadow program, graduates are awarded the Military Free-Fall Instructor Rating; there is no badge or badge device awarded for completion of the MFFIC.

== See also ==
- Parachutist Badge (United States)
- Parachutist Badge
- Parachute Rigger Badge
- Pathfinder Badge
- Badges of the United States Army
- Badges of the United States Air Force
- United States Military Parachute Rigger School
- United States Army Air Assault School
- United States Army Pathfinder School
- No. 1 Parachute Training School RAF
- Parachute Training School (Australian Army)
- Parachute Training School (Pakistan Army)
- United States Army Parachute Team
- United States Army Maneuver Center of Excellence Command Exhibition Parachute Team
- United States Special Operations Command Parachute Team
- "Blood on the Risers"
- United States Army Reconnaissance and Surveillance Leaders Course
