= Cleveland National Air Show =

Annual air show in Ohio, U.S.

- Dates: Saturday–Monday of Labor Day weekend
- Begins: Saturday of Labor Day weekend
- Frequency: Annual
- Venue: Burke Lakefront Airport
- Locations: Cleveland, Ohio, United States
- Coordinates: 41°31′03″N 81°41′00″W
- Country: United States
- Years active: 1964–present
- Established: September 5, 1964
- Attendance: Approximately 60,000–100,000
- Major events: Aerobatic demonstrations; Military and civilian aircraft demonstrations; Parachute demonstrations; Aircraft displays and exhibits; Jet truck races
- Organizer: Cleveland National Air Show
- Website: clevelandairshow.com

The Cleveland National Air Show is an annual air show held during Labor Day weekend at Burke Lakefront Airport in Cleveland, Ohio. Established in 1964 as an indirect successor to the National Air Races, the event features aerobatic performances, modern military aircraft, and other aviation demonstrations. The headline performance alternates between the U.S. Navy Blue Angels and U.S. Air Force Thunderbirds each year.

The event typically runs from 9:00 a.m. to approximately 4:30 p.m. EDT, with smaller demonstrations taking place throughout the day before the featured Blue Angels or Thunderbirds performance. Heritage or legacy flights are also featured in some years.

== Performers ==
This section lists aircraft and aerial demonstration teams that have performed at the Cleveland National Air Show in recent years. Only flying acts are included; static displays and other ground attractions are excluded.

=== 2027 ===
- U.S. Air Force Thunderbirds

=== 2026 ===
- U.S. Navy Blue Angels
- U.S. Air Force F-22 Raptor
- C-17 Globemaster
- KC-135 Stratotanker
- KC-46 Pegasus
- C-130 Hercules
- Jim Tobul F4U-4 Corsair
- WWII P-40 Warhawk
- U.S. Army Golden Knights Parachute Team
- U.S. Coast Guard Search and Rescue Demo

=== 2025 ===
- U.S. Air Force Thunderbirds
- U.S. Navy F/A-18 Super Hornet
- U.S. Air Force F-15 Eagle
- U.S. Army Golden Knights Parachute Team
- U.S. Air Force KC-135 Stratotanker
- U.S. Marine CH-53E Super Stallion
- C-130 Hercules
- U.S. Coast Guard HH-65C Dolphin Search And Rescue Demonstration
- Kirby Chambliss, Aaaron Fitzgerald, Red Bull Air Force Skydiving Team
- Gregory Colyer
- Hot Streak II Jet Truck
- Howard DGA-6 “Mister Mulligan”

=== 2024 ===
A condensation cloud forms around a Blue Angels jet in 2024

- U.S. Navy Blue Angels
- USMC Fat Albert (C-130 Hercules)
- U.S. Air Force F-15 Eagle
- U.S. Army Golden Knights Parachute Team
- A-10C Thunderbolt II
- Northern Stars Aeroteam
- Hot Streak II Jet Truck
- C-130 Hercules

=== 2023 ===
- U.S. Air Force Thunderbirds
- U.S. Air Force F-22 Raptor
- U.S. Air Force F-15 Eagle
- U.S. Army Golden Knights Parachute Team
- U.S. Marine Corps AV-8B Harrier
- U.S. Navy F/A-18 Super Hornet
- U.S. Air Force KC-135 Stratotanker
- Hot Streak Jet Truck
- C-130 Hercules

=== 2022 ===
A B-25 Mitchell warbird at the 2022 air show

- U.S. Navy Blue Angels
- USMC Fat Albert (C-130 Hercules)
- U.S. Air Force F-16 Fighting Falcon
- U.S. Air Force F-15 Eagle
- U.S. Army Golden Knights Parachute Team
- Randy Ball MiG-17F
- Hot Streak Jet Truck
- WWII B-25 Georgie’s Gal

=== 2021 ===
A Douglas C-47 Skytrain flying in 2021

- U.S. Air Force Thunderbirds
- A-10C Thunderbolt II
- Shockwave jet truck
- U.S. Army Golden Knights Parachute Team
- C-130 Hercules

=== 2020 ===
The 2020 Air Show was canceled due to the COVID-19 pandemic.

=== 2019 ===
The Shockwave jet truck in 2019

- U.S. Air Force Thunderbirds
- U.S. Air Force F-35 Lightning II
- A-10C Thunderbolt II
- Shockwave Jet Truck
- U.S. Army Golden Knights Parachute Team
- C-130 Hercules
- Lucas Oil Airshows
- GEICO Skytypers

=== 2018 ===
A wing walker at the 2018 air show

- U.S. Navy Blue Angels
- USMC Fat Albert (C-130 Hercules)
- U.S. Air Force F-16 Viper Jet
- C-130 Hercules
- Shockwave Jet Truck]
- Sean Tucker
- Tiger Yak 55

=== 2017 ===
The Thunderbirds performing in 2017

- U.S. Air Force Thunderbirds
- U.S. Navy Super Hornet
- U.S. Air Force A-10
- Shockwave Jet Truck
- Ohio Air National Guard C-130
- Nakajima B5N
- Havilland D.H. 115 Vampire Jet
- Vought F4U Corsair

=== 2016 ===
A Blue Angels F/A-18 flies past Key Tower in 2016

- U.S. Navy Blue Angels
- USMC Fat Albert (C-130 Hercules)
- U.S. Air Force F-35 Lightning II
- U.S. Air Force F-22 Raptor
- Shockwave Jet Truck
- North American P-51 Mustang
- North American B-25 Mitchell

=== 2015 ===
- U.S. Air Force Thunderbirds
- Boeing F/A-18E Super Hornet
- C-130 Hercules
- C-17 Globemaster
- Sean Tucker
- North American P-51 Mustang
- North American B-25 Mitchell

=== 2014 ===
Tinstix of Dynamite performing at the 2014 air show

- U.S. Navy Blue Angels
- C-130 Fat Albert
- Unmanned Aircraft Systems Demonstration
- NASA Glenn
- Northern Ohio Unmanned Aircraft Systems Association (NOUASA)
- Art Nalls' Sea Harrier and L-39 Black Jet

=== 2013 ===
The 2013 Cleveland National Air Show was canceled due to the federal sequester.

=== 2012 ===
- U.S. Navy Blue Angels
- USMC Fat Albert (C-130 Hercules)
- U.S. Army Golden Knights Parachute Team
- F/A-18F Super Hornet
- Sky Soldiers Cobra Helicopter Demonstration Team (AH-1 Cobra)
- Sean Tucker (Oracle Challenger II)
- Mike Goulian Aerosports
- Jane Wicker
- Shockwave Jet Truck
- Aurora Stearman
- B-17 Flying Fortress Yankee Lady
- Jim Leavelle (T-6 Texan)
- Metro Life Flight (Eurocopter EC-145)
- US Air Force Heritage Flight (F-22 Raptor and P-51)

=== 2011 ===
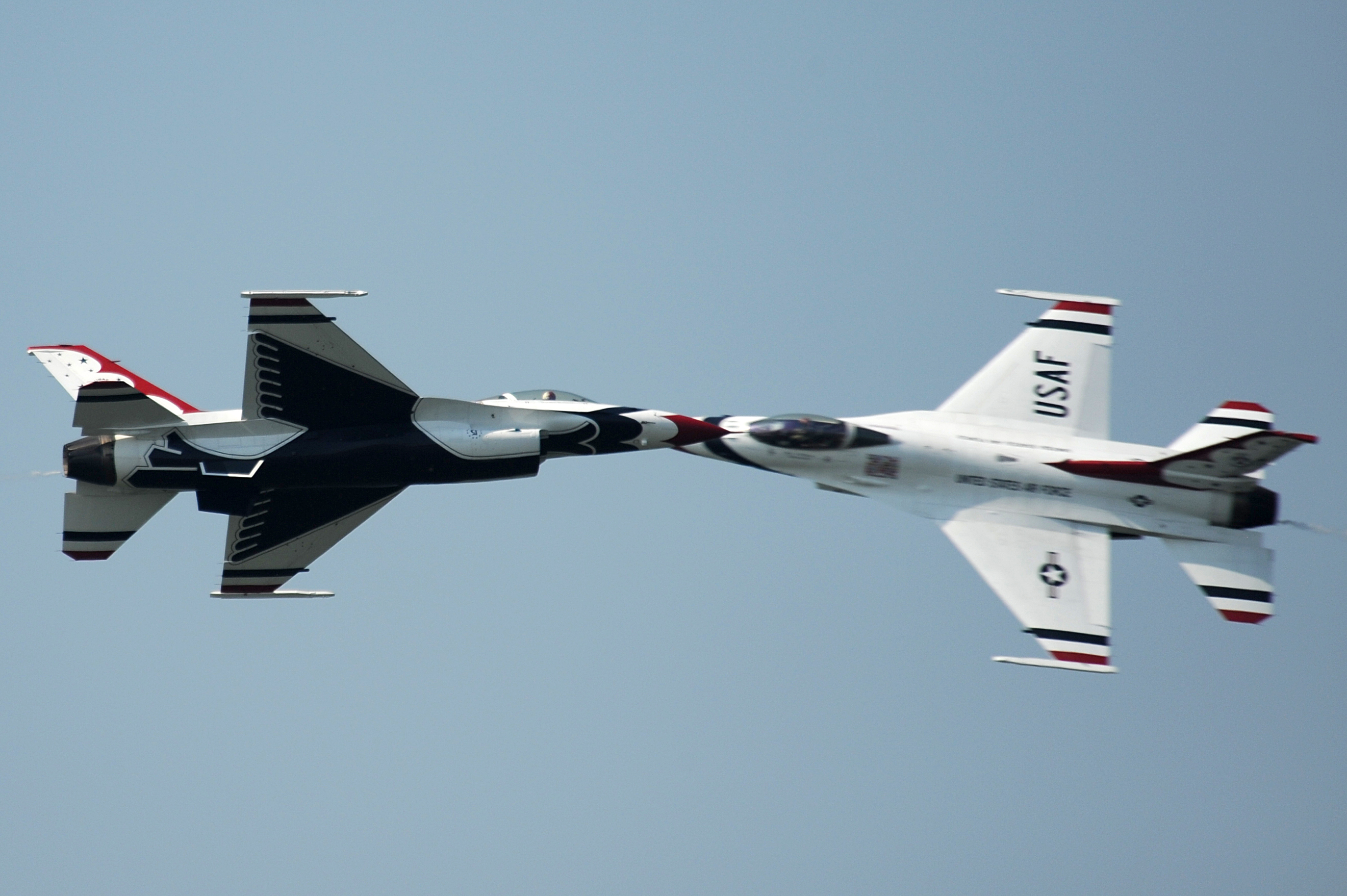
The United States Air Force Thunderbirds performed at the 2011 air show.

- U.S. Air Force Thunderbirds
- U.S. Army Golden Knights Parachute Team
- A-10 Thunderbolt II
- F/A-18 Hornet
- F-4 Phantom II
- P-51 Mustang
- CP-140 Aurora
- Jason Newburg- Viper Airshows
- USAF Heritage Flight
- Jacquie B Airshows
- Kent Pietsch Jelly Belly
- Jim "Fang" Maroney
- School Time Jet Bus
- John Klatt (Staudacher S-300D)
- B-17 Flying Fortress Memphis Belle
- Metro Life Flight Eurocopter EC-145

=== 2010 ===
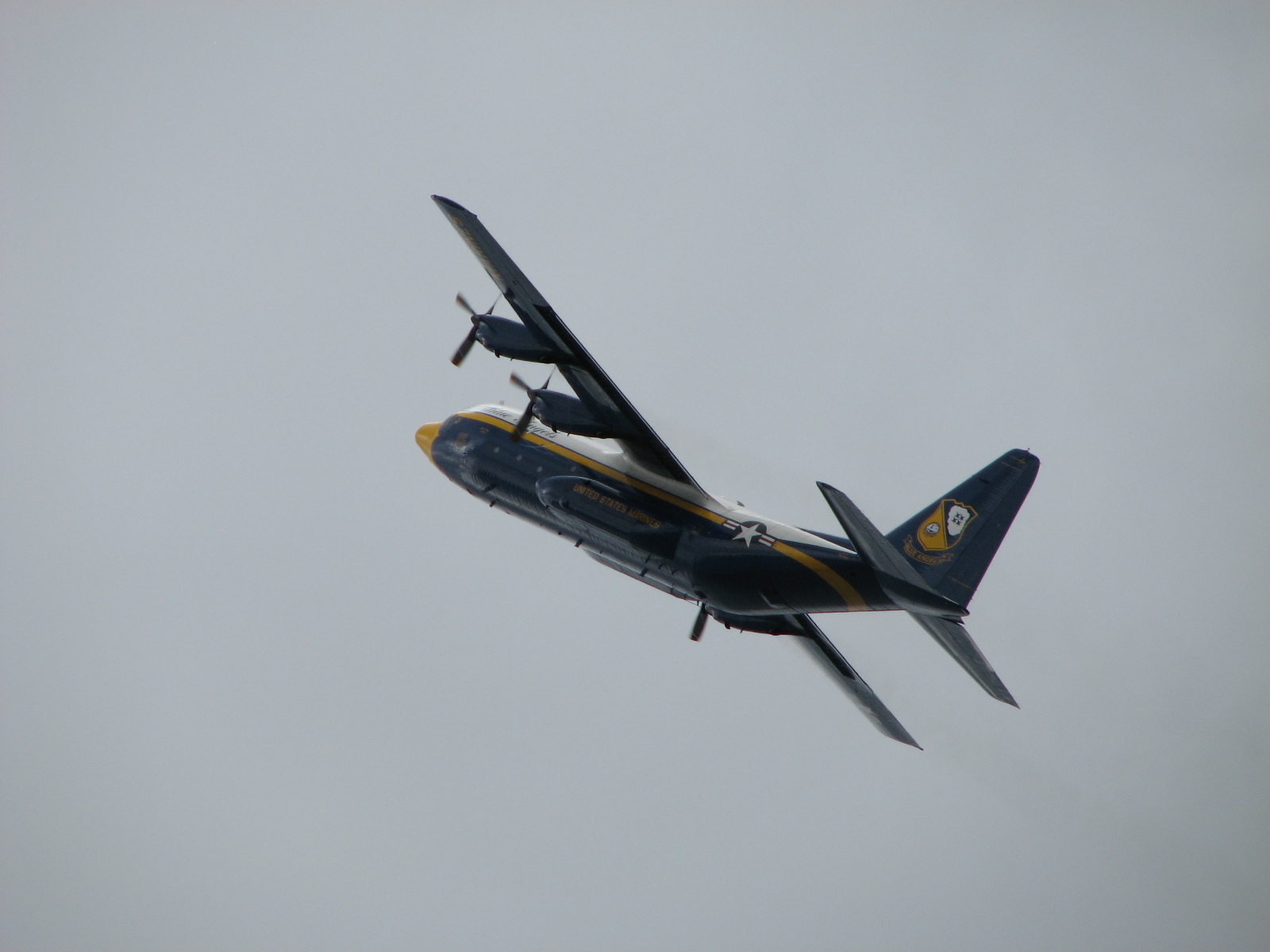
The Blue Angels' support plane is a Lockheed C-130 Hercules transport, nicknamed Fat Albert.

- U.S. Navy Blue Angels
- USMC Fat Albert (C-130 Hercules)
- U.S. Army Golden Knights Parachute Team
- F/A-18F Super Hornet
- U.S. Navy Legacy Flight
- F-15E Strike Eagle
- Red Eagle Air Sports (Pitts Special)
- Gene Soucy (Grumman Ag Cat)
- Teresa Stokes Wingwalking
- B-17 Flying Fortress Yankee Lady
- Mitsubishi A6M Zero TORA 101
- Shockwave Jet Truck
- Mad Bomber Pyrotechnics and Wall of Fire
- Metro Life Flight Eurocopter EC-145
- TS-11 Iskra

=== 2009 ===
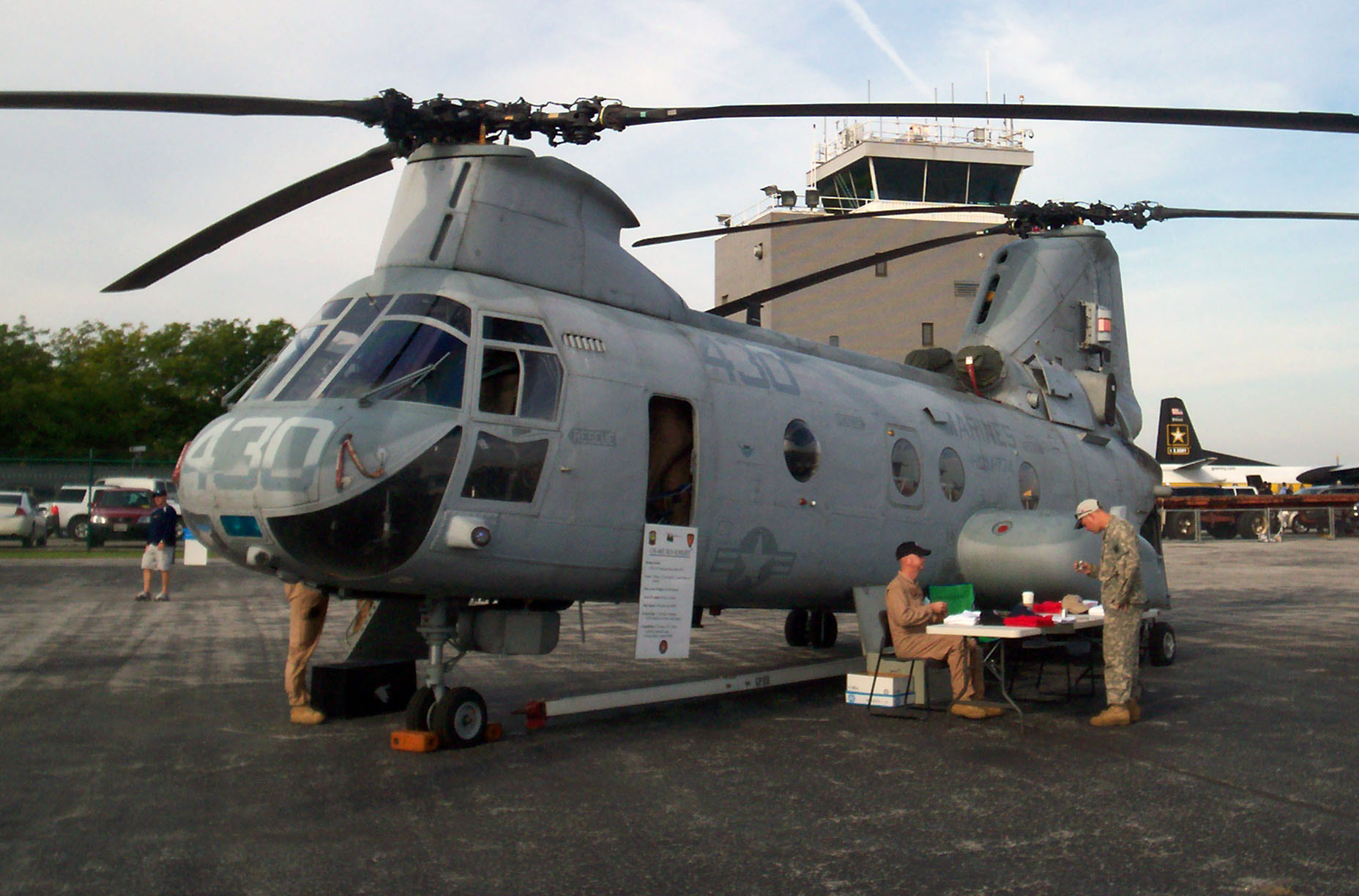
A CH-46 Sea Knight at the 2009 air show

- U.S. Air Force Thunderbirds
- AV-8B Harrier II
- F-15E Strike Eagle
- A-10 Thunderbolt II
- USCG HH-65C Dolphin
- C-130 Hercules
- KC-135 Stratotanker
- Skip Stewart (Pitts S2S)
- Franklin's Flying Circus (Waco UPF-7)
- John Klatt (Staudacher S-300D)
- AH-64 Apache
- B-17 Flying Fortress Memphis Belle
- TS-11 Iskra
- U.S. Army Golden Knights Parachute Team
- Cleveland Aeromodeling Society
- USAF Heritage Flight
- Metro Life Flight Eurocopter EC-145
- Shockwave Jet Truck

=== 2008 ===
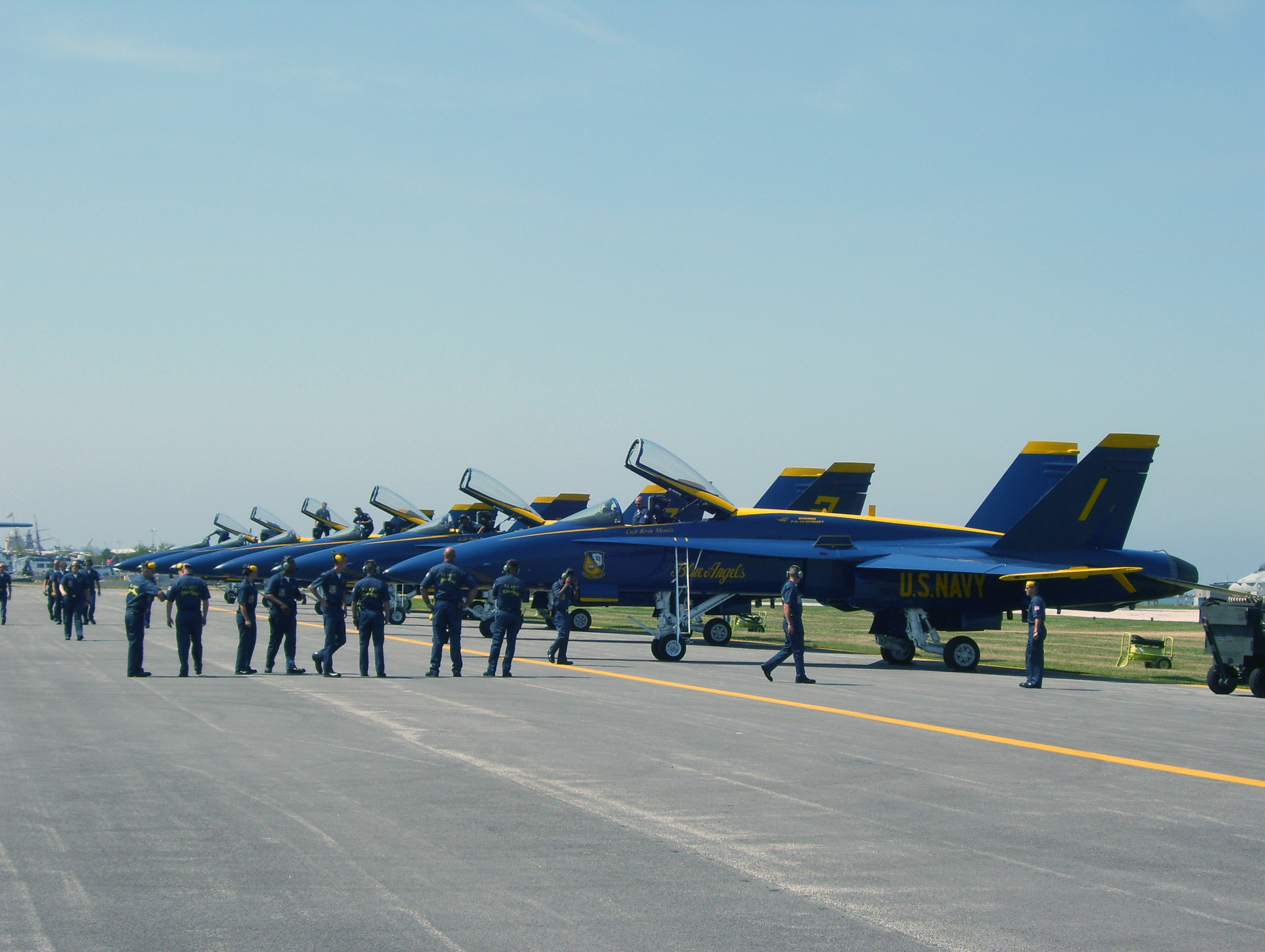
The U.S. Navy's Blue Angels appeared at the 2008 air show

- U.S. Navy Blue Angels
- F/A-18F Super Hornet
- F-15C Eagle
- F-16C Fighting Falcon
- C-130 Hercules
- Red Star and Dragon
- B-17 Flying Fortress Yankee Lady
- John Mohr Barnstorming (Stearman PT-17)
- Silent Wings (Alisport Silent-J)
- Nikolay Timofeev (Sukhoi Su-26)
- Sean Tucker (Oracle Challenger II)
- TS-11 Iskra
- Cleveland Aeromodeling Society
- U.S. Army Golden Knights Parachute Team
- USN Legacy Flight
- USAF Heritage Flight
- Metro Life Flight Sikorsky S-76
- Shockwave Jet Truck

=== 2007 ===
- U.S. Air Force Thunderbirds
- F/A-18F Super Hornet
- F-15E Strike Eagle
- C-17 Globemaster III
- F-86 Sabre
- C-130 Hercules
- Julie Clark T-34 Mentor
- John Klatt (Staudacher S-300D)
- Sean Tucker (Oracle Challenger II)
- TS-11 Iskra
- USAF Heritage Flight
- Shockwave Jet truck
- Metro Life Flight Sikorsky S-76

=== 2006 ===
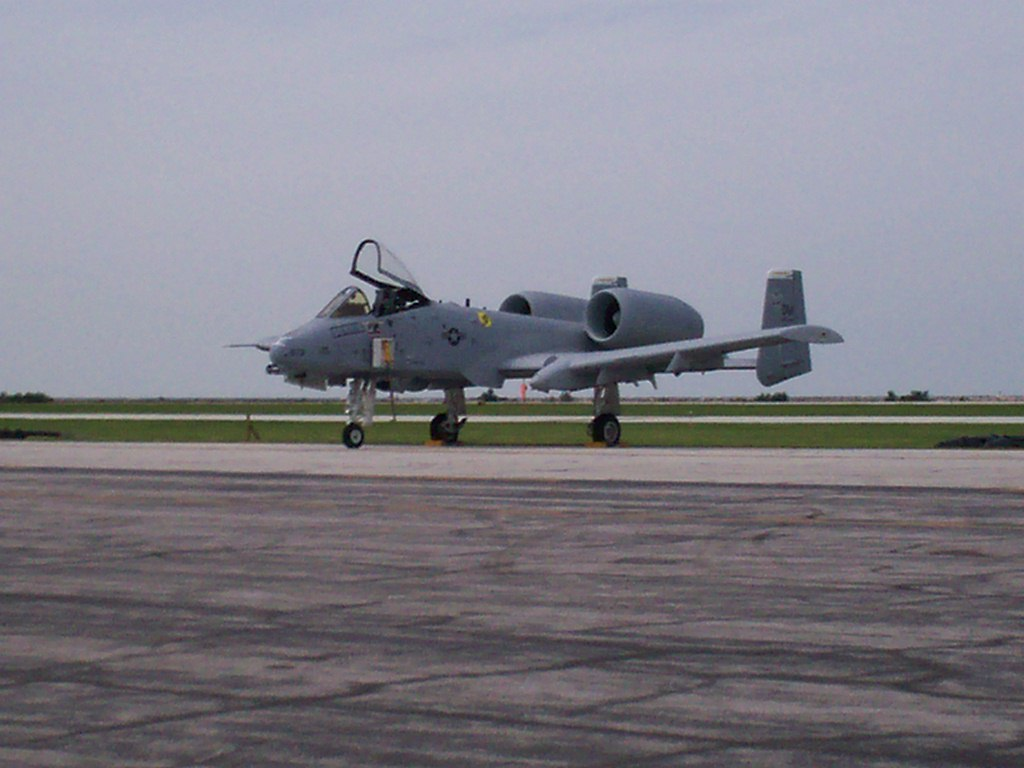
This A-10 appeared at the 2006 air show.

- U.S. Navy Blue Angels
- A-10 Thunderbolt II
- F-22 Raptor
- B-1 Lancer
- F-117 Nighthawk
- USAF Heritage Flight
- C-130 Hercules
- U.S. Army Golden Knights Parachute Team
- The Red Knight (T-33 Shooting Star)
- TS-11 Iskra
- Shockwave Jet Truck
- Greg Poe (Ethanoledge 540)
- Walt Pierce
- B-25 Mitchell Panchito
- Supermarine Spitfire
- F4U Corsair
- Metro Life Flight Sikorsky S-76
- Cleveland Aeromodeling Society

=== 2005 ===
- U.S. Air Force Thunderbirds
- A-10 Thunderbolt II
- B-1 Lancer
- USAF Heritage Flight
- F/A-18F Super Hornet
- USN Legacy Flight
- C-130 Hercules
- US Army Golden Knights
- Sean Tucker (Pitts SpecialI)
- Matt Chapman (Lycoming CAP 580)
- Michael Mancuso (Extra 300)
- Shockwave Jet Truck
- B-17 Flying Fortress "Yankee Lady"
- B-25 Mitchell "Yankee Warrior"
- C-47 Skytrain "Yankee Doodle Dandy"
- Metro Life Flight Sikorsky S-76
- Cleveland Aeromodeling Society
- Sky Busters Rocketry Club

=== 2004 ===
- F-16 Fighting Falcon
- F/A-18 Hornet
- USAF Heritage Flight
- USN Legacy Flight
- P-51 Mustang
- F4U Corsair
- B-1 Lancer
- C-17 Globemaster III
- C-130 Hercules
- US Army Golden Knights
- B-25 Mitchell "Panchito"
- B-17 Flying Fortress "Memphis Belle"
- Shockwave Jet truck
- Jim Leroy (Pitts S2S)
- US Jet Aerobatic Team
- Jimmy Franklin (Waco biplane)
- Steve Coan (Windex 1200)
- Kyle Franklin Jet Wingwalking
- Metro Life Flight Sikorsky S-76
- Cleveland Aeromodeling Society
- Sky Busters Rocketry Club

=== 2003 ===
- U.S. Navy Blue Angels
- US Army Golden Knights
- F-16 Fighting Falcon
- F-14 Tomcat
- Firebirds Delta Team
- Debbie Gary (SF 260 Marchetti)
- F4U Corsair
- P-51 Mustang
- Hawker Sea Fury
- US Air Force Reserve Jet Cars
- Classic Air Racers
- P-38 Lightning
- P-40 Warhawk
- F6F Hellcat
- Metro Life Flight Sikorsky S-76
- Cleveland Aeromodeling Society

=== 2002 ===
- U.S. Air Force Thunderbirds
- US Army Golden Knights
- A-10 Thunderbolt II
- F-14 Tomcat
- CF-18 Hornet
- AeroShell Aerobatics (T-6 Texan)
- Hispano HA-200
- Learjet 23
- Beech 18
- Sukhoi Su-31
- Shockwave Jet Truck
- Lockheed Constellation
- Martin 404
- Douglas DC-3
- Ford Tri-Motor
- Air Racing
- B-25 Mitchell
- Cleveland Aeromodeling Society

=== 2001 ===
- U.S. Navy Blue Angels
- US Army Golden Knights
- A-10 Thunderbolt II
- CF-18 Hornet
- C-130 Hercules
- B-1 Lancer
- C-17 Globemaster III
- Swift Magic aerobatic team
- F-86 Sabre
- MiG-15
- Aero L-39
- Bob & Pat Wagner (Boeing-Stearman Model 75)
- Jim "Bulldog" Leroy (Pitts S2S)
- Dan Buchanan ("Flying Colors" hang gliding)
- Bee Gee replica
- Walt Linscott
- Ian Groom (Sukhoi Su-31)
- Cleveland Aeromodeling Society

=== 2000 ===
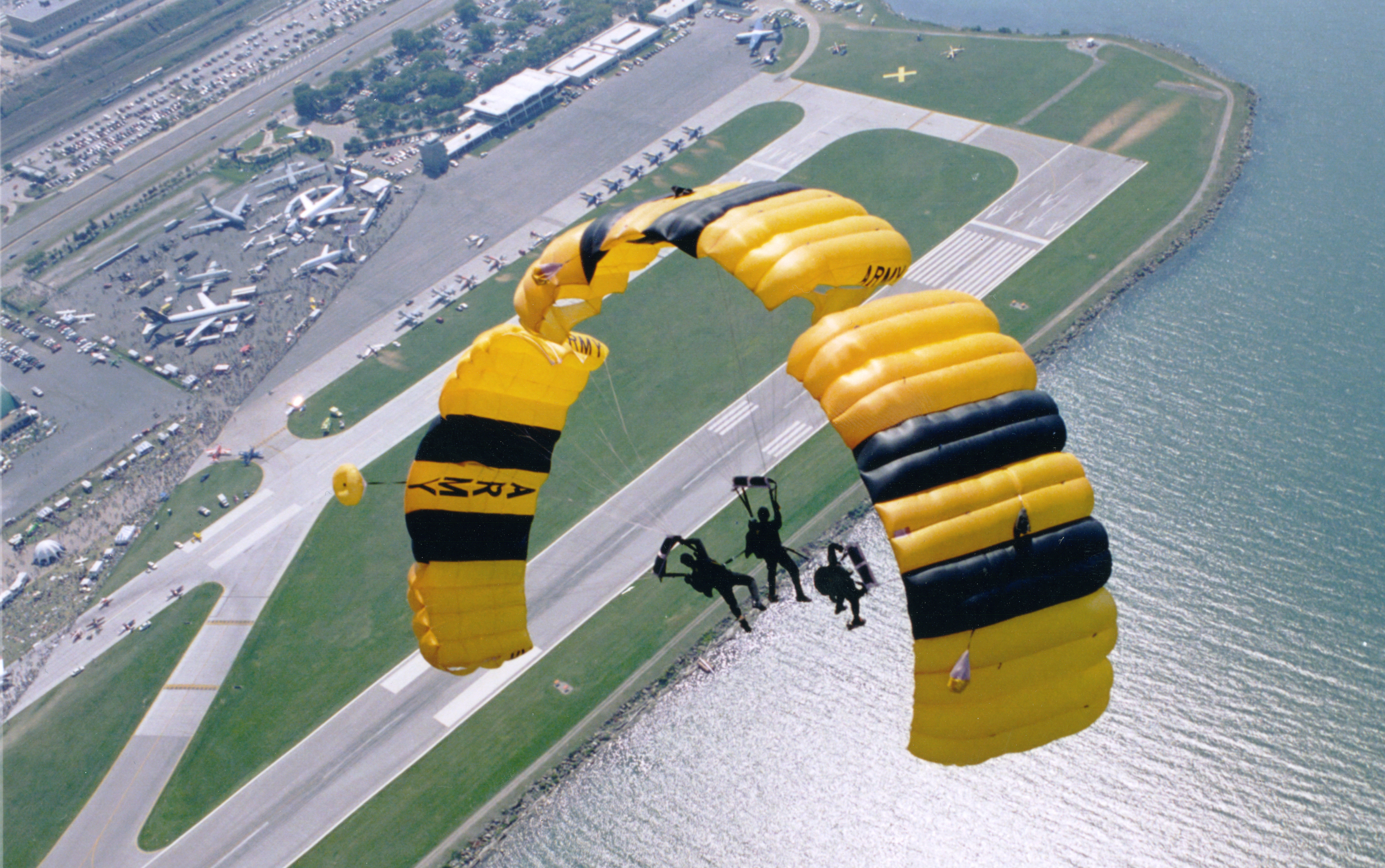
U.S. Army Parachute Team in 2000

- US Air Force Thunderbirds
- CASPA Challenge Series
- F-14 Tomcat
- F-15 Eagle
- F/A-18 Hornet
- RAF Hawker Siddeley Nimrod
- YAK-55
- Greg Poe (Zivko Edge)
- Gene Soucy (Extra 300)
- Sean Tucker (Pitts Special)
- Showcopters (Robinson R22)
- Shockwave Jet truck
- F4U Corsair
- B-29 Superfortress "Fifi"
- B-24 Liberator "Diamond Lil"
- B-25 Mitchell
- B-17 Flying Fortress

=== 1999 ===
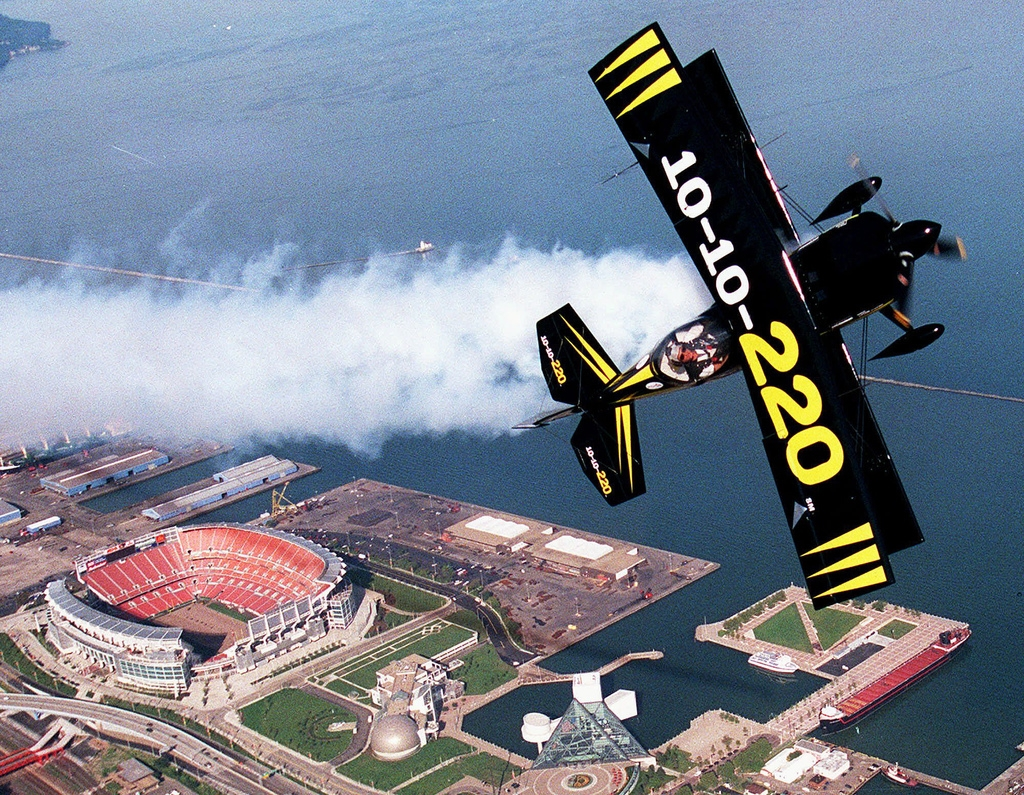
Sean Tucker flies over North Coast Harbor in 1999

- U.S. Navy Blue Angels
- CASPA Challenge Series
- Sean Tucker Pitts Special
- US Army Golden Knights
- F-14 Tomcat
- F-16 Fighting Falcon
- P-51 Mustang
- RAF Hawker Siddeley Nimrod
- SNJ-2
- Kyle Franklin Waco UPF-7
- Walt Linscott YAK-55
- Bob Correll's Kitecycle
- Metro Life Flight Sikorsky S-76

== Accidents and incidents related to air show ==
- September 8, 1981: Departing Cleveland after three successful shows, a T-38 Talon from the United States Air Force Thunderbirds, ingested birds shortly after take off. The Thunderbirds Commander/Leader, Lt Col David "DL" Smith ("Thunderbird 1") and his Crew Chief, SSgt Dwight Roberts, both ejected. However, Lt Col Smith's parachute did not open and he died upon impact with the shoreline. SSgt Roberts survived, and was quickly retrieved from Lake Erie.
- September 6, 2009: A TS-11 Iskra practicing for the air show made a gear up landing. The pilot was unharmed and the aircraft received only light damage to the cowling and left wing.
