= United States Army Parachute Team =

Demonstration and competition parachute team

U.S. Army Parachute Team
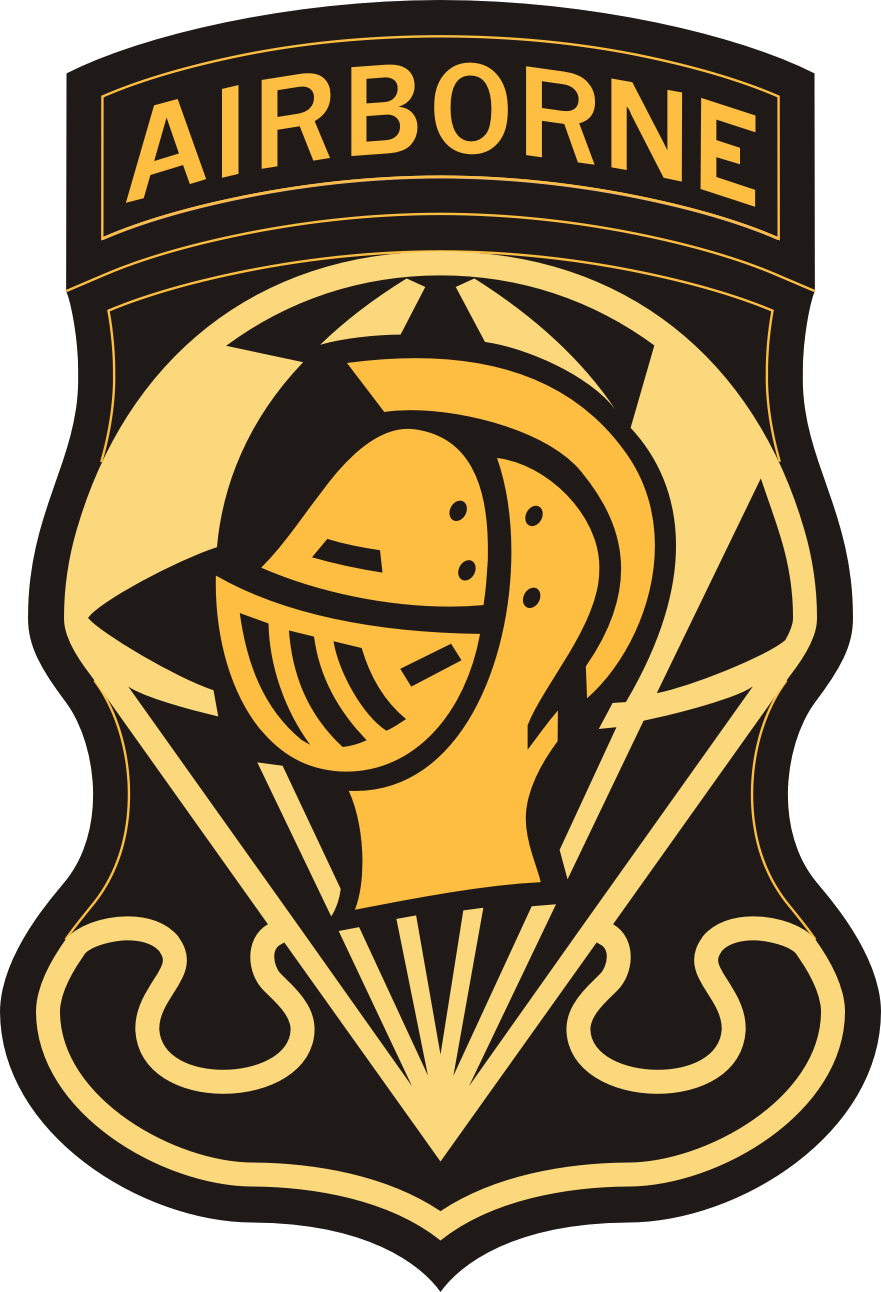
- U.S. Army Parachute Team's shoulder sleeve insignia
- Active: 1959–present
- Country: United States
- Branch: United States Army
- Type: Parachute demonstration and competition
- Role: Public relations and recruiting
- Part of: Marketing and Engagement Brigade, U.S. Army Recruiting Command
- Garrison/HQ: Fort Bragg
- Nickname: Golden Knights
- Color of berets: Maroon
- Decorations: Superior Unit Award
- Website: Official website

Insignia
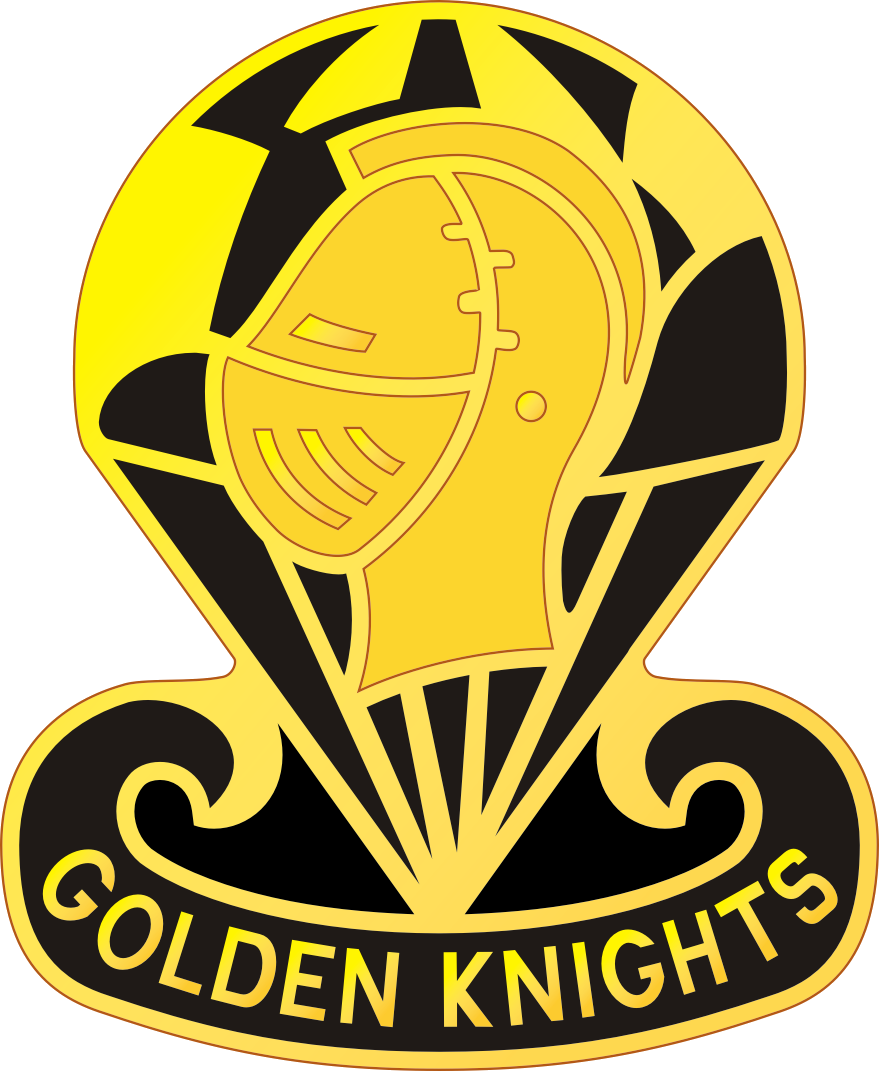
- Distinctive unit insignia

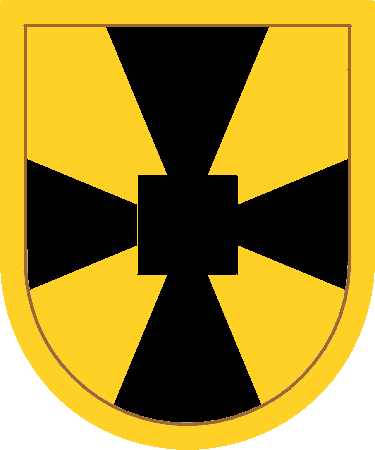
- Unit beret flash

Aircraft flown
- Transport: Fokker C-31A; UV-18C Twin Otter; De Havilland Canada Dash 8 Air Command Commander C-147A

The United States Army Parachute Team, nicknamed the Golden Knights, is a demonstration and competition parachute team of the United States Army. It consists of demonstration and competition parachutist teams, drawn from all branches of the U.S. Army. Members must demonstrate excellence in parachuting.

== History ==
U.S. Army Parachute Team, circa 1962

The Strategic Army Command Parachute Team (STRAC) was originally conceived by Brigadier General Joseph Stilwell in 1959. The first STRAC team consisted of 19 military parachutists. This unofficial unit competed successfully in parachute competitions, provided assistance to the military in the development of modern parachuting techniques and equipment, and provided support for U.S. Army public relations and recruiting. In 1959, the team was formally organized and later redesignated as the U.S. Army's official aerial demonstration unit on 15 June 1961.

== Unit organization ==
The STRAC is part of the United States Army Marketing and Engagement Brigade, headquartered at Fort Knox, Kentucky. The parachute team is garrisoned at Fort Bragg, North Carolina, and has several dedicated facilities in the area. These facilities include an aviation support facility, a team headquarters facility, and a dedicated team drop zone. The team itself is composed of more than 100 men and women and divided into several smaller task-oriented subunits, also called teams or sections. The support elements include an aviation section, a headquarters section, a media-relations section, and a supply section. The team includes two demonstration teams, a four-way relative work team, a style and accuracy team, a tandem section, and most recently, a canopy swoop team.

=== Demonstration teams ===
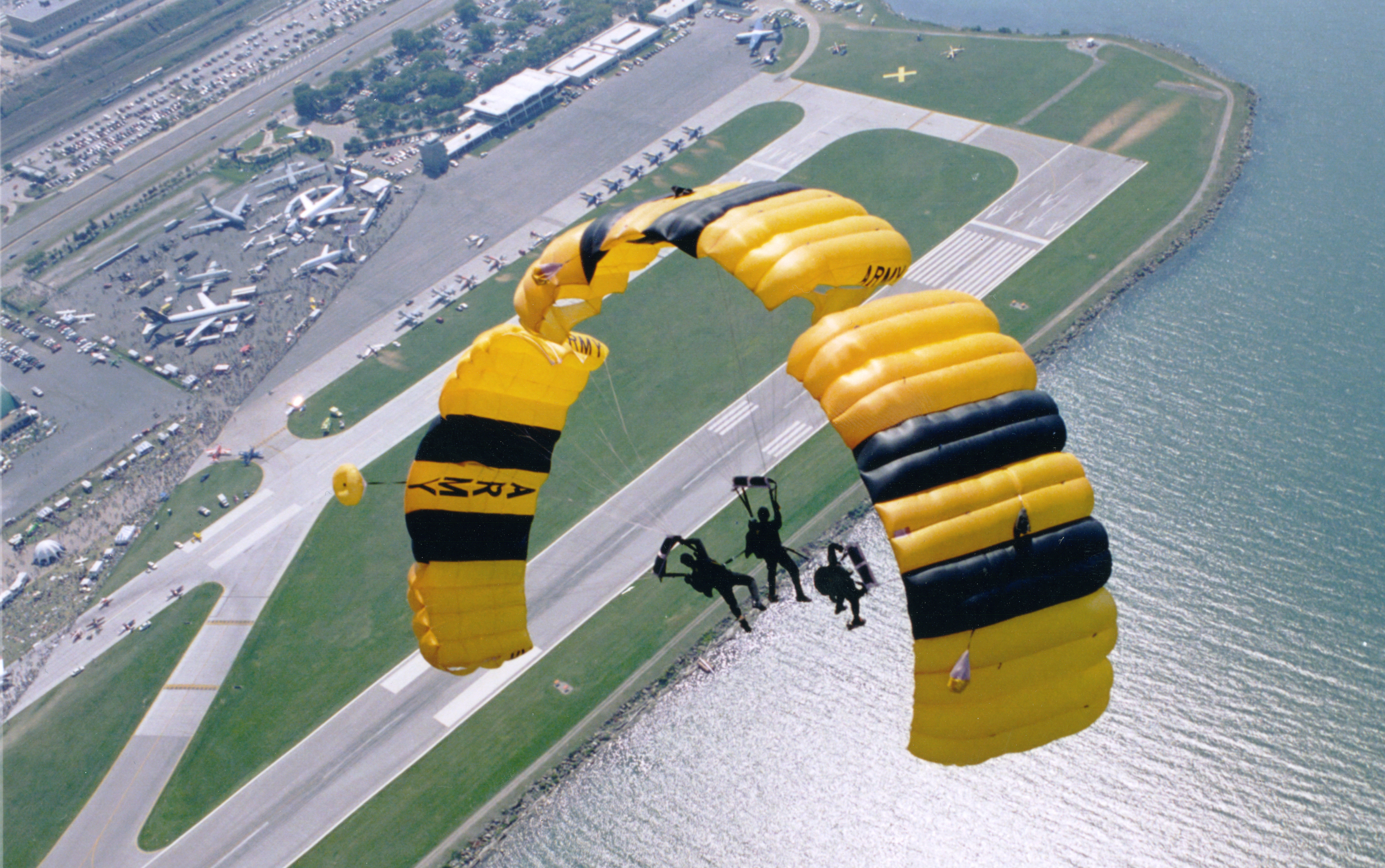
Three Golden Knights descending together at the Cleveland National Air Show

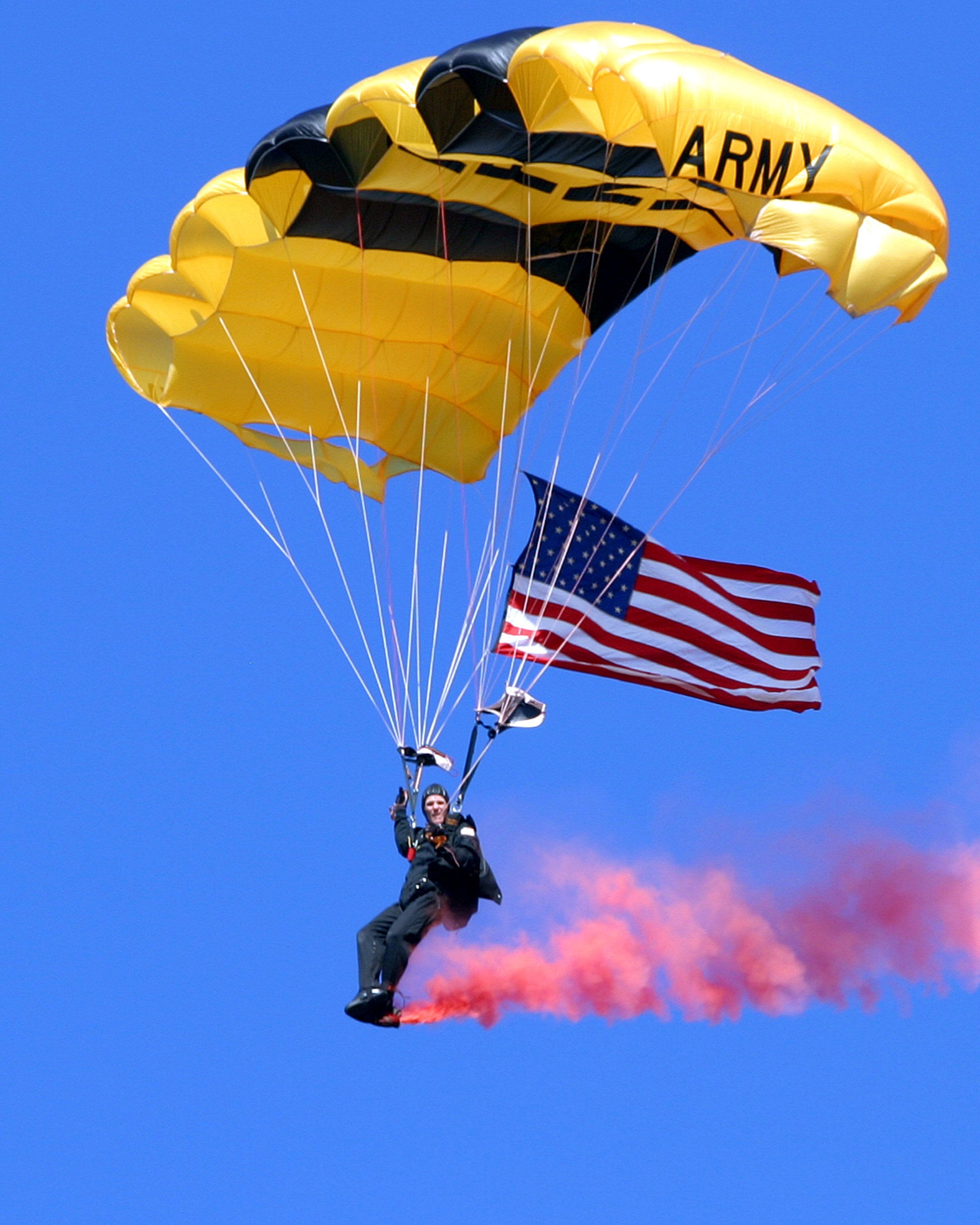
A Golden Knight demonstration parachutist

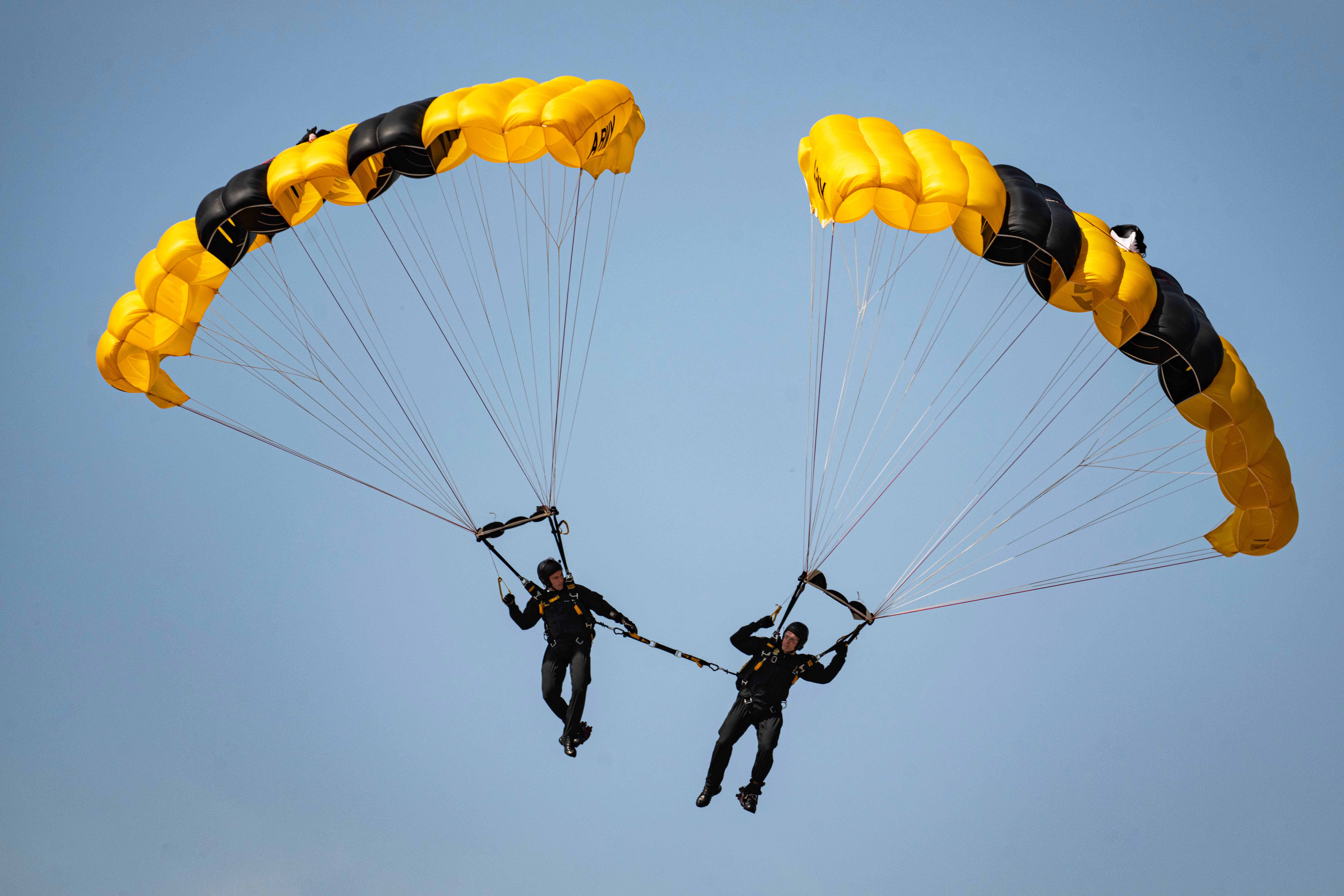
Members of the Golden Knights at the 2025 Defenders of Liberty Air Show at Barksdale AFB

The two Golden Knight demonstration teams travel the United States (and occasionally overseas), performing for public audiences at venues ranging from relatively small civic events to nationally and internationally televised events (such as Monday Night Football games, NASCAR races, and large international airshows). The two, 12-member teams travel around 240 days per year, and use the team's two Fokker C-31A Troopship jump aircraft as their primary means of transportation, and sometimes the UV-18C Twin Otter Series 400 made by Viking.

The two demonstration teams are dubbed the Gold Team and Black Team, in reference to the official U.S. Army colors. Team members come from a variety of backgrounds in one of the 150 jobs available in the U.S. Army. Each team has a team leader, who typically has the most time and experience performing demonstration jumps and typically holds the rank of a U.S. Army sergeant first class.

The 24 demonstrator positions on the team are typically held for at least three consecutive years. At the end of their tenure, soldiers then either rotate back to U.S. Army units or they may request to stay with the team for an additional period in one of several specialty positions. These positions are usually reserved for tandem parachute instructors, videographers, team leaders, and competition parachutists.

The demonstration teams perform several types of shows; each is performed to exacting standards of practice, but can also be tailored to the specific venue. These shows range from jumpers exiting the aircraft and landing in a stadium, to more involved 20- or 30-minute aerial displays. The Mass Exit show consists of multiple jumpers exiting the aircraft and forming a geometric shape, often with smoke canisters employed for additional crowd effect. The 30-minute Full Show consists of several aircraft passes or "jump runs", with each pass consisting of one or more jumpers exiting and then performing somewhat unusual parachuting maneuvers. Once safely on the ground, the jumpers traditionally perform a ground line-up, in which each jumper is introduced and then the team usually presents a team memento to a distinguished selectee from the show audience.

The Golden Knights enjoy an unparalleled safety record averaging one injury for every 1,000 jumps, and the team averages about 18,000 jumps per year.

The Golden Knights hold an annual tryout and selection program by which qualified U.S. Army men and women are invited to attend a 6-week course, while temporarily assigned to the team at Ft. Liberty. During this event, applicants typically make 150–200 freefall parachute jumps.

When they are not jumping, the Golden Knights learn the team's history, memorize over 13 pages of show narration verbatim, and receive public-affairs and public-speaking orientations. At the end of this process, the remaining applicants who are not released from the program are "knighted" during an induction ceremony and are then put on a probationary status for a one-year period. Those soldiers who successfully complete their probationary period are then officially deemed Golden Knights and then serve their remaining three seasons as full-fledged members of the team.

=== Competition teams ===
Two teams participate in national and international parachute competitions, in four-way formation, eight-way formation, style and accuracy, and canopy piloting competitions. They have won an array of medals from national and international competitions each year, and hold the current military world record in both male and female four-way freefall formation and the world record in canopy piloting speed.

=== Tandem team ===
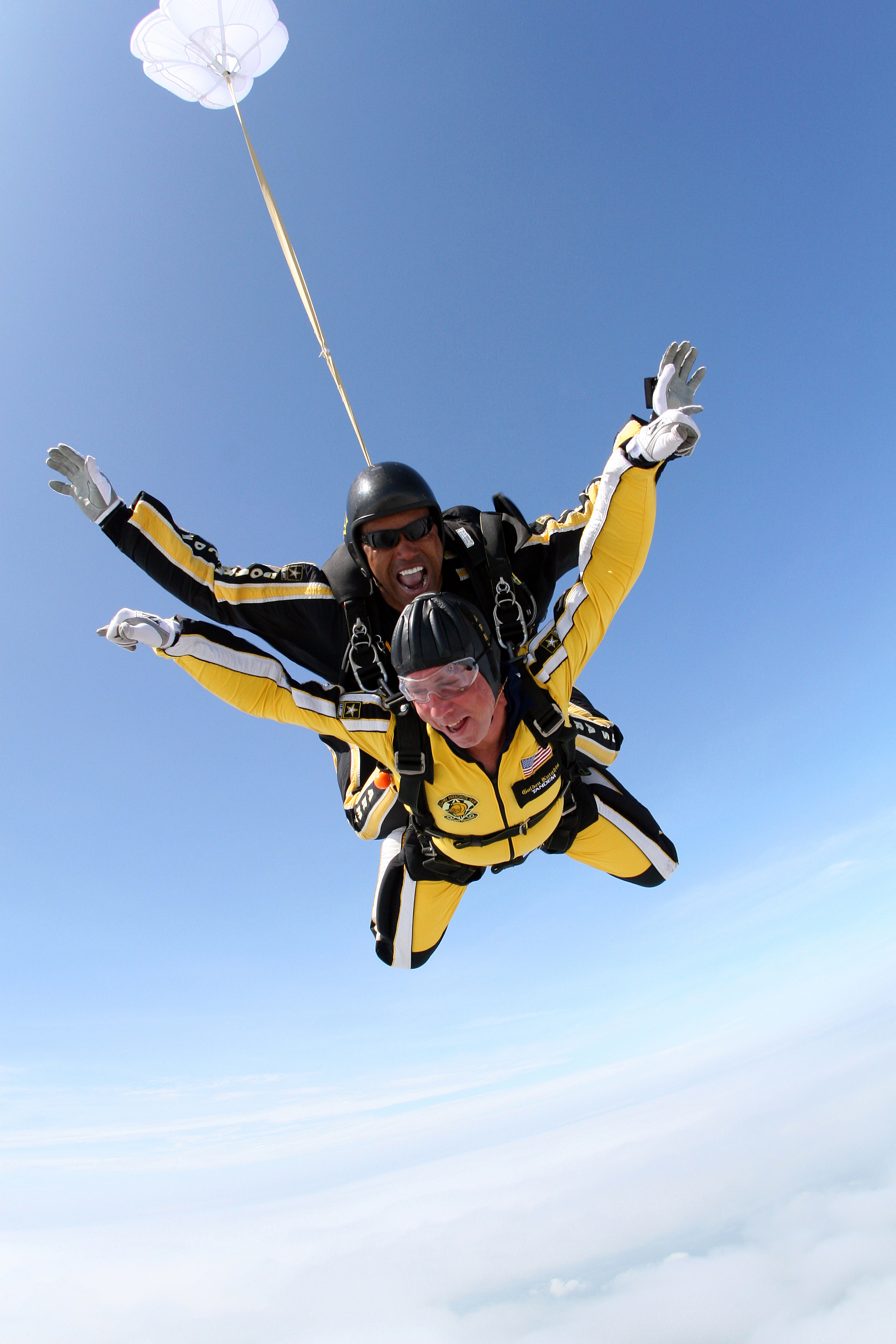
Tandem jump with SFC Michael Elliott (top), a Golden Knight tandem instructor, who was the tandem partner for former President George H. W. Bush during his 2007 and 2014 jumps

The Golden Knights tandem section provides the team with the ability to provide tandem parachute jumps to approved local and national celebrities, media personnel, and VIPs. This allows the team to jump with these celebrities into venues which have local and national flavor, interest, and appeal. This program was designed to allow celebrities and VIPs the opportunity to experience the freefall with the Knights while in a safe, carefully controlled setting and to showcase the skills and qualities of U.S. Army soldiers to these special individuals.

This element consists of six soldiers who were selected from the ranks of the demonstration teams and all are specially trained in tandem parachuting and accelerated freefall parachuting techniques, as well as freefall photography. The Golden Knights have had the honor of jumping with numerous celebrities and heads of state, most notably President George H.W. Bush, in 2007, 2012, and 2014.

=== Headquarters ===
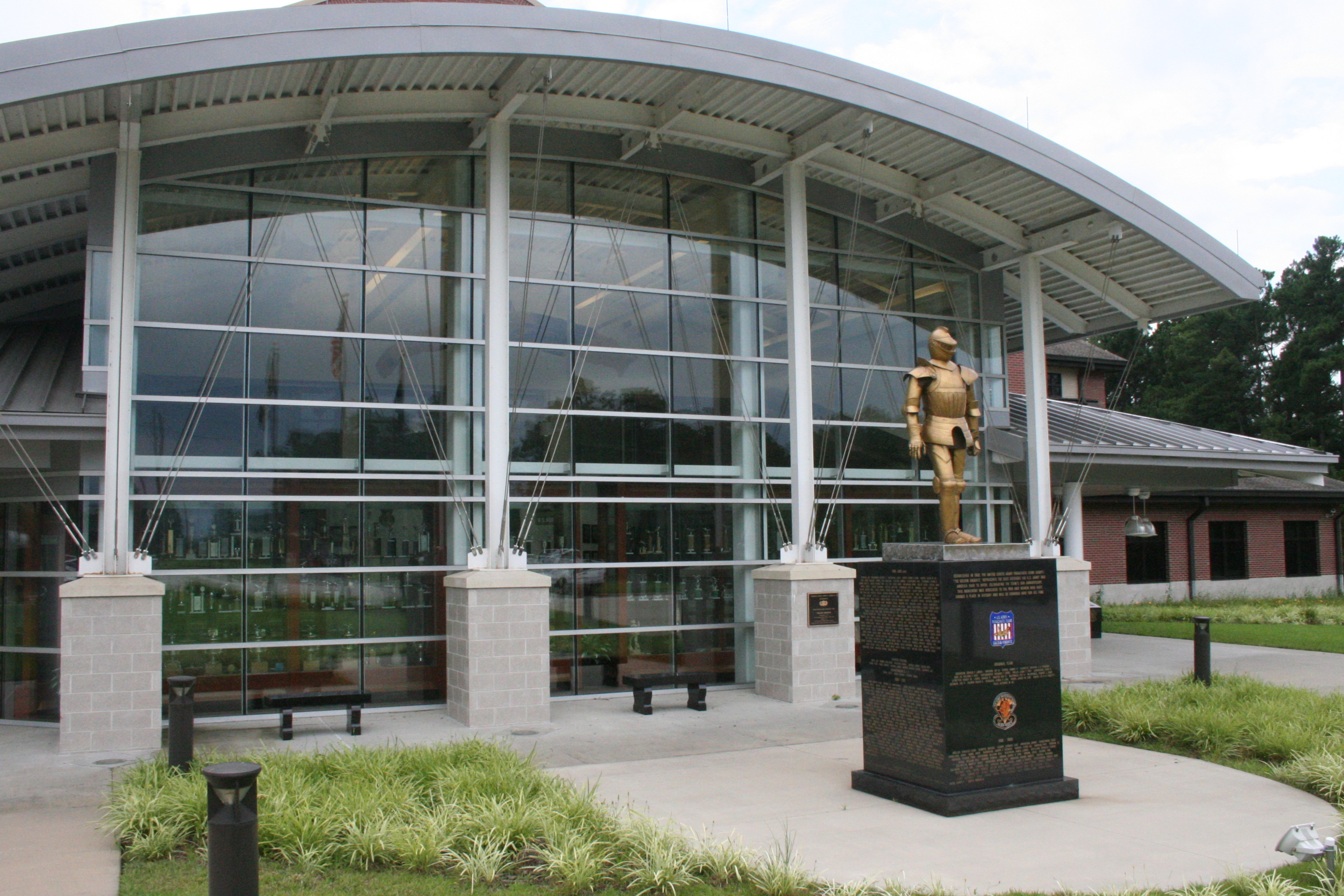
Golden Knights headquarters at Fort Bragg, North Carolina

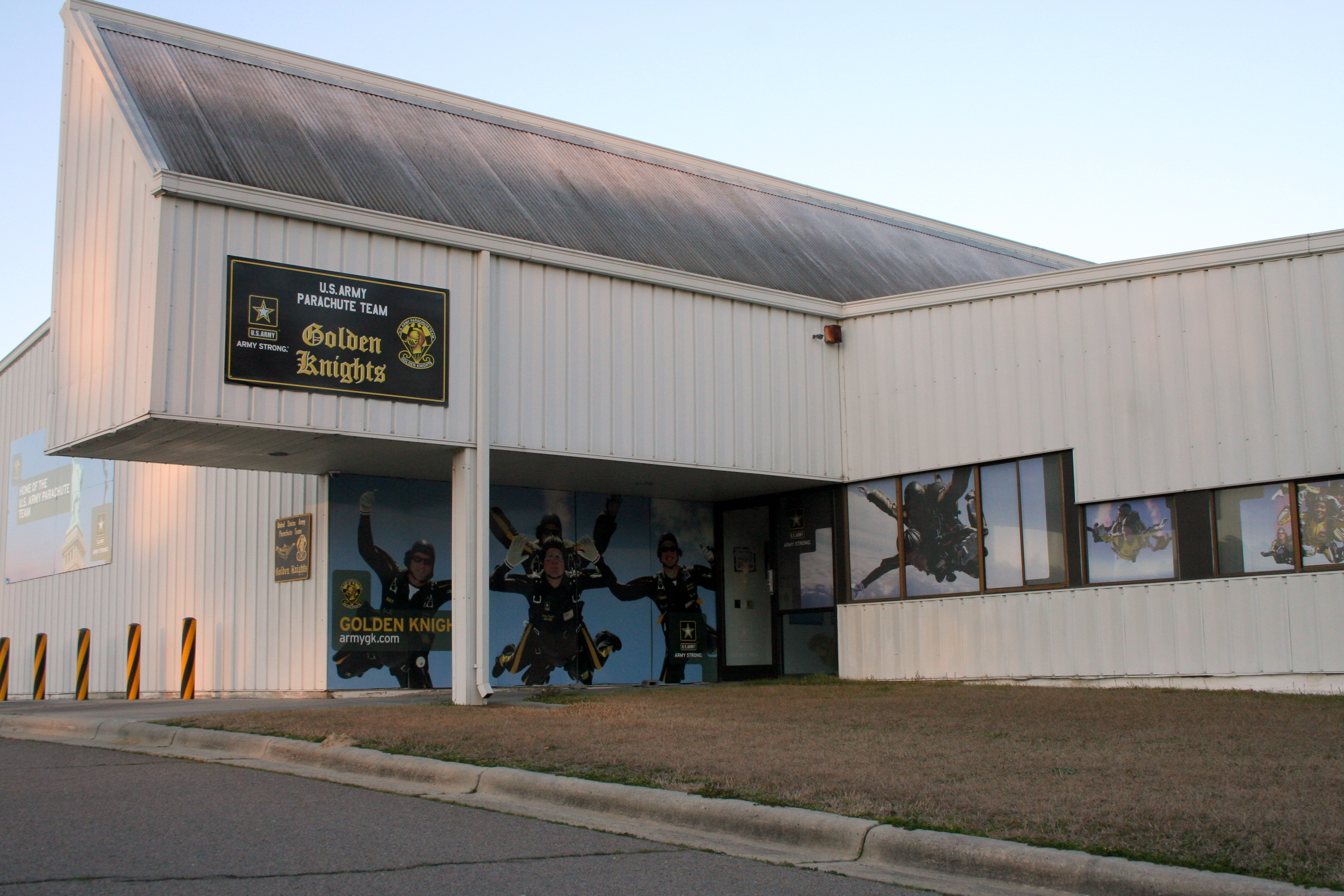
Tandem jump center at Maxton

The Golden Knights headquarters section consists of the team's leadership and administrative, operational planning, safety, and parachute maintenance personnel. The team is commanded by a U.S. Army Lieutenant Colonel (O-5) and run by a U.S. Army Sergeant Major (E-9). Additionally, only four commissioned officers are on the team, which makes it unusual in that it is mostly composed of and run by enlisted personnel. The team performs tandem jumps at the Laurinburg-Maxton Airport in North Carolina.

=== Aviation section ===
The team's aviation section, affectionately known as "Team 6," is commanded by an U.S. Army Major (O4). This section is composed of about 10 U.S. Army and Department of the Army Civilian (DAC) pilots, and six enlisted soldiers. The U.S. Army pilots (with the exception of the Team 6 commander) are all chief warrant officers in the ranks of CW3 to CW4 and most have typically 4,000–5,000 flight hours in fixed-wing aircraft. The enlisted personnel (with the exception of the operations NCO) are all UH-60 Blackhawk helicopter crew chiefs in the ranks of SGT to SFC and most have 500–2,000 flight hours.

=== Team aircraft ===
The Golden Knights use three Viking Air UV-18 Twin Otter Series 400s and two De Havilland Dash 8's designated C-147A as their jump planes. The UV-18s are most frequently used by the tandem and competition teams and for local jumps near Ft. Bragg due to their shorter range. Golden Knights' aircraft have unique livery which is black and white with a gold stripe down the middle, on the fuselage. The tail has the U.S. Army symbol upon it. In 2019, the team retired two Fokker C-31A aircraft it had used for 34 years prior.

== See also ==
- U.S. Army Maneuver Center of Excellence Command Exhibition Parachute Team ("Silver Wings")
- U.S. Special Operations Command Parachute Team ("Para-Commandos")
- U.S. Army Airborne School
- U.S. Military Free-Fall School
- Paratroopers
- Airborne forces
