= Silver Wings (parachute team) =

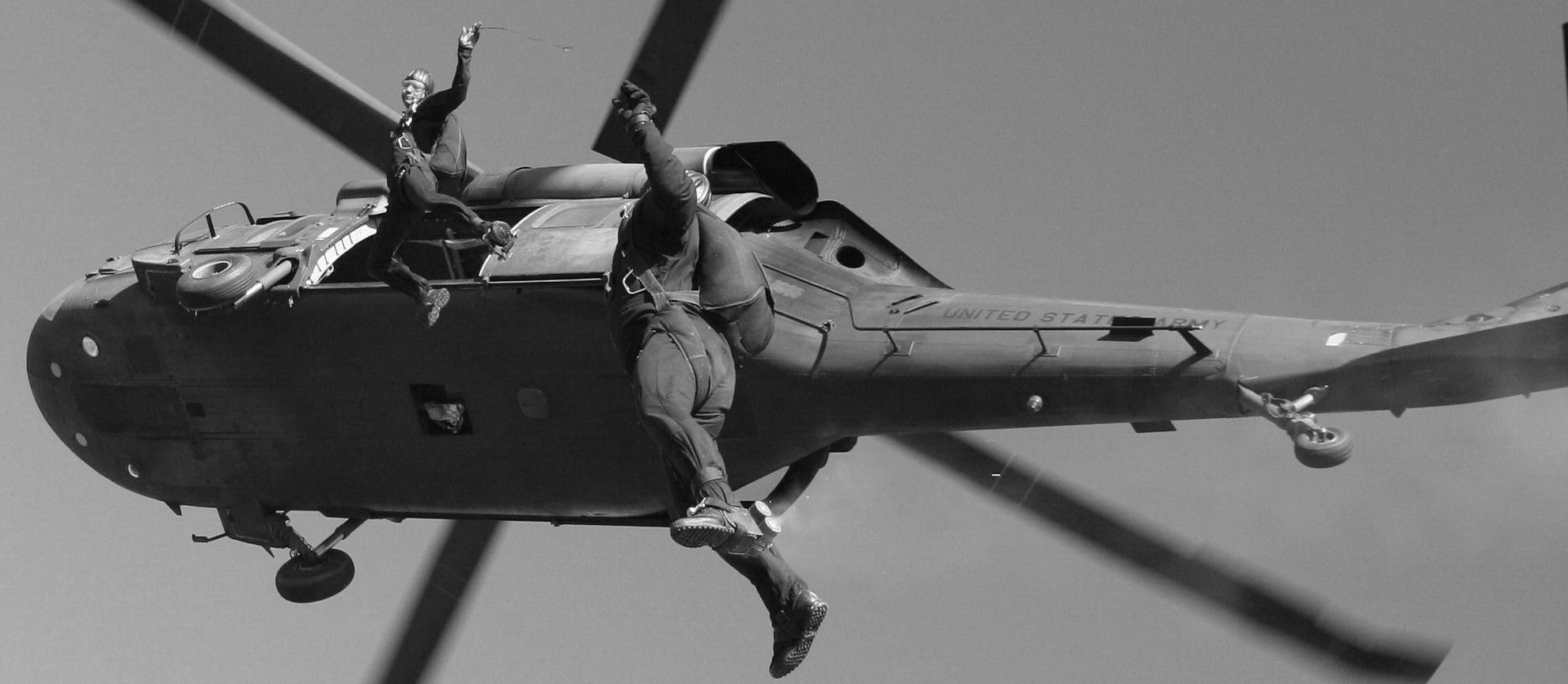
Silver Wings Team Members Exiting a UH-60 Blackhawk

The United States Army Maneuver Center of Excellence Command Exhibition Parachute Team, commonly known as the Silver Wings, is the official demonstration parachute team of Fort Benning, Georgia, United States Army. It is made up of US Army Paratroopers who have demonstrated excellence in parachuting skills, drawn primarily from the 1st Battalion of the 507th Parachute Infantry Regiment, Fort Benning.

== History ==
In 1958 a group of experienced parachutists from 1-507 Parachute Infantry Regiment formed the Fort Benning Sport Parachute Club in order to recreationally hone their free-fall parachuting skills on the weekends. Their efforts to promote the club and talent in the air brought higher-level attention to the club over the following seven years. Renamed the 5000 Jumpers, the club conducted its first official demonstration at the Fort Benning Airfield in 1962. In 1965, the 5000 Jumpers were officially redesignated as the United States Army Command Exhibition Parachute Team, nicknamed the Silver Wings.

== Modern demonstrations ==
=== Composition ===
The Silver Wings mission is to perform live aerial demonstrations in support of the United States Army, and Fort Benning public relations and recruiting. The Silver Wings team is composed of sixteen jumpers, ten of them holding full-time orders to the unit and six serving part-time with the unit. In order to qualify for a position on the team candidates must, at a minimum, hold a novice freefall USPA jump rating, be Basic Airborne qualified, and come from the 1-507 Parachute Infantry Regiment or a unit permanently assigned to Fort Benning. Candidates also must:

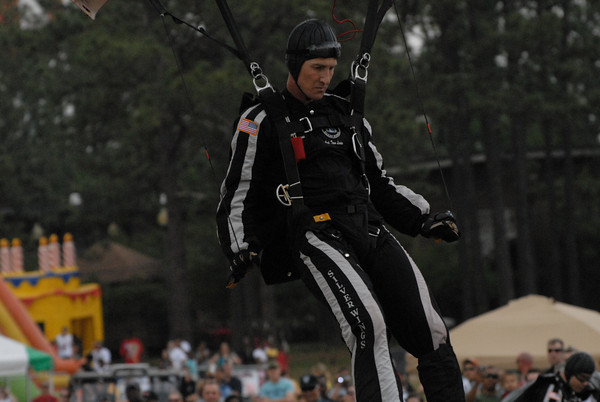
Silver Wings Team Member Landing During a Demonstration

1. Be in the rank of Sergeant to Sergeant First Class (waiverable).
2. Must be /hold an A license or above, unless selected for AFF training.
3. Must have an exit weight of at least 145 pounds.
4. Must possess a good professional attitude and be flexible to change.
5. Must have no UCMJ actions or flags.
6. Must obtain a letter of approval from their Battalion Commander.

Candidates are hand-selected by their chain of command, with approval by their Battalion Commander. All candidates then undergo a demanding 90-day training and assessment phase, during which candidates must master aspects of ground control, to include time warnings, target placement, and radio procedures, rigging smoke, team organizations and equipment storage. Candidates who fail to master these disciplines will not be selected as a member of the Silver Wings.

=== Demonstrations ===
The Silver Wings conduct demonstrations in a variety of locations during almost every weekend of the year. The team has jumped into events such as the Taladega Speedway, Daytona 500, and a number of university- and professional-level sporting events. The team regularly conducts tandem jumps with various celebrities and VIPs. Weekends not spent on demonstrations are filled with additional jumps and drop zone training. The Silver Wings conduct a number of specialty jumps as well, including night and water landing jumps.

== See also ==
- 507th Infantry Regiment
- United States Army Airborne School
- United States Army Pathfinder School
- United States Army Jumpmaster School
- United States Army Parachute Team – Golden Knights
- USSOCOM Parachute Team – Para-Commandos
