= Special Operations Command parachute team =

The USSOCOM emblem

The United States Special Operations Command (USSOCOM) Parachute Team, called the Para-Commandos, is composed of volunteers from the United States Army, Navy, Air Force, Marines and U.S. government civilians who are assigned to Special Operations Command. They are selected for the team after a rigorous training program. They participate with the USSOCOM Parachute Team in addition to their regular duties, with training conducted during off duty time.

The USSOCOM is one of nine unified commands in the United States Armed Forces's combatant command structure. The bulk of the command's 47,000 people are made up of Army Rangers and Special Forces (Green Berets); Navy Sea/Air/Land (SEAL) teams; Air Force combat controllers, pararescuemen and combat crew airmen; United States Marine Corps Forces Special Operators; and Army Civil Affairs and Psychological Operations forces.

== History ==
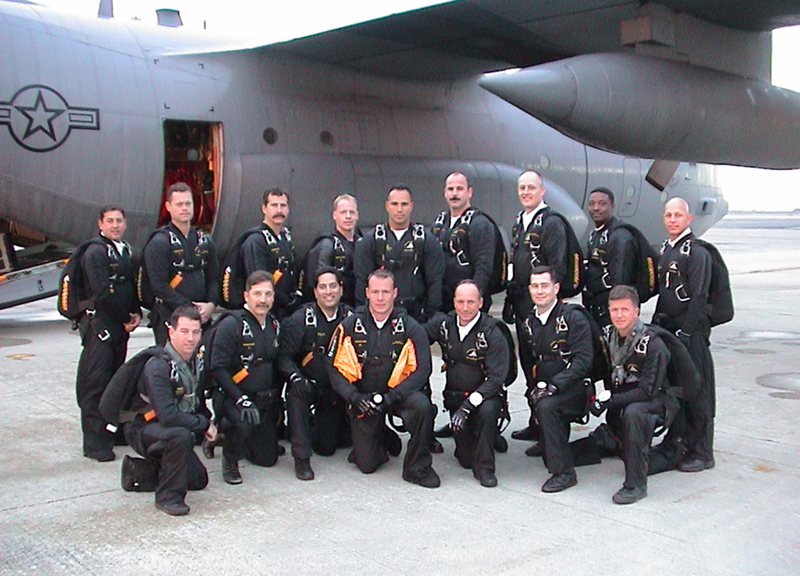
A USSOCOM parachute team.

Formed in 1991, the USSOCOM Parachute Team represents the elite of the United States armed services, its Special Operations Forces (SOF). Team members are trained for a variety of combatant and humanitarian missions. One of the many techniques used for undetected infiltration into enemy zones is the dangerous and difficult military freefall (MFF) operation.

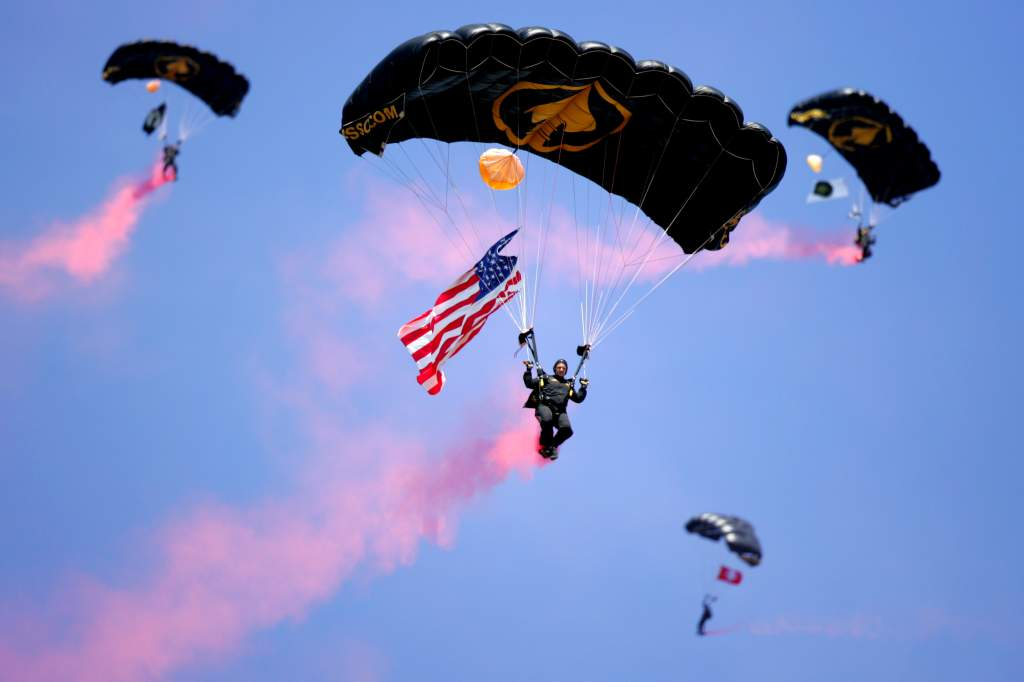
Para-Commandos during a demonstration.

== Techniques ==
The team normally jumps from an altitude of 12,500 feet above ground level, freefalling approximately 2 miles, reaching speeds in excess of 120 miles per hour. This freefall can last up to one minute. During their freefall, the members of the team maneuver their bodies, like the flight surfaces of an aircraft, to form numerous aerial designs and formations in the sky. When the jumpers approach an altitude of 4,000 feet, they will break their formation and glide in different directions. As each team member reaches an altitude of 2,500 feet, they will begin deploying their parachutes. Once open, the members steer their parachutes and perform what is called "stacking." Stacking enables the jumpers to form up in the air as a group and land one behind the other, with precision accuracy.

The USSOCOM Parachute Team modifies the military aspects of MFF operations and provides graphic displays of intricate maneuvers and precision canopy control techniques. Jumps by the team may include carrying a flag or passing a baton while descending in freefall, all while wearing burning smoke canisters attached to their boots to allow viewers to see them better.

== Currently ==
The USSOCOM Parachute Team has appeared at numerous military and civilian airshows, sporting events at all levels (professional, college, high school) and various patriotic, civic and school celebrations throughout the United States. Members of the USSOCOM Parachute Team have established themselves as showmen, traveling ambassadors, and SOF recruiters for the Department of Defense.

== See also ==
- United States Army Parachute Team
