= United States Army Special Forces selection and training =

Army training program

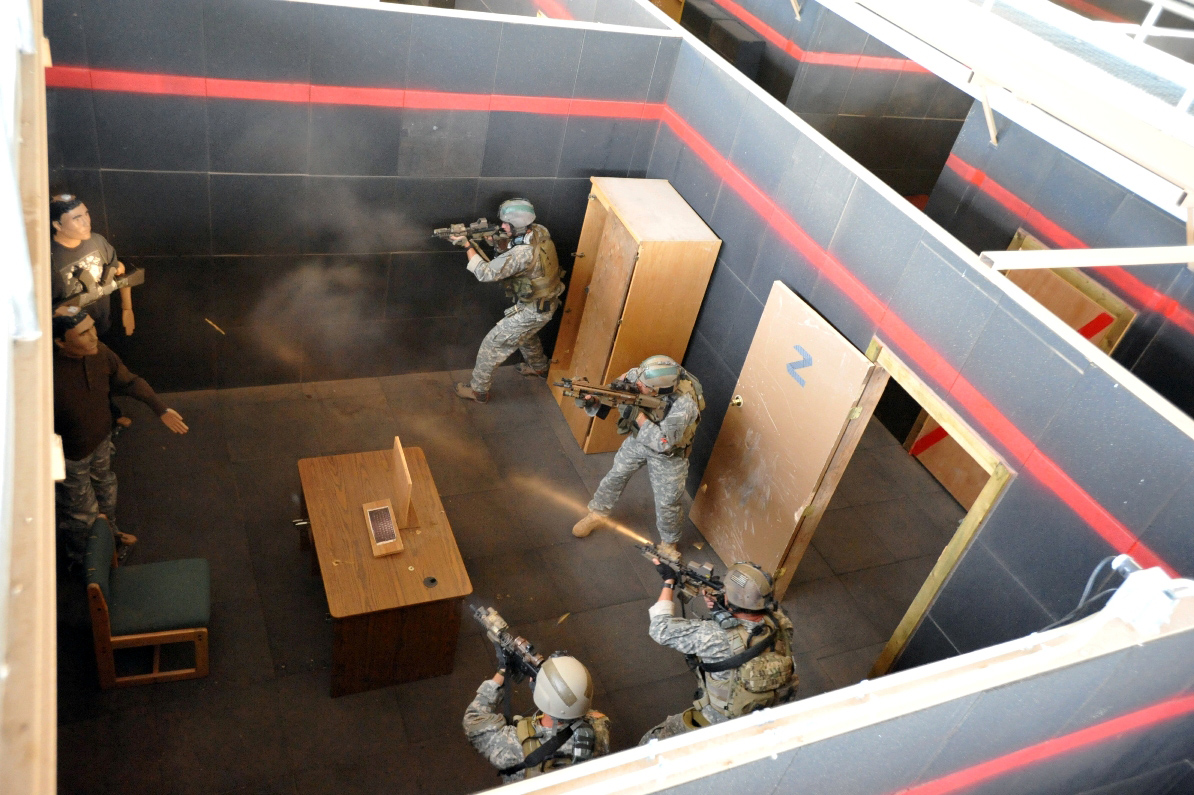
Special Forces soldiers from 3rd Battalion, 10th Special Forces Group (Airborne), conduct shoot-house training at Fort Carson in September 2009.

The Special Forces Qualification Course (SFQC) or, informally, the Q Course is the initial formal training program for entry into the United States Army Special Forces. Phase I of the Q Course is Special Forces Assessment and Selection (SFAS). A candidate who is selected at the conclusion of SFAS will be able to continue to the next of the four phases. If a candidate successfully completes all phases they will graduate as a Special Forces qualified soldier and then, generally, be assigned to a 12-men Operational Detachment "A" (ODA), commonly known as an "A team." The length of the Q Course changes depending on the applicant's primary job field within Special Forces and their assigned foreign language capability but will usually last between 56 and 95 weeks.

== Special Forces Qualification Course ==
=== Special Forces Preparation Course ===
This 6 week performance-oriented course includes physical conditioning, map reading and land navigation instruction; land-navigation practical exercises, and common-task training. The goal is to prepare and condition 18X and REP-63 (National Guard) soldiers to attend Special Forces Assessment and Selection Course and the follow-on Special Forces Qualification Course.

=== Special Forces Assessment and Selection (SFAS) ===
A version of SFAS was introduced as a selection mechanism in the mid-1980s by the Commanding General of the John F. Kennedy Special Warfare Center and School at the time, Brigadier General James Guest.

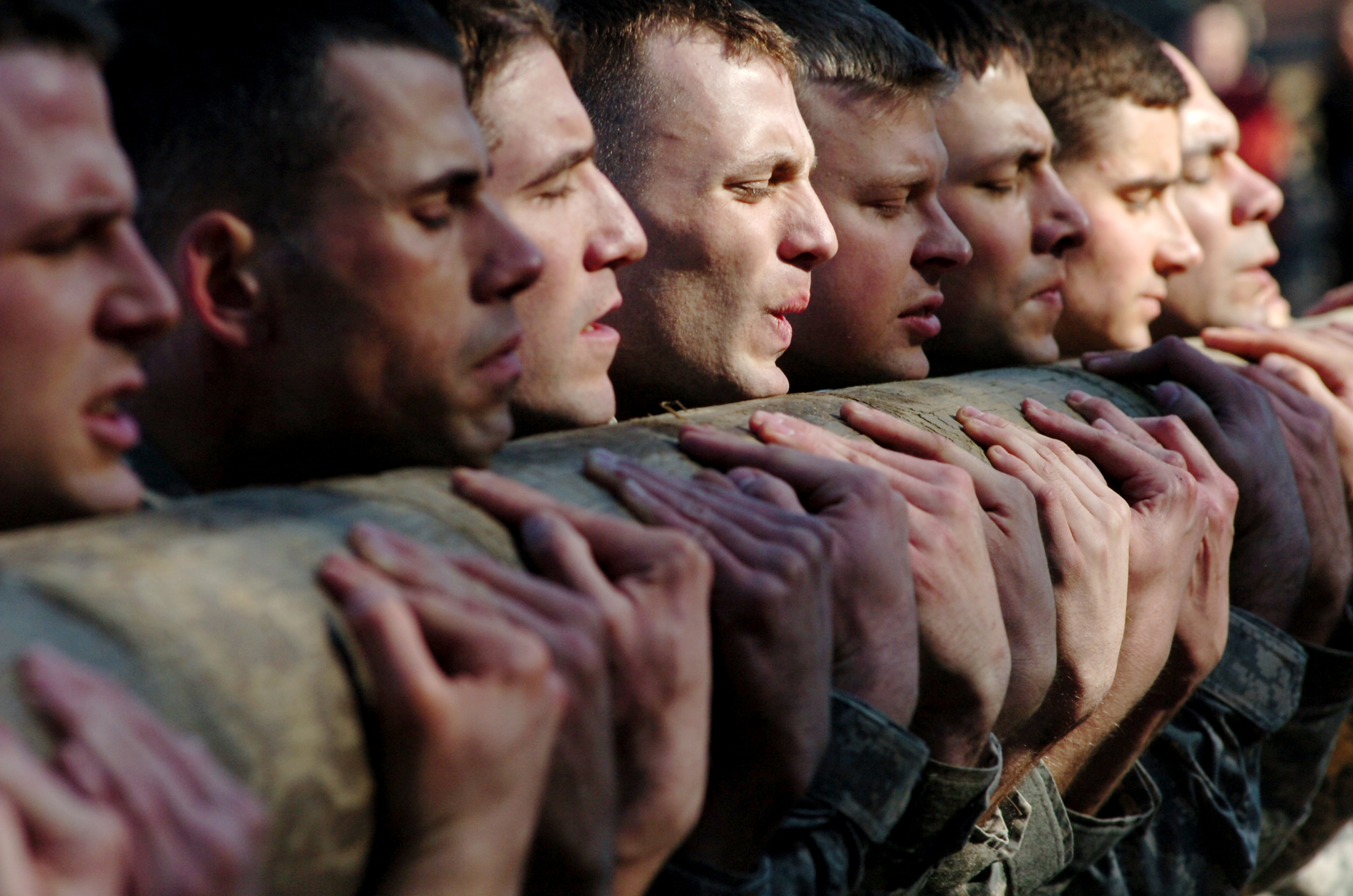
Candidates in SFAS class 04-10 participate in logs drills in January 2010.

Soldiers have two ways to volunteer to attend SFAS:

- As an existing soldier in the US Army with the enlisted rank of E-3 (private first class) or higher, and for officers the rank of O-2 (1st lieutenant) promotable to O-3 (captain), or existing O-3s.
- Initial Accession or IA, where an individual who has no prior military service or who separated from military service first attends Infantry One Station Unit Training (OSUT, the combination of Basic Combat Training and Advanced Individual Training), Airborne School, and a preparation course to prepare for SFAS. This program is commonly referred to as the "X-Ray Program", derived from "18X". The candidates in this program are known as "X-Rays". Active duty and National Guard components offer Special Forces Initial Accession programs. The active duty program is referred to as the "18X Program" because of the Initial Entry Code on the assignment orders.

==== Training at SFAS ====
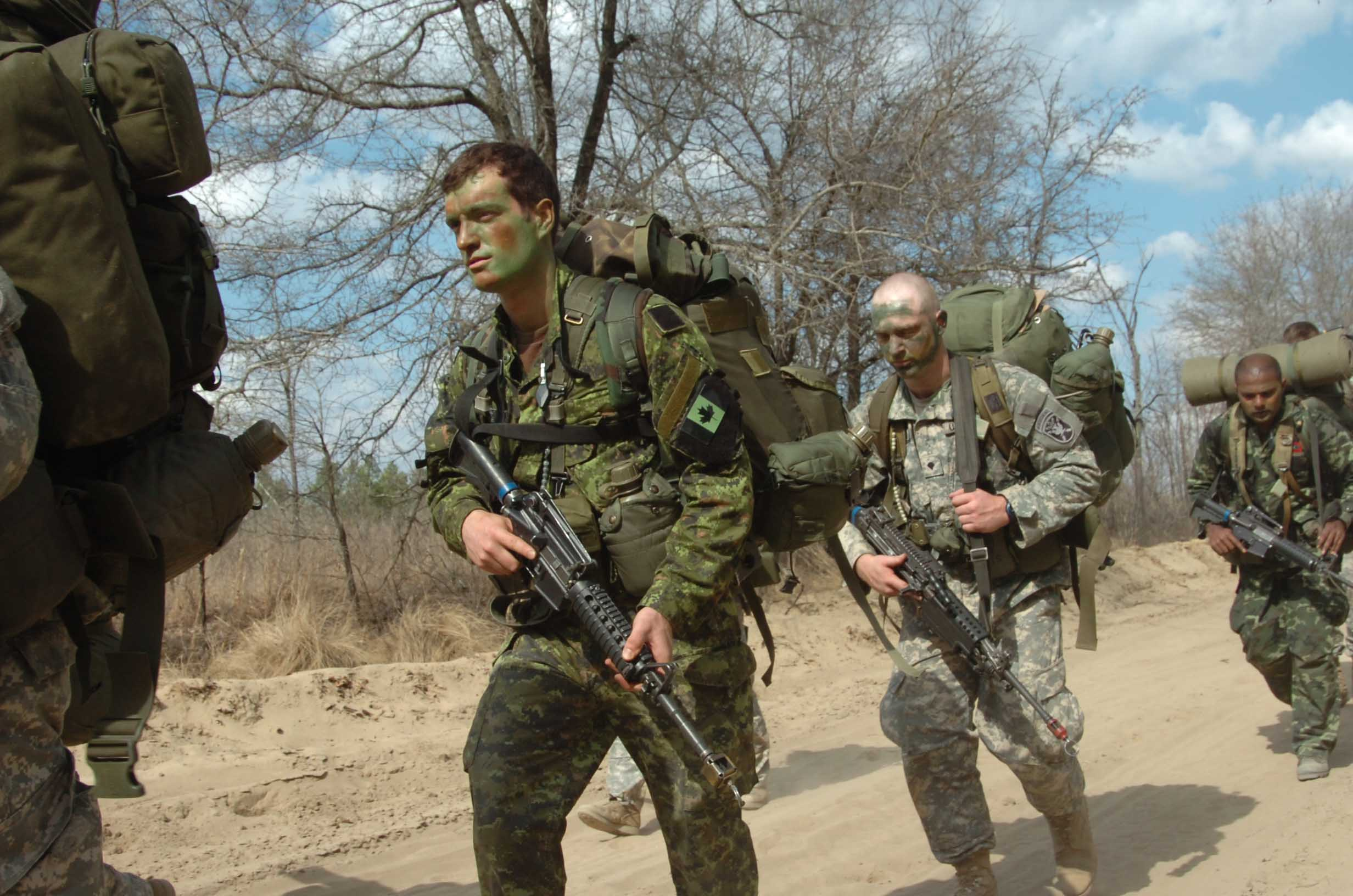
A Canadian soldier participates in a timed march alongside US Army soldiers during the Special Forces Qualification Course, 2009. The John F. Kennedy Special Warfare Center accepts students from allied nations.

The first phase of the Special Forces Qualification Course is Special Forces Assessment and Selection (SFAS), consisting of twenty-four days of training at Camp Mackall.

SFAS includes numerous long-distance land navigation courses. All land navigation courses are conducted day and night under heavy loads of equipment, in varied weather conditions, and in rough hilly terrain. Land navigation work is done individually with no assistance from instructors or fellow students, and is accomplished within a time limit. Each land navigation course has its maximum time limit reduced as course moves along, and are upwards of 12 miles (19 km) each. Instructors evaluate candidates by using obstacle course runs, team events including moving heavy loads such as telephone poles and old jeep trucks through sand as a 12-man team, the Army Physical Fitness Test (APFT), a swim assessment, and numerous psychological exams such as IQ tests and the Defense Language Aptitude Battery (DLAB) test. The final event is a road march of up to 32 miles (51 km) known as "the Trek" or Long Range Individual Movement (LRIM).

Selection outcomes:

- Quitters are Voluntarily Withdrawn (VW) by the course cadre, and are generally designated NTR or Not-to-Return. This generally ends any opportunity to become a Special Forces soldier. Active Duty military candidates will be returned to their previous units, and IA 18X candidates will be re-trained into a new MOS based upon the needs of the Army.
- Medically dropped (and not subsequently medically discharged) are often permitted to "re-cycle", and attempt the course as soon as they are able.
- Candidates completing the course but who are "Boarded" and not selected ("Non-Select") are generally given the opportunity to attend selection again in twelve or twenty-four months.

After selection at SFAS, all Active Duty enlisted and IA 18X candidates will be briefed on:

- The five Special Forces Active Duty Groups
- The four Special Forces Military Occupational Specialties (MOS) initially open to them
- The languages spoken in each Special Forces Group.

Candidates complete a "wish list". Enlisted candidates rank the available MOS (18B, 18C, 18D, 18E) in order of preference. Officer candidates will attend the 18A course. Both enlisted and officer candidates list in order of preference the SF Groups in which they prefer to serve (1st, 3rd, 5th, 7th, 10th) and the languages in which they prefer to be trained. Language selection is dependent on the Defense Language Aptitude Battery (DLAB) test scores of the candidate, as well as the SF Group to which they are assigned. Different SF Groups focus on different areas of responsibility (AOR), which require different languages. A board assigns each enlisted and officer candidate their MOS, Group placement, and language. The MOS, Group, and language a selected candidate is assigned is not guaranteed and is contingent upon the needs of the Special Forces community. Generally, 80% of selected candidates are awarded their primary choices.

Successful Active Duty candidates usually return to their previous units to await a slot in the Special Forces Qualification Course. Because an Initial Accession (IA) 18X candidate lacks a previous unit, they will normally enter the Q Course immediately.

All SF trainees must complete the United States Army Airborne School before beginning Phase 2 of the Q-Course.

=== Course Orientation and History: Phase I (7 weeks) ===
Course Description: Phase 1 of the SFQC is the SF Orientation Course, a seven-week introduction to SF. Dubbed the Orientation and History module, the course falls under the auspices of the 4th Battalion, 1st Special Warfare Training Group (Airborne). The course is separated into six modules:

==== Module A – Introduction to Unconventional Warfare ====
This module exposes the students to the overall learning objectives and outcomes of the SFQC, trains them in tactical guerrilla warfare, and provides them the operational and strategic context under which they will train for the remainder of the SFQC. Under the supervision of the cadre in Robin Sage and mentorship of the "G" chiefs, the students are expected to complete this phase with a firm understanding of what will be expected of them throughout the remainder of the SFQC and the importance of unconventional warfare in the Special Forces mission.

==== Module B – Introduction to Special Forces ====
This module is intended to provide the soldiers an understanding of Special Forces, their history, organization, attributes, and core tasks relating to their mission. Lessons include SFOD-A and SFOD-B numbering convention, command and control architecture, joint special-operations area, duties and responsibilities of each MOS, SF planning and organization, core mission and tasks, SOF physical fitness and nutrition. The training prepares potential Special Forces soldiers for what is expected of them and the standards they must acquire to graduate the SFQC and be members of the Army Special Forces.

==== Module C – Airborne Operations and Refresher ====
This module allows soldiers to maintain their jump proficiency and prepare for the training they will encounter throughout the SFQC.

==== Module D – Special Forces Planning ====
This module provides the soldiers an understanding of the Special Forces Mission Planning process. The soldiers are given classes on the Military Decision Making Process followed by a practical exercise that reinforces the training.

==== Module E – Operational Culture and Regional Analysis ====
This instructional module gives students a foundation of the battlespace including: operational culture and a systems' analysis of an area. The lessons include a view of that soldier's cultural lenses, leading to an understanding of the perspective of others as well as the use of PMESII-PT system of regional analysis to deduce the capabilities, people and environment of a given area. The Pineland Area Study will be used as the basis for analysis allowing for a comprehensive understanding of the training environment. The acronym PMESII-PT refers to a form of environmental analysis to examine the aspects of political, military, economic, social, information, infrastructure, physical environment, and time aspects of the military theater.

=== Language and Culture: Phase II (18–25 weeks) ===
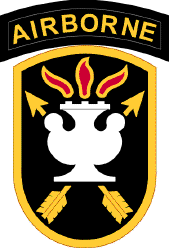
Emblem of the John F. Kennedy Special Warfare Center and School

Phase 2 of the SFQC focuses on language and culture. During Phase 2, soldiers receive basic special-operations language training in the language assigned to them at the completion of Special Forces Assessment and Selection. Languages are divided into four categories based on their degree of difficulty for native speakers of English. Soldiers assigned a Category I or II language will be enrolled in an eighteen-week language program, while soldiers assigned a Category III or IV language attend twenty-four weeks of language training.

Students receive instruction in three basic language skills: speaking, participatory listening, and reading (limited). An overview of physical and social systems, economics, politics and security, infrastructure, technology, culture, and regional studies forms the cultural component. Language instruction focuses on functional application geared toward mission-related tasks, enhanced rapport building techniques, cultural mitigation strategies, interpreting, and control of interpreter methods. Also during Phase 2, a progressive physical training program prepares for Phase 3.

To complete Phase 2, soldiers achieve a minimum of 1/1 Listening and Speaking as measured by the two-skill Oral Proficiency Interview.

=== Small Unit Tactics & SERE: Phase III (13 weeks) ===
Small Unit Tactics is the third phase in the qualification course. The 13-week program provides soldiers in the SFQC the apprentice-level tactical combat skills required to successfully operate on an SFOD-A.

Students master these tactical skills: advanced marksmanship; small-unit tactics; SF common tasks; urban operations; mission analysis; advanced special operations level 1; sensitive-site exploitation; military-decision-making process.

At the end of Phase 3, soldiers enroll in SERE Level C for training in support of the Code of Conduct. Training includes survival field craft skills, techniques of evasion, resistance to exploitation, and resolution skills in all types of environments. Students participate in a survival and evasion field-training exercise and in a resistance-training laboratory. The course spans three weeks with three phases of instruction. The first phase lasts approximately ten days of academic instruction on the Code of Conduct and SERE techniques incorporating classroom training and hands-on field craft.

The second phase is a five-day field training exercise for students to practice their survival and evasion skills by procuring food and water, constructing evasion fires and shelters, and evading tracker dogs and aggressor forces over long distances. The final phase takes place in the resistance-training laboratory (RTL) -- students are tested on their individual and collective abilities to resist interrogation and exploitation, and properly apply the six articles of the Code of Conduct in a realistic captivity scenario.

=== MOS Training Phase IV (14–50 weeks) ===
The purpose of this phase is to train selected soldiers in the critical MOS, skill level tasks, and competencies required to perform the duties of a member of an SF ODA. Candidates passed the SF Orientation Course, Language, SUT, and SERE before entering Phase IV training. Any variation from these prerequisites requires a waiver from the Commanding General, SWCS.

==== 18A – Special Forces Detachment Officer ====
This phase is intended to train selected officers in the critical branch tasks and competencies required to perform the duties of a detachment commander of a Special Forces ODA. The course focuses on the operational spectrum of problem analysis and resolution design associated with SF core missions across the elements of national power spectrum. Duties and functional-area familiarization of the 18 series MOSs: communications, engineer, medical, weapons, intelligence; the military decision-making process; special-operations mission planning; adaptive thinking and leadership; special reconnaissance; direct action; unconventional warfare; foreign internal defense; counterinsurgency operations; military operations in urban terrain; interagency operations; warrior skills; Advanced Special Operations skills; OPFUND management; elements of national power considerations; culture; in-depth core mission analysis; information operations, planning and conduct of ODA training; and three field-training exercises.

Prior to attending SFQC, officers must complete a captains career course, which is typically either the Special Operations Forces Officer Common Core or the Maneuver Captains Career Course.

- Module A – Special Forces Mission Analysis and Planning: The module provides student officers with an introduction to SOF mission peculiar software; fire support; an introduction to IO; mission planning using the MDMP; target analysis; infiltration/exfiltration planning; non-conventional unassisted evasion and recovery planning.
- Module B – Adaptive Thinking and Interpersonal Skills: This module develops the officer's ability to perform as an adaptive leader in an asymmetrical environment.
- Module C – SR/DA: This module teaches the doctrine associated with special reconnaissance and direct action missions, and provides an introduction to sensitive site exploitation operations and target site exploitation.
- Module D – Foreign Internal Defense/Counterinsurgency: This module develops the officer's capacity to develop a strategy based approach to FID support planning, and training employing methods of balanced, decentralized, intelligence driven lethal and non-lethal operations across the operational spectrum. It emphasizes the importance of combined, multi-national, and inter-agency integrated operations, and the establishment and functionality of mission supportive informal command relationships to stimulate their capacity to act as force multipliers. This module includes a FID/JCET FTX for students to work by, with, and through host-nation partners.
- Module E – Unconventional Warfare: This module teaches student officers to implement the development processes of an insurgency, and identify the components of an insurgency. Implement the role and functions in operations as it relates to the seven phases of US sponsored insurgency. Demonstrate the uses of Unconventional Warfare (UW) as a strategic option during the initial phases of a Geographic Combatant Commander's Campaign Plan. This module includes UW Case Studies and a Case Studies Brief and a UW Pilot Team FTX.
- Module F – Advanced Special Operations: This module familiarizes students with the basic fundamentals of advanced special operations.
- Module J – MOS Cross Training: This module provides officers with knowledge and education of the duties, responsibilities, and capabilities of the individual MOS members of the SFODA. It identifies activities the 18B, 18C, 18D, 18E are trained on during the SFQC, and provides a familiarization of the role of the SF Warrant Officers, Operations Sergeant, and Intelligence Sergeant to future detachment commanders. This module provides limited MOS-specific cross-training to students in the 18A Phase IV SFQC.

The Special Forces operational detachment commander is a captain with the 18A MOS award. This captain commands the detachment, and is responsible for everything the detachment does or fails to do. The commander may command or advise an indigenous battalion combat force. The commander regularly meets abroad with the country team to include ambassadors, foreign ministers of defense, and foreign presidents. The captain ensures their detachment is trained for combat anytime, anywhere, and in any environment. The commander ensures they and all their detachment members are cross-trained on all assigned equipment and duties.

==== 18B – Weapons Sergeant ====
Weapons sergeants have a working knowledge with weapons systems found throughout the world. They gain extensive knowledge about various types of small arms, submachine guns, machine guns, grenade launchers, forward-observer procedures, anti-tank missiles, and directing indirect-fire weapons (mortars and artillery). They learn the capabilities and characteristics of U.S. and foreign air defense and anti-tank weapons systems, tactical training, and range fire as well as how to teach marksmanship and the employment of weapons to others. Weapons sergeants employ conventional and unconventional tactics and techniques as tactical mission leaders. They can recruit, organize, train, and advise/command indigenous combat forces up to company size. Course instruction includes direct- and indirect-fire systems and procedures: mortars, light/heavy weapons, sniper systems, anti-armor systems, forward observer and fire direction center procedures, close air support; Warrior skills; combatives; plan and conduct training; field training exercise.

- Module A – Light Weapons: This module produces a weapons sergeant capable of employing, maintaining, and engaging targets with select U.S. and foreign pistols, rifles, shotguns, submachine guns, machine guns, and grenade launchers
- Module B – Heavy Weapons: This module produces a weapons sergeant capable of employing, maintaining, and engaging targets with select U.S. and foreign anti-armor weapons, crew-served weapons, mortars, and in the use of observed-fire procedures.
- Module C – Tactics: This module produces a weapons sergeant proficient in Special Forces and light-infantry tactics through platoon level.
- Tactics FTX: This module develops the student's knowledge, skills, and understanding of the Special Forces weapons sergeant on tactics, techniques, and procedures affecting mission planning as it pertains to SF operations. This increases the student's understanding of his operational environment.

==== 18C – Engineer Sergeant ====
Engineer Sergeants are experts in employing offensive and defensive combat engineer capabilities, including demolitions, landmines, explosives, and improvised munitions, construction, home-made explosives, reconnaissance, and target analysis.

Special Forces engineers know and understand advanced demolition skills for destroying targets with non-electric and electric firing systems, with U.S., foreign, and civilian demolition components. Engineer sergeants plan, supervise, lead, perform, and instruct all aspects of combat engineering, demolition operations, and theater-of operations construction engineering in either English or their target language. They can recruit, organize, train, and advise/command indigenous combat forces up to company size. The course covers: basic military construction techniques and procedures; basic and intermediate demolitions; Special Forces Tactical Facilities, UXO/IED; target analysis/interdiction and mission planning; Warrior skills; combatives; plan and conduct training; and field-training exercises.

- Module A – Demolitions: To provide students with baseline knowledge of explosives theory, their characteristics and common uses, formulas for calculating various types of charges, and standard methods of priming and placing these charges. Lesson plans include explosive entry techniques, demolition material, demolition safety, firing systems, calculation and placement of charges, expedient charges, and range operations.
- Module B – Construction: Provides students with knowledge and training in the role of an SF engineer; blueprints (read/design); construction of a masonry wall; welding, concrete construction, types and sitings of obstacles, wire obstacles, fighting positions, bunkers and shelters, camp construction/fortification, heavy equipment operations (skid-steer loader, scraper, grader, scoop loader, utility tractor), electrical wiring, plumbing and logistical operations. Soldiers learn to read blueprints as well as design and construct a theater-of-operations building, as well as field fortifications to be used as fire bases while deployed on an SFODA.
- Module C – UXO/IED: Provides students with knowledge and skills in the construction, demolition, and emplacement of special-purpose munitions and unexploded ordnance, including IEDs and homemade explosives.
- Module D – Reconnaissance: Provides students with knowledge and training in target analysis/interdiction and mission planning.
- Module E – Engineer Field Training Exercise: This completes the foreign internal defense scenario-based 18C SF engineer tasks.

==== 18D – Medical Sergeant ====
Medical sergeants specialize in trauma management, infectious diseases, cardiac life support, and surgical procedures, with a basic understanding of veterinary and dental medicine. General healthcare and emergency healthcare are stressed in training.

Medical sergeants provide emergency, routine, and long-term medical care for detachment members and associated allied members and host-nation personnel. They establish field medical facilities to support unconventional-warfare operations. They provide veterinary care. They prepare the medical portion of area studies, briefbacks, and operation plans and orders.

Soldiers selected for MOS 18D attend 250 days of advanced medical training. Additionally, they spend two months on a trauma rotation in hospital emergency rooms. 18D trainees receive instruction involving lifelike human simulation models and Hollywood-type make-up effects worn by fellow students to conduct training, within safe limits guided by cadre, to simulate potential casualties they may receive and treat while on the modern battlefield or in a potential clinical environment. The medical-training phase includes a nationally accredited emergency medical technician paramedic program. They can recruit, organize, train, and advise or command indigenous combat forces up to company size.

The training involves two stages: (1) the Special Operations Combat Medic (SOCM) course, which Special amphibious reconnaissance corpsmen (SARC) and medics in the 75th Ranger Regiment, 160th Special Operations Aviation Regiment, and the United States Navy SEALs also attend and (2) the Special Forces Medical Sergeant course (SFMS), which just Medical Sergeants and SARCs complete. SOCM training is required to be refreshed every two years, while SFMS training is refreshed every four years.

==== 18E – Communications Sergeant ====
The Special Forces communications sergeant learns U.S. communication systems as well as those systems globally. He incorporates this information and technology into his communications planning, and teaches it to the other members of his ODA. Communications sergeants have a grounding in communication basics, communications procedures, computer technology, assembly, and systems applications.

They understand communication theory –- install, operate, and maintain radio systems across all bands. They are able to make communications in voice to data, and to read voice and data radio nets by using computer systems and networks.

Communications sergeants are experts in sending and receiving messages to link the SFODA with its command and control elements. They are familiar with antenna theory, radio wave propagation, and how to teach it to others. Communications sergeants prepare the communications portion of area studies, briefbacks, and operation plans and orders. They can recruit, organize, train, and advise/command indigenous combat forces up to company size.

The course provides training in computer applications, satellite radios, satellite and antenna theory, and radio wave propagation. Soldiers learn to construct field-expedient antennas, employ communications procedures, techniques, and communicate throughout high frequency (HF), VHF, and UHF spectrums, culminating with a field training exercise. The course develops a SF Communicator capable of employing, accessing, and familiar with SF, joint, and inter-agency communications.

- Module A – Course Orientation: Provides students with the information of everything covered in the 18E Course, the student evaluation plan and conduct while attending the course.
- Module B – Computer Applications: This module instructs Soldiers to become proficient in computer applications A+ training and NET+ training. The A+ training provides soldiers the training necessary to troubleshoot and repair basic computer components, hard drives, power supplies, motherboards, video cards, and other internal components of a computer. The Net+ trains the soldier to network computers in a LAN and WAN, and setting-up servers and routers. Installing, operating, and maintaining the SND-L and SOMPE-G. Students are postured at the end of this module for external certification in CompTIA+ network and security.
- Module C – Communications Procedures: The module instructs the soldiers on basic communications fundamentals such as basic radio theory, basic electricity, radio telephone procedures, signal-operating instructions, communication security, power applications, and information operations/electronic warfare as they pertain to an SF communications sergeant.
- Module D – Radios Common to the Army: Students receive instruction on the operation of radios and radio-secure systems common to Army units such as the AN/PRC-148, AN/PRC119F, AN/PYQ-10 simple key loader, and the AN/CYZ-10 electronic transfer device.
- Module E – Satellite Communications: Soldiers learn satellite theory, the use of satellite radios such as the AN/PSC-5C/D AN/PRC-117G and BGAN antenna, and the radio's modes of operation, demand assigned multiple access, and point-to-point operations. Soldiers learn the use of multiple computer applications such as VIASAT, PDA-184, and MoVer to install, operate, and maintain satellite communications links.
- Module F – Communications Planning: Soldiers train in the matters of communications planning such as transmission site selection, the duties and responsibilities of the SF communications sergeant, signal support in the Special Forces group, MDMP, mission planning, and preparing a signal annex to an operations order as it pertains to their duties and responsibilities.
- Module G – High Frequency Communications: The module instructs soldiers in the use of the HF radio spectrum to communicate, such as training in antenna theory and radio wave propagation, the calculation of length to determine to make HF antennas for short, medium, and long-range communications. The operation and troubleshooting of the AN/PRC-137 special mission radio set (SMRS) and AN/PRC-150 are also taught.
- Module I – Field Performance: This module measures the soldier's proficiency in the use and techniques of the equipment and procedures taught throughout the SF Communications Sergeant Course. The soldiers achieves a passing grade to become qualified.

=== UW CULEX (Robin Sage): Phase V (4 weeks) ===
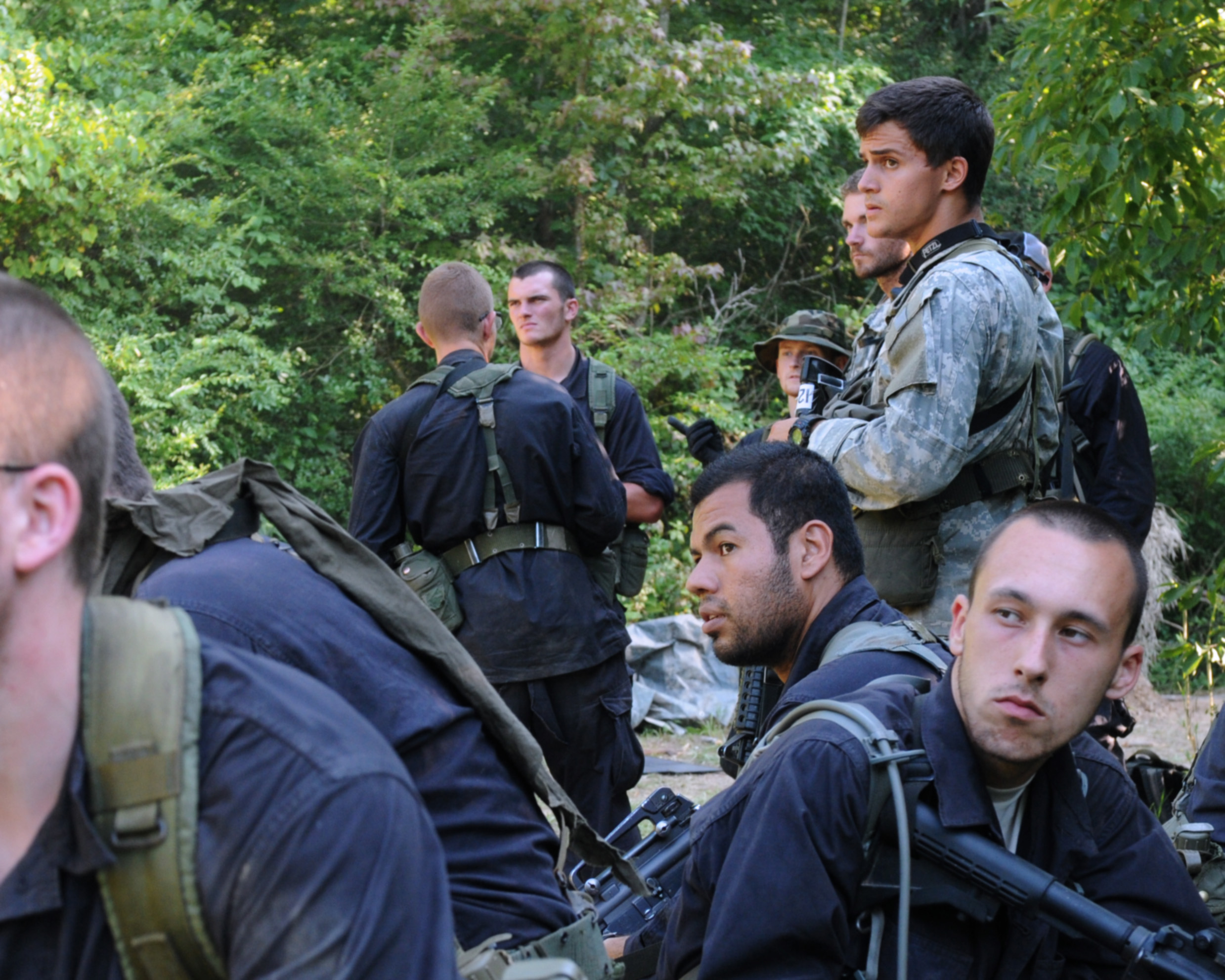
A Special Forces candidate conducts a pre-mission rehearsal with Army ROTC cadets role playing guerilla fighters during Robin Sage.

Since 1974, the culmination exercise for the SFQC has been "Robin Sage". (Prior to 1974, similar exercises were held under the name Devil's Arrow, Swift Strike, and Guerrilla USA.) During Robin Sage, held across 15 rural North Carolina counties, soldiers put all of the skills they learned throughout the SFQC to the test in an unconventional-warfare training exercise.

The exercise, broken into two phases, puts students on their first SFODA. The SFODA is trained, advised, and mentored throughout the exercise—from mission receipt through planning and infiltration. During the first week, the students are taught the necessary skills to survive and succeed in an Unconventional Warfare (UW) environment using the small group instruction teaching method. The remaining three weeks focus on their planning and application during Robin Sage. The students are placed into an environment of political instability characterized by armed conflict to force soldiers to exercise individual and collective problem-solving. A key to the success of the Robin Sage training is its real-world feel by the use of guerrilla forces. The SFODA must assess the combat effectiveness of the G-forces, then trains them in basic individual tasks from each of the MOSs as well as collective tasks in basic small-unit tactics, while remaining responsive to asymmetrical challenges. Just as language plays a key role in all other phases of the pipeline, language skills will be put to the test during Robin Sage. During this training, the SFODA must demonstrate their knowledge of UW doctrine and operational techniques.

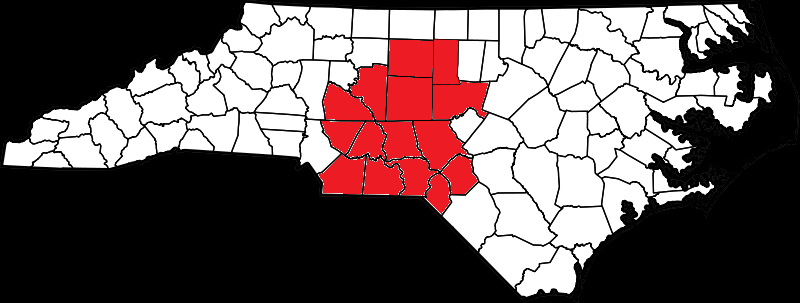
The 15 counties of the People's Republic of Pineland

On the last day of isolation, the detachment presents their plan to the battalion command and staff. This plan explains the ways the commander intends to execute the mission. The next day, the students make an airborne infiltration into the fictitious country of "Pineland". They contact guerrilla forces to initiate Robin Sage. Students accomplish their task of training, advising, and assisting the guerrillas. The training educates the guerrillas in various specialties, including weapons, communications, medical, and demolitions. The training is designed to enable the guerrillas to begin liberating their country from oppression. It is the last portion of the Special Forces Qualification Course before they receive their "Green Berets".

Robin Sage involves approximately 100 Special Forces students, 100 counter-insurgent personnel (OPFOR), 200 guerrilla personnel, 40 auxiliary personnel, and 50 cadre. The local communities of North Carolina also participate in the exercise by roleplaying as citizens of Pineland. The exercise is conducted in approximately 50,000 square miles (130,000 km^{2}) of North Carolina. Many of the OPFOR and guerrilla personnel are North Carolina residents and are paid for their participation. The role of the guerrilla chief, "G-chief", is sometimes played by a retired Green Beret. During the summer Robin Sage exercises, Army ROTC cadets from The Citadel and cadets from the United States Military Academy act as guerrilla fighters.

==== 2002 death during Robin Sage ====
During a Robin Sage exercise on 23 February 2002, Moore County Deputy Sheriff Randall Butler shot and killed 1st Lieutenant Tallas Tomeny, 31, wounded Staff Sergeant Stephen Phelps, 25, and detained civilian volunteer Charles Leiber. While on patrol, Deputy Butler pulled over the three exercise participants after he determined their behavior indicated they might be searching for robbery targets.

During the road-side investigation, Leiber (the driver of the pick-up truck) was led by Butler to Butler's patrol cruiser for questioning. After leaving Leiber in his patrol car, Butler led Tomeny from the pick-up passenger seat to the truck bed where Phelps was riding. Butler wished to inspect a bag Tomeny possessed containing Tomeny's M4 service rifle. Butler later admitted he had no knowledge of the weapon at this point because the compartment containing the rifle remained unopened.

The soldiers, under the assumption Butler was aware of the ongoing Robin Sage training, attempted to bribe him with "Don" (Pineland currency), which looks similar to Monopoly money. Butler tussled with Tomeny for the bag, pushed Tomeny away, then threw the bag to the side. Tomeny backed-up and raised his hands, and, according to court documents, "Tomeny [...] did not bump Butler or reach for Butler’s service weapon." Butler re-holstered his service pistol, and "sprayed Tomeny in the eyes with pepper spray until the pepper spray appeared to run out," which caused Tomeny to scream and rub his eyes with his hands. Phelps moved from his position in the pick-up truck's bed, grabbed the bag with Tomeny's service rifle, and ran for cover in the direction of the woods.

Deputy Butler shot Tomeny, turned, and shot the fleeing Phelps who had, after hearing the shots fired at Tomeny, turned suddenly, and due to the wet pavement slipped and fell to his hands and knees. Phelps did not make any attempts to open the bag, and was shot by Butler twice. According to Butler's counsel, he warned Phelps to show his hands, but this was contested.

Prior to the incident, there was confidence within the military hierarchy that all North Carolina law enforcement officials were familiar with the exercise. Press releases are now issued before an exercise commences, and law enforcement officials participating in the training are required to wear a distinctive uniform.

On 27 October 2009, a federal jury in Greensboro, North Carolina, awarded $750,000 to Phelps after he sued Butler and the Moore County Sheriff's office. Tomeny's estate settled out-of-court with the sheriff's office. Jurors said they did not believe portions of Butler's testimony.

Butler sued the US government for $5 million for "emotional distress" and "post-traumatic stress disorder" as a result of shooting Tomeny and Phelps; the case was dismissed.

=== Phase VI (1 Week): Graduation ===
Phase 6 is the final phase and consists of one week of out processing, the Regimental First Formation where students don their green berets for the first time, and the graduation ceremony.

== Further training ==
After successfully completing the Special Forces Qualification Course, Special Forces soldiers are then eligible for many advanced skills courses, as listed below. These include, but are not limited to, the Military Free Fall Parachutist Course (MFF) (this is now a requirement for all members of the Special Forces), the Combat Diver Qualification Course and the Special Forces Sniper Course (formerly known as the Special Operations Target Interdiction Course). All Special Forces soldiers conduct real world, non-combat operations in order to maintain their skills. Special Forces Medical Sergeants (18D) often work in both military and civilian Emergency Rooms in between deployments.

Additionally, because one of the Special Forces soldier's primary mission is the instruction of other forces, they participate extensively in special operations training courses offered by other services and allied nations throughout their careers.

Post Q Course Special Forces training
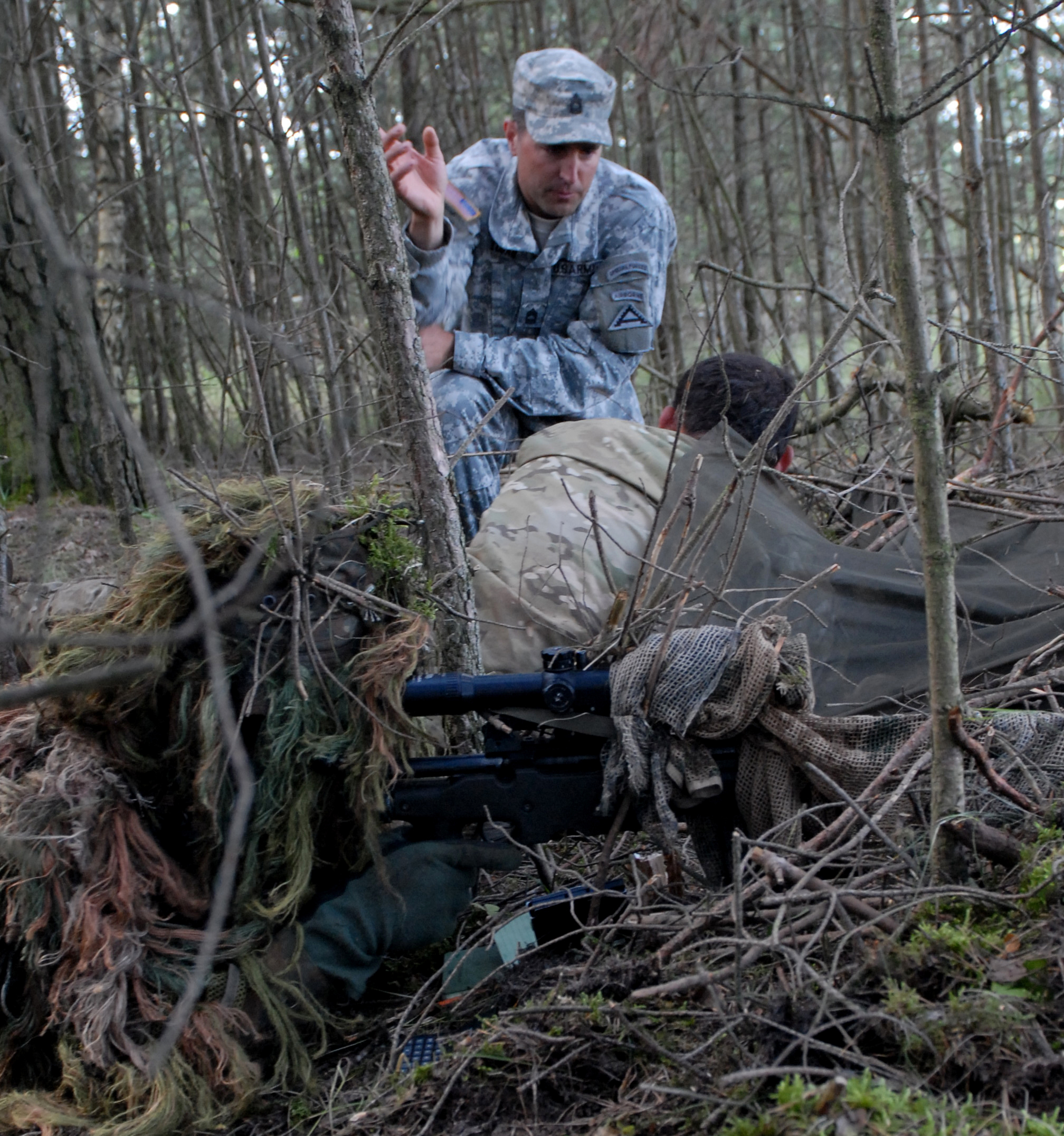
A Special Forces Master Sergeant gives pointers to two other Special Forces soldiers at a NATO sniper course in Germany.

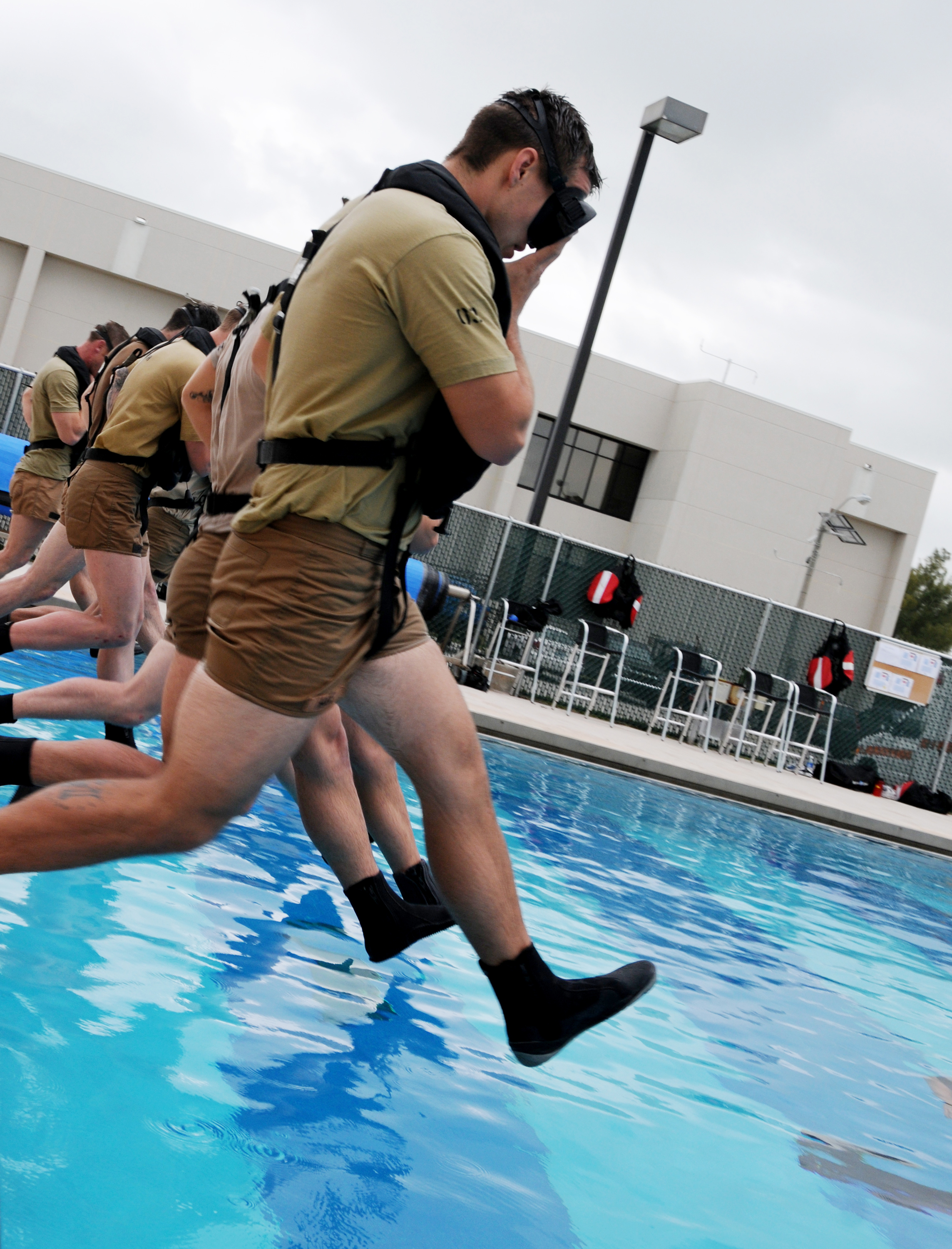
Entering the water during the pool phase of the Special Forces Underwater Operations School at Naval Air Station Key West.

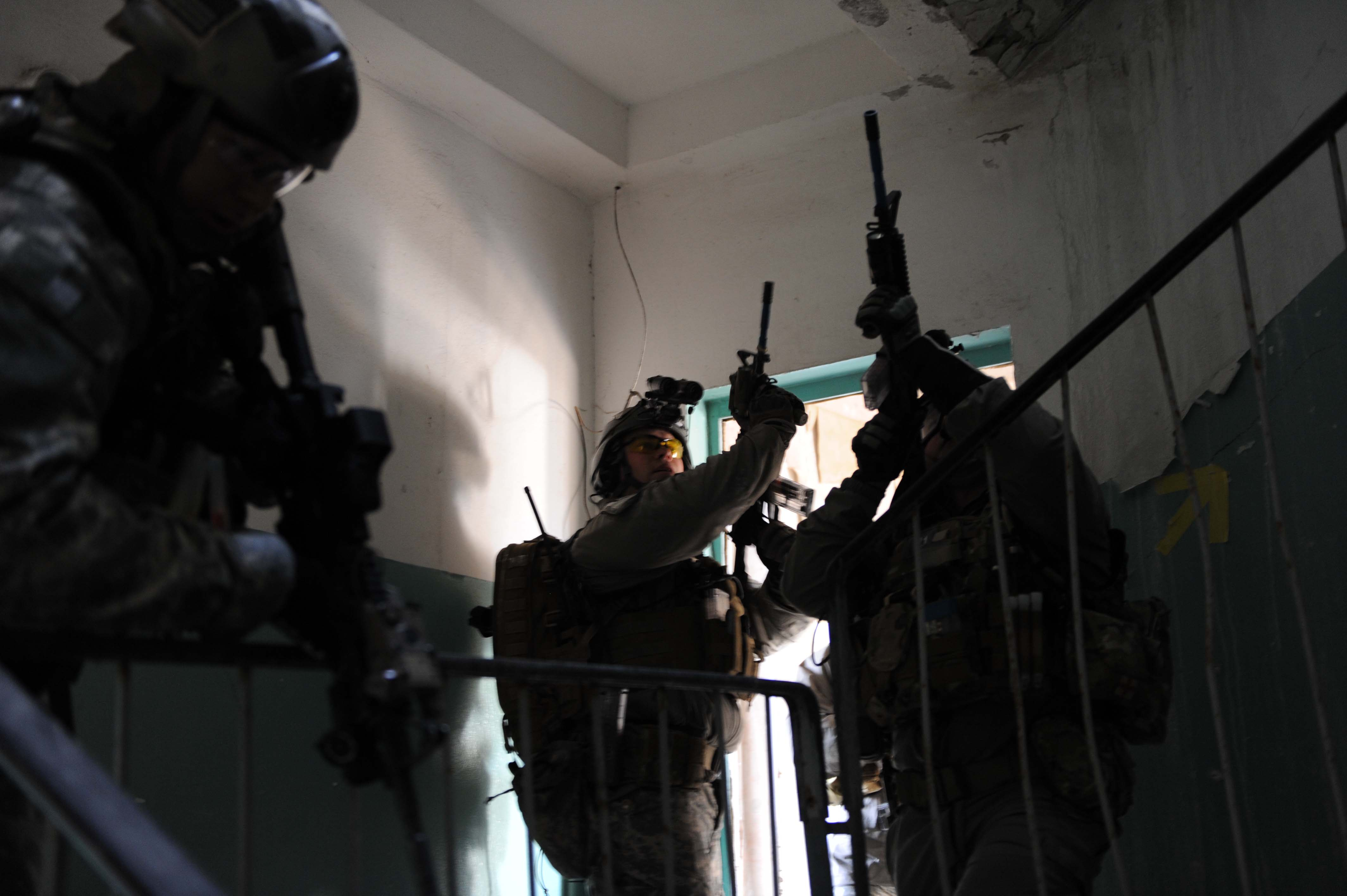
Conducting hostage rescue drills in Germany.

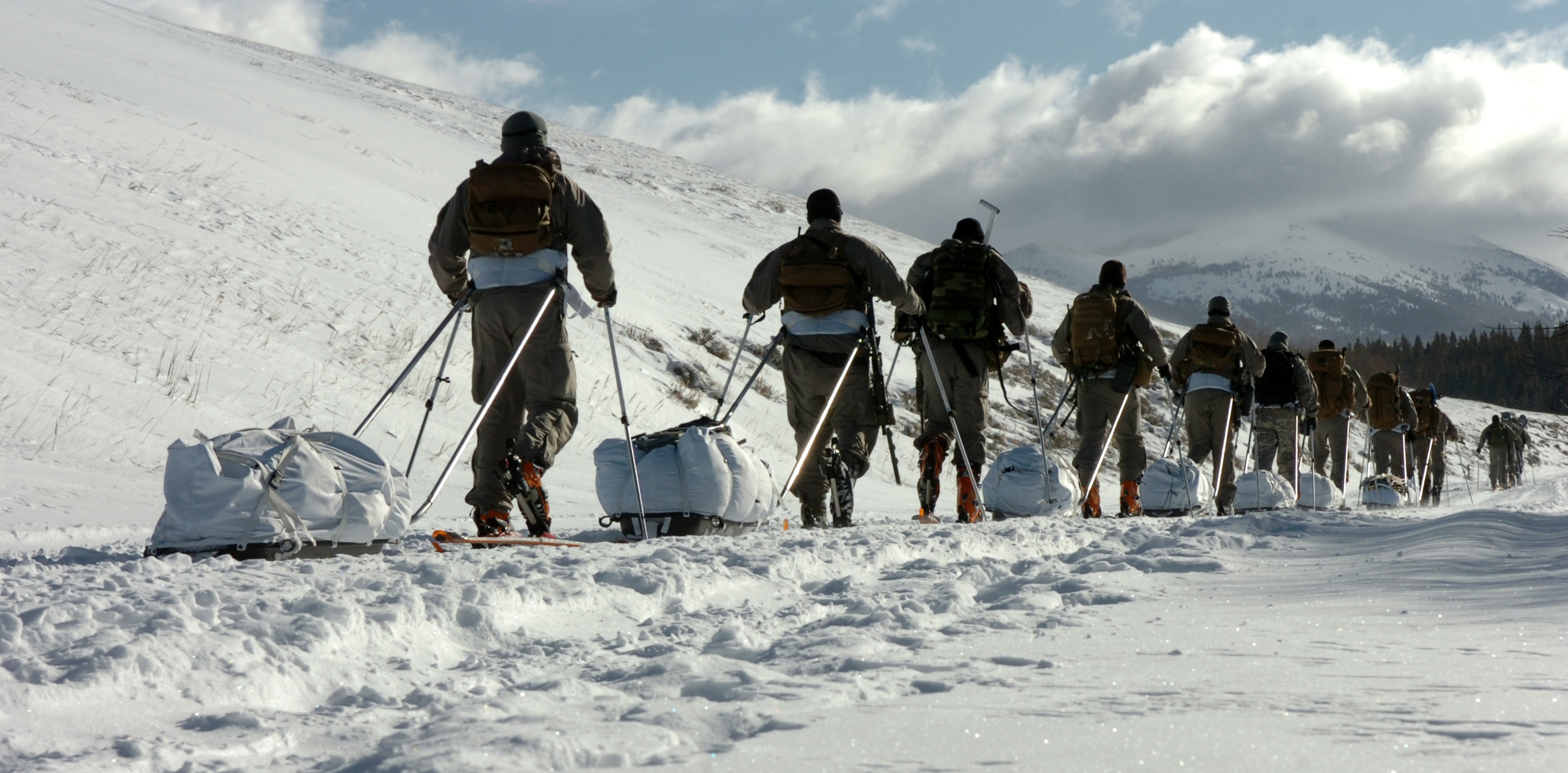
Cold weather training in Gunnison National Forest.

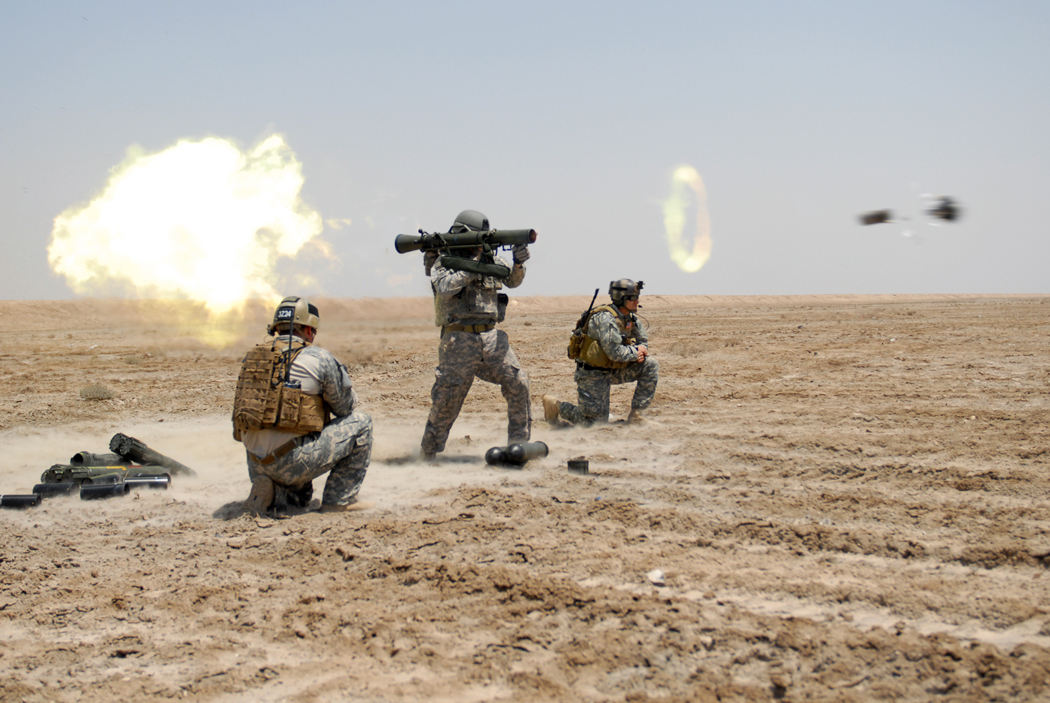
Firing a Carl Gustaf 8.4cm recoilless rifle during training in Basrah, Iraq.

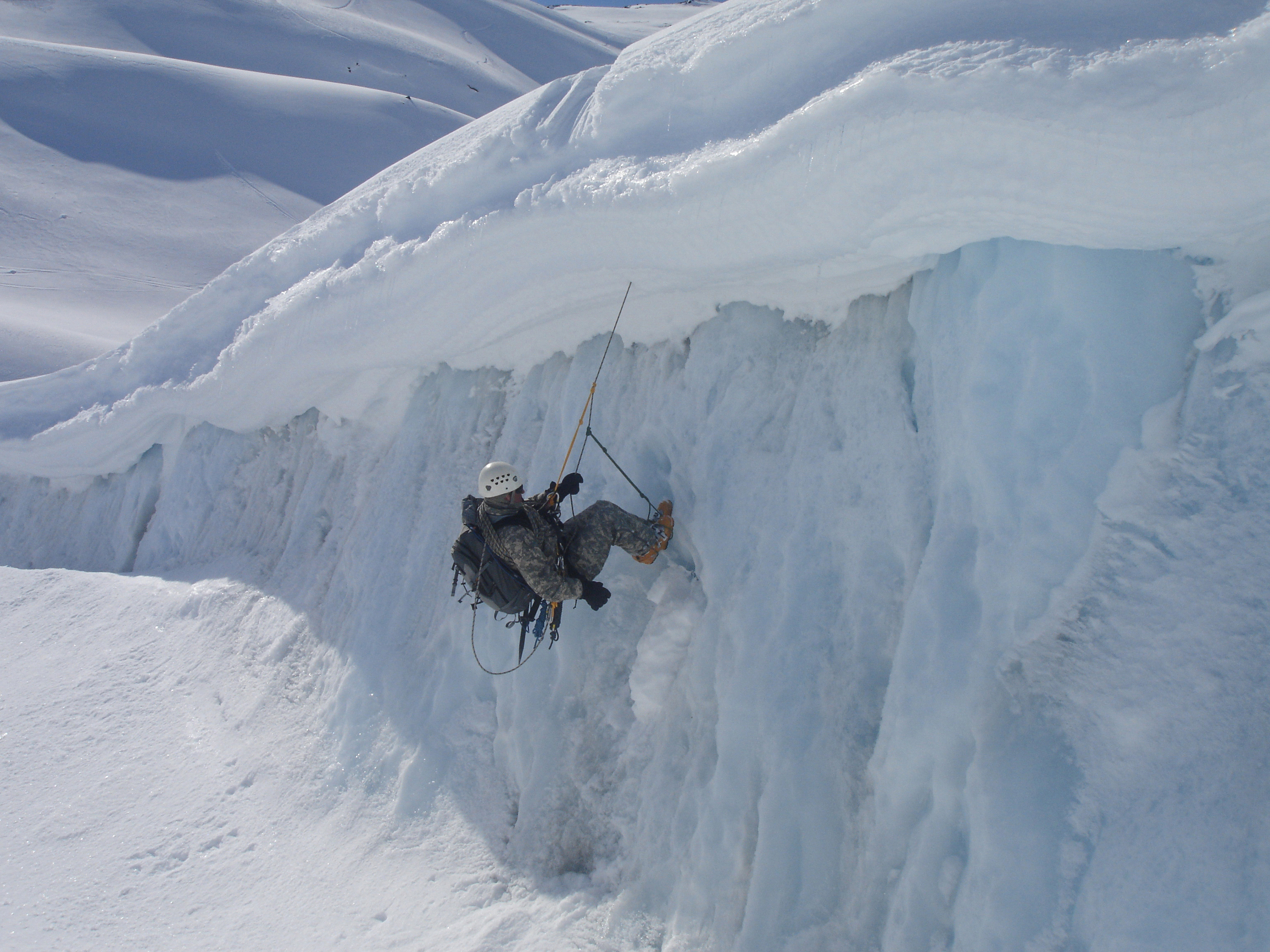
Climbing out of the Worthington Glacier in Alaska at the Special Forces Master Mountaineer course.

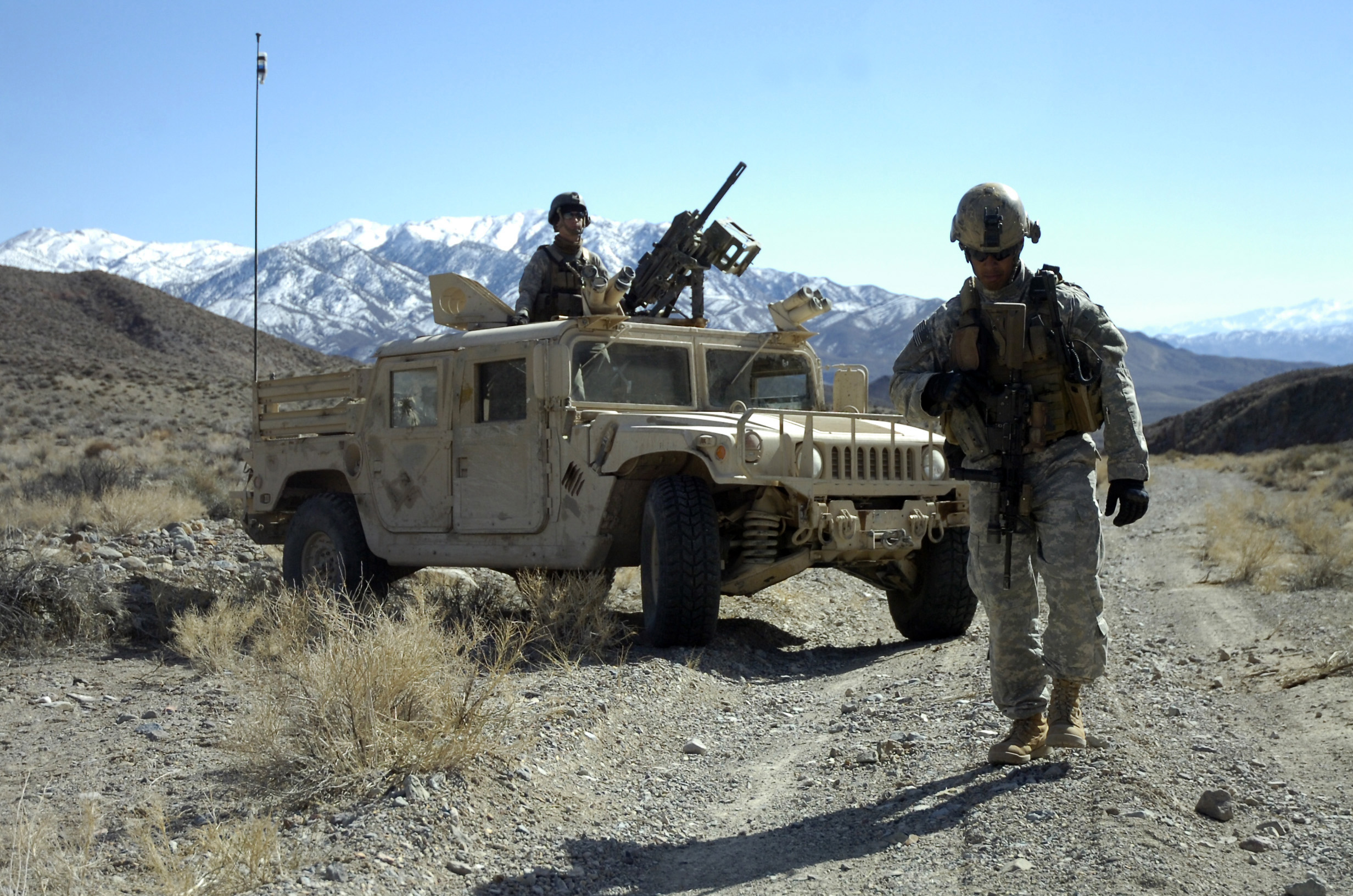
Practicing IED detection and clearing at the Hawthorne Army Depot.

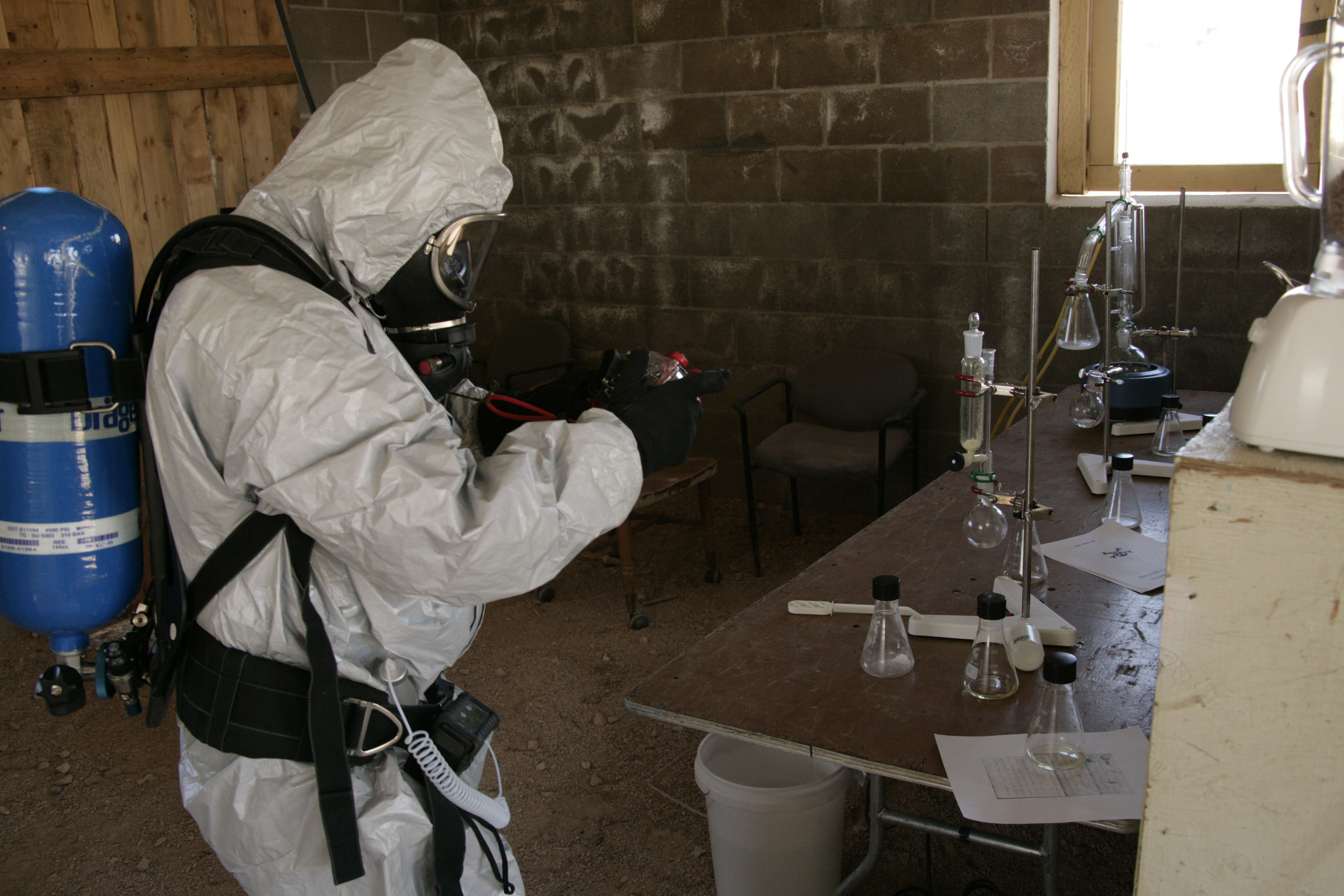
Chemical Recon Detachment training at Fort Carson.

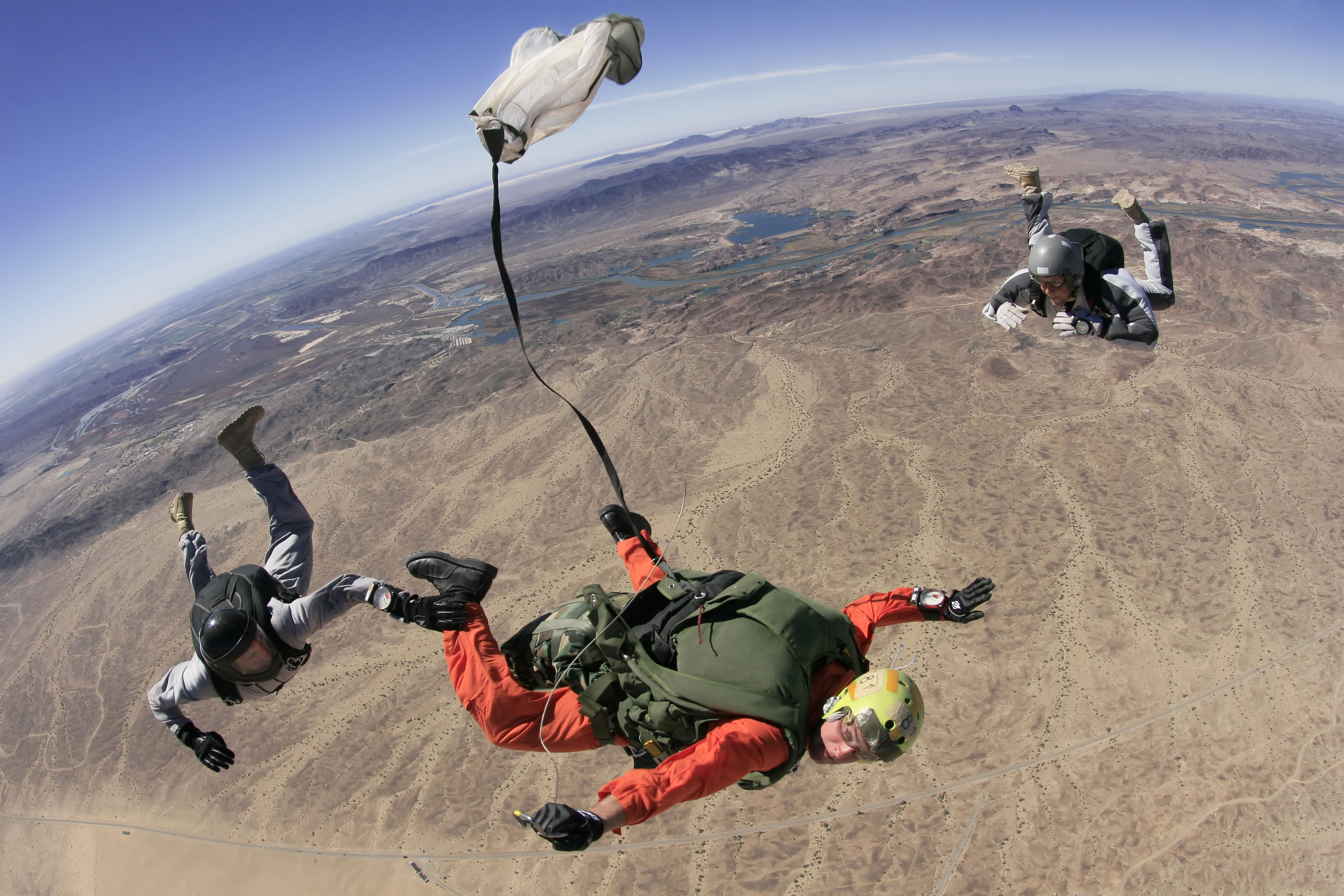
Two instructors critique a Special Forces soldier at a HALO jump course at the Yuma Proving Grounds.

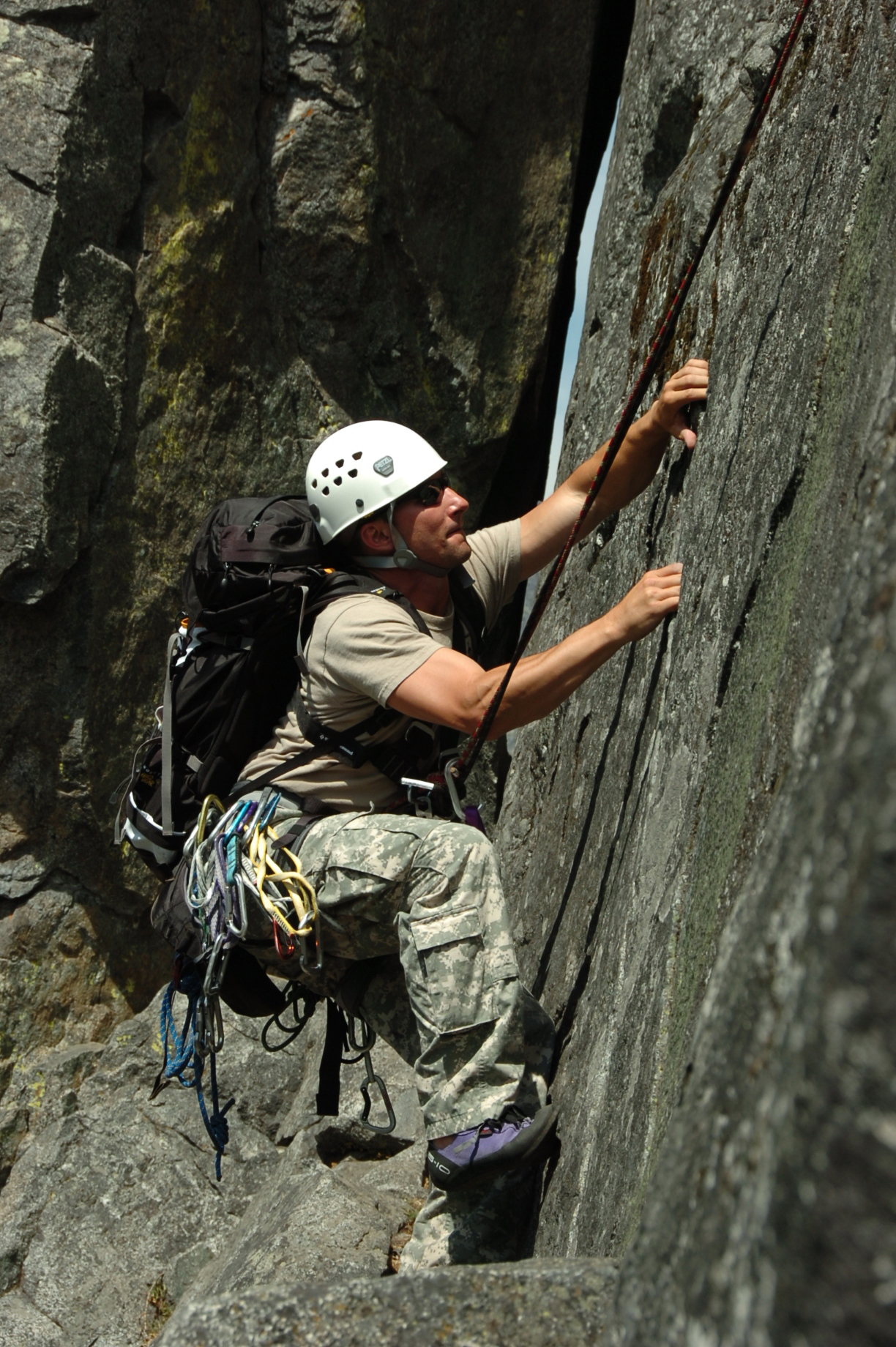
Conducting training at Castle Rock near Leavenworth, Washington to maintain basic mountaineering skills.

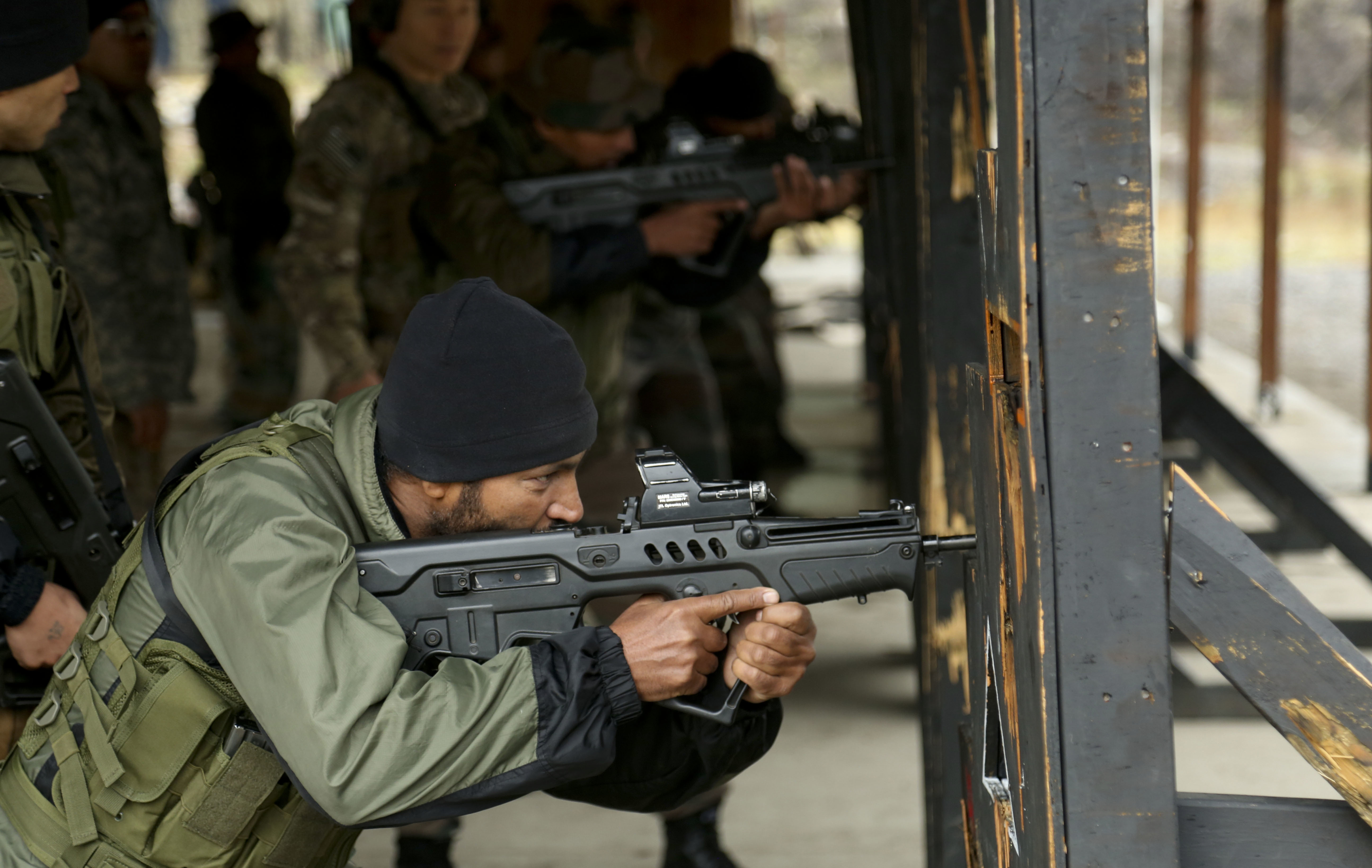
Operators from 1st SFG (A) train with an Indian Para SF armed with a IWI Tavor.

Other training opportunities at the John F. Kennedy Special Warfare Center and School include:

- Combat Diver (Key West, Florida)
  - Special Forces Combat Diver Qualification Course (CDQC)
  - Special Forces Combat Diving Supervisor Course (CDSC)
  - Special Forces Combat Diving Medical Technician (CDMT)
- Military Free Fall (Yuma Proving Ground, Arizona)
  - Military Free Fall Parachutist Course (MFFPC)
  - Military Free Fall Jumpmaster Course (MFFJM)
  - Military Free Fall Instructor Course (MFFIC)
  - Military Free Fall Advanced Tactical Infiltration Course (ATIC)
- Advanced Weapons and Tactics (Fort Bragg, North Carolina)
  - Special Forces Sniper Course (SFSC)
  - Special Forces Advanced Reconnaissance Target Analysis Exploitation Techniques Course (SFARTAETC)
  - Security Force Assistance Foreign Weapons Course (SFAFWC)
  - USASOC SOF-Peculiar Weapons Repair Course (USASOC SOF-P)
  - Special Operations Foreign and Non-Standard Armorers Course (SOFNAC)
- Advanced Skills
  - Advanced Special Operations Techniques Course (ASOTC)
  - Advanced Special Operations Techniques Managers Course (ASOTMC)
  - Special Warfare Brighton Course
  - Special Warfare Touchstone Course
  - Special Warfare Network Development Course (SWNDC)
  - Special Warfare Operational Design Course (SWODC)
  - Special Operations Military Deception Planner's Course (SMPC)
  - Special Forces Intelligence Sergeant Course (MOS 18F)
  - Operator Advanced Course
  - Exploitation Analysis Center Course
  - Technical Exploitation Course
  - SOF Surveillance Awareness Course
  - SOF Technical Surveillance Course
  - SOF Technical Support Detachment Course
  - Special Operations Terminal Attack Controller Course (SOTACC)

Conventional training opportunities include:

- Ranger School
- Static-line Jumpmaster School
- Pathfinder School
- Reconnaissance and Surveillance Leaders Course
- Scout Leader Course
- Air Assault School
- Jungle Operations Training Center
- Northern Warfare Training Center
- Desert Warrior Course
- Army Mountain Warfare School
- Special Forces Advanced Mountain Operations School
- United States Army Sniper School
