= Gordon Graham =

Gordon Graham is the name of:

- L. Gordon Graham (born 1949), British philosopher
- Gordon M. Graham (1918–2001), U.S. Air Force general
