= Gordon M. Graham =

United States Air Force general and World War II flying ace

Gordon Marion Graham
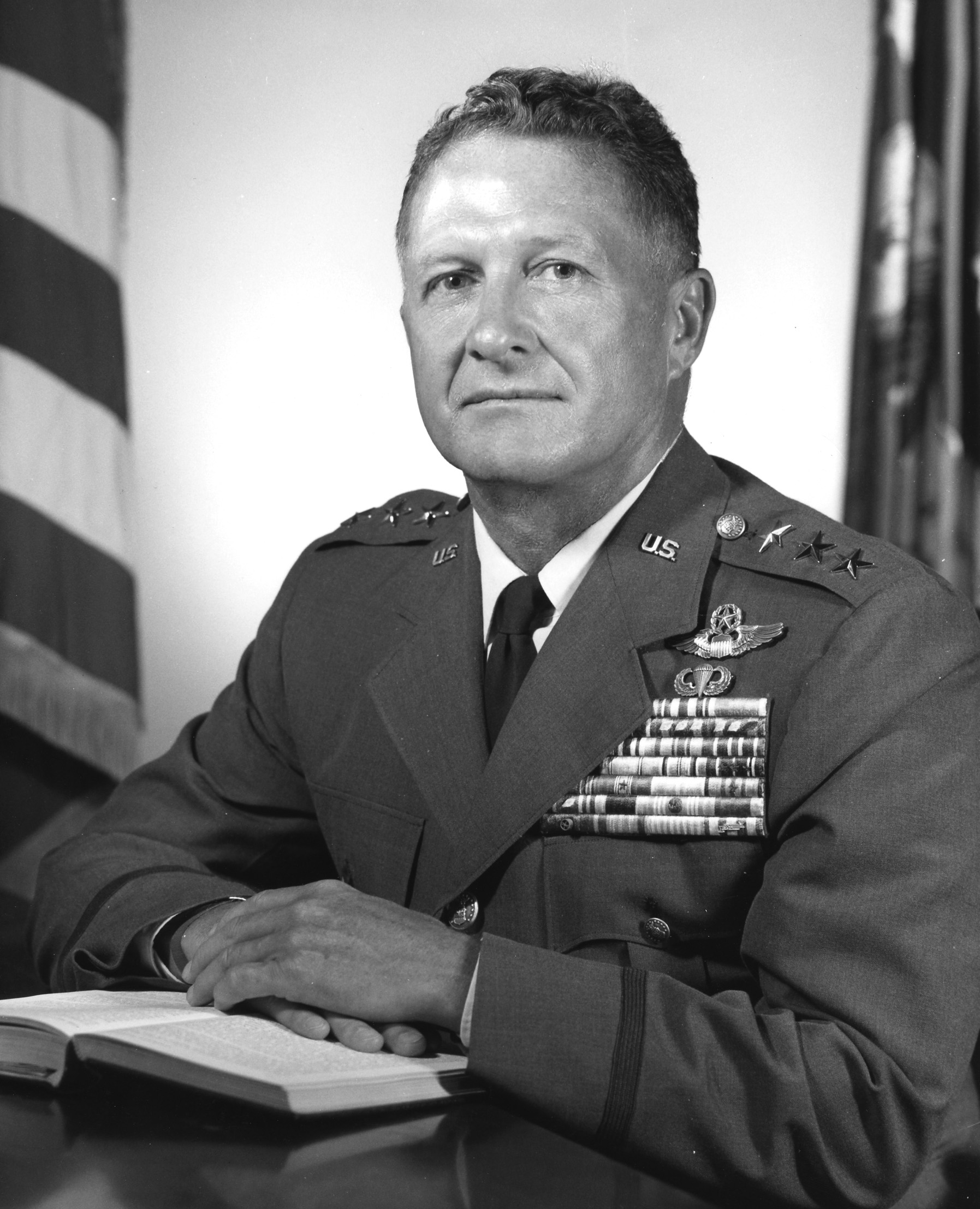
- Lieutenant General Gordon M. Graham
- Born: February 16, 1918; Ouray, Colorado
- Died: March 22, 2008 (aged 90); Irvington, Virginia
- Burial place: Arlington National Cemetery
- Military career
- Allegiance: United States
- Branch: United States Army Air Forces; United States Air Force
- Service years: 1940–1973
- Rank: Lieutenant General
- Nicknames: Ace; Gordy
- Unit: 355th Fighter Group
- Commands: 354th Fighter Squadron; 374th Fighter Squadron; 361st Fighter Group; 31st Strategic Fighter Wing; 4th Tactical Fighter Wing; Nineteenth Air Force; Seventh Air Force; Ninth Air Force; U.S. Forces Japan; Fifth Air Force; Sixth Allied Tactical Air Force
- Conflicts: World War II; Korean War; Vietnam War
- Awards: Air Force Distinguished Service Medal; Silver Star; Legion of Merit; Distinguished Flying Cross (2); Air Medal (30)
- Other work: Vice President, McDonnell Douglas (Far East Division) (1973–80); Vice President, McDonnell Douglas (Congressional Liaison) (1980–84)

Gordon Marion Graham (February 16, 1918 – March 22, 2008) was a United States Air Force lieutenant general. Graham was a combat pilot who, during World War II was credited with 7 aerial victories making him a flying ace. He is credited with a further 9.5 aircraft destroyed on the ground. By the end of World War II, Graham had flown 73 combat missions in the P-51 Mustang.

== Early life ==
Graham was born in Ouray, Colorado, in 1918. He attended Taft High School in Taft, California, and graduated from the University of California in 1940 with a Bachelor of Science degree in petroleum engineering.

== Military career ==
Graham began his military career in December 1940 as an aviation cadet and was commissioned as second lieutenant and received his pilot wings upon completion of flying school in August 1941.

After a series of assignments as gunnery instructor and instructor pilot at various bases. During World War II, Graham joined the 355th Fighter Group in the Eighth Air Force in Europe in August 1944, stationed at RAF Steeple Morden. He commanded the 354th Fighter Squadron from October 1944 until June 1945 when he was transferred to the 361st Fighter Group to command the 374th Fighter Squadron. He assumed command of the 361st Fighter Group in August 1945.

By the end of World War II in Europe, General Graham had flown 73 combat missions in North American P-51 Mustang fighter aircraft and had become an ace 7 enemy aircraft in aerial combat plus 9.5 more while strafing airfields, to his credit, while flying with the 355th Fighter Group. In addition, he had one probable and 10 damaged. He was assistant chief of staff for operations, VIII Fighter Command, from October 1945 until February 1946.

After four months as a civilian with the Socony Vacuum Company of Venezuela, he returned to active military duty with the U.S. Army Air Corps in September 1946 as deputy assistant for operations, Tenth Air Force, at Brooks Field. He later served as commander of Reserve training detachments at Brooks and Carswell fields, Texas.

In 1947, Graham entered the University of Pittsburgh under the Air Force Institute of Technology program, earning a Master of Science degree in 1948. In his next two assignments, General Graham was industrial mobilization training consultant to the Union Oil Company of California and the Shell Oil Company.

Between September 1949 and December 1954, Graham served as chief of the Target Analysis Division in the Office of the Director of Intelligence at Headquarters U.S. Air Force and then as director of targets in the Directorate of Intelligence, Headquarters Far East Air Forces in Japan, during the Korean War

Graham returned to the United States in January 1955 and served first as deputy commander and then from October 1955 as commander of the 31st Strategic Fighter Wing at Turner Air Force Base. As commander, he performed the navigation for his wing's lead element during "Operation Left Hook," a Strategic Air Command fighter wing bombing and navigation competition. The 31st Strategic Fighter Wing won the navigation and maintenance trophies and took second place honors among the seven wings entered in the competition.

Graham led a series of F-84 Thunderjet jet aircraft "Oil Burner" missions which demonstrated that nonstop air refueled, day and night long-range deployments in fighter aircraft were practical. In 1958 he led the first nonstop deployment of F-100 Super Sabre aircraft from the United States to Europe, and he was captain of the 31st Tactical Fighter Wing team which won the Tactical Air Command Fighter Weapons Meet and placed second in worldwide tactical fighter weapons competition.

In January 1959 he returned to Headquarters U.S. Air Force as chief of the Tactical Division and later was director of operational forces in the Directorate of Operations. In July 1962 he went to Seymour Johnson Air Force Base, to command the 4th Tactical Fighter Wing and in October 1963 was named vice commander of the Nineteenth Air Force. Graham moved to Langley Air Force Base, in November 1964 to become a member of the Headquarters Tactical Air Command staff. He served as Deputy for Operations from August 1965 to July 1966.

He next went to Southeast Asia and assignment as vice commander of the Seventh Air Force where he flew 146 combat missions in F-4 Phantom and RF-4 Phantom aircraft. He returned to the United States in August 1967 to become commander of the Ninth Air Force at Shaw Air Force Base. In August 1968 General Graham returned to Langley Air Force Base as vice commander of Tactical Air Command.

Graham was assigned as commander, U.S. Forces Japan, and commander, Fifth Air Force, with headquarters at Fuchu Air Station, in February 1970.

At the conclusion of this tour of duty, he was awarded the Order of the Sacred Treasure (First Class) by Japan and the Order of National Security Merit (Gug-Seon Medal) by the Republic of Korea. In November 1972 he was assigned to İzmir, Turkey, as commander, Sixth Allied Tactical Air Force.

Graham was a command pilot who, in accruing 9,000 flying hours, flew all of the U.S. Air Force century series jet fighters including the F-111A Aardvark and comparable U.S. Navy fighter aircraft such as the A-7 Corsair. He completed the U.S. Army Airborne Parachutist Course in 1962 and was jump qualified.

== Later life ==
Graham was a member of Tau Beta Pi, the national honorary engineering society; American Institute of Mining, Metallurgical and Petroleum Engineers; American Fighter Aces Association; Red River Valley Fighter Pilots Association; Order of Daedalians; Air Force Association; and a life member of the National Rifle Association of America.

Graham died on March 22, 2008, of a stroke at his home in Irvington, Virginia and is buried at Arlington National Cemetery.

== Awards and decorations ==
For his service in the Republic of Vietnam, Graham was awarded the Air Force Distinguished Service Medal. He has also earned the Silver Star; Legion of Merit; Distinguished Flying Cross with oak leaf cluster; Air Medal with 27 oak leaf clusters; Joint Service Commendation Medal; Air Force Commendation Medal; Republic of Korea Order of Military Merit; National Order of Vietnam (5th class); Vietnamese Air Force Distinguished Service Medal (1st class); the Vietnamese Armed Forces Honor Medal (1st class); Vietnamese Air Force Pilot Wings; Republic of Korea Air Force Pilot Wings; and Chinese Air Force Pilot Wings.

U.S. Air Force Command pilot badge
U.S. Air Force Parachutist Badge
Air Force Distinguished Service Medal
Silver Star
Legion of Merit
Distinguished Flying Cross with bronze oak leaf cluster
Air Medal with four silver oak leaf clusters
Air Medal with one silver and three bronze oak leaf clusters (second ribbon required for accouterment spacing)
Joint Service Commendation Medal
Air Force Commendation Medal
Air Force Presidential Unit Citation
Air Force Outstanding Unit Award
American Defense Service Medal
American Campaign Medal
European-African-Middle Eastern Campaign Medal with three bronze campaign stars
World War II Victory Medal
National Defense Service Medal with one service star
Korean Service Medal
Armed Forces Expeditionary Medal
Vietnam Service Medal with two bronze campaign stars
Air Force Longevity Service Award with one silver and three bronze oak leaf clusters
Small Arms Expert Marksmanship Ribbon
South Korean Order of National Security Merit (Gukseon Medal)
Japanese Order of the Sacred Treasure (1st class)
National Order of Vietnam (Knight)
Vietnam Air Force Distinguished Service Order (2nd class)
Vietnam Armed Forces Honor Medal (1st class)
Republic of Vietnam Gallantry Cross Unit Citation
United Nations Service Medal for Korea
Vietnam Campaign Medal
Korean War Service Medal

=== Silver Star citation ===
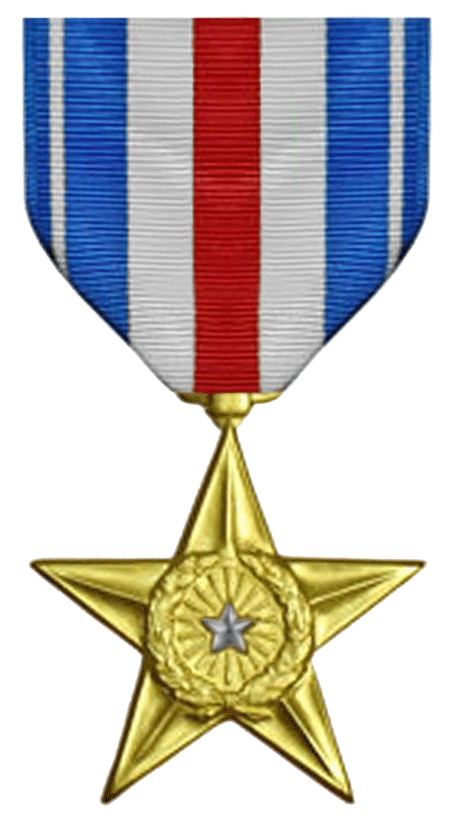

Graham, Gordon M.
Colonel, U.S. Army Air Forces
354th Fighter Squadron, 355th Fighter Group, Eighth Air Force
Date of Action: October 1944 to April 1945

Citation:

The President of the United States of America, authorized by Act of Congress July 9, 1918, takes pleasure in presenting the Silver Star to Colonel (Air Corps) Gordon Marion Graham, United States Army Air Forces, for gallantry in action as Pilot of a P-51 Fighter Airplane and Commander of the 354th Fighter Squadron, 355th Fighter Group, Eighth Air Force, in action from October 1944 to April 1945. To better equip himself for the responsibilities attendant to leading Fighter units in combat, Colonel Graham flew practically every position in the squadron formation. His willingness to share in the same risks and dangers as the other pilots quickly earned for him the respect and admiration of the entire unit. As proof of his combat skill, enthusiasm, and zealous fighting spirit, Colonel Graham can look with pride on his outstanding record of nine enemy planes destroyed between 8 April 1945 and 16 April 1945. Colonel Graham's earnest prosecution of the aerial offensive against the enemy during this period reflects great credit upon himself and the Armed Forces of the United States.
