= Target analysis =

Target analysis is an examination of potential targets to determine military importance, priority of attack, and weapons required to obtain a desired level of damage or casualties. The Central Intelligence Agency defines it as, "network analysis techniques and specialized analytical tools to identify and detail key figures and organizations who may pose a threat to US interests."

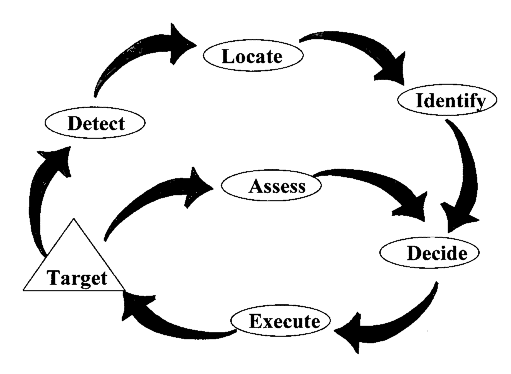
U.S. Air Force target analysis chart

== Roles of target analysts ==
=== Intelligence Community ===
The Central Intelligence Agency (CIA)'s Directorate of Intelligence (DI) is the most visible targeting analyst post in the Intelligence Community. The CIA identifies its Target Analyst position as one that analysts will “research, analyze, write, and brief using network analysis techniques and specialized tools to identify and detail key threats to the US. Targeting analysts regularly produce a range of current and longer-term intelligence products and provide analytic support to operations for key foreign and domestic policymakers, military officials, and intelligence and law enforcement agencies. Available targeting analyst positions focus on regions of the world and on functional topics including terrorism, weapons proliferation, narcotics trafficking, money laundering, and cyber threats.”

The U.S. Army's 35F position, or "Intelligence Analyst" provides most of the targeting analysis for the military. However, the Department of Defense also hires defense contractors to aid in targeting analysis, specifically during wartime.

=== Contractors ===
Target analysis contractors are hired by the U.S. government to fill temporary positions that it may be too inconvenient or costly to fill using current the intelligence community's resources. Some employees of such contractors are occasionally hired directly by a government intelligence agency to work directly for them if their work is well respected and a longer term need in that particular field is observed.

In a job posting by Science Application International Corporation (SAIC), they specify the role of the target analyst will, “serve as a team member in the C4 Systems and Networking Division at the Office of Naval Intelligence (ONI) in Suitland, Maryland. The analyst will conduct maritime C4 target intelligence analysis and reporting. Duties may include: researching, collating, reviewing, evaluating, and integrating data from multiple sources to develop intelligence and enter it into a database on a set schedule. Prepare analytical reports, briefs, databases, studies, advisories, estimates, and evaluations. Identify information gaps and develop collection requirements, analytical tools, and methodologies to fill these gaps. Topics include maritime C4ISR infrastructure.”

Other contractors that offer target analysis positions include Lockheed Martin, and Northrop Grumman.

== Goal of target analysis ==
=== Tactical ===
Using a combination HUMINT, SIGINT, MASINT, IMINT, and OSINT, analysts are able to identify immediate targets, such as terrorists or other military targets. This intelligence would then be passed on to the armed forces to take appropriate actions against. Many times targeting analysts working on tactical issues work in warzones either as contractors or military servicemen. Currently the focus of U.S. targeting analysts is identifying terrorists in and around Afghanistan.

=== Strategic ===
Like tactical analysis, target analysts combine all of the Intelligence "Ints" in order to provide decision makers with a long term forecast on arising issues and possible concerns. These area of concerns may consist of domestic or international terrorism, foreign conflicts, cyber crime, or many others. This type of analysis is done using structured and other advanced analytical techniques.

== See also ==
- Intelligence Analysis
- Military Intelligence
- Intelligence Cycle
- Central Intelligence Agency
