= Stuart A. Herrington =

US Army officer

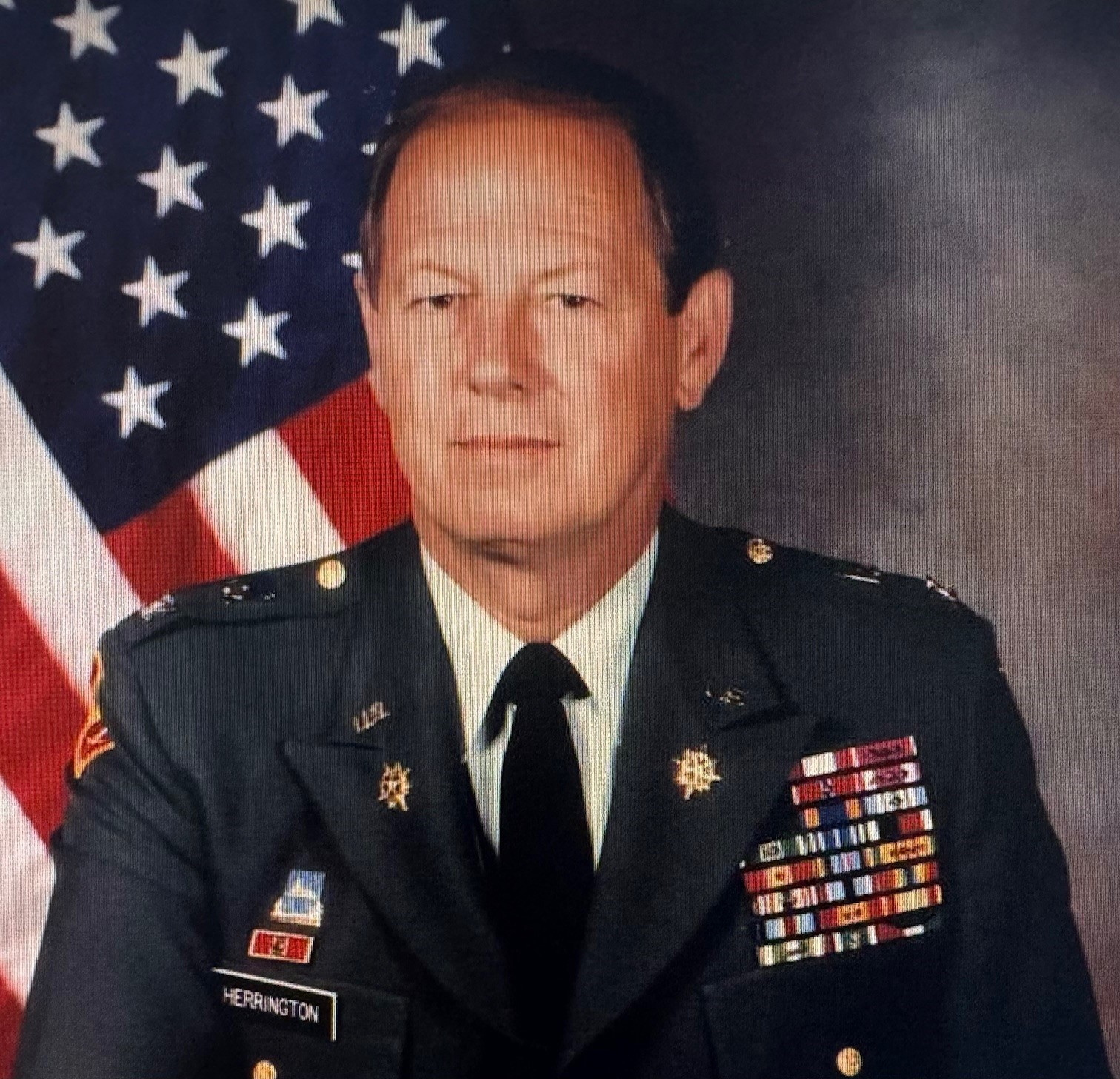

Stuart Arthur Herrington, Col, U.S. Army (Ret.) is an author and retired counterintelligence officer with extensive interrogation experience in three wars (Vietnam, Operation Just Cause, and Operation Desert Storm). Herrington's 2003 audit of interrogation practices by U.S. forces in Iraq, including conditions at the Abu Ghraib prison and other sites, prompted scrutiny of U.S. interrogation efforts in the War in Afghanistan (2001-2021), the Iraq War, and elsewhere.

For his experience in the Vietnam War, he was interviewed in Ken Burns's series about the war.

== Military and Intelligence Assignments ==
=== Vietnam ===
Herrington joined military intelligence in 1967 training at the US Army Intelligence School at Fort Holabird and then served in West Berlin for 2 years.

He then trained as a military adviser at Fort Bragg and spent 3 months learning Vietnamese at Fort Bliss before deploying to South Vietnam in March 1971 as an intelligence adviser in the Đức Huệ District of Hậu Nghĩa Province on the Cambodian border. In this role he took part in the Phoenix Program identifying and then capturing or killing Vietcong cadres. Herrington later wrote that he saw the waterboarding of a 19-year-old girl, and was shocked into a permanent aversion to torture as an interrogation technique.

Herrington then served at the Defense Attache Office in Saigon as an intelligence officer in the U.S. Delegation, Four Party Joint Military Team, which was charged by the terms of the Paris Peace Accords with obtaining information on the dead and missing from the war. At dawn, April 30, 1975, he was one of the last Americans to be evacuated from the roof of the US Embassy during the Fall of Saigon.

=== German and post Cold-War operations ===
Herrington spent six years during the 1980s in West Germany, culminating with a three-year tour as the Commander of the 766th MI Detachment, Army counterintelligence's unit in West Berlin. During his tenure, the Detachment scored a success against the Soviet KGB when three Soviet officers were detained while meeting with an American soldier they believed was a traitor.(Operation Lake Terrace) Transferring to Ft. Meade, Maryland in 1986, he continued his focus on counterintelligence, commanding three Intelligence & Security Command CI/Human Intelligence units there over a period of eight years. His most significant command challenge was as Director, U.S. Army Foreign Counterintelligence Activity (FCA), between January 1988 and May 1992. During his tenure as Director, FCA, the unit pursued and wrapped up two of the most sensitive and significant espionage cases in post WW II history.

In a global counterespionage case, FCA, working with the CIA, the FBI, Germany, and several foreign governments, successfully concluded the Clyde Lee Conrad espionage investigation, which involved the arrests and/or exposing of eleven participants in a spy ring that had been stealing war plans in Europe and selling them to the Czechs and the Hungarians, who provided them to the Soviet Union. Conrad, a retired Army NCO, was arrested in August 1988, and eventually given the first and only life sentence for espionage by the German government. Following the Conrad case, Herrington's FCA team successfully handled another sensitive investigation, resulting in the arrest and conviction of Warrant Officer James Hall, his Turkish courier, and four other co-conspirators, all of them soldiers or former soldiers.

During his service as Director, FCA, Herrington twice deployed to hostile contingencies, first in Panama (Just Cause-1989-90) and second to Saudi Arabia (Desert Storm). (1991). During both contingencies, Herrington constituted a team from FCA and other assets, then established and led sophisticated interrogation projects targeting high-value detainees from among the prisoner population. His account of these interrogation operations, which did not employ torture, brutality, or any of the "enhanced interrogation techniques" that became famous/infamous during the post-9-11 period, can be found in a major address Herrington delivered in 2009. In June 1992, after giving up command of FCA, Herrington established "Task Force Russia: POW/MIA" at the request of the Chief of Staff, Army, which supported an intensive probe into the fates of unaccounted for personnel from WW II, Korea, Cold War shootdowns, and Vietnam POW/MIA. Initially the TF Director, he became its deputy director when the Army determined that the highly charged nature of the POW/MIA hunt merited the assignment of a general officer as its director. From June 1992 to June 1993, Herrington and his TF Russia team reestablished the DoD's credibility in POW/MIA matters, and cemented cordial and respectful ties with the families of unaccounted for servicemembers.

== After Retirement ==
Herrington retired from the military in 1998 to become the director of global security and investigations for the Callaway Golf Company, protecting the golf company's intellectual property (anti-counterfeiting), and running its corporate security operations. In 2005, he was named "Corporate Security Director of the Year" by Access Control & Security Systems magazine.

In March 2002, he was requested by HQ, Department of the Army, to travel to Guantanamo, Cuba, to evaluate the interrogation operations of the reestablished Joint Task Force 160 of detainees seized during the United States invasion of Afghanistan and since. His report to the Task Force commander strongly recommended the adoption of sophisticated, developmental-based operations along the lines of earlier successful projects Herrington had undertaken in other contingencies. In December 2003, he again was asked by the Army to serve as a consultant, this time by traveling to Baghdad, Iraq to evaluate both interrogation operations and the conduct of Combined Joint Task Force 7 with respect to the growing insurgency. As in Guantanamo, Herrington's report was critical of the command's operations, and became controversial when it was leaked to the "Washington Post." In that report, Herrington criticized the command's interrogation practices, and pointed out that command operations, particularly "kinetic" operations in search of Saddam Hussein and insurgents, were counterproductive. In 2006, Herrington mentored a class of interrogators at Fort Bliss, Texas, on the use of non-abusive interrogation techniques. In 2004, he repeated this effort at Fort Lewis, Washington to the soldiers of the 502nd Military Intelligence Battalion, again rejecting brutality and stressing the effectiveness of legal, developmental-based interrogation practices.

== Opposition to Use of Force in Interrogations ==
In 2008, Herrington and other retired military intelligence officers called for a ban on waterboarding. Herrington discussed his opposition to Bush-era interrogation practices and his own philosophy of interrogation—a developmental, rapport-based effort—in several public articles and talks. One of his themes was that experienced, skilled interrogators almost unanimously reject the concept of using force and inflicting physical misery on detainees to obtain information. He and numerous other seasoned interrogators from the military, the FBI, and the CIA, collaborated with the organization, Human Rights First, to lobby in Washington on behalf of this philosophy and against "enhanced interrogation techniques," labeling them as ineffective, illegal, morally wrong, and a resort to "amateur hour" tactics.

== Publications ==
Silence Was A Weapon: The Vietnam War in the Villages, Presidio Press, 1982 (An account of the Vietnam War in Hau Nghia Province based upon the author's tour of duty between January 1971 and August 1972).

Peace with Honor? An American Reports on Vietnam, 1973-1975, Presidio Press, 1983 (Sequel to Silence Was A Weapon, an account of the cease-fire period ending with the evacuation of Saigon based on the author's tour of duty between Aug 1973 and April 1975) Out of Print

Stalking the Vietcong: Inside Operation Phoenix Presidio Press (trade paperback), 1997, A revised edition of Silence Was A Weapon containing formerly classified data not included in the original edition, out of print.

Stalking the Vietcong: Inside Operation Phoenix Ballantine Books-Random House (paperback), 2004, in print.

Traitors Among Us: Inside the Spy Catcher's World Presidio Press (hardbound, out of print), 2004; Same title, trade paperback, in print, Harvest Book, Harcourt, 2000.

A Tale of Two Families: A Genealogical Memoir of the Herrington Family Hardbound, Angel Printing, 2009 (not commercially available)

The Fight for the High Ground: The U.S. Army and Interrogation During Operation Iraqi Freedom, May 2003-April 2004 by Major Douglas A. Pryer, U.S. Army, CGSC Foundation Press, 2009, (Major Pryer's award-winning book, with a Foreword contributed by Colonel (retired) Stuart A. Herrington addressing the interrogation issues of the Bush Administration)

== See also ==
- Abu Ghraib prison
- Clyde Lee Conrad
- Guantanamo
- Task Force 121
- Waterboarding
