= Task Force 77 =

Task Force 77 may refer to:

- Task Force 77 (United States Navy), the main battle group of the U.S. Navy Seventh Fleet
- Task Force 77, formerly known as Task Force 145, a multi-national force of US and UK troops in Iraq
