= No blood, no foul =

Rule that limited violence is acceptable

The phrase No Blood, No Foul insinuates that as long as violence does not leave a mark, it is not prosecutable. The phrase has been used euphemistically in the context of the game streetball, the use of surreptitious abuse at the Iraqi military base Camp Nama, the use of physical and psychological torture more broadly, and acts of medical malpractice.

== Streetball origins ==
The phrase "No Blood, No Foul" is commonly used in Streetball. Streetball is a version of Basketball played in the streets. It typically has fewer rules, no referee, and is generally rougher than basketball. "Within the context of sport, aggressive acts are often viewed as instrumentally useful to the initiator and are consequently likely to be valued". In regular basketball, the National Basketball Association defines a foul by saying, "A player shall not hold, push, charge into, impede the progress of an opponent by extending a hand, forearm, leg or knee or by bending the body into a position that is not normal. Contact that results in the re-routing of an opponent is a foul which must be called immediately". In Streetball, pushing and shoving is acceptable provided no serious damage (typically drawing blood) is done. Hence the phrase "No Blood, No Foul".

== Camp Nama sign ==
In Camp Nama a sign was posted that read, "No Blood, No Foul: The High Five Paintball Club". "One Defense Department specialist recalled seeing pink blotches on detainees' clothing as well as red welts on their bodies, marks he learned later were inflicted by soldiers who used detainees as targets and called themselves the High Five Paintball Club". The phrase "No Blood, No Foul" grew to sum up the entire camp as it was posted around the camp and torture chambers. An official of the Defense Department explained the slogan by saying," [it] reflected an adage adopted by Task Force 6-26: "If you don't make them bleed, they can't prosecute for it." or in other words "torture that leaves no scars is hard to prove".

== Torture Memos ==
Much of the recent history of the "No Blood, No Foul" policy was shaped by the so-called Torture Memos (also called the Bybee-Yoo memorandum). The Torture Memos were written in the wake of the attack on 9/11. They detail approved interrogation techniques by evaluating proposed techniques in terms of International Statutes. They give approval to techniques such as walling (shoving a prisoner into a false flexible wall in order to disorient them), sleep deprivation, putting a benign insect in the prisoners box while telling them it is a stinging insect, the use of stress positions, and water boarding. They are evaluated to be legal and not constitute torture because they do not cause severe physical or mental pain or suffering (Bybee). "The Bybee Memorandum which was widely used as a legal basis for far-reaching interrogation methods explicitly authorized against terrorist suspects, concluded by stating that 'even if an interrogation method might violate Section 2340A, necessity or self-defense could provide justifications that would eliminate any criminal liability". Because of these memos it has been said that the "No Blood, No Foul" policy evolved from the White House and Pentagon, "'No blood, no foul,' [was] the punch line that the Defense Department drew from the Bybee-Yoo memorandum".

== Extending to doctors ==
The philosophy has been extended to physicians as well in two notable areas: torture and malpractice.

=== Torture ===
Torture (in the context of interrogation) has been defined as, "Physically and/or psychologically painful methods designed to elicit information from an individual". "With respect to the last few decades, increasing evidence indicates that doctors are frequently involved when torture is carried out". Physicians aided the military in its torture of prisoners in Camp Nama when the phrase was applied to them. The Secretary of U.S. Torture policy said, " The use of isolation as an interrogation technique requires detailed implementation instructions ... including medical and psychological review ... including the presence or availability of qualified medical personnel.".

In Guantanamo, "doctors were made to agree to torture in advance and to live by the motto: "No blood, no foul." They practiced the art of sleep deprivation, hypothermia, withholding food and treatment of injuries, among other abuses". In the interrogation log for Mohammed al-Qhatani it is revealed that, "doctors were present during the long process of constant sleep deprivation over 55 days, and they induced hypothermia and the use of threatening dogs, among other techniques".

Physician's and Psychologist's use of the "No Blood, No Foul" policy to get around their Hippocratic oaths have sparked controversy, "It is unthinkable that any psychologist could assert that stress positions, forced nudity, sleep deprivation, exploiting phobias, and waterboarding — along with other forms of torture techniques that the American Psychological Association has condemned and prohibited — cause no lasting damage to a human being's psyche". "The American Psychiatric Association and the American Psychological Association adopted Position Statements absolutely prohibiting their members from participating in torture under any and all circumstances, and, to a limited degree, forbidding involvement in interrogations".

=== Malpractice ===
The use of the "No Blood, No Foul" policy has been extended to medical malpractice. The Improve Patient Safety Summit 2001 established that in medicine the "No Blood, No Foul" philosophy, "assumes no harm has been done if a patient is not injured.". Dr. Bagian, director of the National Center for Patient Safety at the VA, said about the "No Blood, No Foul Policy", "That's true for tort, if you don't hurt people, you don't have to pay".
