= Task Force 6-26 =

United States joint military/government agency

Task Force 6–26 was a United States military task force originally set-up to find "high-value targets" (HVTs) in Iraq in the aftermath of Operation Iraqi Freedom. The main objective of Task Force 6–26 was the capture or liquidation of terror leader Abu Musab al-Zarqawi, who led al-Qaeda in Iraq. The unit was made up of U.S. special operations forces including Delta Force, DEVGRU, 24th Special Tactics Squadron and the 75th Ranger Regiment along with the CIA's Special Activities Center. Other military and DIA personnel are believed to have been involved as 'limited' members of the unit, along with FBI agents.

Members of 6–26 had fanned out in areas ranging from Baghdad, Mosul and to Fallujah and other areas in the contested Al Anbar province in search of al-Zarqawi, and had been very successful in eliminating many leaders of his group, and killing al-Zarqawi on 7 June 2006.

The unit operated an interrogation cell at Camp Nama, one of Saddam Hussein's former military bases near Baghdad. There, American soldiers made one of the former Iraqi government's interrogation facilities into one of their own, calling it "The Black Room." In 2004 it was reported that the force was running a secret prison in Baghdad and abusing prisoners; the unit was implicated in two prisoner deaths.

== See also ==
- Task Force 121
- Task Force 145
- Task Force ODIN
- U.S. list of 55 most-wanted Iraqis
- Iraqi insurgency (2003–2011)
- Assassination and targeted killing by the CIA
