= High-value target =

United States military terminology

In United States military terminology, high-value target (HVT) is the term used to describe a person or resource which an enemy commander can least afford to lose. The term has been widely used in the news media for Osama bin Laden and high-ranking officers of al-Qaeda and other terrorist organizations. Former Iraqi president Saddam Hussein was known as High-Value Target Number One by the United States military before his capture. The term was also used to refer to former Venezuelan president, Nicolás Maduro, who was captured as part of Operation Absolute Resolve.

High-value individual (HVI) can be used if the target is a person. High-value airborne asset (HVAA) may be utilized when referring to aircraft. A high-payoff target (HPT), is a high-value target whose loss to the enemy will significantly contribute to the success of a friendly course of action.

Various Joint Special Operations Task Forces (Task Force 145, Task Force 121, Task Force 11, Task Force 6-26) have been established for the main purposes of capturing or killing targets judged to be vital to an enemy's chances for success. Forces assigned to these include units mainly from the Joint Special Operations Command and SOCOM such as the US Navy SEALs, US Army Delta Force, US Navy SEAL Team Six, US Army 75th Ranger Regiment and elements of the British Army's Special Air Service (SAS). The term has also become associated with secret US Department of Defense programs to capture and subsequently interrogate terrorist leaders.

== See also ==
- High-value detention site
- List of assassinations by the United States
- Joint Special Operations Command Task Force in the Iraq War
- Manhunt (military)
- Operation Red Dawn
- USA kill or capture strategy in Iraq
- U.S. list of most-wanted Iraqis
- Ayman al-Zawahiri
