= 502nd Military Intelligence Battalion =

The 502nd Military Intelligence Battalion is a military intelligence unit of the United States Army.

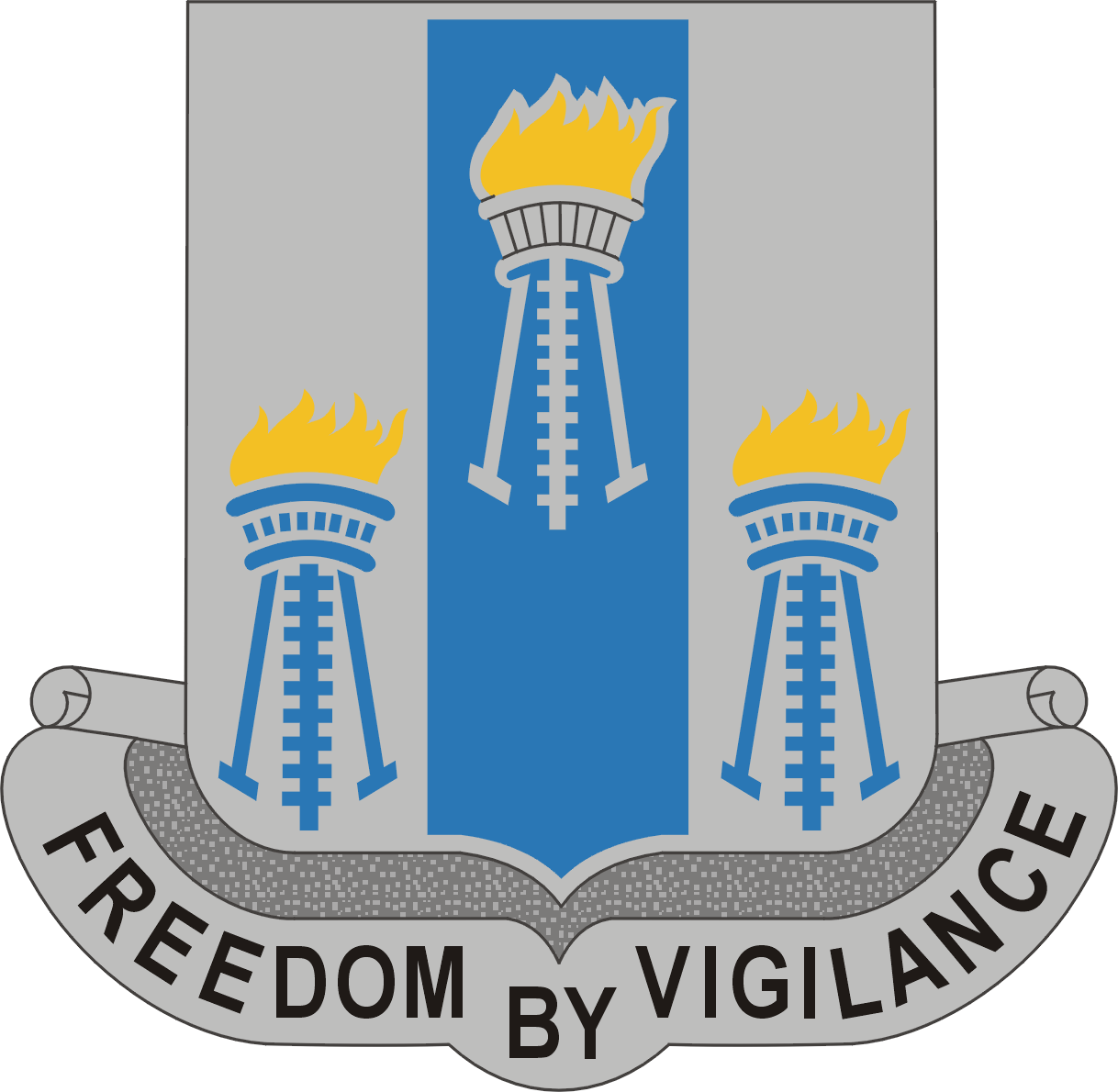
Distinctive unit insignia of the 502nd MI Battalion.

Organisation of the 201st Military Intelligence Brigade, including the 502nd MI Battalion.

== Mission ==
The 502nd Military Intelligence Battalion conducts multi-disciplined collection and analysis in support of tactical, operational and strategic– level commanders across the full spectrum of military operations.

== History ==
The 502nd Military Intelligence Battalion (MI BN) was officially constituted on 31 June 1952 in the Regular Army as Headquarters, 502nd Military Intelligence Service Battalion and was later activated on 1 September 1952 in Taegu, Korea.

During the Korean War, the battalion directly participated in three major campaigns: Summer-Fall 1952; the Third Korean Winter; and Summer 1953. As a result of its work, the battalion was awarded the Meritorious Unit Commendation and the Republic of Korea Presidential Unit Citation. Eighteen months after open hostilities drew to a close, the battalion was deactivated in Korea on 20 January 1955. During the war, the battalion also reorganized and on 28 March 1954 it was re-designated as Headquarters, 502nd Military Intelligence Battalion.

Six years later, on 25 March 1961, the 502nd MI BN was reactivated again in Korea; this time in Yongsan. Assigned to US Army Pacific Command, the battalion served as a field army battalion assigned to Eighth US Army. Between 1961 and 1978, the 502nd MI BN was the only military intelligence battalion serving in the Republic of Korea. Throughout this time frame, the battalion provided key analytical research on the development of the North Korean Army. In April 1977, the battalion was reorganized and reassigned from US Army Pacific and Eighth US Army to the newly formed Intelligence and Security Command (INSCOM). On 1 January 1978, the 502nd MI BN was again deactivated.

Nearly a decade later, on 1 October 1986, the 502nd MI BN was reactivated again, but this time at Fort Lewis, Washington. Rather than reactivating under INSCOM, it was assigned under the 35th Air Defense Artillery Brigade. Less than a year later, on 16 July 1987, it was reorganized and consisted at that time of a Headquarters and Headquarters Service Company (HHSC), and Intelligence Operations Company, and a Technical Analysis and Production Company. On 1 September 1987, the 502nd was reassigned from the 35th ADA Brigade to the newly activated 201st Military Intelligence Brigade, I (US) Corps, as its Operations Battalion, part of US Army Forces Command (FORSCOM).

On 15 January 2004, after the completion of the initial invasion of Iraq, the 502nd MI BN deployed in support of Operation Iraqi Freedom II, making this its first combat campaign in 52 years. Upon arrival in Baghdad, Iraq, the battalion reorganized with some additions as Task Force Rainier. This battalion task force provided critical mission command for Tactical Human Intelligence Teams operating throughout Iraq in support of Multinational Force-Iraq (MNF-I) and Multinational Corps-Iraq (MNC-I). The battalion returned to Fort Lewis in December 2004.

On 11 August 2006, the 502nd MI BN deployed again to Iraq, this time in support of Operation Iraqi Freedom 06–08. Organized into Human Intelligence Collection Teams and Triton Collection Teams (Signal Intelligence), the battalion operated throughout the greater Baghdad area and, Central and Southern Iraq, supporting the operations of MNF-I, MNC-I and four Multinational Divisions (Baghdad, Central, Central South, and South East). The battalion returned to Fort Lewis in October 2007, having served 15 months supporting the OIF campaign.

On 14 March 2008, the 502nd held its last formation as an Operations Battalion. The 201st Military Intelligence Brigade was re-designated as a Battlefield Surveillance Brigade (BfSB), transforming the 502nd into a collections battalion serving alongside its sister collections battalion - the 109th Military Intelligence Battalion. On 27 August 2009, the Battalion again deployed to Operation Iraqi Freedom as part of the 201st BfSB and returned to Fort Lewis on 20 August 2010.

== Campaign participation credit ==
=== Korean War ===
- Korea, Summer-Fall 1952
- Third Korean Winter
- Korea, Summer 1953

=== War on Terrorism Iraq ===
- Transition of Iraq, 2004
- Iraqi Governance, 2004
- Iraqi Surge, 2007
- National Resolution, 2007
- Iraqi Sovereignty, 2009-2010

The 502nd MI BN took part in a deployment to Afghanistan in 2012 and is involved in current operations.

== Awards ==
- Meritorious Unit Commendation (Army) for KOREA 1952-1954
- Republic of Korea Presidential Unit Citation for KOREA 1952-1953
- Meritorious Unit Commendation (Army) for IRAQ 2004>
- Meritorious Unit Commendation (Army) for IRAQ 2006-2007
- Meritorious Unit Commendation (Army) for IRAQ 2009-2010
