= 201st Expeditionary Military Intelligence Brigade =

- 201st Expeditionary Military Intelligence Brigade shoulder sleeve insignia
- Active: 1942–46; 1950–55; 1959–71; 1987 – present
- Country: United States
- Branch: (United States Army) U.S. Army
- Type: Military Intelligence
- Role: Provide intelligence analysis and collection support to I Corps
- Part of: I Corps
- Garrison/HQ: Joint Base Lewis-McChord Washington
- Mottos: "With Courage and Vision"
- Engagements: World War II; Korean War; Operation Iraqi Freedom (Operation Enduring Freedom)
- Decorations: Meritorious Unit Commendation Meritorious Unit Commendation Meritorious Unit Commendation Presidential Unit Citation (Philippines) Asiatic-Pacific Campaign Korean War Campaign Streamer Iraq Campaign Streamer Afghanistan Campaign Streamer

Commanders
- Commanding officer: COL David Hazelton
- Command Sergeant Major: CSM Richard Hostrop

Insignia
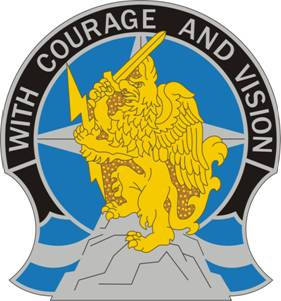
- Distinctive unit insignia of the brigade

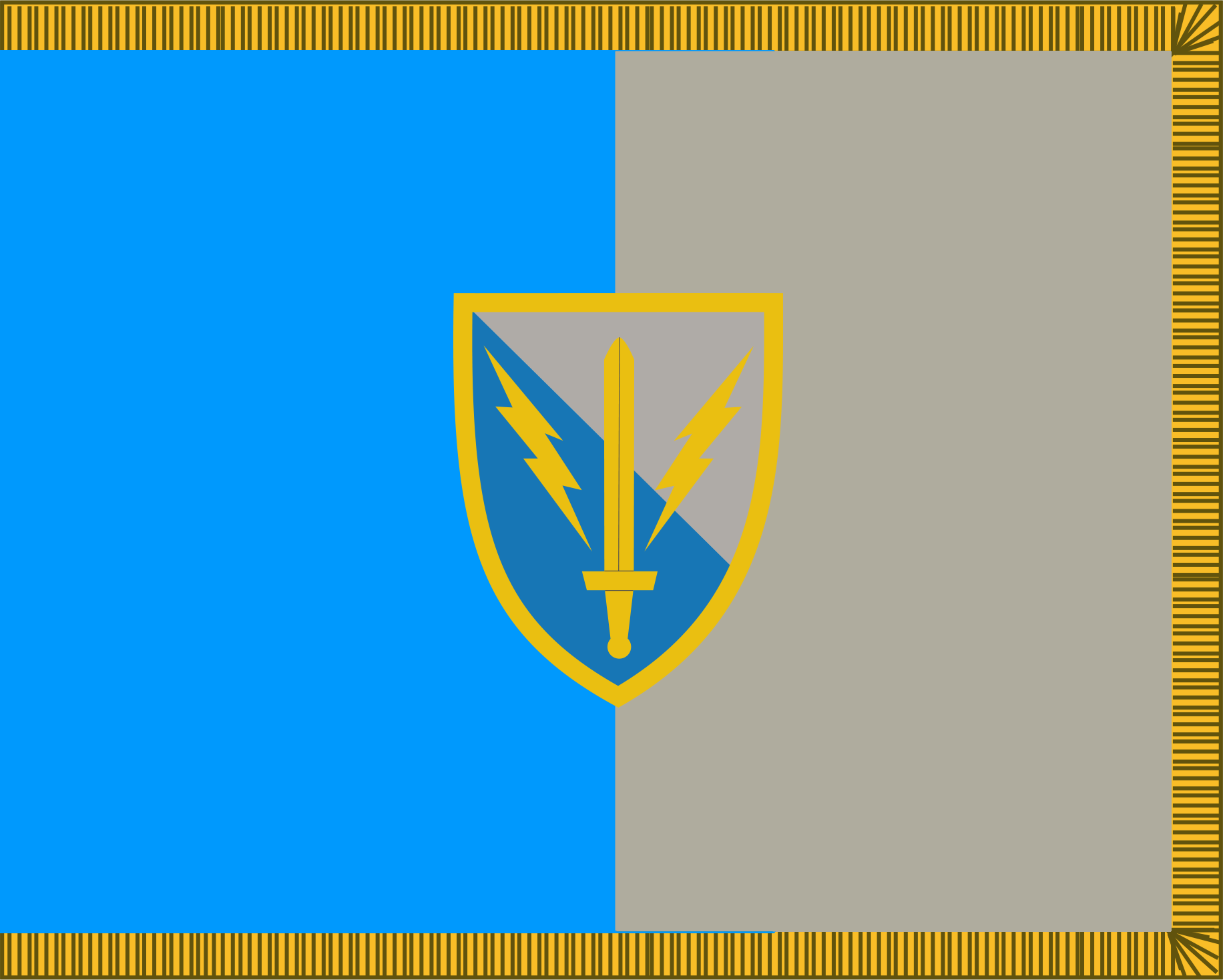
- 201st Military Intelligence Brigade Flag

The 201st Expeditionary Military Intelligence Brigade is located at Joint Base Lewis-McChord, Washington. The 201st was originally named the 201st Military Intelligence Brigade and on 3 July 2008 it became the Army's third active duty battlefield surveillance brigade and was renamed the 201st Battlefield Surveillance Brigade (BfSB). The US Army reorganized BfSBs and the 201st was realigned into a new expeditionary military intelligence brigade.

The 201st MI currently consists of one Intelligence Electronic Warfare Battalion (IEW BN), and a (Headquarters and Headquarters Company) (HHC).

== Mission ==
The 201st Expeditionary Military Intelligence Brigade provides deployable all-source intelligence analysis, human intelligence (humint), electronic warfare intelligence, reconnaissance and surveillance, target acquisition, battle damage assessment, command and control warfare, and broad bandwidth communications support to I Corps.

== History ==
=== Heritage ===
The 201st Expeditionary Military Intelligence Brigade was created from the merger of two separate units; Headquarters and Headquarters Company, 503rd Army Security Agency Group, and the 201st Counter Intelligence Detachment.

=== 503rd Army Security Group ===
The HHC, 503rd Army Security Group was constituted as the 323rd Signal Company, on 23 July 1942 and activated in Miami, Florida on 1 September 1942. While stationed on the Marshall Island during World War II, the company supported Army Air Corps units in the Pacific Theater. The company was inactivated on 17 October 1946 at Andrews Field, Camp Springs, Maryland.

After being brought back to service again, the company was redesignated 6 September 1950 as the 323d Signal Radio Intelligence Company, and allotted to the Organized Reserve Corps until the company was again activated 2 October 1950 at Fort Myer, Virginia. On 3 January 1951, the company was converted and redesignated as Headquarters and Headquarters Company, 601st Communications Reconnaissance Group. On 5 February 1951 the company was redesignated as Headquarters and Headquarters Company, 503rd Communications Group. The 503rd was again activated on 1 May of the same year.

=== 201st Counter Intelligence Detachment ===
The 201st Military Intelligence Detachment was constituted on 12 July 1944 as the 201st Counter Intelligence Corps Detachment. The detachment was activated on 20 August 1944 in New Guinea, and while in the Southwest Pacific area, attached to I Corps and supported the Corps through campaigns in New Guinea, and the Philippines. The detachment was inactivated on 25 February 1946 in Japan.

On 6 October 1950, the detachment was activated in Korea and assigned to the United States Army Forces, Far East and Eighth US Army participating in operations throughout Korea during the Korean War. The detachment was inactivated on 21 February 1955 in Korea. Allotted 20 March 1956 to the Regular Army, the unit activated 12 June of that year in Korea. After again being reorganized and redesignated 15 May 1959 becoming the 201st Military Intelligence Detachment, only to be inactivated the following month on 27 June 1959 in Washington, D.C.

=== Merger ===
The lineage of Headquarters and Headquarters Company, 503rd Army Security Agency Group, and 201st Military Intelligence Detachment merged on 1 September 1987. Headquarters and Headquarters Company, 503rd Army Security Agency Group was withdrawn from the Army Reserve and allotted to the Regular Army. The company was consolidated with the 201st Military Intelligence Brigade. The new unit was activated on the same day at Fort Lewis, Washington and consisted of the following units:

- 201st Military Intelligence Brigade, Fort Lewis, Washington
  - Headquarters and Headquarters Detachment
  - 14th Military Intelligence Battalion (Tactical Exploitation), Fort Lewis
  - 502nd Military Intelligence Battalion (Operations), Fort Lewis
  - 641st Military Intelligence Battalion (Aerial Exploitation), Salem, Oregon (Oregon Army National Guard)

=== BfSB Transformation ===
On 3 July 2008, the 201st Military Intelligence Brigade transformed into the 201st Battlefield Surveillance Brigade on Watkins Parade Field at Fort Lewis. The 201st BfSB was the third active-duty surveillance brigade in the Army today, following the 525th Battlefield Surveillance Brigade from Fort Bragg, North Carolina, and the 504th Battlefield Surveillance Brigade, which was stood up a year prior at Fort Hood, Texas.

The former MI brigade, which included reservists, and National Guardsmen, as well as active-duty soldiers, transformed into the 201st BfSB within a year. Broadening its reconnaissance mission to include surveillance and target acquisition with the addition of a long-range surveillance company – C Troop, 38th Cavalry, the 63rd Network Support Company, and the 602nd Forward Support Company. This however, was no easy task. The brigade stand-up required an almost total overhaul, complete with equipment, vehicles, amended missions and hundreds of new active-duty soldiers. Three hundred forty-five "whirlwind days" of preparation ended 23 Sep when the 201st Battlefield Surveillance Brigade, with its subordinate battalions, cased their colors for deployment to Operation Iraqi Freedom.

The changes made were all part of an Army-wide transition to the Army Modular Force, future-concept ("Grow The Army Plan" of modernization) proposed by US Army Chief of Staff General Peter Schoomaker in 2007. The plan calls for eleven Surveillance Brigades, seven of which are designated to Army National Guard: the 58th BfSB from Maryland, the 67th BFSB from Nebraska, the 71st BfSB from Texas, the 142nd BfSB from Alabama, the 219th BfSB from Indiana, the 297th BfSB from Alaska, and the 560th BfSB from Georgia, all of which are moving to the objective designs by the scheduled completion of the Grow The Army Plan by fiscal year 2013.

The 109th Military Intelligence Battalion activated in October 2008 to resume its 25-year-old legacy at Fort Lewis as formerly the 9th Infantry Division's primary intelligence-gathering arm.

The 502d Military Intelligence Battalion went through a transformation of its own to conform to the collection needs of the newly modular, self-sufficient brigade.

Troop C (LRS), 38th Cavalry Regiment was later reorganized and redesignated as Headquarters and Headquarters Troop (HHT), 3d Squadron, 38th Cavalry Regiment. The squadron included Troops A and B (ground troops) and Troop C (LRS), which was formed from the assets of the existing C-38th Cavalry Regiment. A subsequent force reorganization inactivated all LRS units, both in the active Army and the Army National Guard, to include all elements of the 38th Cavalry Regiment.

The brigade was home to nearly 1,000 service men and women. The brigade and its organic intelligence systems played a major role in the Army's Transformation Project that took shape at Joint Base Lewis-McChord. This transformation included another overhaul of the current structure to the reconnaissance, surveillance, and target acquisition (RSTA) format.

=== EMIB transformation ===
Along with the other two FORSCOM Intelligence Brigades (the 504th and 525th), the 201st BfSB further transformed into the 201st Expeditionary Military Intelligence Brigade (EMIB), consisting of the 109th E-MI BN and the 502nd E-MI BN (the LRS elements were cut in this transformation). The BDE now consists of approximately 650 Soldiers between the two line BNs and HHC BDE.

== Insignia ==
- Shoulder sleeve insignia

Oriental blue and silver gray are the Military Intelligence branch colors. The two parts symbolize the responsibility for acquisition and processing of tactical and strategic intelligence. The sword symbolizes the aggressiveness, and physical danger inherent in Military Intelligence operations. The lightning bolts refer to the electronic warfare capabilities of the unit and the commander's need for accurate and ready intelligence from all sources.

Background:

The shoulder sleeve insignia was originally approved for the 201st Military Intelligence Brigade on 29 April 1987. It was redesignated effective 16 October 2008, for the 201st Battlefield Surveillance Brigade with the description updated. (TIOH Dwg. No. A-1-733)

- Distinctive unit insignia

Oriental blue and silver gray are the colors associated with the Military Intelligence branch. Black denotes secrecy. The blue disc superimposed by the silver polestar symbolizes the world and the far reaching capabilities of the unit. The blue and silver wavy bars allude to World War II campaign participation in the Pacific. The silver mountain peak is representative of the Korean campaigns. The griffin, having the keen eyesight of an eagle and the strength and courage of a lion, indicates the attributes of Military intelligence and also alludes to the motto "With Courage and Vision". The lightning flash is indicative of communications, electronic warfare capabilities and the origin of the unit as a signal unit.

Background:

The distinctive unit insignia was originally approved for the 201st Military Intelligence Brigade on 29 April 1987. It was redesignated effective 16 October 2008, for the 201st Battlefield Surveillance Brigade with the description updated.

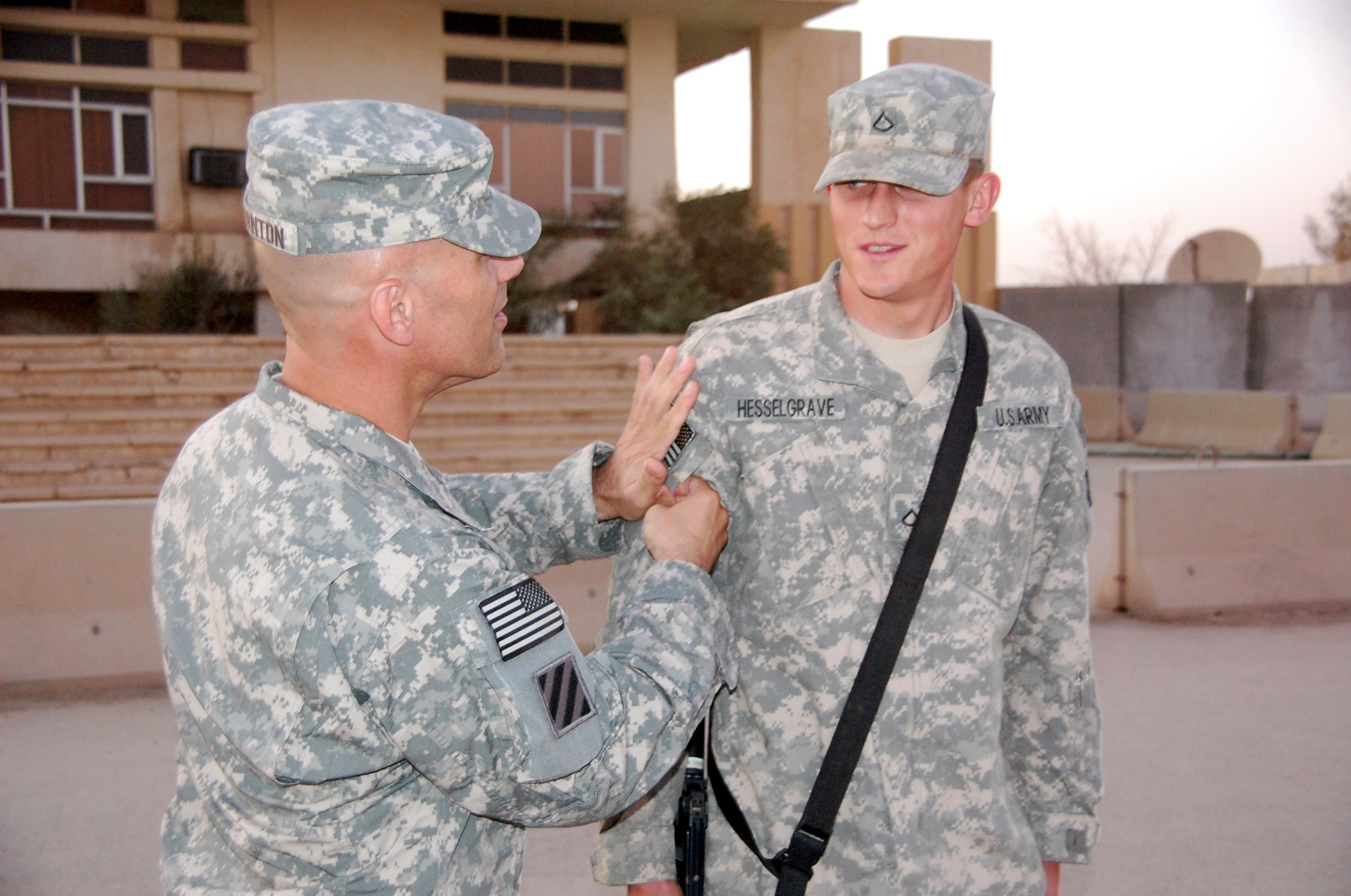
On Veterans Day 2009, soldiers of the 201st BfSB from Joint Base Lewis-McChord, Washington, earned the privilege of wearing the unit's patch on their right arm during a ceremony at Contingency Operating Base Adder in Tallil, Iraq.

== Decorations ==
=== Unit awards ===
- Meritorious Unit Commendation (streamers embroidered Pacific Theater, Korea 1953, and Iraq 2009–2010)
- Philippine Presidential Unit Citation (streamer embroidered 17 October 1944 – 4 July 1953)

=== Campaigns ===
- World War II (Antisubmarine, New Guinea, Western Pacific, Luzon)
- Korean War (UN Offensive, CCF Intervention, First UN Counteroffensive, CCF Spring Offensive, UN Summer-Fall Offensive, Second Winter, Summer-Fall 1952, Third Winter, Summer 1953)
- Operation Iraqi Freedom (Iraqi Sovereignty and Operation New Dawn)
- Operation Enduring Freedom (Afghanistan Campaign Medal) (May 2012 – Feb 2013 and again in 2014–2015 and Sep 2019-Jun 2020)

== Structure ==
The 201st Expeditionary Military Intelligence Brigade improves situational awareness for commanders at division or higher so they can focus joint combat power in current operations while simultaneously preparing for future operations. The units have the tools to respond to the commanders need from unmanned aerial vehicles to signals gathering equipment and human intelligence collectors.

Each expeditionary intelligence brigade consists of a headquarters and headquarters company (HHC). Active units have two military intelligence battalions, while the Army National Guard brigades have one. The brigades also have a signal company and a forward support company.

The 201st Expeditionary Military Intelligence Brigade currently consists of two Military Intelligence battalions (MI BNs), One deactivated Forward Support Company, One deactivated Network Support Company and a Headquarters and Headquarters Company (HHC).

=== Subordinate units ===
Component	DUI	Branch
Headquarters and Headquarters Company (HHC)		Military Intelligence
109th Military Intelligence Battalion (109th MIB); 502nd Military Intelligence Battalion (502nd MIB)		Military Intelligence

== See also ==
- Transformation of the United States Army
- Combat support
- Military Intelligence Corps
- 502nd MI Unit History
- 109th MI Unit History
