= Kelly Warren =

US Army private convicted in 1999 of espionage

Kelly Therese Warren (born 1966 in Warner Robins, Georgia) is a former private in the United States Army who was convicted of espionage.

Warren worked as a clerk at the 8th Infantry Division's headquarters in Bad Kreuznach, West Germany from 1986 to 1988. While there, it has been stated that Clyde Lee Conrad paid Warren to be allowed access to the secret documents, notably response plans for a Soviet invasion of Western Europe, but Sergeant First Class Conrad who served as the Division's G2 or Intelligence Non-commissioned Officer, already had access to these General Defense Plans (GDP). These plans were later sold to Hungarian intelligence officials.

In 1997, Warren was arrested and charged with conspiracy to commit espionage. In 1999, she was convicted and subsequently sentenced to 25 years in prison.

Conrad was jailed for life in Germany in 1990, and died in prison in 1998. Kelly Therese Warren was released from federal prison in 2011.
