= James Hickey (soldier) =

US Army officer

James B. Hickey
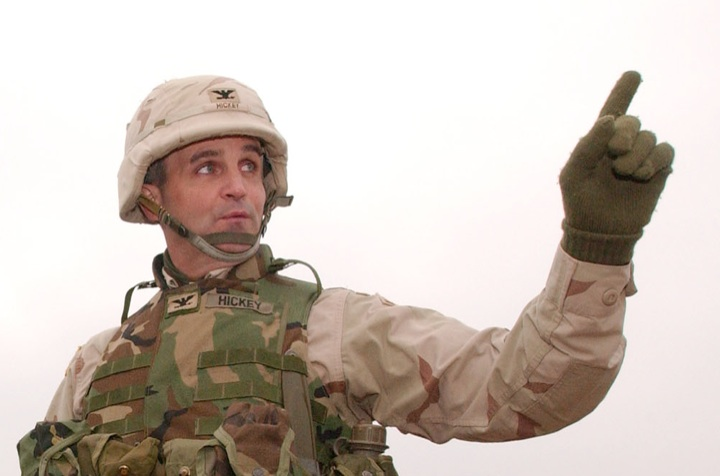
- Colonel James Hickey, explaining Operation Red Dawn to reporters near Tikrit, Iraq, December 2003.
- Born: October 1, 1960 (age 66); Chicago, Illinois
- Alma mater: Virginia Military Institute
- Spouse: Maureen Kelly (m. 1983)
- Military career
- Allegiance: United States of America
- Branch: United States Army
- Service years: 1982–2011
- Rank: Colonel
- Unit: [4th ID & 11th ACR]
- Commands: 1st Bde, 4th ID- 2/3 ACR
- Conflicts: Iraq War; Operation Red Dawn
- Awards: Silver Star

James B. Hickey (born October 1, 1960) is a retired U.S. Army colonel. In December 2003, he led Operation Red Dawn, the U.S. military effort that captured Saddam Hussein near Tikrit, Iraq.

== Military career ==
Hickey attended St. Laurence High School in Burbank, Illinois, and is a 1982 graduate of the Virginia Military Institute. On December 13, 2003, Colonel Hickey led the raid entitled "Operation Red Dawn" that captured Saddam Hussein in Tikrit, Iraq.

After graduating from the Virginia Military Institute, Hickey was commissioned into the U.S. Army in 1982.

His first assignment was with the 3rd Squadron, 7th Cavalry in Schweinfurt, Germany, where he served as a cavalry platoon leader, troop executive officer and squadron adjutant from 1982 to 1985. Then-Captain Hickey attended the Infantry Officer's Advance Course at Fort Benning, Georgia, and then returned to Germany in 1986. Thereafter he took command of L Troop, 3rd Squadron, 11th Armored Cavalry Regiment "Blackhorse" in Bad Hersfeld.

After command, Captain Hickey's next assignments were part of his secondary career field, Foreign Area Officer (Russian linguist) and included the Defense Language Institute in Monterey, California, the Johns Hopkins University School of Advanced International Studies (master's of international public policy) and the U.S. Army's Russian Institute in Garmisch, Germany.

Lieutenant Colonel Hickey was selected to command 2nd Squadron, 3rd Armored Cavalry Regiment in 1999 at Fort Carson, Colorado, after four years at the Army's premier combat training center at Fort Irwin, California. Lieutenant Colonel Hickey commanded the squadron through operational and training deployments in Bosnia-Herzegovina and the U.S. Army's most challenging combined arms training centers.

In April 2003, after attending Georgetown University as a U.S. Army Senior Service College Fellow, Colonel Hickey deployed to Iraq to work at the Headquarters of the 4th Infantry Division during Operation Iraqi Freedom.

On June 13, 2003 he took command of 1st Brigade, 4th Infantry Division (Mechanized) and led the brigade through a year of combat operations in Saladin Province. Colonel Hickey, supported by Special Operations units, led the raid that captured Saddam Hussein on 13 December 2003. For this and recognized combat effectiveness, the "Raider Brigade" was recognized by the Secretary of the Army with the Valorous Unit Award.

After brigade command Colonel Hickey performed joint staff duties at the Institute of Defense Analysis in Alexandria, Virginia. During this assignment he performed sensitive intelligence analysis which led to his reassignment to the Iraq Theatre of Operations under the command of Lieutenant General Raymond T. Odierno in 2006. Colonel Hickey helped plan and oversee the execution of the "Surge" in direct support of the corps commanding general. He was credited by the commanding general for the dramatic reduction of improvised explosive device attacks against coalition troops due to the efforts of Colonel Hickey's Counter IED Operations Integration Cell.

Decorated for gallantry, valor and merit, Colonel Hickey's decorations include the Distinguished Service Medal, the Silver Star, the Defense Superior Service Medal, the Legion of Merit with Oak Leaf Cluster, the Bronze Star for Valor, the Bronze Star with Oak Leaf Cluster, the Iraq Campaign Medal, Four Stars and the Valorous Unit Award.

He was also interviewed and shown on the Military Channel show Ace in the Hole, and he featured in TV documentaries such as Zero Hour, 2003 BBC World News and 2009 The Surge: The Whole Story. Colonel Hickey is heavily featured in the book by Lieutenant Colonel (Retired) Steve Russell entitled We Got Him.

After retiring from the army, Colonel Hickey served for 3 1/2 years as vice president for ACADEMI's Security and Professional Services Business Unit (formerly Blackwater). In January 2015, he began work for Senator John McCain, Chairman of the Senate Armed Services Committee, as his senior military advisor. In January 2019, Colonel Hickey accepted a position as a vice president with Raytheon Intelligence and Space.

Colonel Hickey has been married to the former Maureen Kelly of Arlington, Virginia, since 1983.
