= Camp Nama =

Military base in Baghdad, Iraq

Camp Nama
- Baghdad, Baghdad Governorate in Iraq

Site information
- Owner: Ministry of Defence
- Operator: U.S. Air Force; U.S. Army; U.S. Marine Corps; CIA

Location
- Shown within Iraq
- Coordinates: 33°14′50″N 44°13′18″E

Site history
- Built: 2003
- In use: 2003-2004
- Battles/wars: Operation Iraqi Freedom

Camp Nama was a military base in Baghdad, Iraq, originally built by the government of Saddam Hussein, from which its name derives, and now used by Iraqi military forces. Purportedly, the original Iraqi name has been repurposed by U.S. personnel involved with the facility as a backronym standing for "Nasty Ass Military Area".

== History ==
After the 2003 U.S. invasion of Iraq, the camp was taken over by elite American special operations forces. The main purpose of the camp was to interrogate prisoners for information about Jordanian terrorist Abu Musab al-Zarqawi. The New York Times reported on 19 March 2006, the three-year anniversary of the U.S. invasion, that the elite unit, known as Task Force 6-26, used the facility to interrogate prisoners both before and after the Abu Ghraib prisoner abuse scandal. Some of the interrogation took place in "The Black Room", which used to be a torture chamber when Saddam's government ran the facility. The camp was the target of repeated warnings and investigations from U.S. officials since August 2003. There were placards around the camp that read "No Blood No Foul", a reference to the notion, described by a Pentagon official, that "If you don't make them bleed, they can't prosecute for it."

Allegations of abuse were first reported in the mainstream U.S. media in 2005. After the more extensive New York Times report in 2006, which was "based on documents and interviews with more than a dozen people", the independent organization Human Rights Watch issued a report documenting detainee abuse in Iraq. The report confirmed the charges about Camp Nama uncovered by The New York Times, noting that "from 2003 to the present, numerous U.S. personnel and Iraqi detainees have reported serious mistreatment of detainees by the special task force, including beatings, exposure to extreme cold, threats of death, humiliation, and various forms of heavy interrogation. Many of these allegations have been contained in documents released to the American Civil Liberties Union and other human rights groups pursuant to Freedom of Information Act litigation."

The report included an extensive interview with one Sergeant, using the pseudonym "Jeff Perry", who worked as an interrogator with the task force running the detention center. Sergeant "Perry" indicated that written authorizations were required for most abusive techniques, indicating that the use of these tactics was approved up the chain of command:

There was an authorization template on a computer, a sheet that you would print out, or actually just type it in. And it was a checklist. And it was all already typed out for you, environmental controls, hot and cold, you know, strobe lights, music, so forth. Working dogs, which, when I was there, wasn’t being used. But you would just check what you want to use off, and if you planned on using a harsh interrogation you’d just get it signed off.

I never saw a sheet that wasn’t signed. It would be signed off by the commander, whoever that was, whether it was O3 [captain] or O6 [colonel], whoever was in charge at the time. ... When the O6 was there, yeah, he would sign off on that. ... He would sign off on that every time it was done.

Some interrogators would go and use these techniques without typing up one of those things just because it was a hassle, or he didn’t want to do it and knew it was going to be approved anyway, and you’re not gonna get in that much trouble if you get caught doing one of these things without a signature.

Techniques involving outright assault—hitting, slapping, and beating—were apparently not on the list, but were regularly used at Nama, indicating that the harsh methods that were approved often degenerated into even harsher treatment in practice.

Human Rights Watch's senior researcher on terrorism and counterterrorism commented, "These accounts rebut U.S. government claims that torture and abuse in Iraq was unauthorized and exceptional—on the contrary, it was condoned and commonly used."

=== Investigation and inter-agency conflict ===
The reports of abuses inside Camp Nama were said to have outraged even seasoned CIA, FBI and DIA investigators accustomed to dealing with non-cooperative and hostile detainees, and to have provoked a culture clash between agencies and groups involved with the facility. By early 2004, one of Defense Secretary Donald H. Rumsfeld's top aides, Under-Secretary for Defense Intelligence Stephen A. Cambone, ordered a subordinate, DIA head Vice Adm. Lowell E. Jacoby to "get to the bottom" of any misconduct.

By June 25, 2004, Admiral Jacoby wrote a two-page memo to Cambone, in which he described a series of complaints, including a May 2004 incident in which a DIA interrogator said he witnessed task force soldiers punch a detainee hard enough to require medical help. The DIA officer took photos of the injuries, but a supervisor confiscated them, the memo said. The memo provoked an angry reaction from Cambone. "Get to the bottom of this immediately. This is not acceptable," Cambone said in a handwritten note on June 26, 2004, to his top deputy, Lt. Gen. William G. Boykin. "In particular, I want to know if this is part of a pattern of behavior by TF 6-26."

According to The New York Times article, General Boykin had earlier said (on March 17) through a spokesman that he told Mr. Cambone he had found no pattern of misconduct with the task force. The article does not provide further detail on Boykin's response to the investigation after Cambone's and Jacoby's intervention in June 2004.

=== Transfer to LSA Anaconda ===
According to The New York Times article, in the summer of 2004, Camp Nama closed and the unit moved to "a new headquarters in Balad, 45 miles north of Baghdad." This would probably refer to Balad AB, also known as Logistics Support Area Anaconda and later as Joint Base Balad.

Since the transfer the unit's operations are said to have been shrouded in even tighter secrecy. According to Thomas E. Ricks of The Washington Post, a new "detainee center" has indeed been established at Camp Balad, under the auspices of a new unit, the Joint Special Operations Task Force; entry is not permitted to normal Army Rangers personnel.

=== Prisoner abuse ===
British soldiers testified that:

- Iraqi prisoners being held for prolonged periods in cells the size of large dog kennels.
- Prisoners being subjected to electric shocks.
- Prisoners being routinely hooded.
- Inmates being taken into a sound-proofed shipping container for interrogation, and emerging in a state of physical distress.

== Special areas ==
=== The Black Room ===
Detainees at the camp that were considered "high-value" were interrogated in "The Black Room", a dark mostly bare room with large metal hooks hanging from the ceiling. The guards often used loud rock 'n' roll or rap music to torment prisoners during interrogations.

=== Motel 6 and Hotel California ===
The New York Times mentions other whimsically named sections of Camp Nama, including Motel 6, "a group of securely constructed wooden holding cells constructed by the United States Navy Seabees of Charlie Company NMCB-1 Air-Det. Conditions were cramped, forcing many prisoners to squat or crouch", in a block of 6-by-8 cubicles known as Hotel California. These holding cells were constructed to hold the leaders and Individuals responsible for terrorist acts and murders.

== See also ==
- Task Force 121
