= Capture of Saddam Hussein =

2003 U.S. military operation in the Iraq War

Operation Red Dawn
- Part of the Iraq War
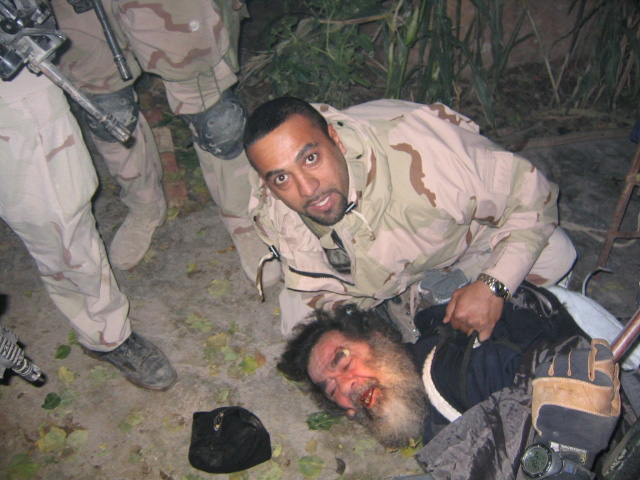
- Samir, a 34-year-old Iraqi-American military interpreter, who helped find Saddam and pulled him from his hideaway in December 2003
- Location: Ad-Dawr, Iraq; 34°28′22″N 43°46′53″E
- Commanded by: (United States) Maj. Gen. Raymond Odierno; (United States) Col. James Hickey; (United States) Lt. Col. Steve Russell
- Target: (Iraq) Saddam Hussein (POW)
- Date: 13 December 2003; 22 years ago
- Executed by: 4th Infantry Division: 1st Brigade Combat Team; Task Force 121: C Squadron – Delta Force; ISA
- Outcome: Operational success: Capture and arrest of deposed Iraqi president Saddam Hussein and two others

Saddam Hussein, the deposed president of Iraq, was captured by the United States military in the town of Ad-Dawr, Iraq, on 13 December 2003. The military operation to capture him was codenamed Operation Red Dawn, after the 1984 American film Red Dawn.

The mission was executed by joint operations Task Force 121—an elite and covert joint special operations team, supported by the 1st Brigade Combat Team (led by Colonel James Hickey) of the 4th Infantry Division, commanded by Major General Raymond Odierno.

They searched two sites, "Wolverine 1" and "Wolverine 2", outside ad-Dawr, and did not find Saddam. A continued search between the two sites found Saddam hiding in a "spider hole" at 20:30 local Iraqi time. Saddam did not resist capture.

== Background ==
Saddam disappeared from public view shortly after the 2003 U.S. invasion of Iraq began. The U.S. military labelled him "High Value Target Number One" (HVT1) and began one of the largest manhunts in history.

Between July and December 2003, JSOC's Task Force 121 carried out twelve unsuccessful raids to find Saddam, together with 600 other operations against targets, including 300 interrogations. On 1 December 2003, a former driver divulged the name Muhammed Ibrahim Omar al-Musslit — Saddam's comrade, known to TF 121 as "the source" or "the fatman". Over the next two weeks, nearly 40 members of his family were interrogated to ascertain his location. On 12 December 2003, a raid on a house in Baghdad that was being used as an insurgent headquarters captured Omar. Early the next morning he revealed where Saddam may be found. This intelligence and other intelligence from detained former members of the Ba'ath Party, supported by signals intelligence from the ISA, finally pinpointed Saddam at a remote farm compound south of Tikrit.

== Operation ==
Operation Red Dawn was launched after gaining actionable intelligence identifying two likely locations of Saddam's whereabouts code-named Wolverine 1 and Wolverine 2, near the town of ad-Dawr. C squadron Delta Force, ISA operators under Task Force 121, and the First Brigade Combat Team of the 4th Infantry Division conducted the operation. The operation was named after the 1984 film Red Dawn. The site names "Wolverine 1" and "Wolverine 2" are also a reference to the American insurgent group in the film. The forces involved in the operation consisted of approximately 600 soldiers including cavalry, artillery, aviation, engineer, and special operations forces.

The forces cleared the two objectives but initially did not find the target. Then, as the operators were finishing and the helicopters called in to extract them, one soldier kicked a piece of flooring to one side, exposing a spider hole; he prepared to throw a grenade into it – in case it led to an insurgent tunnel system – when suddenly Saddam appeared. The soldier struck him with the stock of his M4 carbine and disarmed him of a Glock 18C.

Saddam surrendered and offered no resistance; he was taken by an MH-6 Little Bird from the 160th SOAR to the Tikrit Mission Support Site where he was properly identified. He was then taken in an MH-60K Blackhawk helicopter by 160th SOAR from Tikrit to Baghdad and into custody at Baghdad International Airport. Along with the Glock, an AK-47 and $750,000 in U.S. bank notes were recovered from the spider hole. Two other individuals were also detained.

== Aftermath ==
After the capture of Saddam, the 4th Infantry Division's area of operations in the upper Tigris saw its "first period of real calm". CJTF-7 also saw IED attacks reduce by 39 percent. The perceived security improvements led CJTF-7 and the CPA to adopt an optimistic outlook as 2003 ended. CJTF-7 believed that the capture of Saddam and his money heralded the defeat of the former regime's insurgency. Using documents and materials captured in the operation, CJTF-7 units pursued "what they believed were the last vestiges of the former Ba'athist resistance".

== Reactions ==
=== Middle East ===
- Bahrain: The official Bahrain News Agency quoted an official government source saying, "The kingdom sees this day as a new page for Iraq so its people may take sure steps to restore their role at the Arab and regional and international levels."
- Egypt: Foreign Minister Ahmed Maher said, "I don't think anyone will be sad over Saddam Hussein. His arrest does not change the fact that his regime was finished, and it is the natural consequence of the regime's fall. The Iraqi regime had harmed the Iraqi people, and had pulled the Arab region into several storms."
- Iran: Vice President Mohammad-Ali Abtahi expressed satisfaction, stating, "I am happy they have arrested a criminal, whoever it may be, and I am even more happy, because it is a criminal who committed so many crimes against Iranians." Abtahi joined the call for justice, adding, "Iranians have suffered much, because of him, and [the] mass graves in Iraq prove the crimes he has committed against the Iraqi people".
- Israel: Prime minister Ariel Sharon congratulated President Bush on the fight against terrorism, and stated: "Today is a great day for the democratic world and the fight for freedom and justice and for those who fight against terror. We are relieved that this murderer and dictator can no longer stand in the way of the rebuilding and reconstruction of the country he destroyed."
- Jordan: The government spokeswoman said she hoped that a page has been turned and that the Iraqi people would be able to assume their responsibilities as soon as possible and build their future according to their will. The first and last word concerning the capture of Saddam or his fate must be given to the Iraqi people.
- Lebanon: The country was tense at news of the U.S. capture of Saddam at the weekend; people were surprised by how easily he was captured, however, it did not equal a U.S. military victory. "The capture of Saddam will not save the U.S. from the world's condemnation for supporting the greater enemy, Israeli P.M. Ariel Sharon", said Selim Al-Hoss, ex-Lebanese Prime Minister.
- Palestine: Palestinian President Yasser Arafat's government had no comment; however Abdel-Aziz al-Rantissi, a senior Hamas leader, said the U.S. would "pay a very high price for the mistake" of capturing Saddam.
- Saudi Arabia: Prince Bandar bin Sultan, Saudi ambassador to the United States, stated that "Saddam Hussein was a menace to the Arab world."
- Syria: President Bashar al-Assad refused to comment on Saddam's capture and instead stated, "an issue that concerns Iraq and not Syria." Syrian Information Minister Ahmad al-Hassan advised Syria's position on Iraq was not based on the fate of individuals. "We want an Iraq that preserves its territorial integrity, its unity and its sovereignty."

=== Asia ===
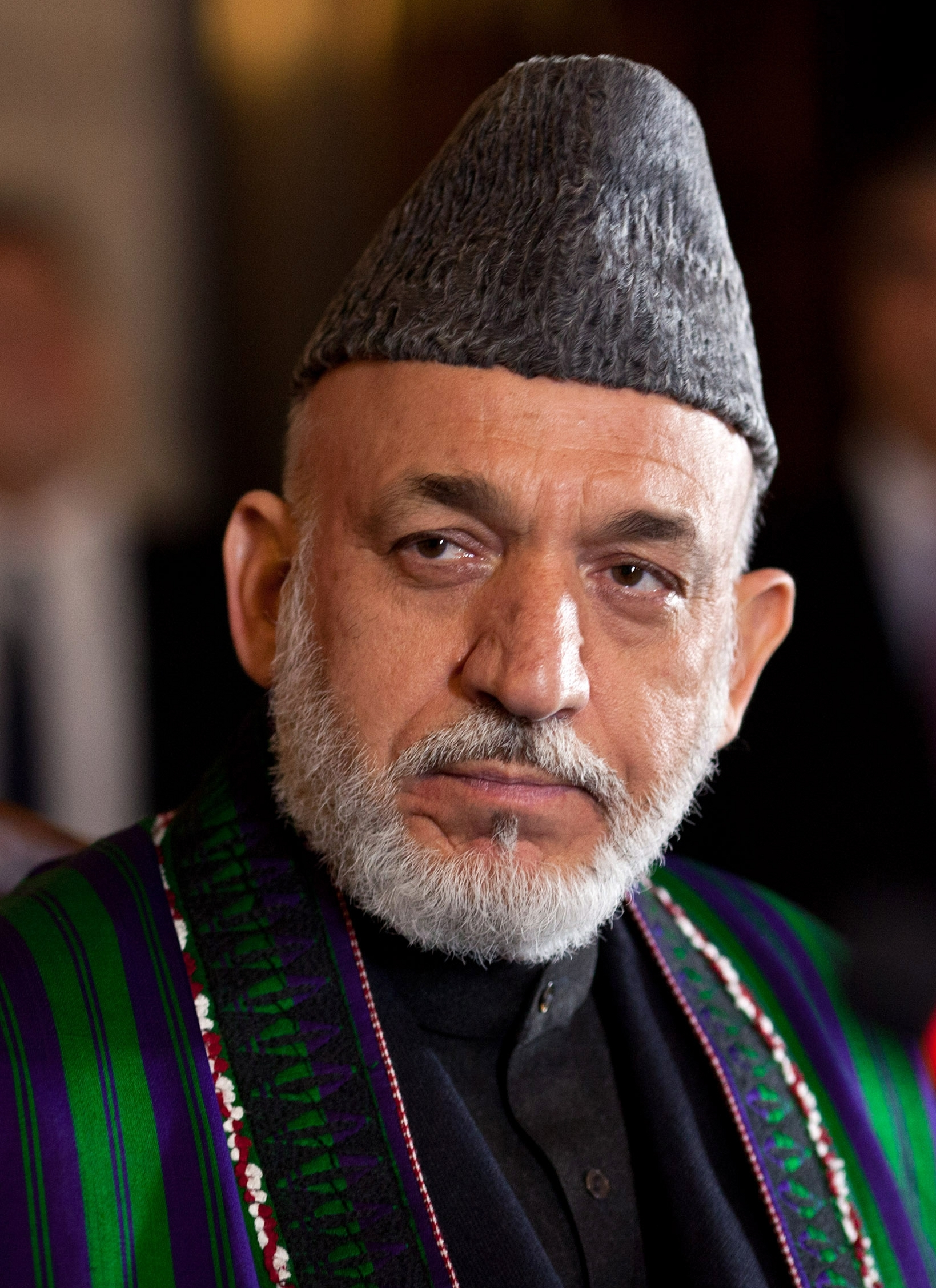
Afghan president Hamid Karzai welcomed the news.

- Afghanistan: The Afghan government welcomed news of the capture of Saddam, deeming it a warning to opposition leaders such as Osama bin Laden and Mullah Omar.
- Bangladesh: Foreign Minister Morshed Khan was quoted as saying, "We hope this will pave the way for the Iraqi people to have a government of their own, a government by the people and for the people of Iraq."
- China: Foreign Ministry spokesman Liu Jianchao hoped that the latest development of the situation in Iraq was conducive to the Iraqi people taking their destiny into their own hands, and to realizing peace and stability in Iraq.
- Hong Kong: Sing Tao Daily editorialized: "The desperate capture of Iraqi former president Saddam symbolizes the bad fate of a corrupt dictator and also the best Christmas present this year for US President George Bush, but for the Iraqis who have undergone a baptism of fire in the war, the days of peace are still far away, and the road of reconstruction is as long and arduous as before." South China Morning Post editorialized: "With Hussein's capture, Iraqis can at last begin to close this brutal and tragic chapter in their history."
- India: The Indian government's response to the capture of Saddam was measured and guarded. When Secretary of State Colin Powell called Foreign Minister Yashwant Sinha on Monday to discuss the capture of Saddam, whom Washington had named a tyrant, Sinha is said to have reacted in a manner that did not echo the effusion flowing from the rest of the world. In the words of an official with the foreign ministry, Sinha "maintained a stiff upper lip". Sinha, in his brief conversation with Powell, merely expressed hope that such developments would contribute to the stabilization of Iraq. Powell told Sinha that the capture would bring "a change in the existing situation and lead to greater respect for the Iraqi Governing Council."
- Indonesia: In Indonesia, the reaction was muted. Foreign Ministry spokesman Marty Natalegawa said the arrest of the former Iraqi president had not changed how Indonesia felt about the situation in Iraq. Indonesia's leaders strongly opposed the U.S.-led invasion of Iraq. Indonesian leaders also said they hoped the capture of Saddam would help bring peace to Iraq and return control of the country back to its citizens.
- Japan: Prime Minister Junichiro Koizumi on Monday said he hoped that Saddam's capture would lead to improvements in Iraq. He said the capture would be positive if it brings major steps toward the stability and reconstruction of Iraq. Koizumi's cabinet had approved a controversial plan to send troops to Iraq. He said he would continue to assess the security situation in Iraq before dispatching the soldiers. Chief Cabinet Secretary Yasuo Fukuda agreed the arrest was "great news," but cautioned it would not necessarily lead to peace. "The problem, however, is terrorism. I don't think the arrest of Saddam Hussein can stop all terror attacks," Fukuda said.
- Malaysia: The Malaysian government said the Iraqi people should decide how Saddam would be brought to justice on accusations of gross human rights violations. Iraqis should "be given the right to decide on the manner and procedure of bringing Saddam Hussein to face justice," said Prime Minister Abdullah Ahmad Badawi, head of the Non-Aligned Movement. Foreign Minister Syed Hamid Albar expressed hope that the capture of Saddam Hussein would contribute towards bringing peace and stability in Iraq and the surrounding region and stated that the United Nations should now play a bigger role in achieving this objective. "With peace and stability in Iraq, we hope that an Iraqi government representing the free and independent Iraqi people could be set up to start the reconstruction process of that nation for the benefit of its people," he said. He said the views and inputs of the Iraqis should be taken into account in deciding whatever action would be initiated against Saddam. Former prime minister Mahathir Mohammed urged a fair trial for Saddam.
- Pakistan: The response in Pakistan also was low-key. Foreign Office spokesman Masood Khan described the event as "an important development" but refrained from offering further commentary or elaboration on its implications.
- Taiwan: An hour after U.S. announced the capture, President Chen Shui Bian congratulated the U.S. for what he called "a big victory".

=== Europe ===
- Belgium: The Flemish-language newspaper De Standaard editorialized that "Showing degrading pictures of a prisoner, even if he was a cruel tyrant, does not increase the moral authority of those who overpowered him."
- Germany: Chancellor Gerhard Schröder greeted the development "with much happiness." In a telegram to George W. Bush, he called for intensified efforts to rebuild Iraq.
- Vatican City: Top Curia official Renato Martino, a cardinal deacon and President of the Pontifical Council for Justice and Peace, attacked the way Saddam was treated by his captors, saying he had been dealt with like an animal. Martino said he had felt pity watching video of "this man destroyed, [the military] looking at his teeth as if he were a beast." The cardinal, a leading critic of the U.S.-led war in Iraq, said he hoped the capture would not make matters "worse." Pope John Paul II did not comment.
- Poland: Poland at the time commanded thousands of international troops in Iraq. Defence Minister Jerzy Szmajdziński welcomed the news, but said the arrest could prompt retaliation from Saddam's supporters. "The coming days could be equally dangerous as these past days," he said.
- Russia: Foreign Minister Igor Ivanov said, "We think the arrest of Saddam Hussein will contribute to the strengthening of security in Iraq and to the process of political regulation in the country with the active participation of the United Nations."
- United Kingdom: Prime Minister Tony Blair, President George W. Bush's strongest ally in the Iraq War, called the capture good news for Iraqis, saying: "It removes the shadow that has been hanging over them for too long of the nightmare of a return to the Saddam regime."

=== North America ===
- Canada: Prime Minister Paul Martin congratulated U.S. troops, and sent telegrams of congratulations to U.S. President George W. Bush and British Prime Minister Tony Blair. He would state that he was confident that the deposed Iraqi leader will be prosecuted fairly. "What's important is that he be tried before a tribunal that is just, that is credible and that has international recognition," said Martin, "I'm sure that will be the case." Martin spoke to reporters from his Montreal riding, saying Saddam's capture would bolster reconstruction efforts in Iraq. "Now that he has been captured there's no doubt in my mind that we will now be able to move to a very very different level of reconstruction," he said. "This is a great victory to the coalition forces but the biggest winners of all of this will be the people of Iraq," he said.
- United States:
  - President George W. Bush said that Saddam would "face the justice he denied to millions. For the Ba'athist holdouts responsible for the violence, there will be no return to the corrupt power and privilege they once held".
  - Secretary of Defense Donald Rumsfeld stated, "Here was a man who was photographed hundreds of times shooting off rifles and showing how tough he was, and in fact, he wasn't very tough, he was cowering in a hole in the ground, and had a pistol and didn't use it, and certainly did not put up any fight at all. I think that ... he resulted in the death of an awful lot of Iraqi people, In the last analysis, he seemed not terribly brave." Rumsfeld said the U.S. had not decided whether to classify Saddam as a prisoner of war, but that the U.S. would abide by the Geneva Conventions. More than 24 hours after his capture, the uncooperative Saddam had said little in his interrogation.

=== Oceania ===
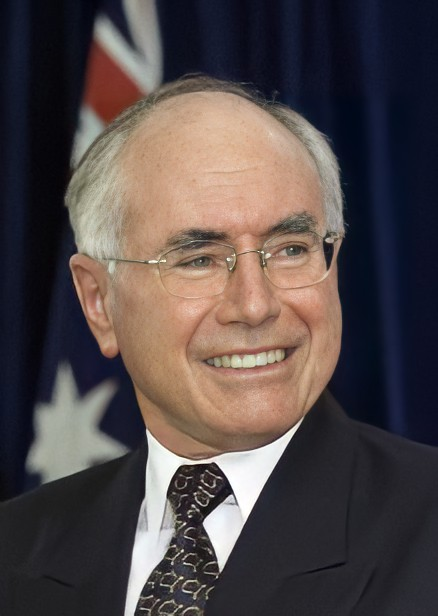
Australian Prime Minister John Howard urged the trial of Saddam.

- Australia: Prime Minister John Howard welcomed the news. He said the Iraqi people could breathe a sigh of relief now that the former dictator was no longer at large.
- New Zealand: Prime Minister Helen Clark reiterated the New Zealand legislature's opposition to capital punishment, with such opposition extending to the treatment of Saddam.

=== Africa ===
- Kenya: The newspaper People Daily wrote, "The capture of deposed Iraq leader Saddam Hussein is, no doubt, a major victory for the United States and the coalition of the willing, chief among which is Britain. The curtain has now fallen on one of the world's most ruthless and intriguing leaders."

=== International organizations ===
- Arab League: Secretary General Amr Mussa said, "It's the Iraqi people who must decide the fate of the old regime and its old leaders," especially "after the unacceptable and serious developments discovered after the fall of the regime." Agence France-Presse reportedly reported that Amr Mussa said this "with regard to issues such as the discovery of mass graves in the wake of the U.S. invasion".
- International Committee of the Red Cross: The International Committee of the Red Cross says the US-led coalition in Iraq had given the agency the "green light" to visit Saddam Hussein, the former Iraqi leader. Red Cross spokesman Florian Westphal confirmed that ICRC visits to the captured Iraqi leader would go ahead according to international rules governing the detention of all prisoners of war. He said discussions are under way as to how and where those visits would take place.
- United Nations: A spokesman for Kofi Annan, United Nations Secretary General, said the capture "offers an opportunity to give fresh impetus to the search for peace and stability in Iraq". Former UN chief weapons inspector Hans Blix said the Allied coalition might ask Saddam meaningful questions about Iraq's nuclear, biological, and chemical weapons programmes, "He ought to know quite a lot, and be able to tell the story; we all want to get to the bottom of the barrel".

== POW status ==
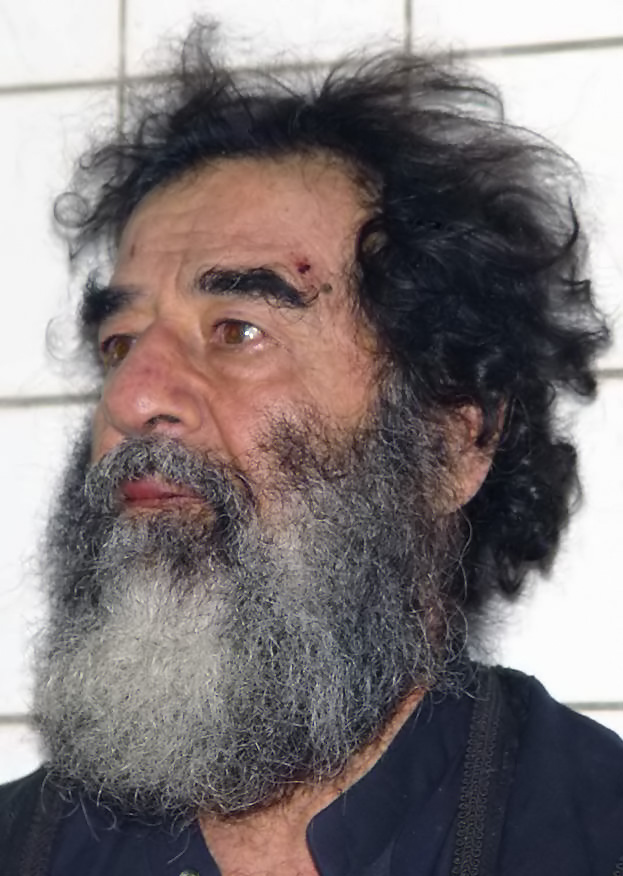
Saddam shortly after his capture

A Pentagon spokesman said he was given prisoner of war (POW) status as he was the leader of the "old regime's military forces".

The spokesman, Major Michael Shavers, said Saddam, captured by U.S. troops in December, was entitled to all the rights under the Geneva Conventions. The International Committee of the Red Cross had asked to visit the former Iraqi leader as soon as possible. Shavers did not give further details about Saddam's conditions of detention.

POW status for Saddam meant that the former Iraqi leader would be eligible to stand trial for war crimes and crimes against humanity.

There was controversy over TV pictures which showed Saddam undergoing a medical examination after his capture—footage regarded by some as a failure to protect him from public curiosity. A leading Vatican clergyman described the scenes as Saddam being "treated like a cow," and some sections of the Arab world were deeply offended by them. The U.S. maintains that the pictures were shown to demonstrate to the Iraqi people that they no longer had anything to fear.

A senior British official said Saddam—who was being held at an undisclosed location and interrogated by the Central Intelligence Agency (CIA)—was still refusing to co-operate with his captors, but the former president's capture the previous month was yielding results "far greater than we expected," the official told reporters on condition of anonymity.

The U.S.-led coalition had used documents found with the ex-leader to mount operations against Saddam loyalists, the official said.

== Cultural impact ==
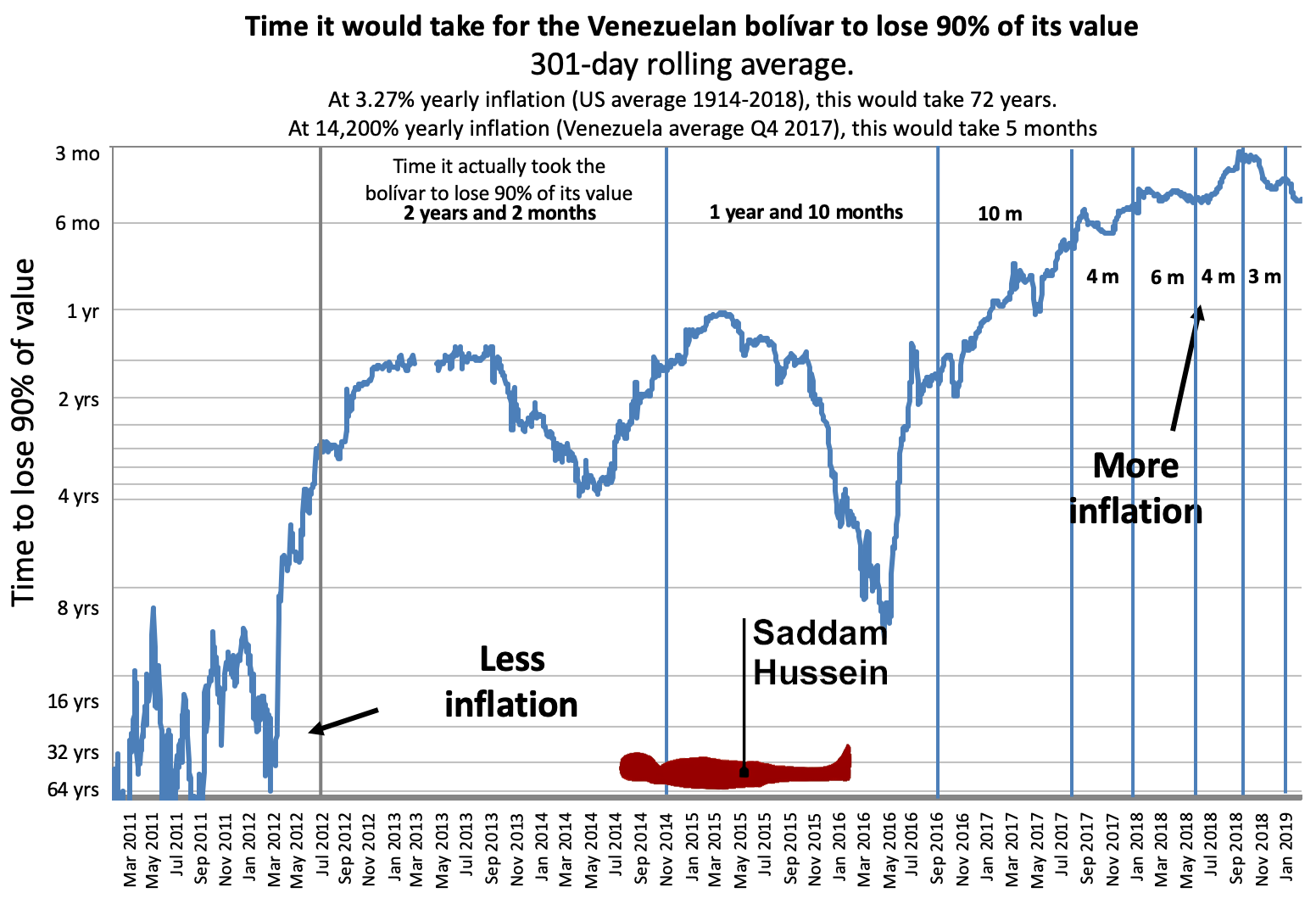
Vandalism on Wikipedia where the meme was used

A British graphic from 2003 which depicted Hussein's hiding spot became an internet meme in the 2020s. The graphic depicts Hussein as a small red figure lying on its back in a spider hole, also highlighting other features of the hiding place including an air vent, fan, and an entrance hidden by bricks and rubble. The simple shape of the design later became subject to pareidolia online, with examples of the graphic's likeness in foods and other products being reposted as memes on social media, particularly on TikTok. The graphic was ranked as one of the best Halloween costumes of 2024 by the British lifestyle magazine Dazed and the digital media company The Daily Dot, and was regarded by the American monthly magazine The Rolling Stone as one of the best memes of 2024.

== See also ==
- Interrogation of Saddam Hussein
- Trial of Saddam Hussein
- Execution of Saddam Hussein
- High-value target
- Manhunt (military)
