= Clyde Lee Conrad =

American spy for Hungary

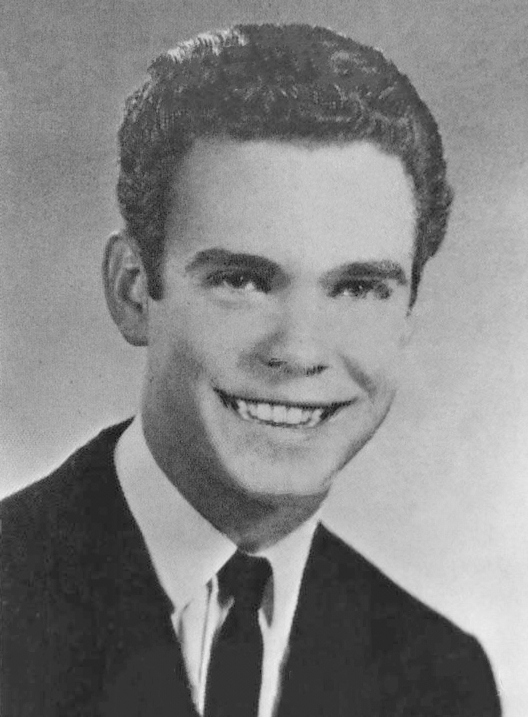
Clyde Lee Conrad in 1965

Clyde Lee Conrad (1948 – January 8, 1998) was a U.S. Army non-commissioned officer who, from 1974 until his arrest on August 23, 1988, sold top secret classified information to the People's Republic of Hungary, including top secret NATO war plans. He was convicted of espionage and high treason in a German court in 1990, and was sentenced to life imprisonment. Graduating from Sebring Mckinley High School in Sebring, Ohio, he was a member of and a letterman in both track and rifle, and was known as being quiet and a good student.

== Espionage ==
According to court records, Conrad was introduced to the Hungarian secret service in 1975 by his supervisor in the 8th Infantry Division, former U.S. Army Sergeant First Class Zoltan Szabo. Szabo, who was convicted of espionage in Austria in 1989, received a 10-month suspended sentence in exchange for assisting in the investigation by identifying some of the documents Conrad sold to the Hungarians.

Among the documents sold by Conrad were the wartime general defense plans (GDP) of many units, containing the precise description of where every unit was to go in case of war, and how they would defend. Conrad was originally recruited by Szabo, a Hungarian émigré who served in the U.S. Army as both an NCO and an officer before becoming a colonel in the Hungarian Military Intelligence Service, shortly before Szabo retired from the U.S. military.

It is still unknown today how many people participated in the Szabo-Conrad spy ring, but it is known that their espionage activities lasted for several decades.

Four others were later convicted on espionage charges in Florida for involvement with Conrad's spy ring:

- Roderick James Ramsay, sentenced in August 1992 to 36 years imprisonment.
- Jeffrey Rondeau and Jeffrey Gregory, who were sentenced in June 1994 to 18 years imprisonment each.
- Kelly Therese Warren, sentenced on February 12, 1999, to 25 years imprisonment.

Conrad's method of recruitment was usually attempts to appeal to enlisted Army personnel, promising them large amounts of money for supplying him with intelligence reports. Ramsay alleged to the FBI that Conrad had recruited dozens of personnel, including at least one member of the Army's counter-espionage branch, and at least one officer who later became a general.

== Arrest and aftermath ==
Conrad was arrested in 1988 by West German authorities and tried for high treason and espionage on behalf of the Hungarian and Czechoslovak intelligence services. Conrad was convicted by the Koblenz State Appellate Court on June 6, 1990, of all charges and was sentenced to life imprisonment, fined 2 million marks ($1.18 million), and ordered to forfeit all proceeds from his activities.

German prosecutors said that the documents Conrad leaked—dealing with troop movements, NATO strategy, and nuclear weapons sites—eventually made their way to the Soviet KGB, while Chief Judge Ferdinand Schuth, who presided over the case, concluded in the verdict that because of Conrad's treason:

If war had broken out between NATO and the Warsaw Pact, the West would have faced certain defeat. NATO would have quickly been forced to choose between capitulation or the use of nuclear weapons on German territory. Conrad's treason had doomed the Federal Republic to become a nuclear battlefield.

Conrad died of a heart attack at the age of 50 in Diez prison on January 8, 1998. Of all Americans convicted of espionage, Conrad is one of only five spies to have been considered to have made $1 million or more for spying, alongside Aldrich Ames, Larry Wu-Tai Chin, Robert Hanssen, and John Walker.
