= 109th Military Intelligence Battalion =

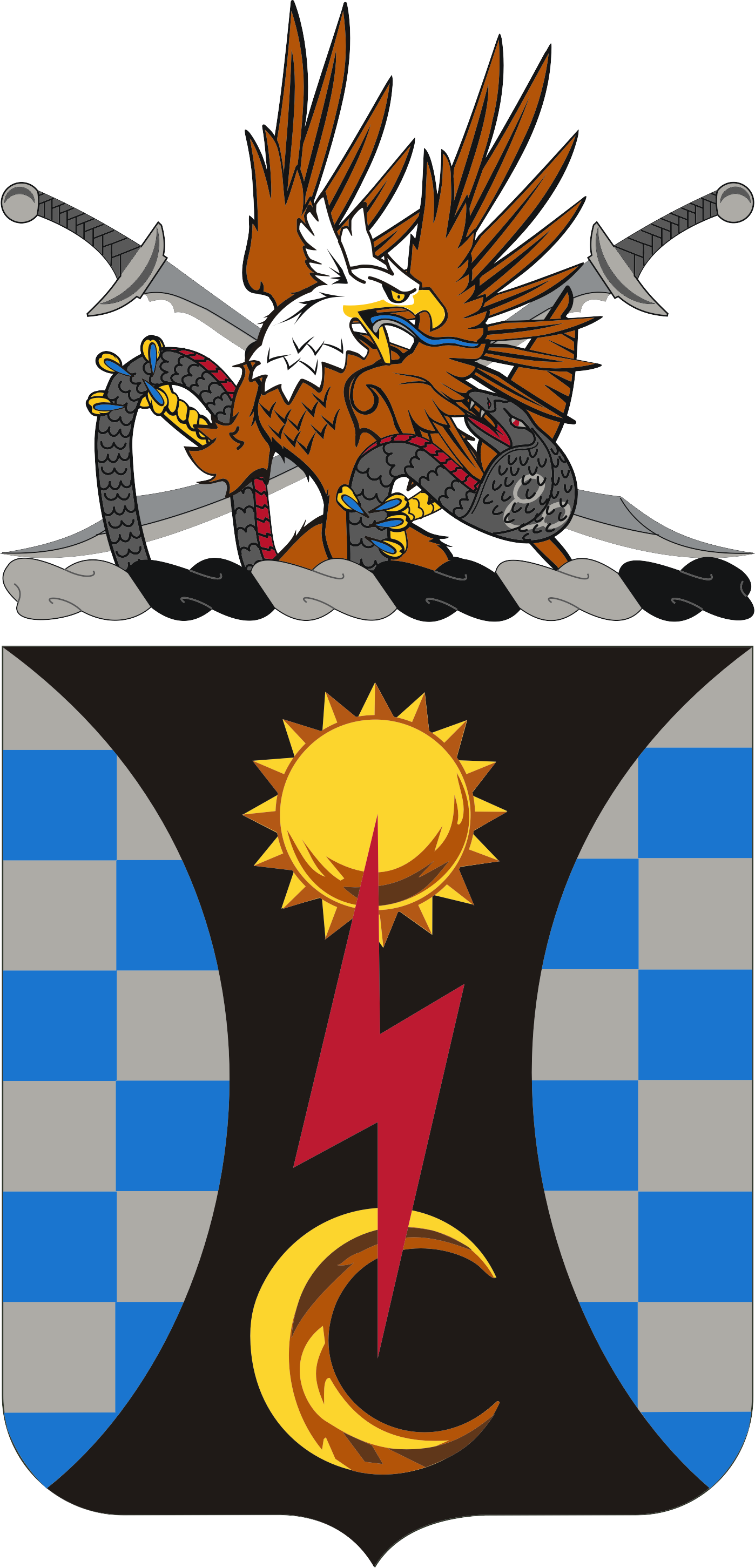
- 109th MI Battalion Coat of Arms
- Active: 1 October 1981 – 15 September 1991; 17 October 2008 – 12 May 2021
- Disbanded: 2021
- Country: United States
- Branch: United States Army
- Role: Military Intelligence
- Size: Battalion
- Part of: 201st Expeditionary Military Intelligence Brigade
- Garrison/HQ: Joint Base Lewis–McChord, Washington
- Nickname: Disrupters
- Mottos: "Seek and Disrupt"
- Colors: Oriental Blue; Silver Gray
- Anniversaries: 1 October
- Engagements: Operation Iraqi Freedom; Operation Enduring Freedom

The 109th Expeditionary Military Intelligence Battalion is an inactive military Intelligence battalion of the United States Army. Last headquartered at Joint Base Lewis–McChord, Washington, it was part of the 201st Expeditionary Military Intelligence Brigade under I Corps prior to its inactivation 12 May 2021. The Battalion's last commander was LTC Raven B. Stein.

== History ==
=== Reactivation ===
On 9 October 2008, the 109th MI Bn was reactivated and assigned to the 201st BfSB to conduct intelligence analysis and counterintelligence, human intelligence, and signals intelligence collection. The 109th MI Bn, like its sister BfSB MI battalions, was designed to be decentralized across the battle space, covering different missions for different maneuver commanders in a theater of operations.

=== Operation Iraqi Freedom and Operation Enduring Freedom ===
The 109th MI Bn deployed with the 201st BfSB as a battalion task force in support of Operation Iraqi Freedom and Operation New Dawn, from 27 September 2009 to 20 September 2010. The battalion later deployed to Afghanistan from 22 May 2012 to 16 February 2013, and deployed to Afghanistan again in 2014 to 2015.

=== Recent Items of Note ===
On 15 April 2013, the 109th MI Bn was notified that it had been awarded the National Security Agency Director's Trophy, "awarded annually by the Director of the National Security Agency to the Army intelligence unit or element judged to have made the most outstanding contributions to the mission during the previous calendar year. It is the most prominent award given by the National Security Agency to a unit or element." The trophy was awarded for providing critical signals intelligence support during the battalion's deployment to Regional Command East, Afghanistan.

== Unit Heraldry ==
=== Coat of arms ===
Blazon
Shield
Sable, between two flaunches checky Argent (Silver Gray) and Azure (Oriental Blue) a sun in splendor in chief and in base a decrescent Or, overall palewise a lightning flash Gules.
Crest
From a wreath of the colors Argent (Silver Gray) and Sable upon two scimitars per saltire Proper, a demi-gryphon Gold Brown, beak, feet and eye Or, armed and langued Celeste, langued detailed of the first, outlined and detailed of the second, clasping a writhing cobra Gris, with its underbelly, mouth and iris Gules, eye, fangs and cowl marking of the first, scaled, outlined and detailed of the second.
Motto
SEEK AND DISRUPT.

Symbolism
Shield
Silver gray and oriental blue are the colors of Military Intelligence. The checkered arrangement reflects the multifaceted intelligence and electronic warfare capabilities of the Battalion. The black center field suggests secrecy and symbolizes tactical operations security. The sun and moon symbols and the two hemispheres denote round-the-clock tactical and global deployment capabilities. The red flash is a symbol of both the offensive combat capability of electronic warfare as well as the long range electronic surveillance characteristics of the Battalion.
Crest
The gryphon represents American intervention in Iraq by symbolizing military courage and strength while serving as a reminder that the Army must combine intelligence and strength to prevail against evil. The cobra represents forces threatening the safety and security of the Iraqi people and symbolizes a threat that is not easily removed from harm's way. The two crossed scimitars recall the swords erected by Saddam Hussein during his reign; the points down symbolize the goal of freedom and peace for the Iraqi people, after the fall of Saddam Hussein.

Background The coat of arms was approved on 2 September 1981. It was amended to add a crest on 19 July 2011.

=== Distinctive unit insignia ===
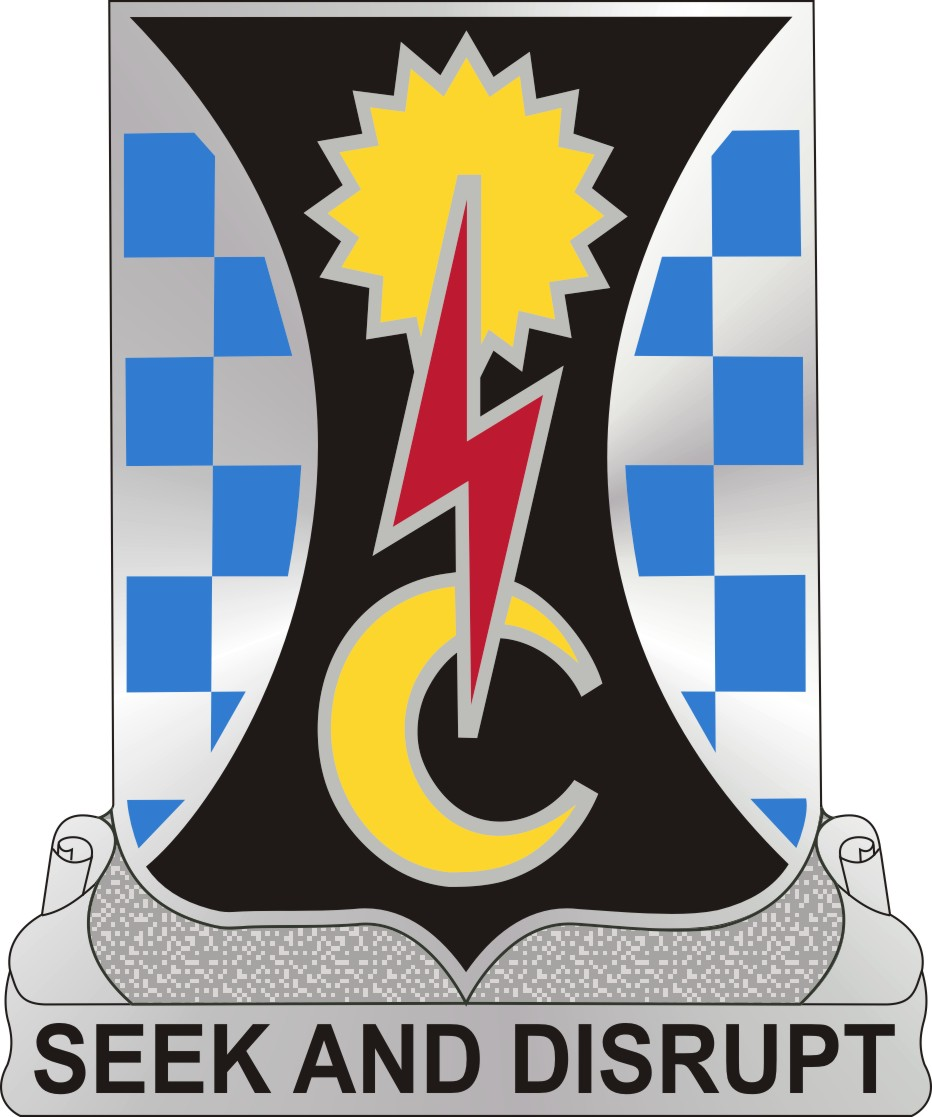

Description A Silver color metal and enamel device 1 1/8 inches (2.86 cm) in height overall consisting of a shield blazoned: Sable, between two flaunches checky Argent (Silver Gray) and Azure (Oriental Blue) a sun in splendor in chief and in base a decrescent Or, overall palewise a lightning flash Gules. Attached below the shield a Silver scroll inscribed "SEEK AND DISRUPT" in Black letters.

Symbolism Silver gray and oriental blue are the colors of Military Intelligence. The checkered arrangement reflects the multifaceted intelligence and electronic warfare capabilities of the Battalion. The black center field suggests secrecy and symbolizes tactical operations security. The sun and moon symbols and the two hemispheres denote round-the-clock tactical and global deployment capabilities. The red flash is a symbol of both the offensive combat capability of electronic warfare as well as the long range electronic surveillance characteristics of the Battalion.

Background The distinctive unit insignia was approved on 2 September 1981. It was amended to update the description on 19 July 2011.

== Lineage and honors ==
109th Expeditionary Military Intelligence Battalion Lineage

The 109th Military Intelligence Battalion was constituted in the Regular Army on 1 October 1981 and assigned to the 9th Infantry Division. The battalion was activated at Fort Lewis, Washington, with the 335th Army Security Agency Company and the 9th Military Intelligence Company being concurrently reorganized, redesignated, and placed under the command of the 109th as Companies A and B respectively. The battalion was subsequently relieved from assignment to the 9th Infantry Division and inactivated on 15 September 1991 at Fort Lewis. The 109th MI Battalion was activated on 17 October 2008, again at Fort Lewis, Washington, as one of the subordinate battalions within the 201st Battlefield Surveillance Brigade. Most recently, on 17 October 2015 the 109th MI Battalion was redesignated as an Expeditionary Military Intelligence Battalion within the 201st Expeditionary Military Intelligence Brigade.

Separate Lineage for Company A, 109th Military Intelligence Battalion

Company A of the 109th Military Intelligence Battalion was constituted on 27 March 1942 in the Army of the United States as the 112th Signal Radio Intelligence Company. The 112th was activated on 18 May 1942 at Camp Crowder, Missouri. Several months later, on 1 September 1945, the company was reorganized and redesignated as the 112th Signal Service Company. Following service during World War II, the 112th Signal Service Company was inactivated on 23 December 1945 while in the Philippines. On 20 December 1946, the company was allotted to the Regular Army and activated in the Philippines as the 112th Signal Service Company (Philippine Scouts). On 1 April 1947, the company was reorganized and redesignated as the 10th Signal Service Battalion (Philippine Scouts) before being reverted to the 112th Signal Service Company (Philippine Scouts) on 12 June 1948. The 112th Signal Service Company (Philippine Scouts) was again inactivated on 1 June 1949 in the Philippines.

On 17 July 1951, the company was converted and redesignated as the 335th Communication Reconnaissance Company, and on 6 April 1966 it was redesignated as the 335th Army Security Agency (ASA) Company. The 335th ASA Company was activated 15 June 1966 at Fort Riley, Kansas, before being inactivated on 5 April 1971 in Vietnam. The 335th ASA Company was later reactivated on 21 December 1977 at Fort Lewis, Washington. On 1 October 1981, upon the company's merger with the 109th Military Intelligence Battalion headquarters, the 335th Army Security Agency Company became Company A, 109th Military Intelligence Battalion.

Separate Lineage for Company B, 109th Military Intelligence Battalion

Company B was originally constituted on 12 July 1944 in the Army of the United States as the 9th Counter Intelligence Corps Detachment, being subsequently activated on 16 August 1944 in France from personnel of the provisional Counter Intelligence Corps detachment attached to the 9th Infantry Division. The detachment was then inactivated on 20 April 1947 in Germany, and allotted on 5 January 1949 to the Regular Army. The 9th Counter Intelligence Corps Detachment was reactivated on 28 January 1949 at Fort Dix, New Jersey, then inactivated on 12 March 1951, also at Fort Dix, New Jersey.

On 15 June 1954, the 9th Counter Intelligence Corps Detachment was reactivated in Germany, and on 25 January 1958, the detachment was reorganized and redesignated as the 9th Military Intelligence Detachment. The detachment was later inactivated on 31 January 1962 at Fort Carson Colorado. The 9th Military Intelligence Detachment was reactivated on 1 July 1966 at Fort Riley, Kansas, before being inactivated on 25 September 1969 at Schofield Barracks, Hawaii. On 21 December 1972, the detachment was redesignated as the 9th Military Intelligence Company and activated at Fort Lewis, Washington. On 21 July 1978, the company was assigned to the 9th Infantry Division. Like Company A, on 1 October 1981, the company merged with the 109th Military Intelligence Battalion headquarters, and the 9th Military Intelligence Company became Company B, 109th Military Intelligence Battalion.

109th Military Intelligence Battalion Campaign Participation Credit and Decorations

Conflict/Decoration	Streamer/Device	Inscription
Operation Iraqi Freedom/Operation New Dawn		IRAQI SOVEREIGNTY 2009-2010 NEW DAWN 2010-2011
Operation Enduring Freedom		TRANSITION I (2011-2014) TRANSITION II (ongoing)
Meritorious Unit Commendation		IRAQ 2009-2010 AFGHANISTAN 2012-2013

Separate Campaign Credit and Decorations for Company A, 109th Military Intelligence Battalion

Conflict/Decoration	Streamer/Device	Inscription
World War II Pacific Theater		NORTHERN SOLOMONS 1943-1944 LUZON 1944-1945 (with arrowhead device)
Vietnam		VIETNAM COUNTEROFFENSIVE, PHASE II 1966-1967 VIETNAM COUNTEROFFENSIVE, PHASE III 1967-1968; TET COUNTEROFFENSIVE 1968; VIETNAM COUNTEROFFENSIVE, PHASE IV 1968; VIETNAM COUNTEROFFENSIVE, PHASE V 1968; VIETNAM COUNTEROFFENSIVE, PHASE VI, 1968-1969; TET 69/COUNTEROFFENSIVE, 1969; VIETNAM SUMMER-FALL 1969; VIETNAM WINTER-SPRING 1970; SANCTUARY COUNTEROFFENSIVE 1970; Counteroffensive, Phase VII
Meritorious Unit Commendation		VIETNAM 1967 VIETNAM 1967-1968; VIETNAM 1968-1969; VIETNAM 1969-1970; VIETNAM 1971
Philippine Republic Presidential Unit Citation		17 OCTOBER 1944 TO 4 JULY 1945
Republic of Vietnam Cross of Gallantry with Palm		VIETNAM 1967-1968 VIETNAM 1969; VIETNAM 1970-1971
Republic of Vietnam Civil Actions Honor Medal, First Class		VIETNAM 1967-1969

Separate Campaign Credit and Decorations for Company B, 109th Military Intelligence Battalion

Conflict/Decoration	Streamer/Device	Inscription
World War II European Theater		TUNISIA 1942-1943 SICILY 1943; NORMANDY 1944; NORTHERN FRANCE 1944; RHINELAND 1944-1945; ARDENNES-ALSACE 1944-1945; CENTRAL EUROPE 1945
Vietnam		VIETNAM COUNTEROFFENSIVE, PHASE II 1966-1967 VIETNAM COUNTEROFFENSIVE, PHASE III 1967-1968; TET COUNTEROFFENSIVE 1968; VIETNAM COUNTEROFFENSIVE, PHASE IV 1968; VIETNAM COUNTEROFFENSIVE, PHASE V 1968; VIETNAM COUNTEROFFENSIVE, PHASE VI, 1968-1969; TET 69/COUNTEROFFENSIVE, 1969; VIETNAM SUMMER-FALL 1969
Meritorious Unit Commendation		VIETNAM 1968
Belgian Fourragere 1940		
Cited in the Order of the Day of the Belgian Army	Action at the Meuese River Action in the Ardennes	
Republic of Vietnam Cross of Gallantry with Palm		VIETNAM 1966-1968 VIETNAM 1969
Republic of Vietnam Civil Actions Honor Medal, First Class		VIETNAM 1966-1969
