= Task Force 121 =

U.S. military unit in the 2003 invasion of Iraq

Task Force 121 TF121
- Active: 2003 – 2006
- Country: United States of America
- Type: United States Department of Defense special operations task force
- Role: Multi-service force for apprehension of high-value targets
- Engagements: Iraq War; Firefight and deaths of Uday and Qusay Hussein (21 July 2003); Operation Red Dawn - capture of Saddam Hussein (13 December 2003)

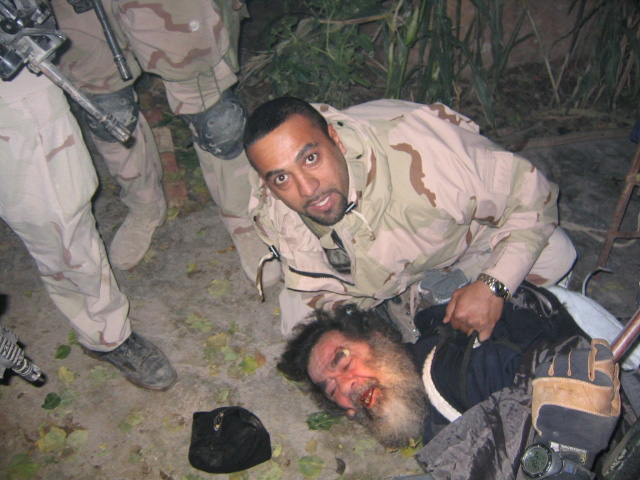
Samir, an Iraqi-American military interpreter of Task Force 121, helped find Saddam Hussein by pulling him out of hideaway in December 2003.

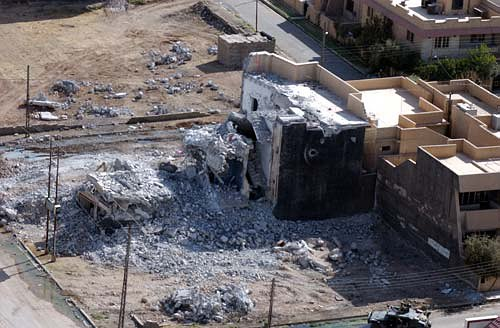
House of Uday and Qusay Hussein in Mosul, Iraq destroyed by members of Task Force 121 in July 2003

Task Force 121 was a United States Department of Defense special operations task force.

== History ==
TF121 was a combination of the now defunct Task Force 5 and Task Force 20, which operated in Afghanistan and Iraq respectively. Acting on the apparent logistic redundancy of keeping two separate task force teams for Iraq and Afghanistan, General John Abizaid decided to combine both teams into a single streamlined force, forming the TF121. The force was approximately 1,500 soldiers with its own support capabilities.

Task Force 20's primary goal was to capture or kill "High-value targets" (HVTs), such as Iraqi Mujahideen leaders and former Ba'ath party regime members and leaders. Task Force 20 operators were directly involved in the 4-hour firefight between 101st Airborne soldiers and Saddam Hussein's sons, Uday and Qusay Hussein. The two sons were killed in the shootout. The apprehending of the most wanted man in Iraq, Saddam Hussein, in Operation Red Dawn directly involved Task Force 121 operators and members of the Army's 4th Infantry Division.

Task Force 20 was also involved in what the US military calls a tragic accident on 27 July 2003. At least three Iraqis were killed in western Baghdad's Mansour district, when US soldiers from Task Force 20 opened fire on cars that overshot a military cordon. The drivers apparently had missed the cordon when they turned into the area from an unblocked side street.

=== Mission ===
TF121's primary mission was the apprehension of High Value Targets and was organized in such a way that it has a close relationship with intelligence personnel and has access to any relevant data gathered by intelligence assets in the area. Such an option is important to Special Operations teams, and especially so to one whose primary mission is hunting fugitives whose hideouts change frequently and randomly.

Many TF121 groups were assigned Special Operations CIRA (Communications Intelligence Reconnaissance and Action) personnel with expertise in relevant fields. These operators work closely with the intelligence agencies tied to TF121 and work to pinpoint and identify HVTs aggressively.

=== Achievements ===
On 21 July 2003, Saddam's sons Uday and Qusay were killed in a firefight with TF20 operators and soldiers from 101st Airborne. On 13 December 2003, Operation Red Dawn netted HVT #1, Saddam Hussein. After intelligence narrowed down the target to two possible locations, TF121 coordinated the raid with 600 soldiers from the 4th Infantry Division's 1st Brigade Combat Team and Golf Troop 10th Cavalry Regiment (Reconnaissance troop), 4th Brigade, 1st Armored Division.

== Detainee abuse ==
According to an internal army investigation leaked to The Washington Post, Task Force 121 was responsible for the illegal abuse of detainees in secret interrogation facilities in Iraq. In 2006, after the unit had changed its name to Task Force 6-26, a Human Rights Watch report recorded evidence of continued abuse, including beatings and waterboarding.

== See also ==
- Iraqi insurgency (2003–2011)
- Joint Special Operations Command Task Force in the Iraq War
- U.S. list of 55 most-wanted Iraqis
- Task Force ODIN
