= Operation Hope =

There are a number of military operations with names similar to Operation Hope. They are, chronologically:

- Operation Mount Hope III, 1988 US mission to capture a crashed Mi-24
- Operation Provide Hope, 1992 US Navy humanitarian mission
- Operation Restore Hope, 1992-3 US operation in Somalia
- Operation Support Hope, 1994 US military relief mission
- Operation Shining Hope, 1999 US humanitarian contribution to Operation Allied Harbour
- Operation Omaid (Hope), 2010 ISAF/Afghan operation

It may also refer to:

- Operation HOPE, Inc., an American non-profit organization providing economic education
- Operation New Hope, an education program in Ladakh, India
