= Lubbock Arts Festival =

- Genre: Arts festival
- Date: April
- Frequency: Annual
- Venue: Lubbock Memorial Civic Center
- Location: Lubbock, Texas
- Inaugurated: 1978
- Attendance: >30,000 (2013)
- Website: www.lubbockartsfestival.org

The Lubbock Arts Festival is an annual arts festival held in April at the Lubbock Memorial Civic Center in Lubbock, Texas. The festival is the largest fine arts and crafts show in West Texas. Since its establishment in 1978, the Lubbock Arts Festival focuses on visual, performing, culinary, and children's art. The 2013 Lubbock Arts Festival drew a record attendance of over 30,000. In 2014, the Silent Wings Museum participated in the festival.

A virtual festival was created in 2020, caused by the COVID-19 pandemic.
