= TG-4A =

TG-4A may refer to:

- Schweizer SGS 2-33, a glider used by the United States Air Force Academy, by 1962 United States Tri-Service aircraft designation
- Laister-Kauffman TG-4A, a glider used by the United States Army Air Force in World War II
