= Southern Museum of Flight =

Aviation museum in Birmingham, Alabama, USA

- Location in Alabama Southern Museum of Flight (the United States)
- Established: 1966
- Location: 4343 73rd Street North; Birmingham, Alabama 35206
- Coordinates: 33.56348°N 86.73806°W
- Founder: Mary Alice Beatty
- Director: Dr. Brian J. Barsanti
- Website: www.southernmuseumofflight.org

The Southern Museum of Flight is a civilian aviation museum Birmingham, Alabama. The facility features nearly 100 aircraft, as well as engines, models, artifacts, photographs, and paintings. In addition, the Southern Museum of Flight is home to the Alabama Aviation Hall of Fame, which presents Alabama Aviation History through collective biography.

== Overview ==
The Lake Murray B-25C Mitchell bomber crashed in South Carolina during a 1943 training exercise. The right engine was torn off during the crash but the crew was able to escape unharmed before it sank to a depth of 150 feet (46m). The aircraft became a dive site for local technical divers until it was raised from the depths of the lake in September 2005. Dr. Bob Seigler, who spearheaded the project, John Hodge and Dr. Bill Vartorella, formed the Lake Murray B-25 Rescue Project to salvage the aircraft from the bottom of the lake. After recovery the remains of the aircraft were moved to the Southern Museum of Flight for conservation and museum display. A video crew, including maritime video experts from Nautilus Productions, documented the recovery for the Mega Movers series on the History Channel.

Featured on display is a diorama exhibit honoring Alabama's famed Tuskegee Airmen, as well as the Korean War Jets Exhibit and Vietnam War Helicopters Exhibit.

The museum received a Hind and an An-2 in April 2012.

The museum is currently on the grounds of the Birmingham–Shuttlesworth International Airport but plans to reopen at the Grand River Technology Park.

In 2017, the museum announced plans to move to the Barber Motorsports Park. In 2023, after delays, the museum stated that it was going to retain its original campus, although it would continue to move forward with plans for the new location as an expansion.

== Selected aircraft on display ==
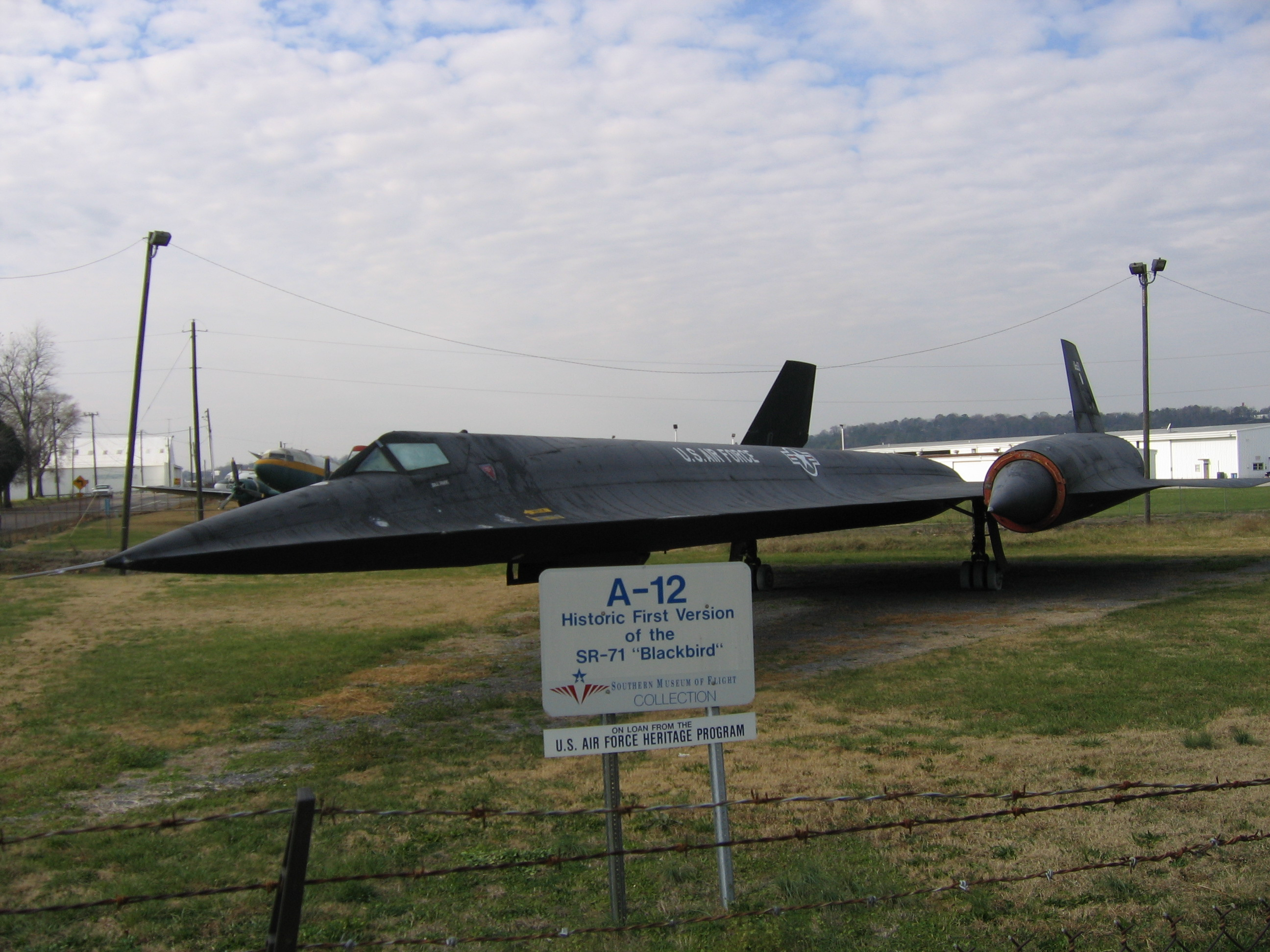
Lockheed A-12

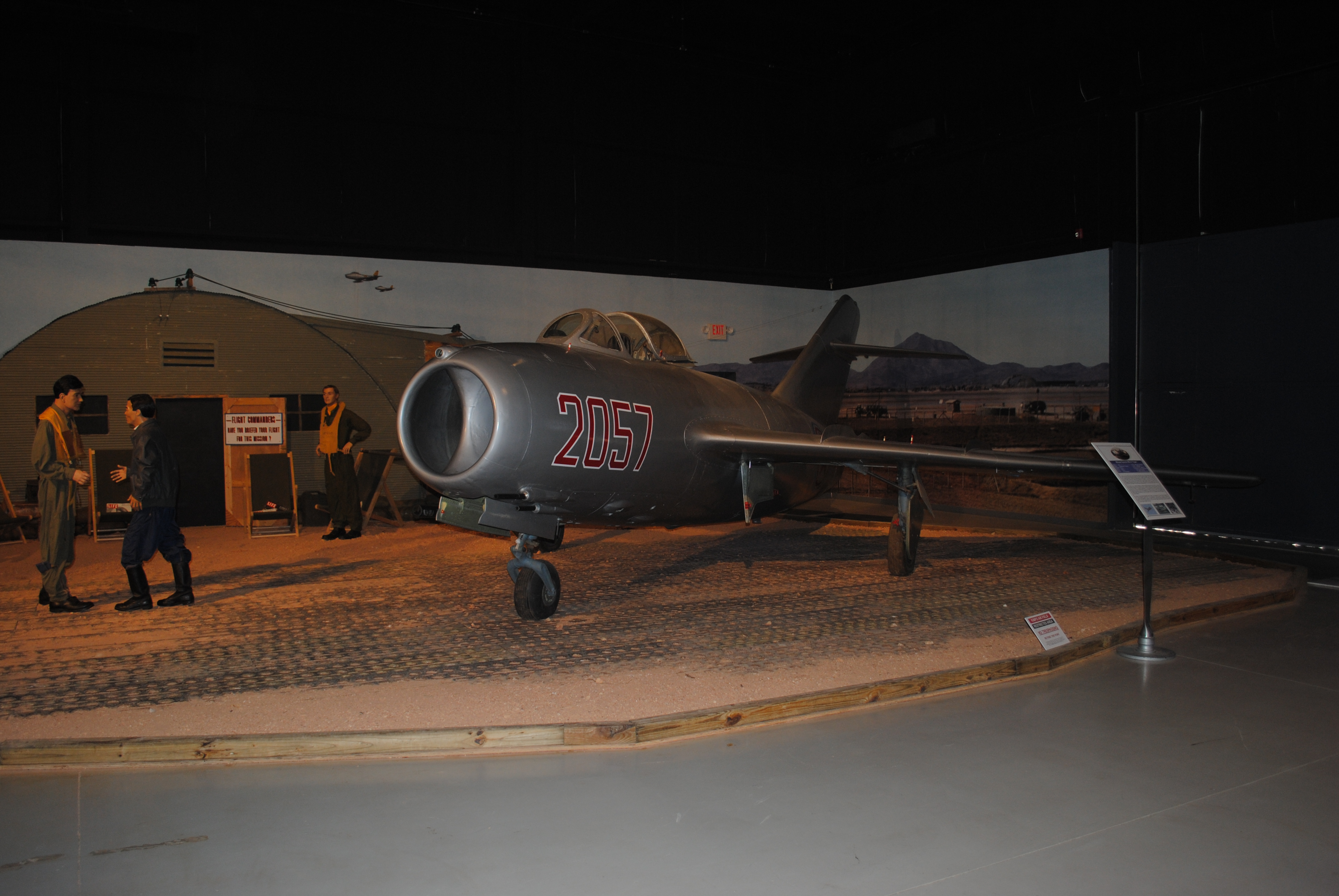
MiG 15

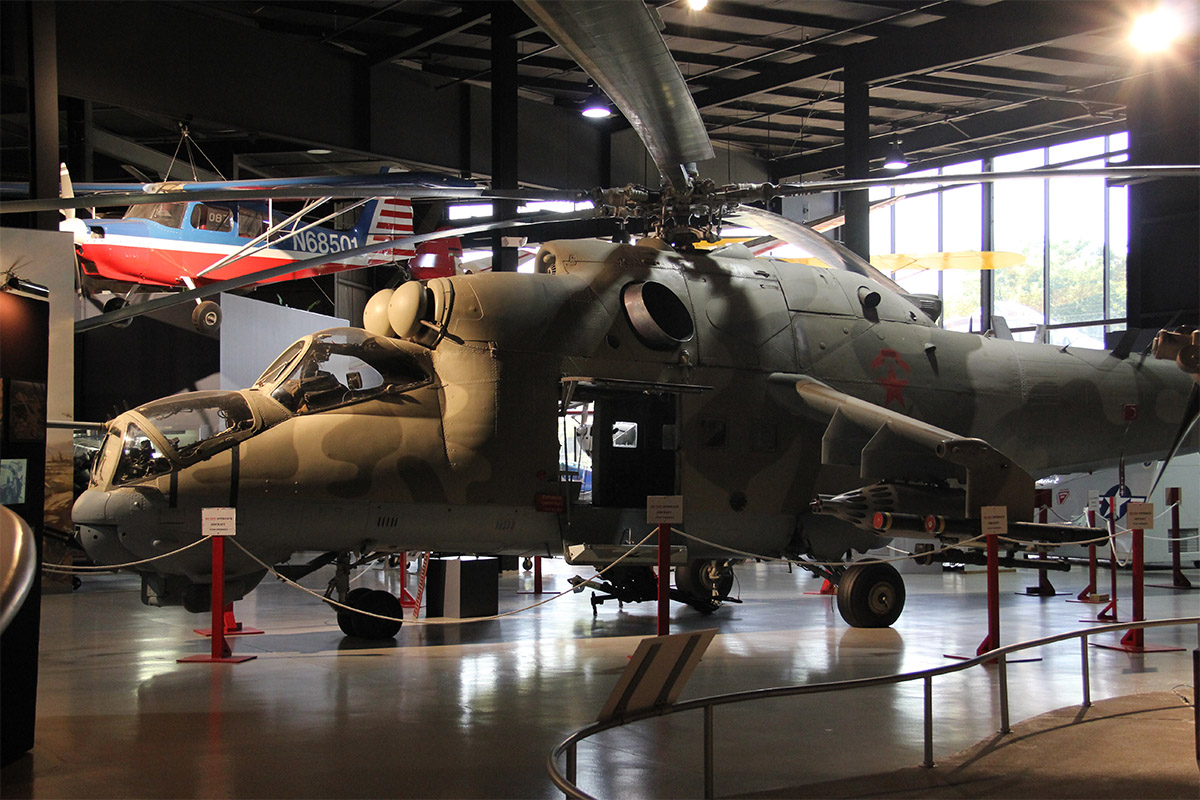
Mi-25 captured in Operation Mount Hope III

Military aircraft

- Douglas B-26 Invader
- Fairchild PT-19
- Fokker D.VII
- Grumman F-14 Tomcat
- Hughes OH-6 Cayuse
- Lockheed A-12
- Lockheed T-33A Shooting Star
- McDonnell F-101 Voodoo
- McDonnell Douglas F-4 Phantom II
- Mikoyan-Gurevich MiG-15
- North American B-25C Mitchell
- North American F-86 Sabre
- North American T-6G Texan
- Republic F-84F Thunderstreak
- Vultee BT-13B Valiant

Civilian aircraft

- Aero Commander 680
- Aeronca K
- Aeronca Sedan on floats
- Bede BD-4
- Bede BD-5B
- Beagle B.206
- Beechcraft Starship
- Cessna 337B Skymaster
- Cumulus 2F Glider
- Curtiss Model D
  replica
- Davis DA-2A
- Heath Super Parasol
- Huff-Daland crop duster
- Laister-Kauffman 10A
- Monnett Sonerai II-LT
- Pazmany PL-4A
- Piel Emeraude
- Piper PA-28-140 Cherokee Cruiser
- Republic RC-3 Seabee
- Rotec Rally
- Rutan VariViggen
- Sport Fury
- Stoddard-Hamilton Glasair II FT
- Stinson 10A
- Stinson SR-5
- Stolp Starduster
- Wright Flyer
  replica
