= 160th Special Operations Aviation Regiment (Airborne) =

U.S. Army helicopter unit

- Regimental distinctive unit insignia
- Country: United States of America
- Branch: United States Army
- Type: Special operations aviation
- Size: 2,700
- Part of: United States Army Special Operations Aviation Command; United States Army Special Operations Command; United States Special Operations Command
- Garrison/HQ: Fort Campbell, Kentucky, U.S.
- Nicknames: "Night Stalkers", "160th SOAR(A)", "Task Force Brown"
- Motto: "Night Stalkers Don't Quit!"
- Color of berets: Maroon
- Engagements: Invasion of Grenada; Operation Mount Hope III; Operation Earnest Will; Operation Prime Chance; Invasion of Panama; Persian Gulf War; Somali Civil War; Operation Restore Hope; Operation Gothic Serpent; Global War on Terrorism; Operation Enduring Freedom; Battle of Takur Ghar; Operation Red Wings; Iraq War; Operation Inherent Resolve; Operation Kayla Mueller; Al-Qaeda insurgency in Yemen; Operation Freedom's Sentinel; 2025 United States military campaign against cartels; Operation Southern Spear; Operation Absolute Resolve; 2026 Iran War; 2026 United States F-15E rescue operation in Iran

The 160th Special Operations Aviation Regiment (Airborne), abbreviated as 160th SOAR(A), is a special operations force of the United States Army that provides helicopter aviation support for special operations forces. Its missions have included attack, assault, and reconnaissance, and these missions are usually conducted at night, at high speeds, low altitudes, and on short notice.

Nicknamed the Night Stalkers and called Task Force Brown within the JSOC, the 160th SOAR(A) is headquartered at Fort Campbell, Kentucky.

== Overview ==
The 160th SOAR(A) consists of some of the Army's best-qualified aviators, crew chiefs, and support soldiers. Officers are all volunteers; enlisted soldiers volunteer or are assigned by the U.S. Army Human Resources Command. Until 2013, only men were allowed to be pilots in the 160th.

Upon joining the 160th, all soldiers are assigned to "Green Platoon", in which they receive intensive training in "advanced methods of the five basic combat skills: first responder, land navigation, combatives, weapons and teamwork". The weapons training includes firing thousands of rounds with M4/M4A1 carbines and SIG Sauer M17/M18 pistols.

Soldiers who fail the course the first time may retake it, but there is no guarantee that anyone assigned to Green Platoon will pass and continue on with the 160th. The basic Night Stalker course for enlisted soldiers lasts five weeks. The officer course lasts 20 to 28 weeks.

A new Night Stalker pilot arrives at a unit as Basic Mission Qualified (BMQ). After a series of skills test qualifications, experience, leadership, and oral review boards lasting up to three years, the Night Stalker is designated Fully Mission Qualified (FMQ). After three to five years as an FMQ, the Night Stalker may be nominated and assessed by a long process consisting of several flight evaluations to earn the flight lead qualification.

SOAR flight medics can qualify as special operations combat medics by completing the 36-week Special Operations Combat Medic (SOCM) course at Fort Bragg.

== History ==
=== 1980s and 1990s ===
After the April 1980 Operation Eagle Claw attempt to rescue American hostages held in Tehran, Iran, failed, President Jimmy Carter ordered former Chief of Naval Operations Adm. James L. Holloway III to determine how the U.S. military could best mount another attempt. At the time there were no U.S. helicopter units trained in this kind of stealthy, short-notice Special Operations mission.

The Army looked to the 101st Aviation Group, the air arm of the 101st Airborne Division (Air Assault), which had the most diverse operating experience of the service's helicopter units, and selected elements of the 158th Aviation Battalion, 101st Aviation Battalion, 229th Aviation Battalion, and the 159th Aviation Battalion. The chosen pilots immediately entered intensive training in night flying.

This provisional unit was dubbed Task Force 158, since most of its pilots were Black Hawk aviators detached from the 158th. Their distinctive 101st "Screaming Eagle" patches remained on their uniforms. The Black Hawks and Chinooks continued to operate around Campbell Army Airfield at the north of the post, and Saber Army Heliport at the south. OH-6 Cayuses, aircraft that had vanished from the division after Vietnam, were hidden on base in an ammunition holding area still known as the "SHOC Pad", for "Special Helicopter Operations Company".

As the first batch of pilots completed training in the fall of 1980, a second attempt to rescue the hostages was planned for early 1981. Dubbed Operation Honey Badger, it was called off when the hostages were released on the morning of President Ronald Reagan's inauguration.

Task Force 158 was the Army's only special operations aviation unit, and its members had already become recognized as the Army's premier aviation night fighters. Their capability was judged too useful to lose, and so instead of returning to the 101st, the pilots and modified aircraft became a new unit. Original members of the Night Stalkers refer to it as "the day the Eagles came off".

They were originally created as Task Force 160, when the 101st Airborne Division was commanded by Jack V. Mackmull from June 1980 to August 1981. When the command was formally organized as a regiment, Mackmull was chosen to serve as its honorary colonel.

The unit was officially established on 16 October 1981, when it was designated the 160th Aviation Battalion.

In 1983, the 160th first saw combat during Operation Urgent Fury, the U.S. invasion of Grenada.

In 1986, it was renamed the 160th Aviation Group (Airborne). In May 1990, their name changed to the 160th Special Operations Aviation Regiment (Airborne). As demand for highly trained special operations aviation assets bloomed, the regiment activated three battalions, a separate detachment, and incorporated one Army National Guard unit, the 1st Battalion, 245th Aviation (OK ARNG).

In 1987 and 1988, its pilots took part in Operation Earnest Will, the protection of re-flagged Kuwaiti tankers in the Persian Gulf during the Iran–Iraq War. They flew from US Navy warships and leased oil barges in a secret sub-part called Operation Prime Chance. They became the first helicopter pilots to use night vision goggles and forward looking infrared (FLIR) devices in night combat.

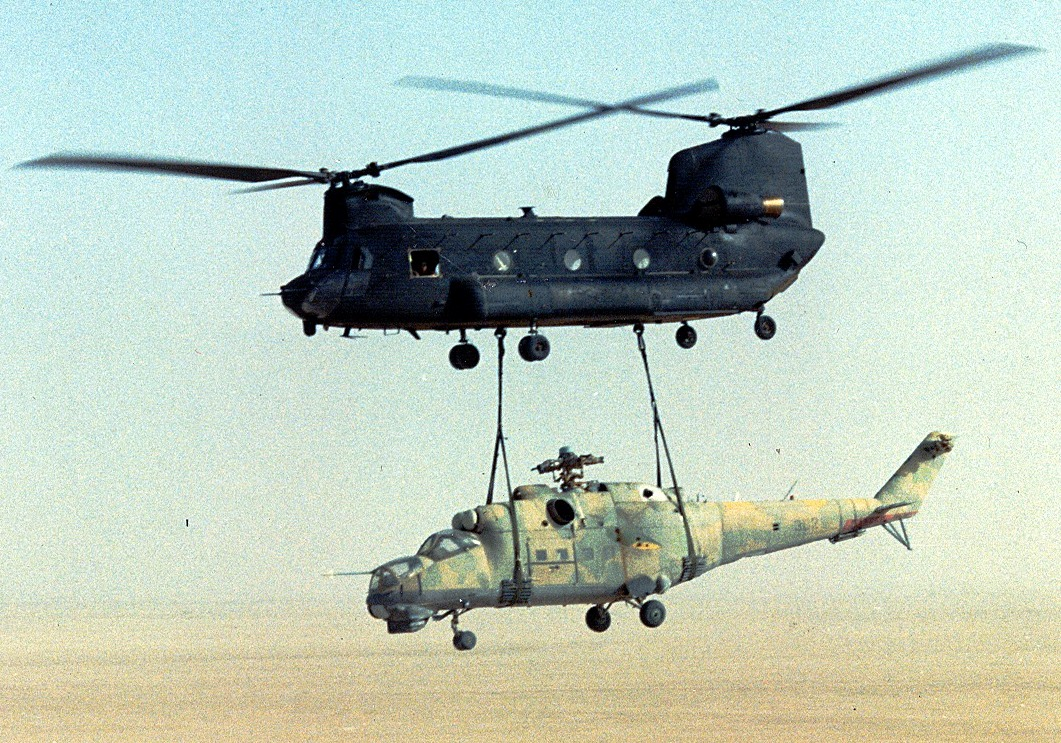
The regiment's Company E fly the slingloaded Mil Mi-24 out of Chad, known as Operation Mount Hope III

In June 1988, the unit received a short-notice directive to recover a Soviet made Mi-25 Hind (Mi-24 Hind export version) attack helicopter from a remote location in Chad. The Hind was abandoned by the Libyans after 15 years of fighting, and was of great intelligence value to the U.S. In April 1988, two CH-47 Chinooks, a U.S. Air Force C-5 Galaxy, and 75 maintenance personnel and crew flew to White Sands AFB, New Mexico, to rehearse the mission. In late May 1988, an advance team went to Ndjamena, Chad, to await their aircraft.

Two weeks later, two Chinooks and 76 crew members and maintenance personnel arrived by C-5. At midnight on 11 June 1988, two MH-47s flew 490 miles at night without outside navigational aids to the target location, the Ouadi Doum Airfield in northern Chad. The first Chinook landed and configured the Hind, while the second hovered overhead and sling loaded it for return to Ndjamena. A surprise sandstorm slowed the return trip, but less than 67 hours after the arrival of the C-5 in Chad, the ground crew had the Hind and Chinooks aboard and ready for return to the U.S.

In 1989, the Night Stalkers spearheaded Operation Just Cause, the invasion of Panama.

In 1991, they participated in Iraq, during Operation Desert Storm.

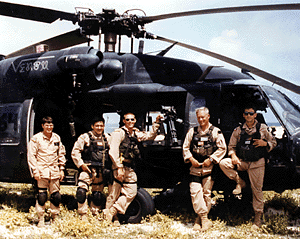
Super Six-Four one month before the Battle of Mogadishu. From left: Winn Mahuron, Tommy Field, Bill Cleveland, Ray Frank and Michael Durant.

In October 1993 in Somalia, Night Stalkers fought in the Battle of Mogadishu, which became the subject of the book Black Hawk Down and its film adaptation. Two Night Stalker Black Hawks were shot down in the battle: Super 6–1, piloted by Cliff Wolcott, and Super 6–4, piloted by Mike Durant. Five of the eighteen men killed (not counting a nineteenth post-operation casualty) during the battle were members of the Night Stalkers team, who were lost along with the two aircraft.

=== Global war on terrorism ===
==== 2001–2005 ====
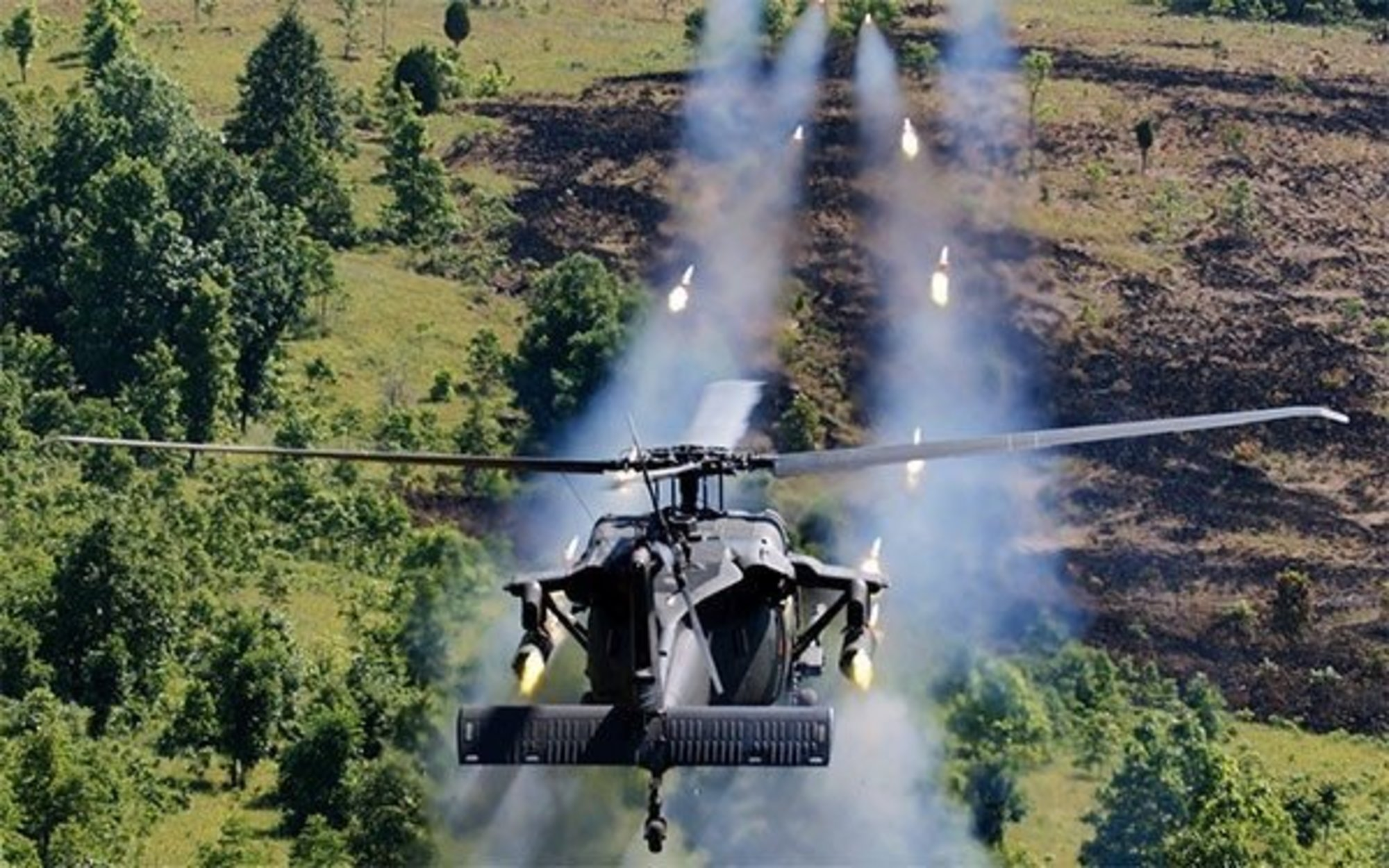
An MH-60L DAP fires its 2.75 in (7.0 cm) rockets on a U.S. test range.

During the 2001 invasion of Afghanistan, the Night Stalkers from 2nd Battalion supported two task forces established in early October 2001: Dagger and Sword. Their unit in TF Sword was designated Task Force Brown. In the evening of 18 October into 19 October 2001, two SOAR MH-47E helicopters, escorted by MH-60L (Direct Action Penetrators) (DAPs), airlifted U.S. troops from the Karshi-Khanabad Air Base in Uzbekistan more than 300 kilometers (190 mi) across the 16,000-foot (4,900 m) Hindu Kush mountains into Afghanistan.

The pilots of the Chinooks, flying in zero-visibility conditions, were refueled in flight three times during the 11-hour mission, establishing a new world record for combat rotorcraft. The troops—two 12-man Green Beret teams from the 5th Special Forces Group dubbed Operational Detachment Alpha (ODA) 555 and 595 plus four Air Force Combat Controllers—linked up with the CIA and Northern Alliance. Within a few weeks, the Northern Alliance, assisted by U.S. ground and air forces, captured several key cities from the Taliban.

In November 2001, Night Stalker AH-6J Little Birds took part in Objective Wolverine and Raptor missions and Operation Relentless Strike. In December 2001, Night Stalker crews resupplied more than 150 Delta Force, British Special Boat Service, and CIA Special Activities Division operatives as they hunted for Osama bin Laden in the Tora Bora mountain complex.

On 21 February 2002, while scouting Islamist terrorists on Basilan Island as part of Operation Enduring Freedom – Philippines and seeking to rescue a nurse and an American missionary couple, a MH-47 crashed at sea in the southern Philippines' Bohol Strait, killing 10 servicemen (eight from E company, 160th SOAR and two from the 353rd Special Operations Group).

In March 2002, Night Stalkers from B Company, 2nd Battalion, 160th SOAR supported coalition troops during Operation Anaconda. At the Battle of Takur Ghar on 4 March, one of their MH-47Es, callsign Razor 03, was damaged by rocket-propelled grenades and crash-landed carrying Mako 30. A second MH-47E, callsign Razor 01, responded with a Quick Reaction Force; it was damaged by small arms and rocket-propelled grenades, and crash-landed. One Night Stalker was killed in the battle.

In June 2002 in the Philippines, Night Stalker MH-47Es were involved in the operation that killed Abu Sabaya, a senior leader in Abu Sayyaf. A U.S. Predator drone marked Sabaya with an infrared laser as he tried to escape in a smuggler's boat. The MH-47Es trained searchlights on the boat while operators from the Philippine Naval Special Operations Group opened fire, killing the terrorist leader and capturing four other terrorists with him.

Later in 2002, in Afghanistan, Task Force 11 (previously known as Task Force Sword but renamed in January 2002) was composed of DEVGRU and a company of Rangers, and was supported by a company of helicopters from the 160th SOAR.

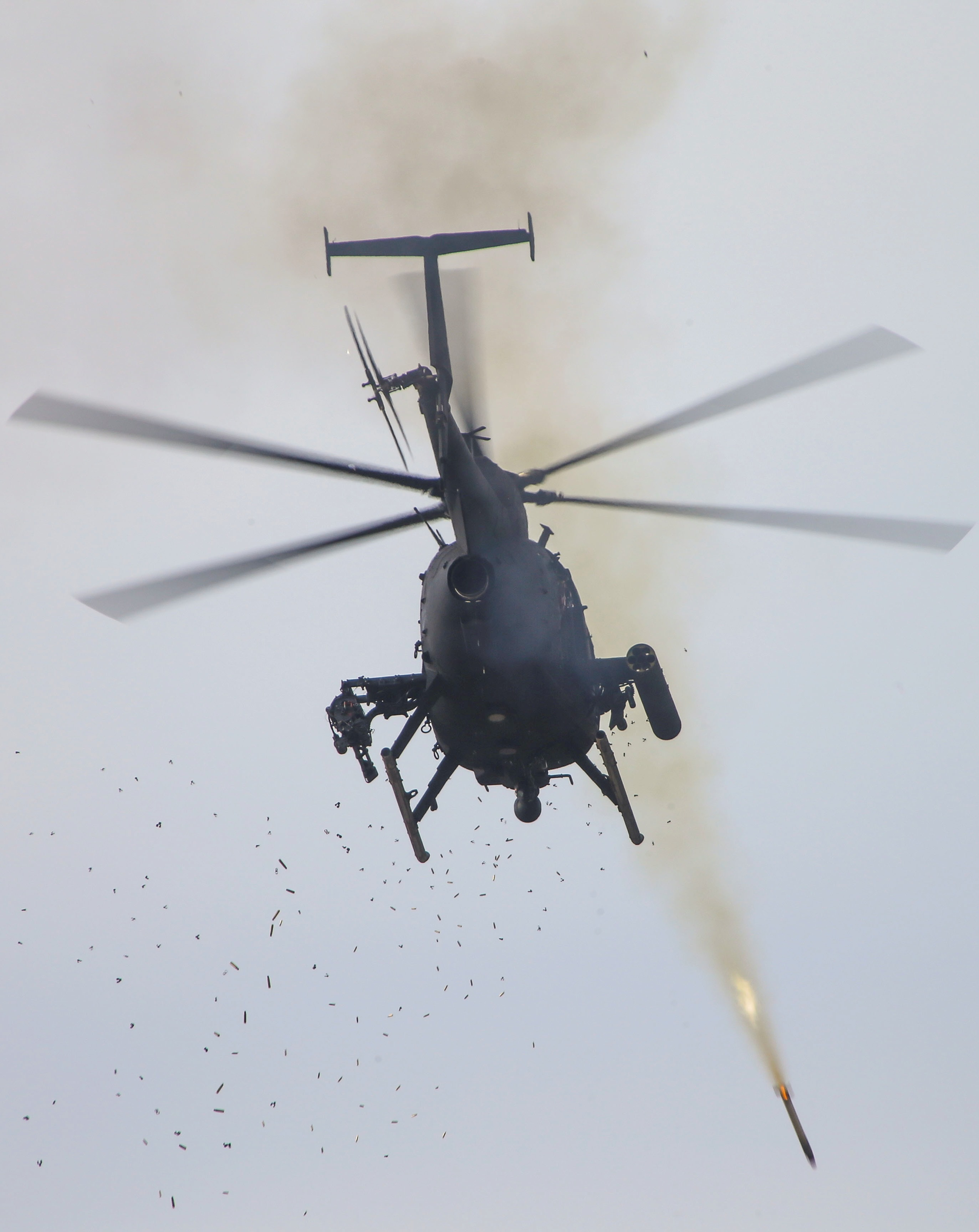
An AH-6M attacks designated targets during an offensive air support exercise with the USMC's MAWTS-1.

During the 2003 invasion of Iraq, 3rd Battalion, 160th SOAR, deployed as the Joint Special Operations Air Detachment-West under CJSOTF-West (Combined Joint Special Operations Task Force-West/Task Force Dagger). It was equipped with eight MH-47E Chinooks, four MH-60L DAPs, and two MH-60L Black Hawks. At 9 p.m. on 19 March 2003, the first strike of Operation Iraqi Freedom was carried out by members of the 160th SOAR, on Iraqi visual observation posts along the southern and western borders of Iraq. The strike groups included one flight of MH-60L DAPs and four "Black Swarm" flights, each consisting of a pair of AH-6M Little Birds; a FLIR-equipped, target-spotting MH-6M; and a pair of U.S. Air Force A-10As.

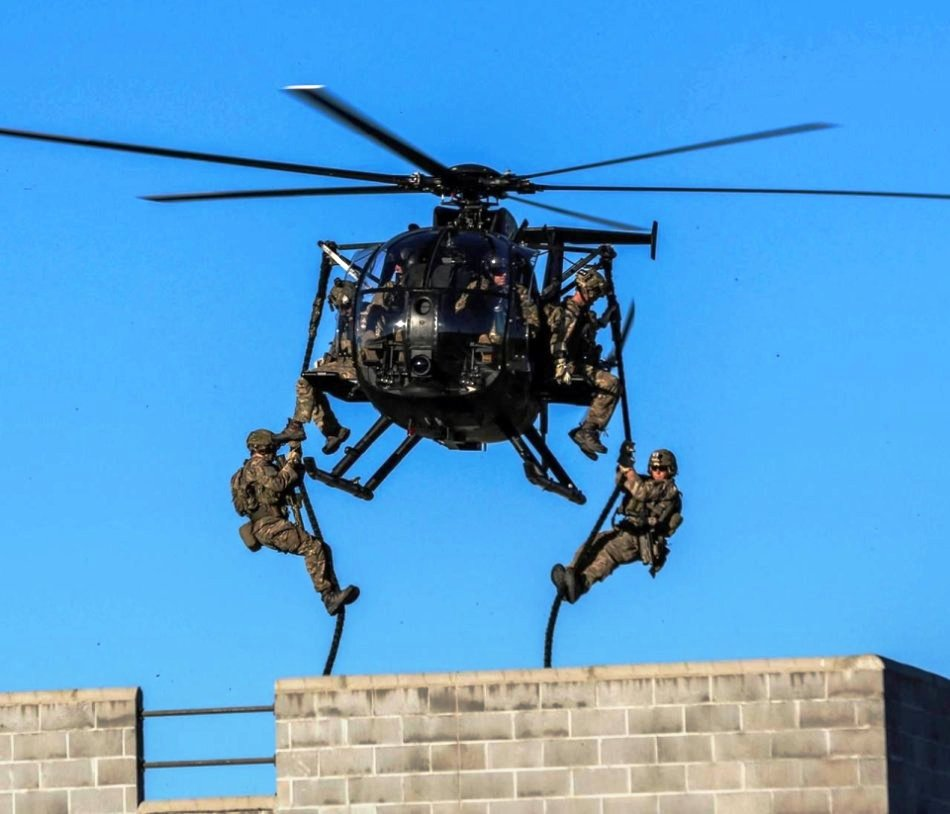
An MH-6M insert a team of Rangers atop a building using the Fast Rope Insertion Extraction System (FRIES).

In seven hours, more than 70 sites were destroyed, effectively depriving the Iraqi military of any early warning of the coming invasion. As the sites were eliminated, the first heliborne SOF teams launched from H-5 airbase in Jordan, including vehicle-mounted patrols from the British and Australian special forces, who were transported by the MH-47Es of the 160th SOAR. Night Stalkers from 1st Battalion 160th SOAR, they were based at Ar'Ar, supported Task Force 20 with MH-60L/K Black Hawks, MH-60L DAPs, MH-6M transport, and AH-6M Little Birds. On 26 March, the 160th SOAR took part in the Objective Beaver mission, a raid by DEVGRU on al Qadisiyah Research Centre, which was suspected to have stocks of chemical and biological weapons.

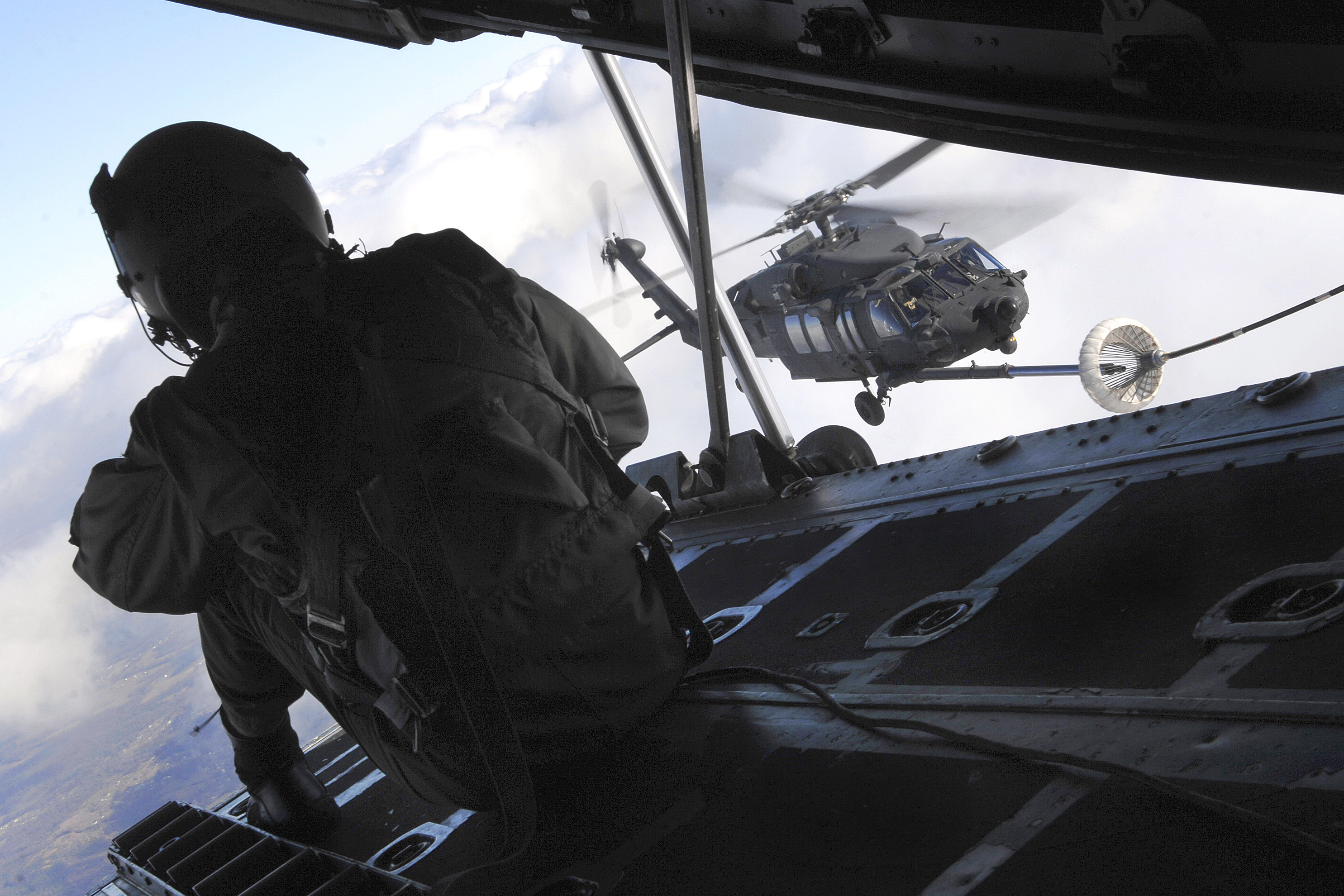
An MH-60K conducts air-refueling with an AFSOC MC-130J Commando II.

On 1 April 2003, the 160th SOAR took part in the rescue of PFC Jessica Lynch, who had been taken prisoner during the Battle of Nasiriyah. On 2 April, a Delta Force squadron operating in Iraq was ambushed by a half-dozen armed technicals from an anti-special forces Fedayeen. Two MH-60K Black Hawks carrying a parajumper medical team and two MH-60L DAPs of the 160th SOAR responded and engaged the Iraqis, which allowed the Delta operators to move their two casualties to an emergency HLZ. One Delta Force operator succumbed to his wounds.

On the evening of 13 December 2003, Saddam Hussein was captured by U.S. forces in Operation Red Dawn. He was exfiltrated by a MH-6 Little Bird from the 160th SOAR and he was taken into custody at Baghdad International Airport.

In 2004, they took part in the rescue of three Italian contractors and one Polish businessman held for ransom by Iraqi insurgents.

In Afghanistan in 2005, eight Night Stalkers (four from HHC and four from Bravo company of 3rd Battalion) were killed along with eight Navy SEALs on a rescue mission for Marcus Luttrell, after their MH-47 Chinook helicopter was hit by a rocket propelled grenade. They were sent out to look for Luttrell after Operation Red Wings, in which he was involved with three other SEALs, was compromised and Luttrell's teammates killed.

==== 2006–2009 ====
In March 2006, SEALs from DEVGRU and Rangers were flown by the 160th SOAR into in North Waziristan, Pakistan, to assault an al-Qaeda training camp, allegedly under the codename: Operation Vigilant Harvest, the assaulters killed as many as 30 terrorists including the camp's commandant.

On 14 May 2006, helicopters from the 160th SOAR brought operators from Delta Force's B Squadron to Yusufiyah, Iraq, to fight al-Qaeda fighters in several buildings. As the operators disembarked their helicopters, they came under fire from a nearby house, and more al-Qaeda fighters soon joined the firefight. The door gunners of the 160th's Black Hawks fired at the insurgents; a pair of AH-6M Little Birds carried out strafing runs. One Little Bird from the 160th's 1st Battalion, B Company, was shot down. An estimated 25 al-Qaeda fighters were killed.

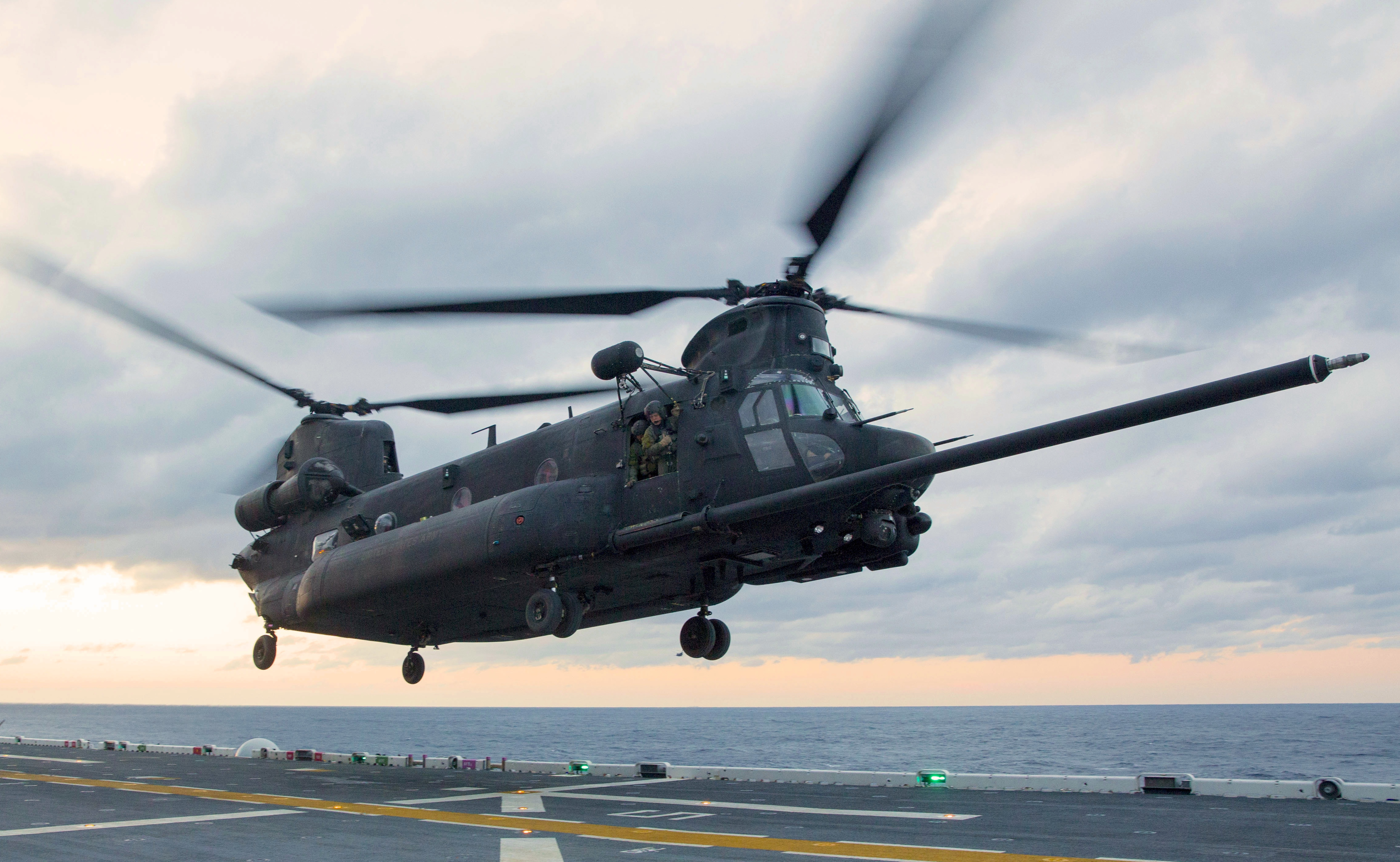
An MH-47E from the regiment lands aboard the USS Kearsarge (LHD-3).

In July 2006, a pair of MH-47Es from 160th SOAR attempted to insert a combined strike element of DEVGRU, Rangers, and Afghan commandos in Helmand Province, Afghanistan, to attack a compound. With some troops on the ground, a large insurgent force ambushed them. Both helicopters were struck by small arms fire. One MH-47E pilot put his aircraft in the line of fire to protect the other MH-47E as its assault team disembarked. An RPG hit the shielding MH-47E, whose pilot crash-landed with no serious injuries to operators or aircrew. The Ranger commander and an attached 2nd Commando Regiment operator organised an all-round defence while the other MH-47E held back the advancing insurgents until its miniguns ran out of ammunition. An AC-130 Spectre joined the battle and kept the down crew and passengers safe until a British Immediate Response Team helicopter recovered them. The AC-130 then destroyed the MH-47E wreck, denying it to the Taliban.

Elements of 3rd Battalion 160th SOAR have conducted episodic deployments in support of Operation Enduring Freedom—Caribbean and Central America, begun in 2008. Night Stalker helicopters were present during the 2008 SOCOM counter-terror exercises in Denver. On 24 April 2008, Company D, 3rd Battalion, 160th SOAR was inactivated at a ceremony conducted at Hunter Army Airfield, Georgia, as part of a regimental transformation plan. The 160th SOAR also took part in the 2008 Abu Kamal raid.

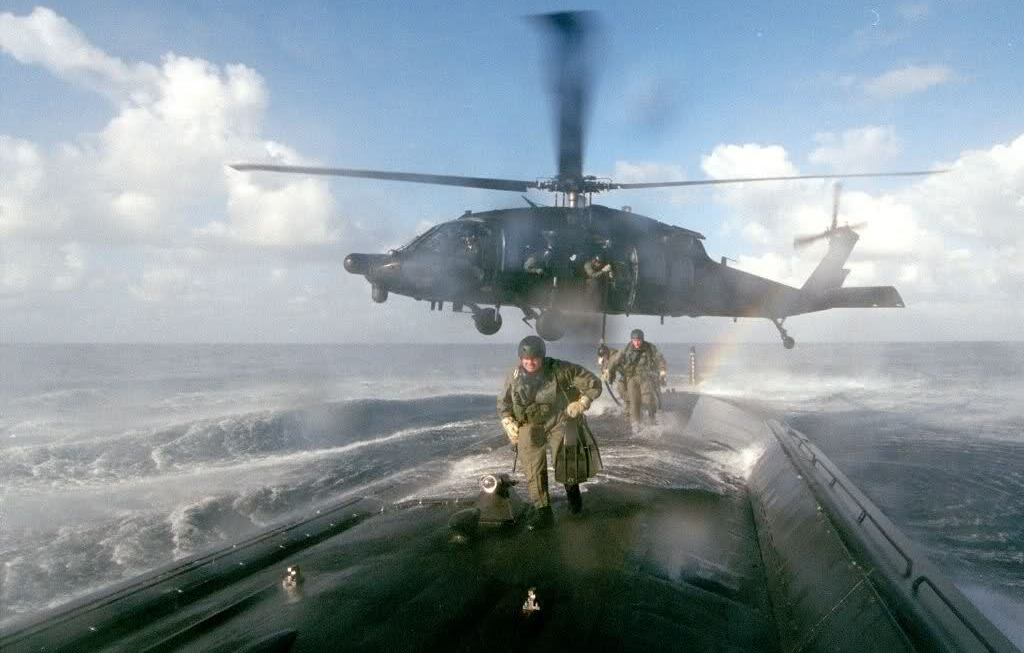
An MH-60L deploys an ODA from 7th Special Forces Group onto the deck of a U.S. Navy submarine.

On 19 August 2009, four Night Stalkers from D Company, 1st Battalion, 160th SOAR lost their lives in a MH-60 Black Hawk helicopter crash in Leadville, Colorado, during mountain and environmental training. On 9 September 2009 in Afghanistan, Night Stalkers inserted the British SBS and SFSG into Kunduz Province to rescue Times journalist Stephen Farrell after he and his Afghan interpreter were captured by the Taliban.

In September 2009 in Somalia, the Night Stalkers took part in Operation Celestial Balance, whose target was a senior terrorist leader connected to al-Qaeda affiliated organizations. The assault force (4 AH-6M Little Birds and 4 MH-60L Black Hawks) carried in DEVGRU operators to kill or capture the leader. AH-6Ms strafed the two-vehicle convoy, killing the leader along with three other al-Shabaab terrorists, then carried out an overwatch while DEVGRU cleared the vehicles and recovered the body.

On 22 October 2009, a 3rd Battalion helicopter crashed into the USNS Arctic during a joint training exercise involving fast roping about 20 miles off Fort Story, Virginia. The crash killed a soldier, Sergeant First Class James R. Stright, 29, and injured eight others, three seriously.

=== 2010–2020 ===
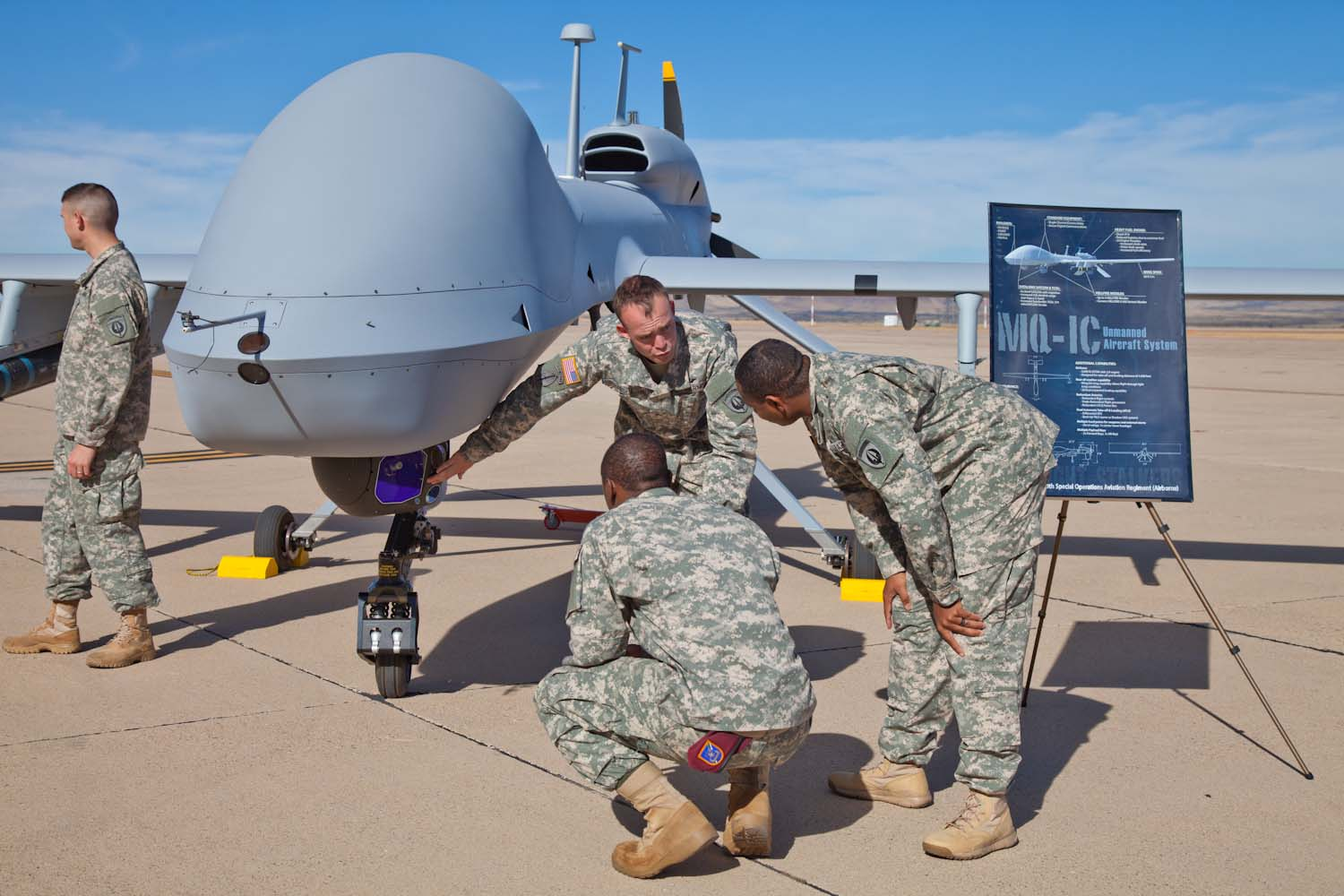
The Regiment's E Company gets a tutorial of the MQ-1C Gray Eagles.

In May 2011, the Night Stalkers took part in the raid on Osama bin Laden's compound. The operation involved flying covertly into Abbottabad, Pakistan in a pair of MH-60 Black Hawk helicopters, specially modified for stealth and piloted by the 160th SOAR, to take a team of Navy SEALs directly to bin Laden's compound. While one of the helicopters crash landed on arrival, all on board survived.

The SEALs were successfully inserted onto the property while the crew was able to extract themselves, provide cover for the SEALs and then leave on the other helicopter. The mission was overall considered a success. The dramatic nighttime raid was "painstakingly recreated" in the film Zero Dark Thirty, which covers the CIA's efforts to track down bin Laden, from just after the September 11th attacks to the daring raid ten years later.

On 28 May 2012, Operation Jubilee took place: Black Hawks from the 160th SOAR flew in teams from the British 22 SAS and DEVGRU into Badakhshan Province, Afghanistan to rescue a British aid worker, a Kenyan NGO worker and 2 Afghans who were taken hostage by bandits in the province. The rescue was a success.

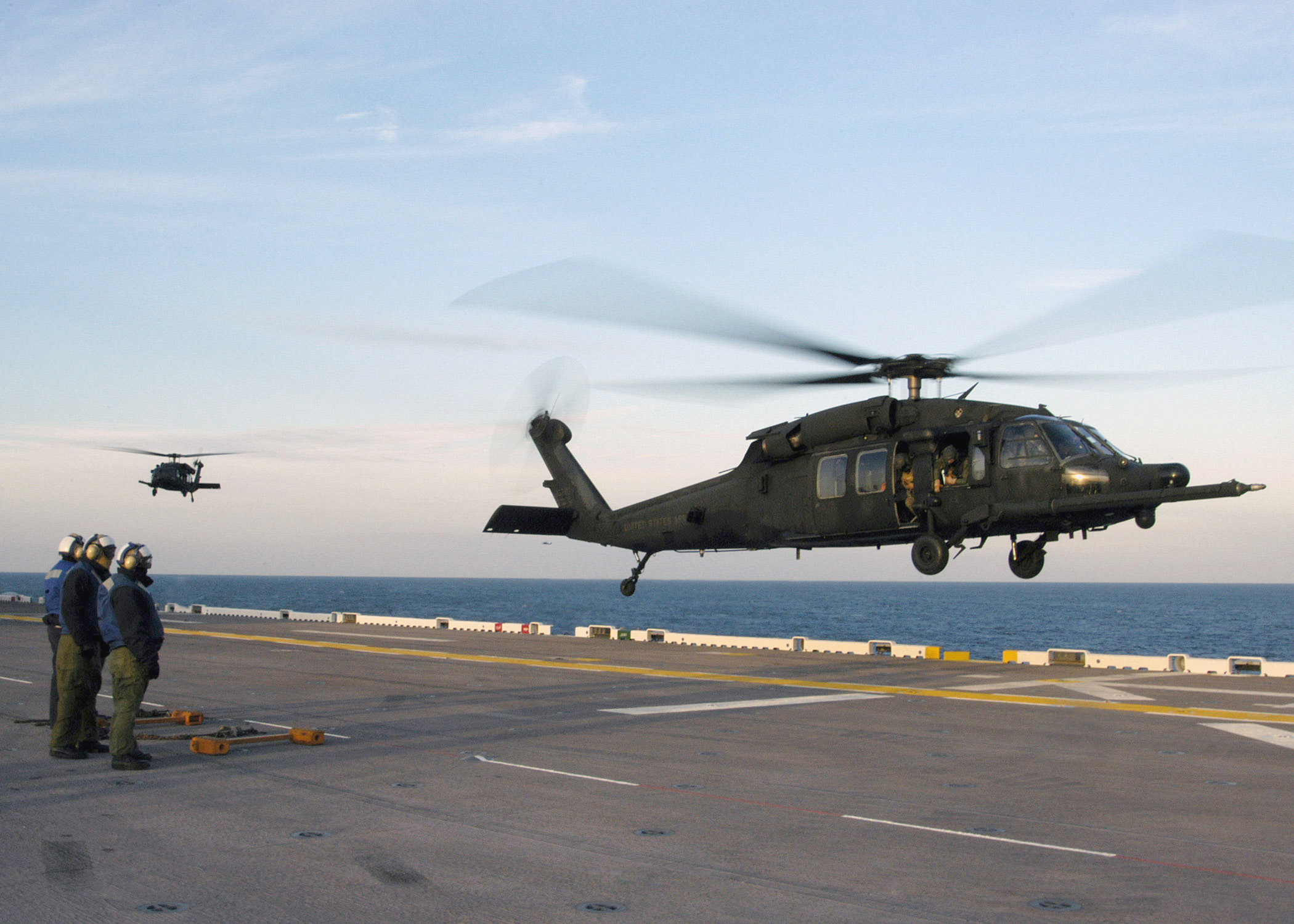
An MH-60L from the regiment lands aboard the USS Bataan (LHD-5).

On 15 January 2014, a MH-60M Black Hawk of the 160th performed a hard landing at Hunter Army Airfield in Georgia. One soldier, CPT Clayton Carpenter of NY, posthumously promoted to MAJ, was killed, with another two injured.

On 4 July 2014, during Operation Inherent Resolve, the Night Stalkers inserted Delta Force operators into Syria to rescue James Foley and other US hostages. One American was wounded, no hostages were found, but a substantial number of terrorists were killed. CENTCOM mistakenly posted a video on the internet of a flight of four MH-60Ms of the 160th SOAR conducting a mid-air refueling over Iraq in October 2014, the video was hastily taken down. On 26 November 2014, MH-60s flown by Nightstalkers took part in the first raid in the 2014 hostage rescue operations in Yemen.

On 22 October 2015, the 160th SOAR provided airlift support to a joint task force composed of Delta Force operators and members of the Kurdish Counter Terrorism Department (CTD) during the 2015 Hawija prison raid, which aimed to rescue hostages held by the Islamic State (ISIS) who were facing imminent execution.

The Night Stalkers continue to be deployed to Afghanistan as part of NATO's Resolute Support Mission after Operation Enduring Freedom-Afghanistan ended in late 2014 and was replaced with Operation Freedom's Sentinel. Throughout the night of 5 December 2015, a group of Rangers engaged in a firefight with enemy troops near the Afghan-Pakistan border. After about 5 a.m. their commander called for an extraction after they learned of a larger enemy group approaching. An arriving helicopter from the 160th SOAR and came under heavy enemy fire. An AH-64 Apache from the 1st Battalion, 101st Aviation Regiment, which was escorting the helicopter, positioned itself directly between the U.S. troops, the extraction helicopter, and the enemy forces to draw fire. As a result, the extraction was successful.

On 29 January 2017, the 160th SOAR took part in the Yakla raid in Yemen, distinguishing itself when its helicopters flew repeatedly into heavy enemy fire to support U.S. Navy SEALs pinned down on the ground. On 25 August 2017, a Black Hawk helicopter flown by the 160th SOAR crashed off the coast of Yemen while conducting hoist training, when it lost power and crashed into the sea. Six servicemen survived, one US service member remained missing. On 27 October 2017, a US helicopter from 4th Battalion 160th SOAR crashed in Logar province, Afghanistan, killing one and injuring six more US service members. The crash was not a result of enemy action.

On 20 August 2018, CW3 Taylor Galvin died from injuries resulting from an MH-60M crash while conducting a partnered counter-terrorism mission in support of the Operation Inherent Resolve.

=== 2021–present ===
On September 18, 2021, a man wielding a katana attacked several SOAR soldiers at Inyokern Airport in California, wounding two and forcing more than twenty of them, including at least one staff sergeant and one captain, to "hunker down" in a hangar.

On November 10, 2023, five SOAR troops died when a UH-60 Black Hawk crashed in the Mediterranean Sea 30 miles off the coast of Cyprus during a training exercise.

On September 17, 2025, an MH-60 crashed near Summit Lake, in Washington, forty miles from Joint Base Lewis–McChord, killing the four soldiers on board.

In October 2025 SOAR elements were deployed to the Caribbean in the wake of the Trump administration's declaration of a "non-international armed conflict" with "unlawful combatants" alleged to be involved in trafficking drugs to the US.

In January 2026, during the 2026 United States strikes in Venezuela, SOAR elements flew over Caracas to capture Venezuelan president Nicolás Maduro and his wife Cilia Flores prior to him being indicted for Narcotics and Terrorism charges.

In April 2026, SOAR elements participated in 2026 United States F-15E rescue operation in Iran during the 2026 Iran war.

== Aircraft ==
Aircraft	Origin	Type	Variant	In service	Notes
Helicopters
Boeing CH-47	United States	transport / CSAR	MH-47G	71	
Sikorsky UH-60	United States	utility	MH-60L/M	72	Some L models were upgraded to Direct Action Penetrator (DAP) variants
MD500 Defender	United States	light attack	AH/MH-6	47	M variants can be equipped with the Fast Rope Insertion Extraction System (FRIES)
Unmanned Aerial Vehicles (UAVs)
General Atomics MQ-1	United States	surveillance	MQ-1C	12	

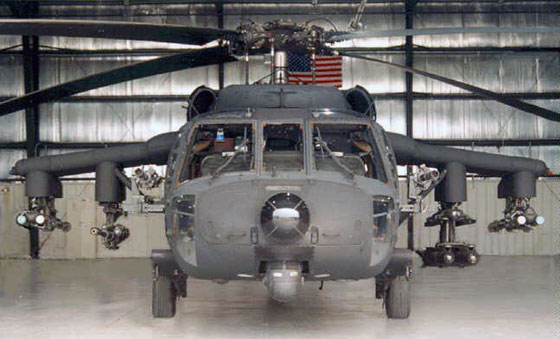
The MH-60L DAP (Direct Action Penetrator) version of the Black Hawk, configured to act as a helicopter gunship, is used exclusively by the 160th SOAR.

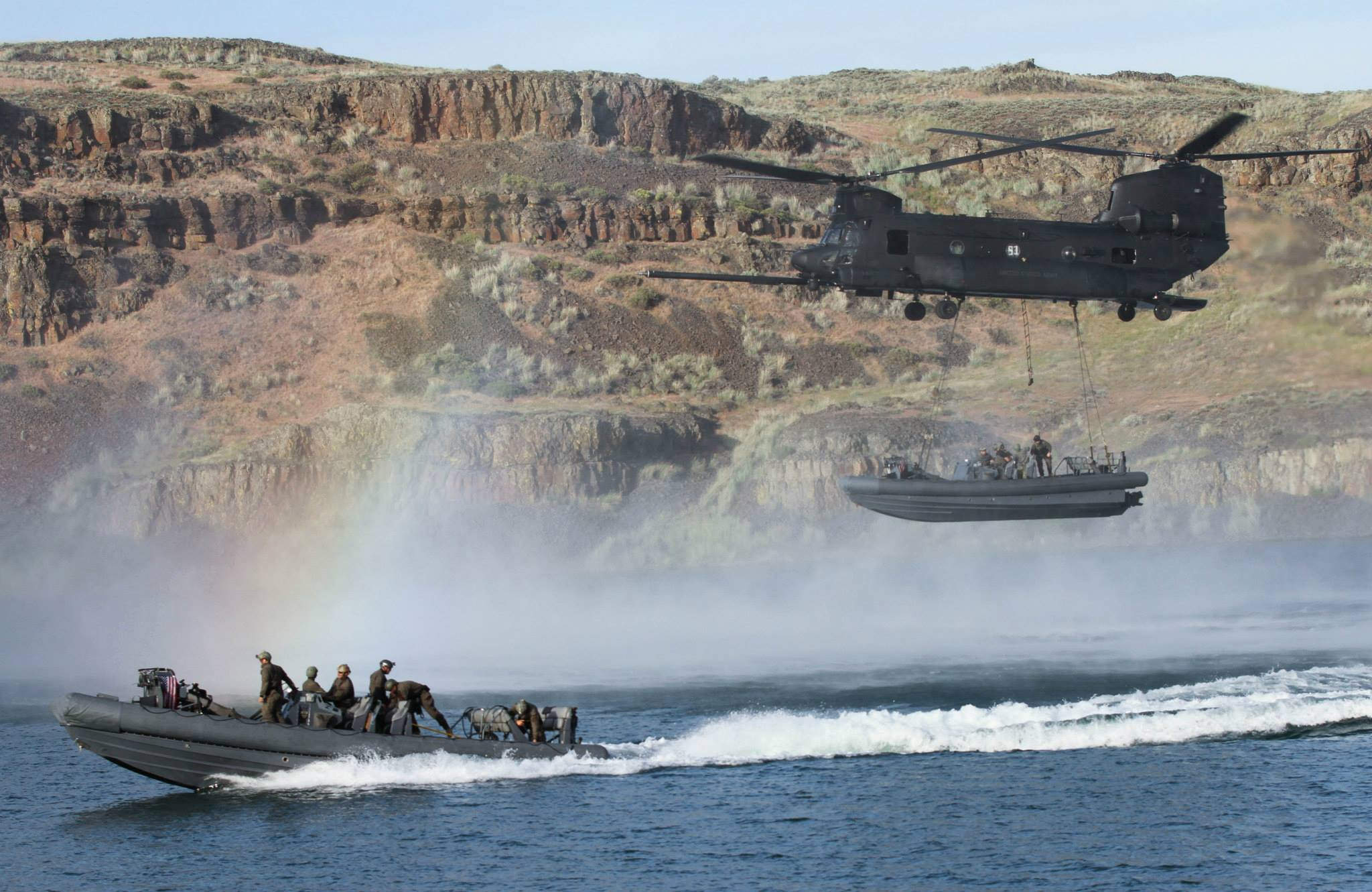
A MH-47G conducts Maritime External Air Transportation System (MEATS) training with the U.S. Navy's Special Warfare Combat Crewmen fast roping onto a Special Operations Craft–Riverine.

=== List of known operations ===
Operation	Country	Year
Operation Urgent Fury	Grenada	1983
Operation Prime Chance	Persian Gulf	1987–1988
Operation Mount Hope III	Chad	1988
Operation Just Cause	Panama	1989
Operation Desert Shield	Iraq	1990
Operation Desert Storm	Iraq	1991
Operation Restore Hope	Somalia	1993
Operation Gothic Serpent	Somalia	1993
Operation Enduring Freedom	Afghanistan / Pakistan	2001–2014
Operation Iraqi Freedom	Iraq	2003–2010
Operation Celestial Balance	Somalia	2009
Operation New Dawn	Iraq	2010–2011
Operation Neptune Spear	Pakistan	2011
Operation Inherent Resolve	Syria / Iraq	2014–2021
Operation Kayla Mueller	Syria	2019
Operation Absolute Resolve	Venezuela	2026
2026 Iran War	Iran	2026-present

== Organization ==
160th Special Operations Aviation Regiment (Airborne) [160th SOAR(A)]

Beret flash	Unit	Location
	160th SOAR(A): Regimental Headquarters and Headquarters Company; USASOAC Special Operations Training Battalion [co-led by the 160th SOAR(A)]	Fort Campbell, Kentucky
	1st Battalion, 160th SOAR(A): Headquarters and Headquarters Company; Light Assault Helicopters Company (MH-6M); Light Attack Helicopters Company (AH-6M); Medium Attack Helicopters Company (MH-60M DAP); Medium Assault Helicopters Company (MH-60M); Aviation Maintenance Company	Fort Campbell, Kentucky
	2nd Battalion, 160th SOAR(A): Headquarters and Headquarters Company; Heavy Assault Helicopters Company (MH-47G); Heavy Assault Helicopters Company (MH-47G); Medium Assault Helicopters Company (MH-60M); Extended-Range Multi-Purpose Company (MQ-1C); Aviation Maintenance Company	Fort Campbell, Kentucky
	3rd Battalion, 160th SOAR(A): Headquarters and Headquarters Company; Medium Assault Helicopters Company (MH-60M); Heavy Assault Helicopters Company (MH-47G); Heavy Assault Helicopters Company (MH-47G); Aviation Maintenance Company	Hunter Army Airfield, Georgia
	4th Battalion, 160th SOAR(A): Headquarters and Headquarters Company; Medium Assault Helicopters Company (MH-60M); Heavy Assault Helicopters Company (MH-47G); Heavy Assault Helicopters Company (MH-47G); Aviation Maintenance Company	Joint Base Lewis-McChord, Washington

== See also ==
- Black helicopter
- Fort Campbell, Kentucky
- Hunter Army Airfield, Georgia
- Joint Base Lewis–McChord, Washington

=== Comparable U.S. units ===
- 7th Special Operations Squadron (352d Special Operations Wing, Air Force Special Operations Command)
- 8th Special Operations Squadron (1st Special Operations Wing, Air Force Special Operations Command)
- 20th Special Operations Squadron (27th Special Operations Wing, Air Force Special Operations Command)
- Helicopter Sea Combat Squadron 85 (HSC-85) (US Navy Reserve, Naval Special Warfare Command)

=== Comparable international units ===
- (Australia) 6th Aviation Regiment
- (Canada) 427 Special Operations Aviation Squadron
- (France) 4th Special Forces Helicopter Regiment
- (Italy) 3rd Special Operations Helicopter Regiment
- (Japan) 1st Helicopter Brigade
- (Poland) Special Operations Aviation Unit
- (United Kingdom) Joint Special Forces Aviation Wing
