= Summit Lake (Washington) =

Lake in Thurston County, Washington state

- Prays Lakes, Crooked Lake
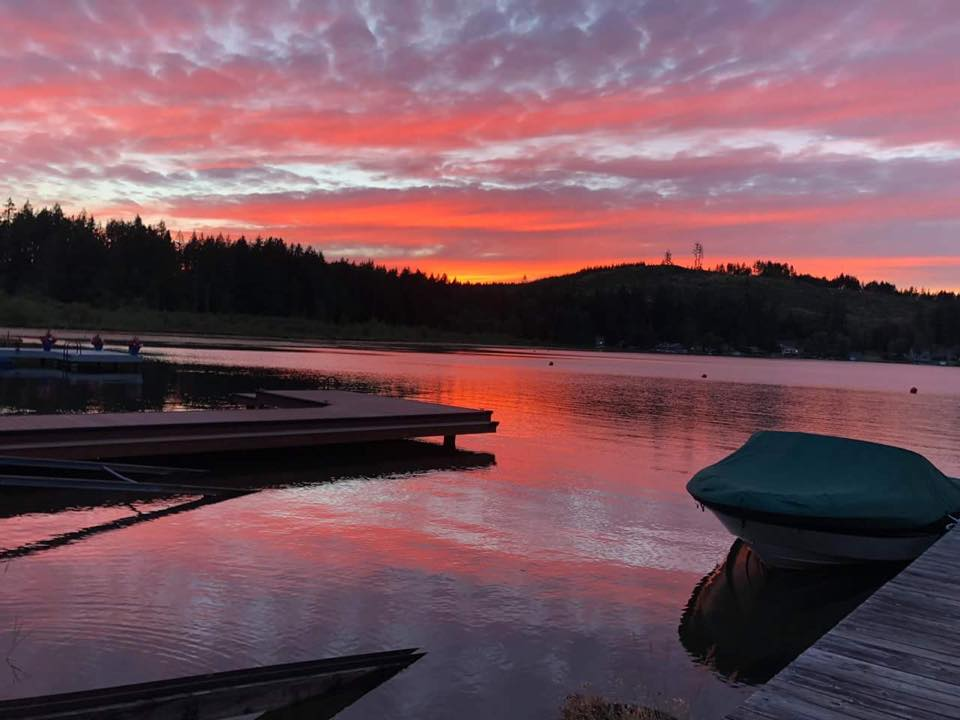
- Sunset at Summit Lake

- Location of Summit Lake in Washington state
- Location: Thurston County, Washington
- Coordinates: 47°03′18″N 123°05′53″W
- Type: Lake
- Surface area: 511.2 acres (206.9 ha)
- Surface elevation: 459 ft (140 m)
- Website: Official website
- References: Geographic Names Information System: 1513483

Summit Lake is a freshwater lake located in the northwest corner of Thurston County in Southwest Washington. The lake is about 7.6 mi (12.2 km) east of McCleary, Washington, 9.7 mi (15.6 km) west from the state capital of Olympia, and 9.8 mi (15.8 km) west-northwest of Tumwater, Washington.

== History ==
Early variant names were "Prays Lake" and "Crooked Lake"; the present name was adopted c. 1900.

A U.S. Army helicopter, a MH-60 Black Hawk, crashed near Summit Lake in September 2025. Four Army soldiers, assigned to the 4th Battalion, 160th SOAR(A), died in the crash which set off a small fire.

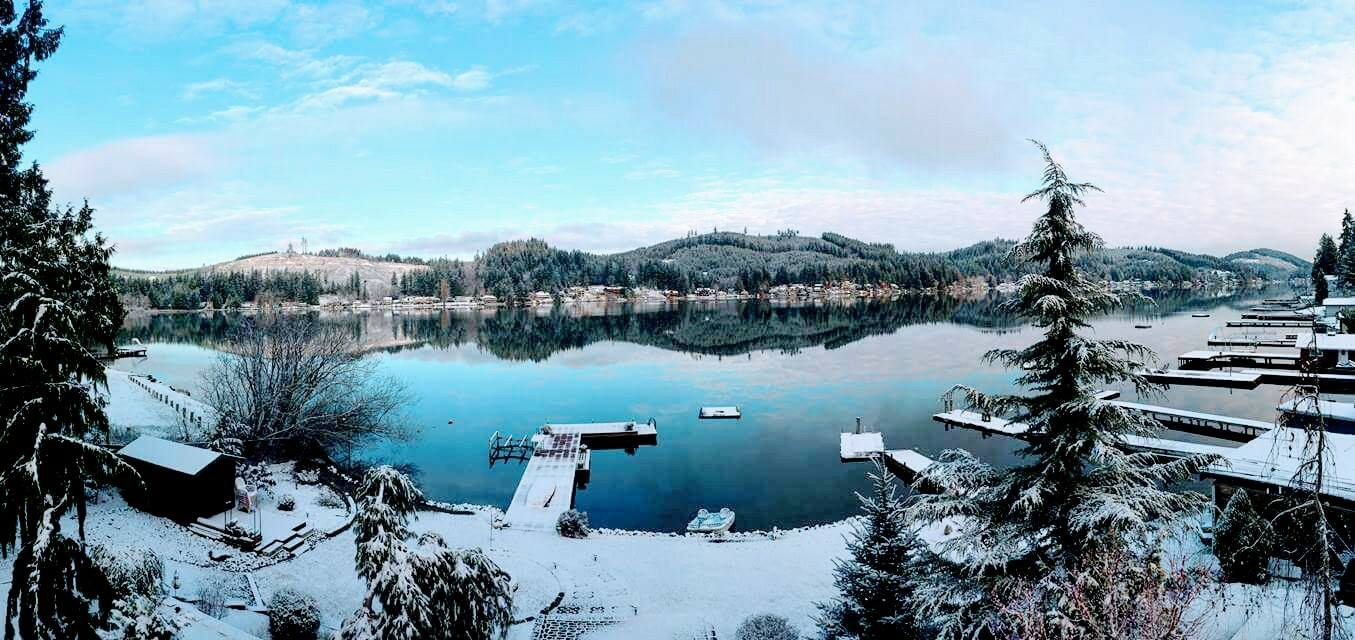
Summit Lake in winter after snowy weather

== Environment and ecology ==
Summit Lake is a clean, fresh water lake with a wide variety of fish which include rainbow trout, kokanee, largemouth bass, smallmouth bass, yellow perch, and coastal cutthroat.

== Recreation ==
The lake is accessed by a Washington State Department of Fish and Wildlife-owned boat launch located at the southwestern side of the inland body of water. The site is a popular lake to fish at in Thurston County and the South Puget Sound.

== See also ==
- List of geographic features in Thurston County, Washington
