= Bartos/Nobel BN-1 Phantom =

BN-1 Phantom
- Bartos/Nobel BN-1 Phantom

General information
- Type: Glider
- National origin: United States
- Designer: Gene Bartos
- Status: Production complete
- Number built: One

History
- Introduction date: late 1960s
- Developed from: Laister-Kauffman TG-4

The Bartos/Nobel BN-1 Phantom is an American, two-seat, mid-wing glider designed by Gene Bartos in the late 1960s.

== Design and development ==
Bartos developed the BN-1 using the fuselage from a Laister-Kauffman TG-4 and designing new wings. The fuselage was highly modified to include an all-flying T-tail and new cockpit canopy. The wings have a 9 ft (2.7 m) greater span than the TG-4 using a NACA 44-series airfoil. The new wing uses top-surface spoilers in place of flaps. The new wing results in a glide ratio improved from 22:1 to 25:1.

The fuselage is made from steel tube, while the wings are of wooden construction, all finished with doped aircraft fabric covering. The landing gear is a fixed monowheel, supplemented by a nose skid.

== Operational history ==
In 1983 it was reported that the sole example had been based at El Mirage, California since it was new and was regularly flown. By April 2011 the aircraft had been de-registered by the Federal Aviation Administration.

== Specifications (BN-1) ==
Data from Soaring

General characteristics

- Crew: one
- Capacity: one passenger
- Wingspan: 59 ft 0 in (17.98 m)
- Wing area: 200 sq ft (19 m^{2})
- Aspect ratio: 15:1
- Airfoil: NACA 4415 reflexed
- Empty weight: 680 lb (308 kg)
- Gross weight: 1,030 lb (467 kg)

Performance

- Maximum glide ratio: 25:1
- Wing loading: 5.0 lb/sq ft (24 kg/m^{2})

== See also ==
- List of gliders
