= Operation Mount Hope III =

1988 U.S. military operation that captured a Hind helicopter

Operation Mount Hope III was a top secret American military operation to capture a Soviet-made Mil Mi-24 "Hind-D" attack helicopter, an export model of the Soviet Mi-24. The aircraft had been abandoned in the conflict between Libya and Chad.

== Background ==
Location map

The eight-month Toyota War that ended in September 1987 was the last of a series of clashes between Chad and Libya over the control of the Aouzou Strip, a region of northern Chad that lies along the border with Libya. The war resulted in a defeat of the Libyans by the outnumbered Chadians.

Chad had been supported by weapon shipments from the United States and by French aircraft and around 2400 French troops (see Operation Épervier). Also, the Chadians had made good use of highly-mobile forces transported on armed pickup trucks known as technicals. The tactical importance of these vehicles led to the war being named after the company that made many of them.

The defeated Libyan forces suffered thousands of casualties. Around one and a half billion dollars' worth of military equipment was destroyed or abandoned as they retreated from northern Chad. This included around 20 aircraft left behind at the former Libyan air base at Ouadi Doum, which was captured by Chadian forces in March 1987.

The United States moved quickly to recover some of this equipment. In May 1987, seven Czech Aero L-39 Albatros aircraft were dismantled and removed one-by-one in a US Air Force C-130 Hercules transport. The Americans and French then agreed to jointly recover and share examples of Soviet-made equipment that had been left behind. Each country got a number of 9K35 Strela-10 and 2K12 Kub surface-to-air missile systems; the Americans also took a P-19 radar as the French already had a similar P-15 radar.

== Recovery operation ==
=== Preparations ===
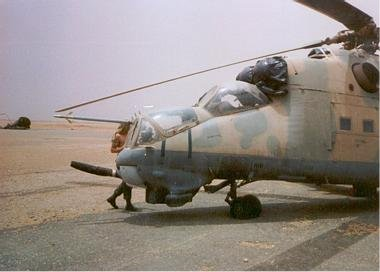
An abandoned Mi-24 Hind at Ouadi Doum

The United States had long been keen to acquire a Hind. A previous effort to recover one from Chad had delivered an aircraft that was not airworthy as it had been necessary to cut it up for transport by truck.

After lengthy, three-way negotiations between the French, American and the Chadian governments, permission was given to recover two Libyan Mi-24 Hinds from Chad. In January 1988, the French acquired a badly damaged aircraft that had been shot down around a year earlier during the Battle of Fada. Meanwhile the United States was allowed to recover an abandoned Mi-24 Hind from Ouadi Doum, with the Americans handing over two million dollars and a batch of FIM-92 Stinger missiles in exchange for the permission. The decision was made to transport the helicopter by air and the task was assigned to the US Army's 160th Special Operations Aviation Regiment.

In April 1988, the unit began training for the mission with night-time flights of MH-47 Chinook helicopters around White Sands, New Mexico. One of the Chinooks carried an external, slung-load of six, 500-US-gallon (1,900 L) water containers to simulate the weight of a Hind. During these exercises, the Chinooks made several landings en-route to refuel from a C-130 Hercules. To simulate their deployment to Chad, the Chinooks had first been disassembled and flown to New Mexico in a C-5 Galaxy transport aircraft.

=== Operation ===
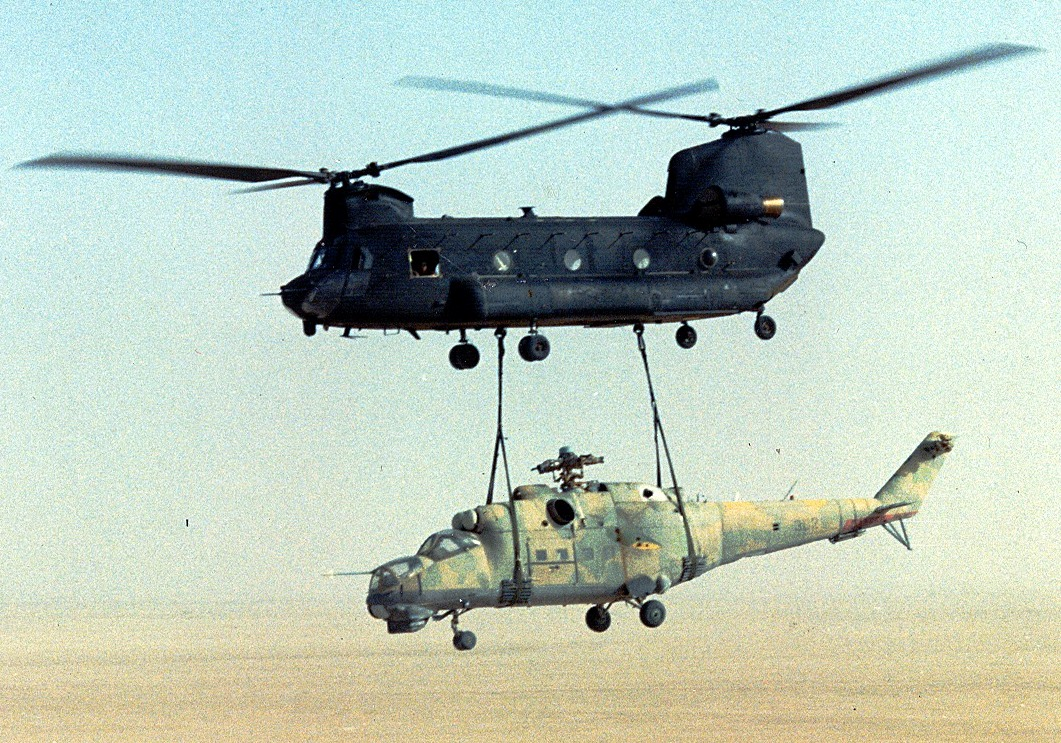
A US Army MH-47 Chinook carrying the Libyan Hind as a slung load, 11 June 1988

On 21 May, the order was given to proceed. An advance party arrived on 31 May at N'Djamena, the capital city of Chad. In the second week of June a single C-5 Galaxy flew directly from Fort Campbell, Kentucky, to N'Djamena International Airport, carrying both the MH-47's that were to be used, and over sixty personnel. Only one helicopter would be needed; the second was to be a backup in case of technical problems.

The transport aircraft landed at dusk and the partially disassembled helicopters were immediately unloaded; ground crew worked through the night reassembling them. The helicopters also had unnecessary items removed to save weight, and were fitted with additional tanks in the cargo area that held an extra 600 US gallons (2,300 L) of fuel.

At midnight on 11 June, the two Chinooks left N'Djamena for the 550-mile (890 km) trip to the Ouadi Doum airfield. Secrecy and speed were important to the operation as some Libyan forces remained in the area. It was also feared that the Libyans might bomb their abandoned helicopters if they became aware of an attempt to recover one. The Libyans carried out many air-attacks on Ouadi Doum in the days following its fall to try to destroy the military equipment they had abandoned there. These had been demanded by the Soviet Union, to prevent clandestine recovery efforts of the kind that later took place.

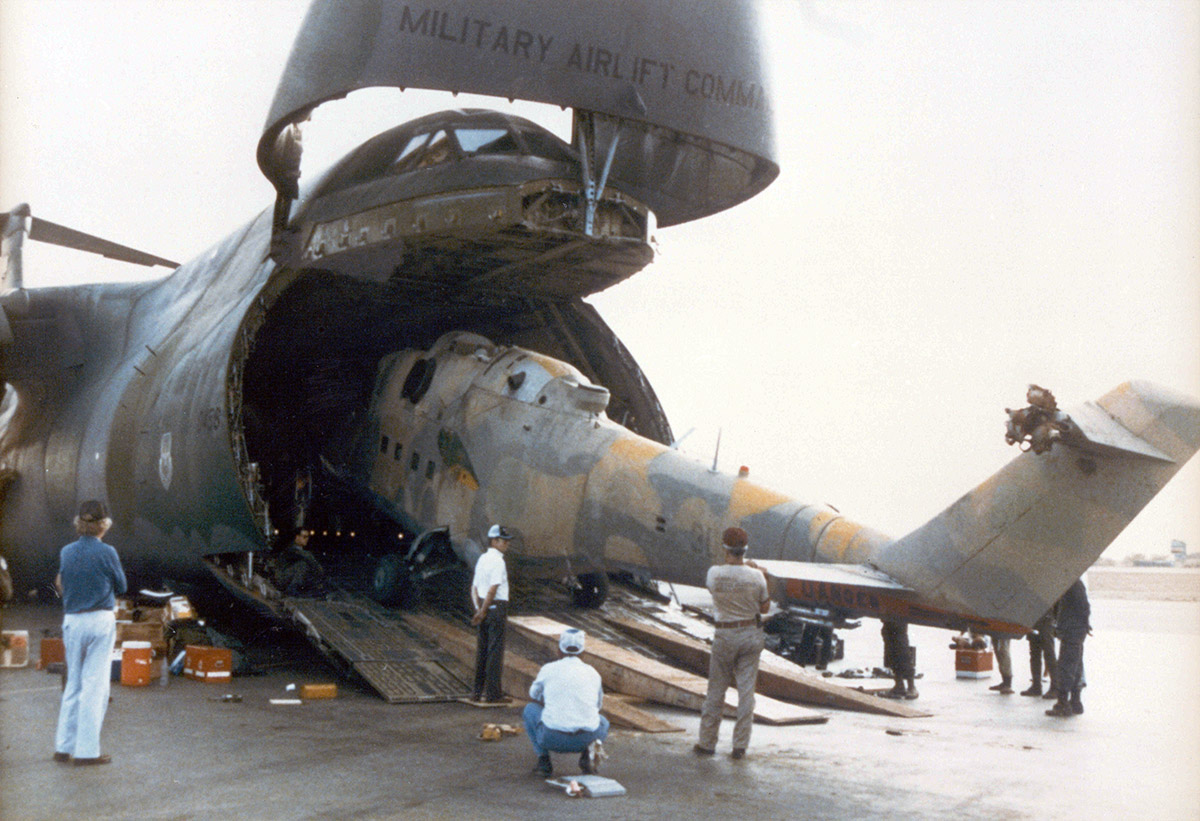
The Hind being loaded into a C-5 at N'Djamena

At Ouadi Doum, an advance team had secured the airfield and prepared the Hind for transport. The helicopter had been almost airworthy, except a bullet had struck one of its engines and flying it was considered too risky. Both Chinooks' additional fuel tanks were removed as the helicopters could not lift both the tanks and the Hind slung underneath. These tanks, together with the Hind's rotor blades, were flown out on a C-130 Hercules.

The Chinooks took off for the return trip to N'Djamena, stopping to refuel at Faya-Largeau, where a US Air Force C-130 had already landed to establish a temporary refuelling station. A second refuelling stop was required at Moussoro, at an airfield garrisoned by a unit of the French Foreign Legion. The French further assisted the operation by flying a number of Mirage F1s to provide air-cover.

The Chinooks landed at N'Djamena just as the area was engulfed by a sand storm. After this passed, the Hind was loaded into a C-5 for transport to the United States. Meanwhile the two MH-47s were disassembled to fly back in a second C-5, returning to Fort Campbell via Ascension Island and Antigua.

== Outcome ==
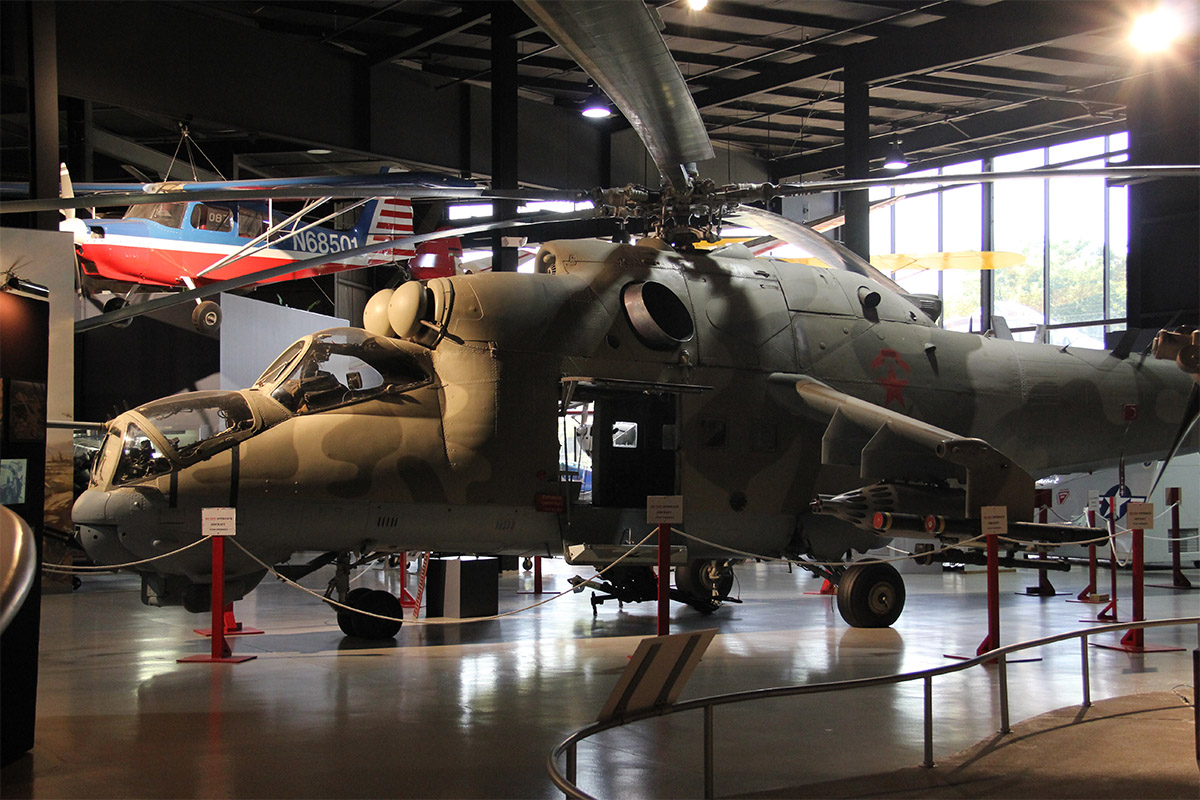
The Mi-24 on display at the Southern Museum of Flight, 2016

The Hind was successfully removed to the United States, arriving at Fort Rucker on 16 June 1988. It was returned to flying status for evaluation. When this was completed it was transferred to the Threat Systems Management Office and used in demonstrations of its capabilities to other units. It was also used in training exercises, acting as an opposing force against both troops on the ground and US helicopters.

In 2012, the aircraft was given to the Southern Museum of Flight at Birmingham, Alabama, saving it from plans to scrap it. It remains there on display to the present day.

In addition to the Libyan Hinds removed by the Americans and the French, a further one was acquired by the British.
