= Silent Wings Museum =

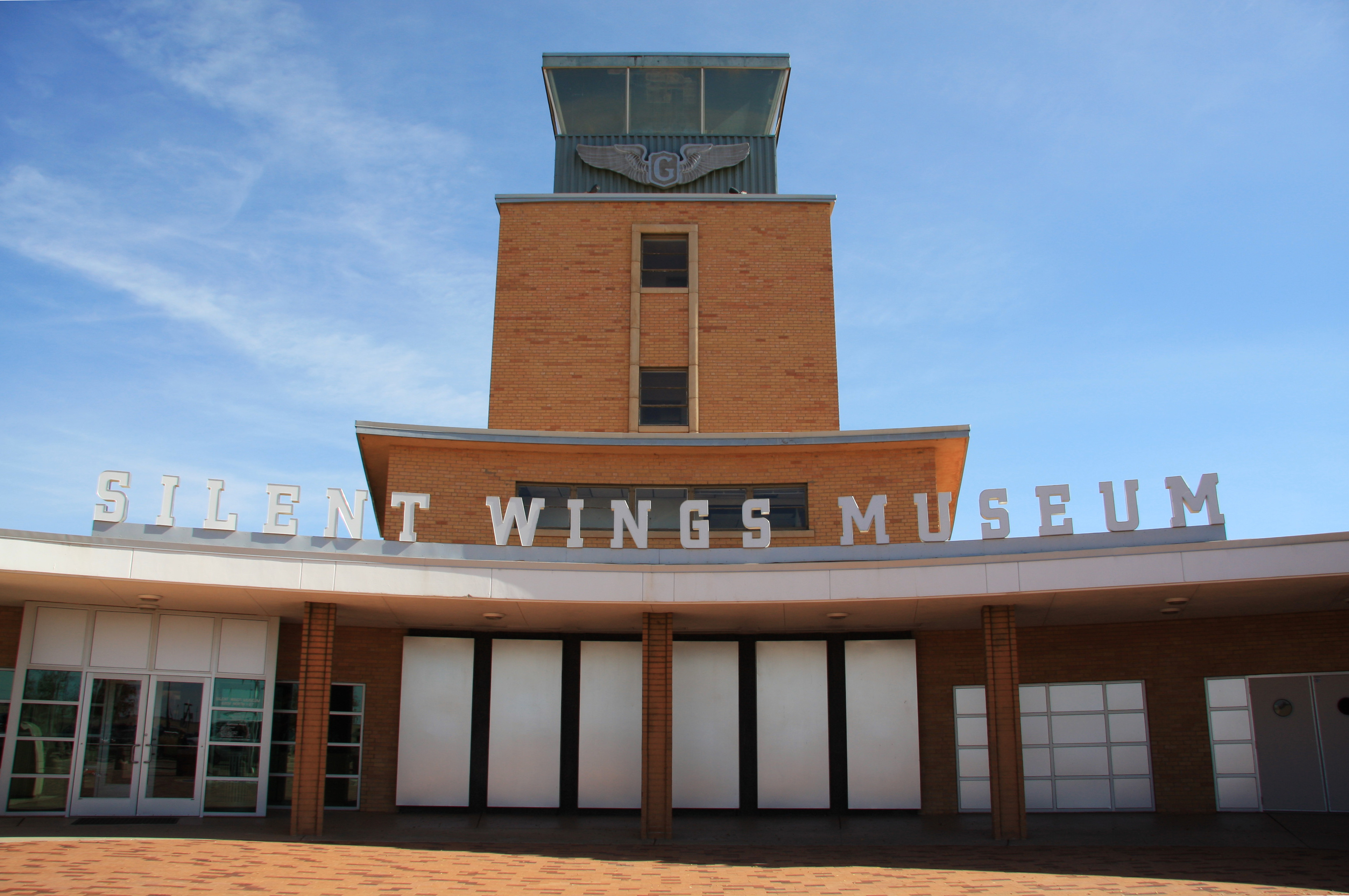
- Front entrance

- Location in West Texas Silent Wings (the United States)
- Established: 20 October 2001
- Location: Lubbock County, Texas
- Coordinates: 33.657778°N 101.831667°W
- Type: Historical museum
- Owners: National World War II Glider Pilots Association, City of Lubbock
- Website: Silent Wings Museum - official site

Silent Wings Museum, "The Legacy of The World War II Glider Pilots," is a museum in Lubbock, Texas. The museum is housed in the former tower and terminal building of Lubbock's airport during the 1950s, and 1960s.

== History ==
The museum is located on the site of World War II South Plains Army Air Field, where glider pilots were trained between 1942 and 1945, and after which time they were required also to command skills in powered flight. The giant "silent wing" gliders flew soldiers and supplies largely undetected behind enemy lines because they had no engine noise. The Lubbock site was initially chosen for the Army's glider school because of its dry climate, warm weather, mostly clear skies, and good will in the local community. The arid climate surroundings of the South Plains generally tend to create upward air currents and relatively few low-cloud formations, both of which are conditions deemed desirable in civilian gliding. The glider training area is now within the scope of the museum and of the nearby Lubbock Preston Smith International Airport.

In 1971, former pilots of the U.S. Army Air Force banded together to form the National World War II Glider Pilots Association, Inc. Their mission was to establish a forum for glider pilots to interact socially and to provide the framework for the preservation of the history of the U.S. glider program.

One of its first goals was to locate and restore a WACO CG-4A (See CG-4 Hadrian) glider for public display and viewing. Several former glider pilots living in the Dallas area learned of just such a glider sitting on top of a tire store in Fresno, California. After World War II, the giant, bulky aircraft had been purchased as military surplus, placed on top of the building, and subsequently used as advertising. In 1979, the glider was purchased, restored, and completed in time for the glider pilots' annual reunion in Dallas. After that reunion, plans were made and steps were taken to build a museum to house the CG-4A.

The first Silent Wings Museum opened to the public on November 10, 1984, in Terrell, east of Dallas. By 1997, the need for a more permanent museum home was realized. Responding to the need for a permanent glider home, the city of Lubbock, where a majority of the pilots had originally trained, offered to provide a new site for the museum. The pilots agreed to the new location, and the Terrell site closed in January 2001. The following October, the former South Plains Army Air Field site opened the new Silent Wings Museum with the restored CG-4A glider as the centerpiece of the exhibits.

== Exhibits ==
The museum features in its theater a 15-minute program titled Silent Wings: The Story of the World War II Glider Program. Visitors then move on to the Timeline, Hangar and Combat Galleries. Photographs and artifacts include a fully restored WACO CG-4A glider, TG-4 trainer, airborne equipment, a small barracks rendition from the Lubbock Army Air Field, and a living exhibit: the British Horsa Glider restoration project.

== Education and outreach ==
Silent Wings offers a variety of outreach programs and provides speakers who can tailor a program to fit a group's meeting. The Adams Research Library is located within the Silent Wings Museum. It is home to an extensive archive and book collection about the World War II military glider program. Research appointments can be scheduled.

== Gallery ==
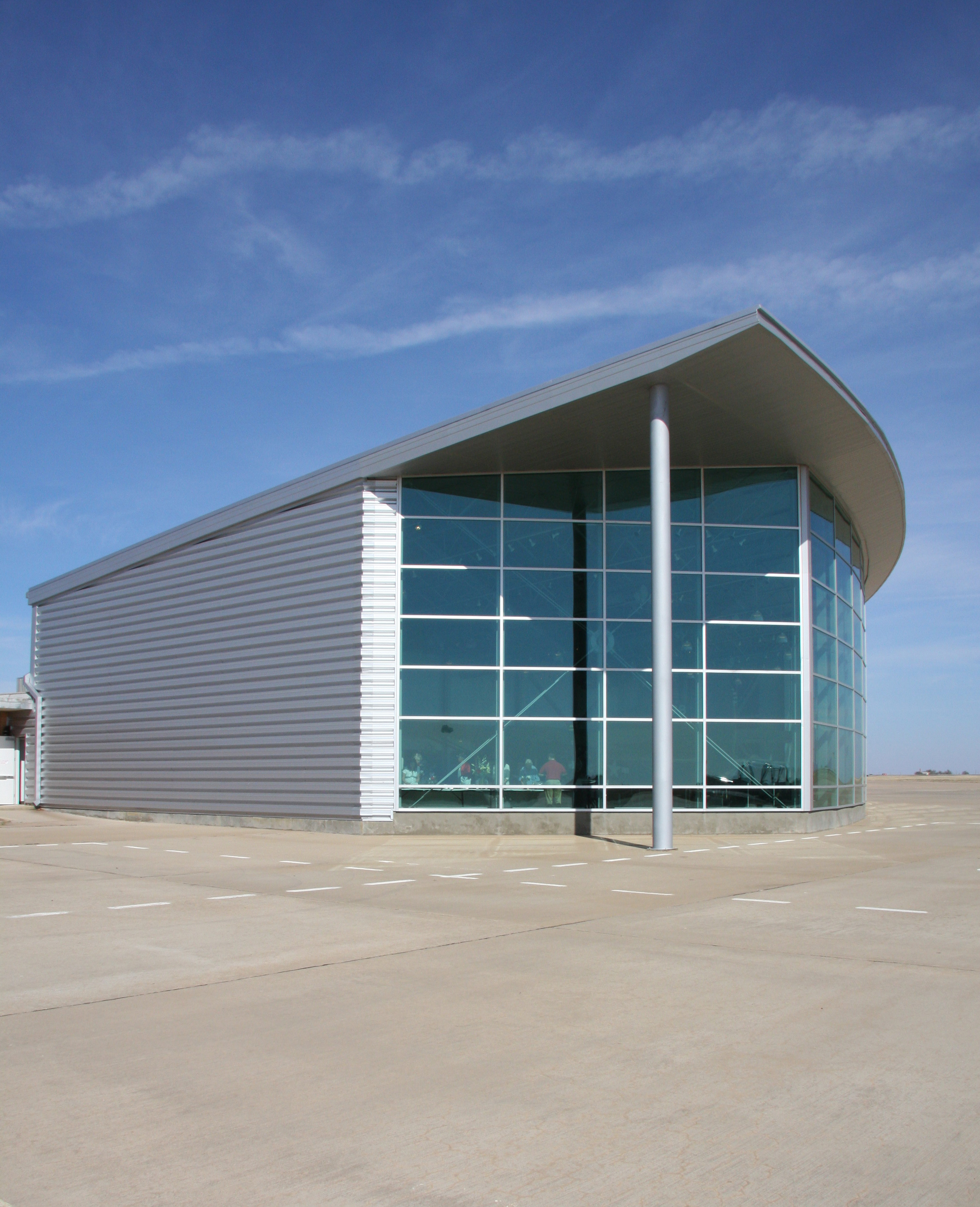
View from the ramp

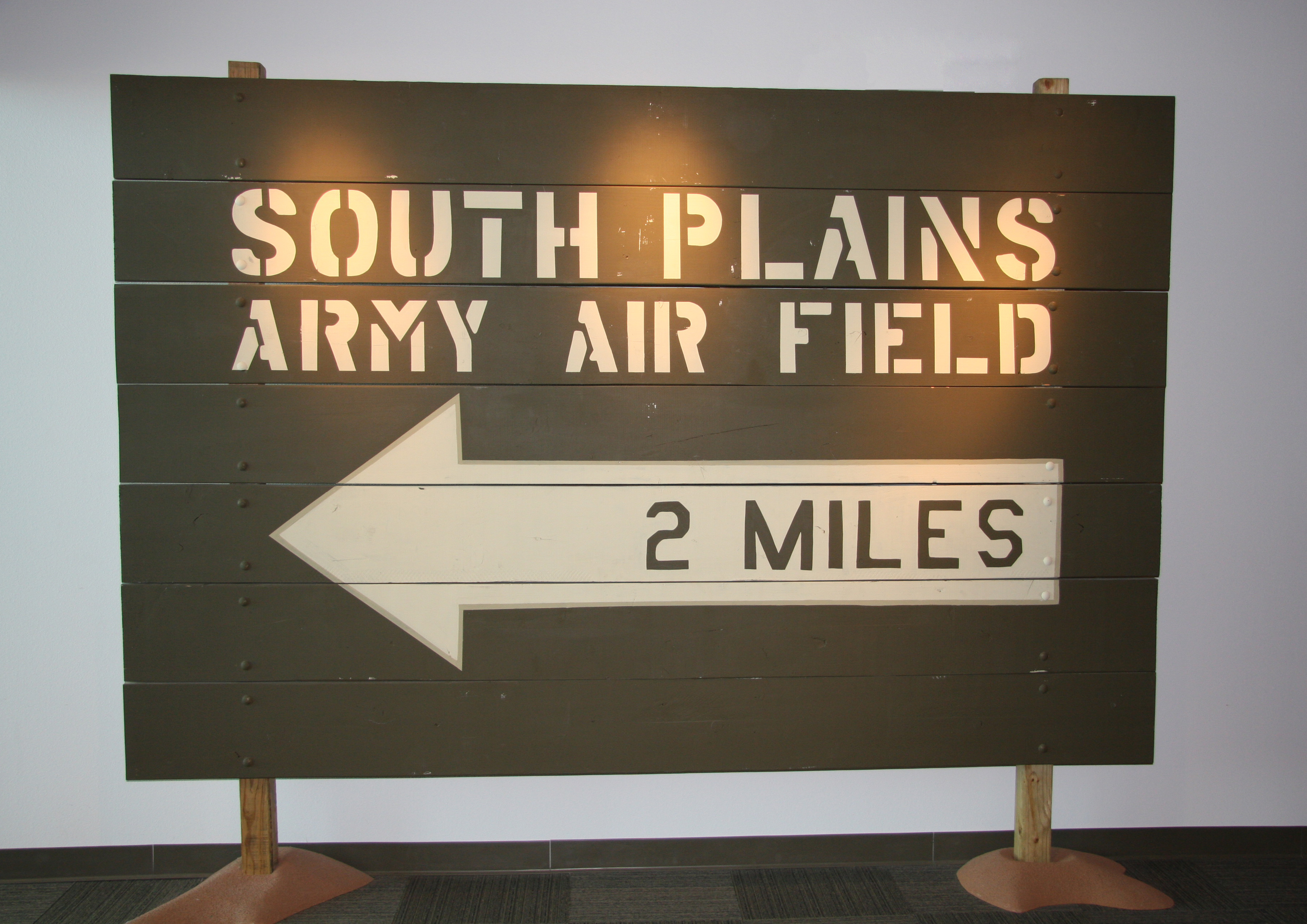
South Plains Army Air Field sign

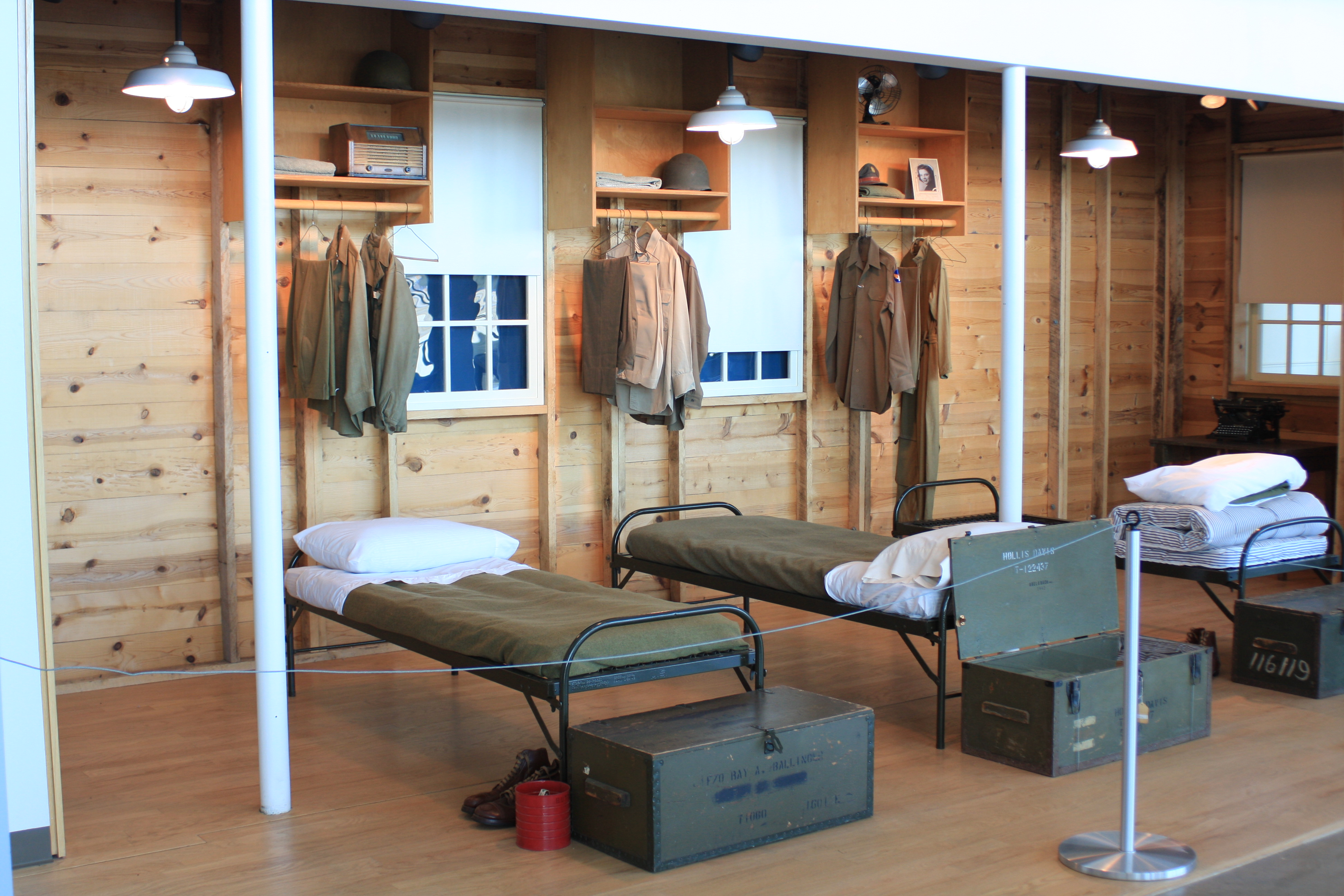
Barracks at the former South Plains Army Air Field, Lubbock

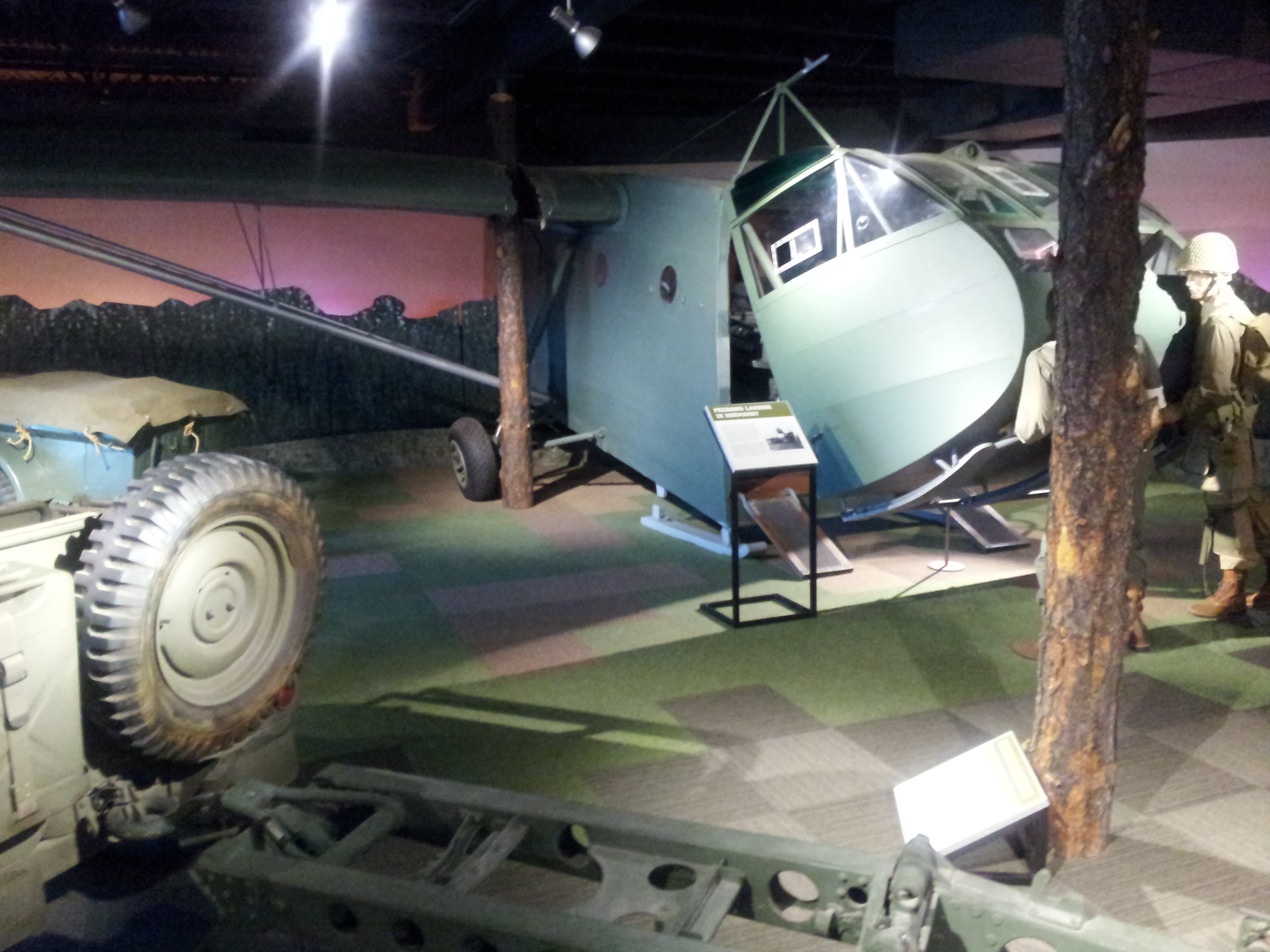
CG-4A in action display

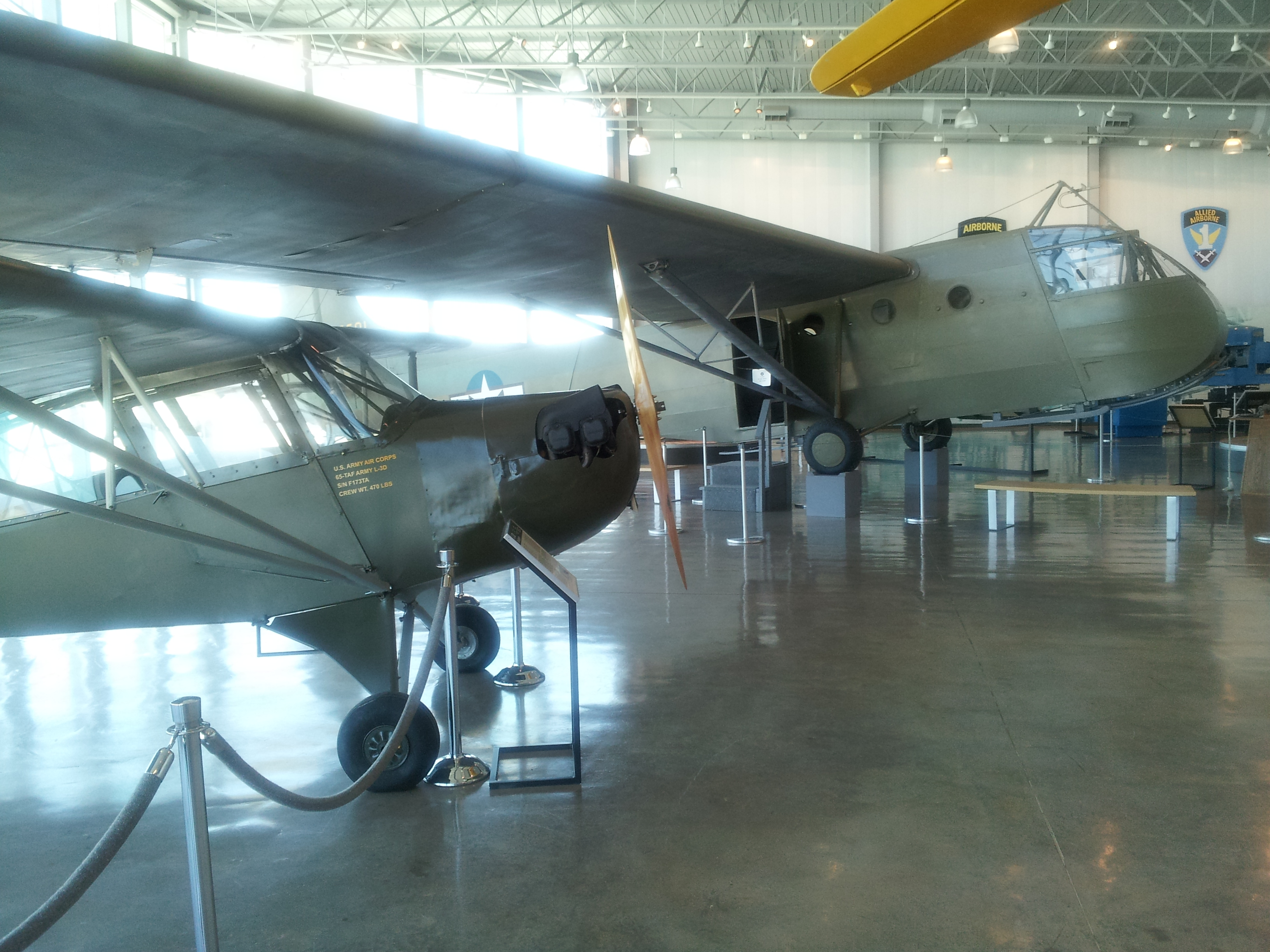
CG-4A inside the museum

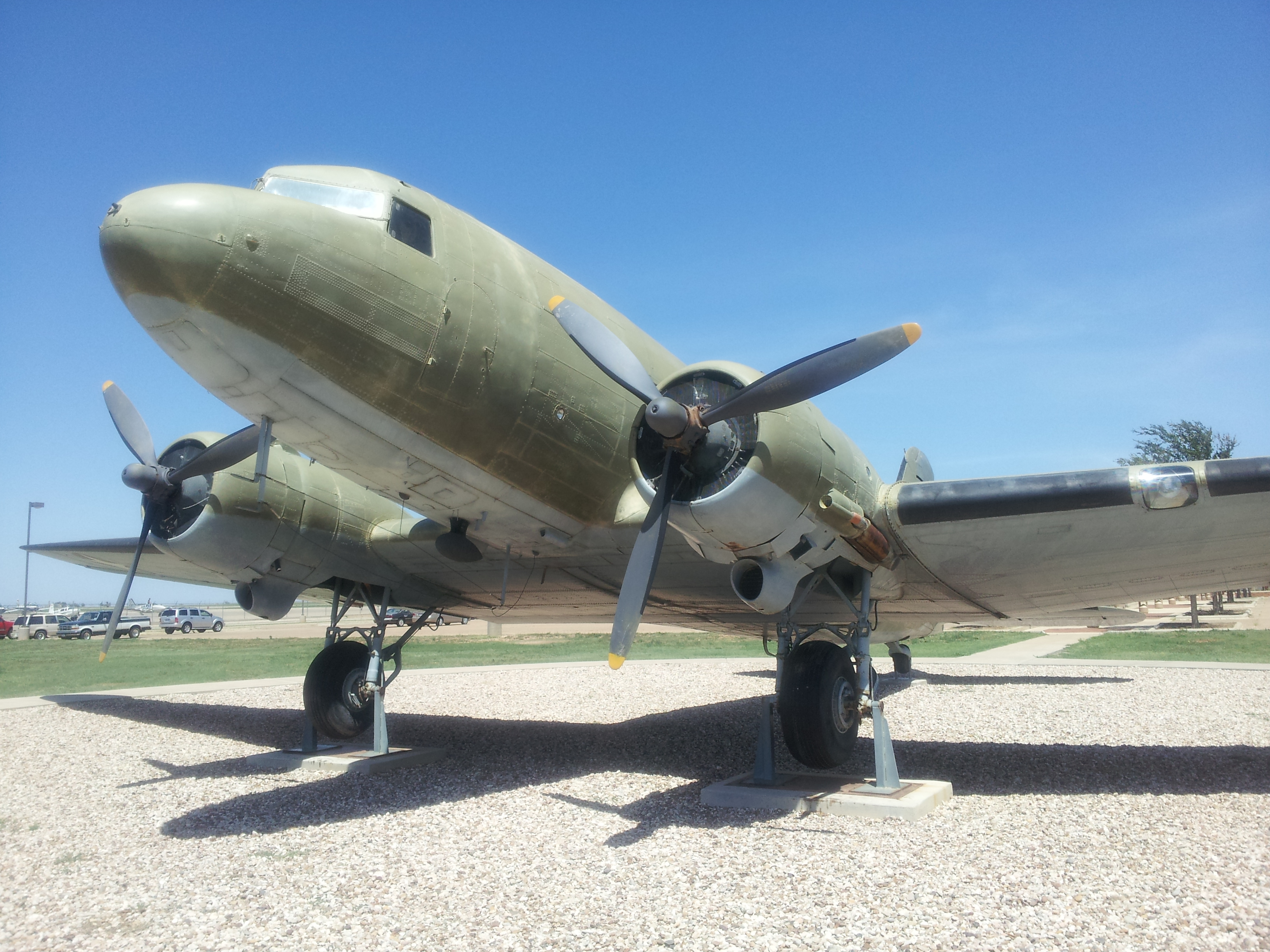
Douglas C-47 Skytrain in front of the museum

== See also ==
- American Wind Power Center
- Lubbock Lake Landmark
- Museum of Texas Tech University
- National Ranching Heritage Center
- Glider snatch pick-up
