= Laister-Kauffman TG-4 =

TG-4, LK-10
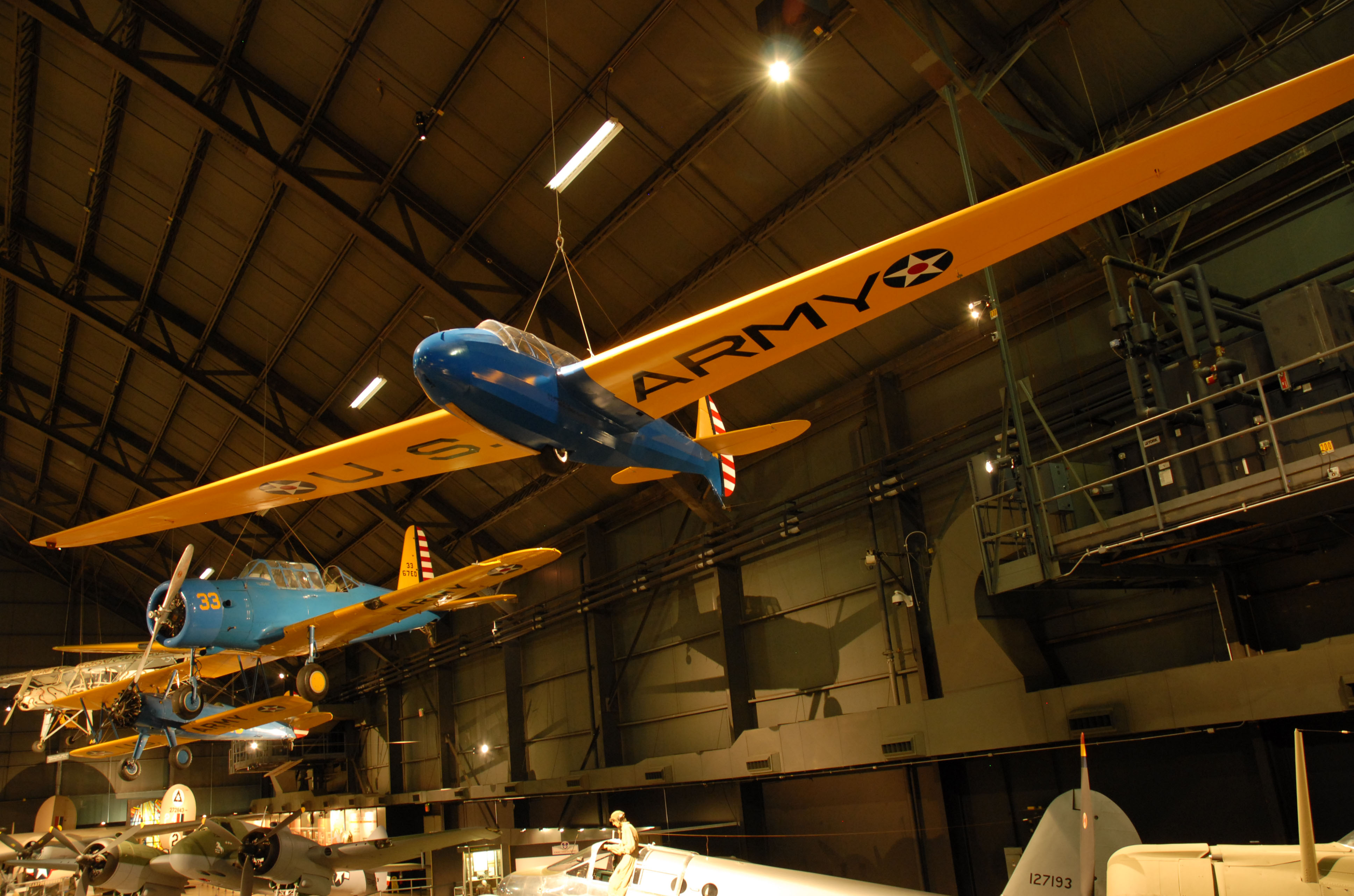
- TG-4A in the National Museum of the United States Air Force

General information
- Type: Sailplane
- National origin: United States
- Manufacturer: Laister-Kauffmann
- Designer: Jack Laister
- Number built: 153

History
- Developed from: Yankee Doodle
- Variant: Bartos/Nobel BN-1 Phantom

The Laister-Kauffmann TG-4 (designated LK-10 Yankee Doodle 2 by its designer) is a sailplane produced in the United States during the Second World War for training cargo glider pilots. It was a conventional sailplane design with a fuselage of steel tube construction and wooden wings and tail, covered all over with fabric. The pilot and instructor sat in tandem under a long canopy.

== Design and development ==
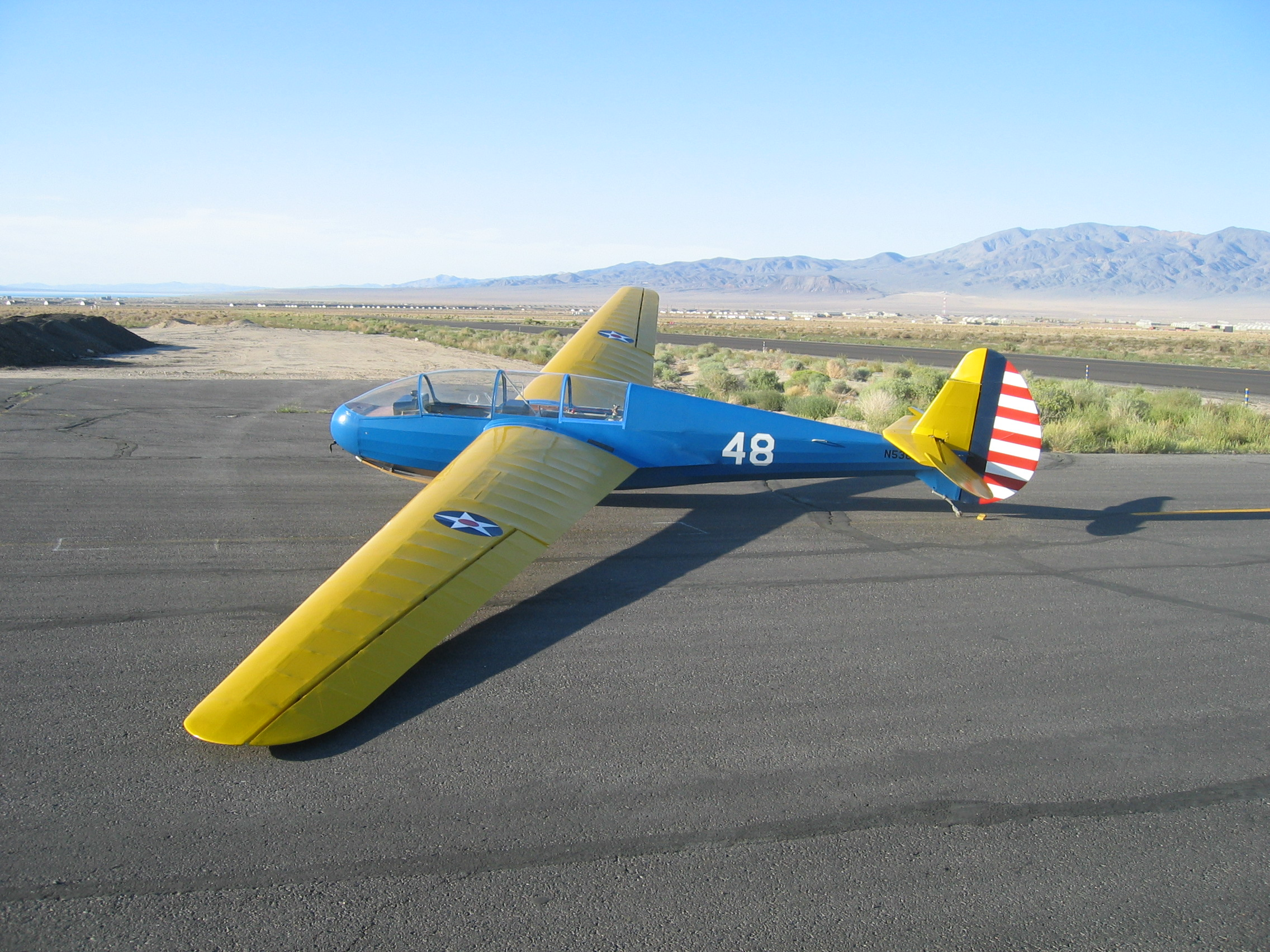
LK-10A/TG-4A N53619 based in Tehachapi, California, USA

Jack Laister designed the aircraft in response to the formation of the United States Army Air Corps' American Glider Program in 1941, basing it on his Yankee Doodle design of 1938 for Lawrence Tech. Aside from the addition of a second seat, the Yankee Doodle 2 differed from its predecessor by having wings of constant dihedral instead of gull wings. The USAAC expressed interest, but only if Laister could arrange for the manufacture of the type. When Laister found a sponsor in businessman John Kauffmann, they established the Laister-Kauffmann Corporation in St Louis, Missouri and the USAAC ordered three prototypes as the XTG-4.

When evaluation of the type proved positive, the Army placed an order for 75 aircraft, followed by an order for another 75. These were operated as the TG-4A. All had been withdrawn from service prior to the end of the war when it was discovered that the flight characteristics of the aircraft were so different to those of a cargo glider, that the experience gained on the TG-4 was not particularly relevant. After the war many were sold as surplus and helped build civilian gliding in the USA.

== Variants ==
- XTG-4 – prototypes (three built)
- TG-4A – production model (150 built)
- TG-4B – civilian aircraft impressed into service (one impressed)

== Operators ==
LK-10 Serial #48 registered as N53619 owned and flown by Doug Fronius of Poway, California, USA as of 2023. Based at Mountain Valley Airport in Tehachapi, California.

LK-10 Serial #106 under prefix PT-PAZ operated by Aeroclube de Bauru in Brazil as of April 2013

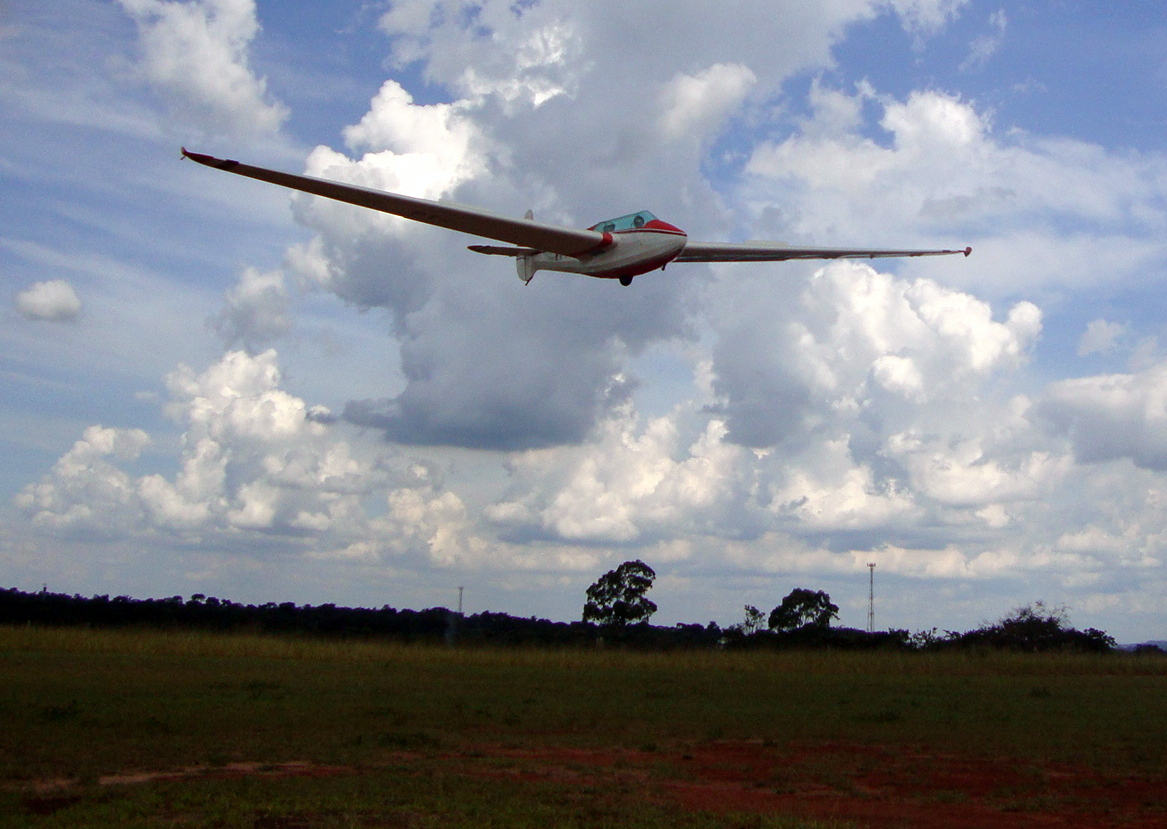
Laister-Kauffman TG-4 PT-PAZ in Bauru, Brazil

This glider crashed on March 10, 2020.

LK-10 Serial # unk operating at Rockton, Ontario (CF-ZAJ) as of Apr, 2022

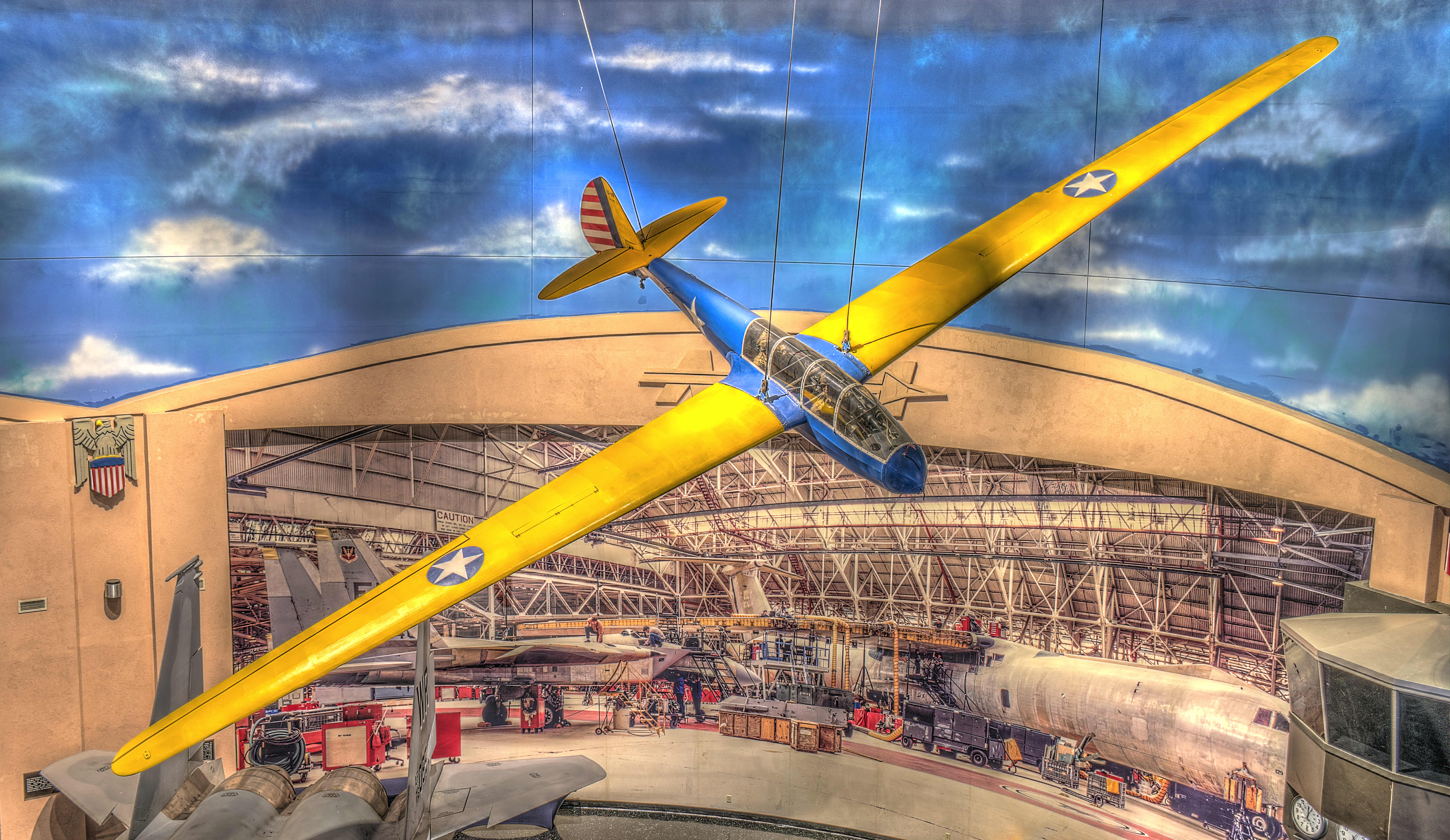
TG-4 on display at the Museum of Aviation

LK-10 Serial #23 formerly registered as N53609 currently under restoration to flying condition in Dayton, Ohio, USA as of 2025.

== Aircraft on display ==
- 42-43688 – TG-4A on static display at the Planes of Fame in Chino, California.
- 42‐43734 – TG-4A on static display at the National Museum of the United States Air Force in Dayton, Ohio.
- 42-43740 – TG-4A on static display at the Museum of Aviation at Warner Robins Air Force Base in Warner Robins, Georgia.
- 42-53078 – TG-4A on static display at the Air Mobility Command Museum at Dover Air Force Base near Dover, Delaware.
- 42-437357 – TG-4A on static display at the National Soaring Museum in Elmira, New York.
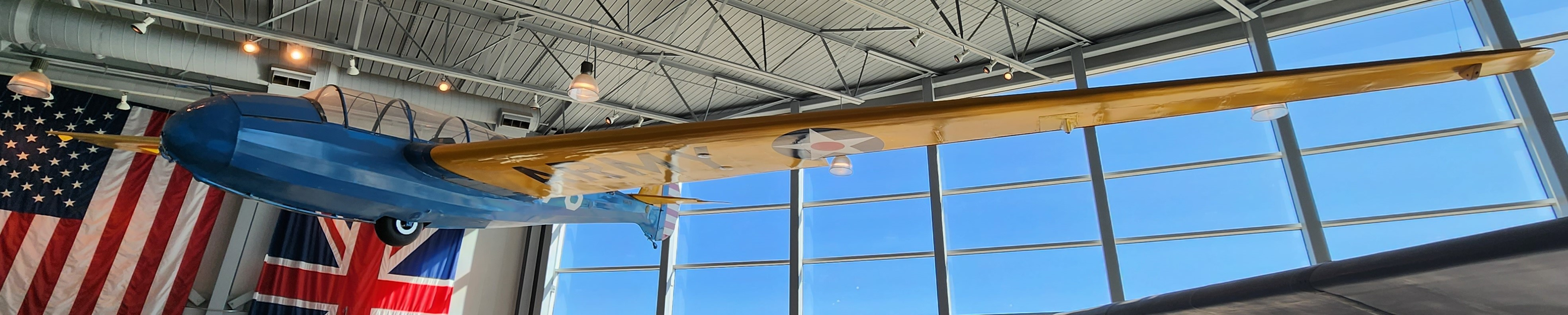
- TG-4 at the Silent Wings Museum.
  42-530727 – TG-4A on static display at the Silent Wings Museum in Lubbock, Texas.
- 28 – TG-4A on static display at the US Southwest Soaring Museum in Moriarty, New Mexico.
- 71 – TG-4A on static display at the Southern Museum of Flight in Birmingham, Alabama.
- 42-53072 – TG-4A on static display at the Military Aviation Museum in Virginia Beach, Virginia.
- LK-10A on static display at the Historic Aircraft Restoration Museum in Maryland Heights, Missouri.
- LK-10A on static display at the Port Townsend Aero Museum in Port Townsend, Washington.
- USAAF 84.42-53027 at Gliding Heritage Centre

== Specifications (LK-10 / TG-4A) ==
Data from The World's Sailplanes:Die Segelflugzeuge der Welt:Les Planeurs du Monde Volume II

General characteristics

- Crew: 2
- Length: 21 ft 4 in (6.5 m)
- Wingspan: 50 ft 0 in (15.24 m)
- Height: 3 ft 7.9 in (1.115 m) at cockpit
- Wing area: 164 sq ft (15.2 m^{2})
- Aspect ratio: 15.1
- Airfoil: root – NACA 4418, tip – NACA 4409
- Empty weight: 476 lb (216 kg) equipped
- Gross weight: 875 lb (397 kg)

Performance

- Stall speed: 38 mph (61 km/h, 33 kn)
- Never exceed speed: 126 mph (203 km/h, 110 kn) * Rough air speed max: 203 km/h (126.1 mph; 109.6 kn)
- Aerotow speed: 203 km/h (126.1 mph; 109.6 kn)
- Winch launch speed: 130 km/h (80.8 mph; 70.2 kn)
- g limits: +6 -3 at 225 km/h (139.8 mph; 121.5 kn)
- Maximum glide ratio: 22 at 80 km/h (49.7 mph; 43.2 kn)
- Rate of sink: 191 ft/min (0.97 m/s) at 73 km/h (45.4 mph; 39.4 kn)
- Wing loading: 5.4 lb/sq ft (26.5 kg/m^{2})

== See also ==
Aircraft of comparable role, configuration, and era

- DFS Kranich

Related lists

- List of World War II military gliders
- List of gliders
