= Operation Omaid =

Planned 2010 military operation

- Part of the War in Afghanistan (2001–2021)
Location	Kandahar, Afghanistan
Status	Planning

Belligerents
Coalition; ISAF Afghanistan	Insurgents (Afghanistan) Taliban insurgents

Strength
Coalition: 11,000; (Afghanistan) 12,000	

Operation Omaid (Dari for Hope) was a planned 2010 military operation by international and Afghan forces to secure the southern city of Kandahar and push back the Taliban. It would have come in the wake of the coalition offensive in Helmand Province focused on Marja, codenamed Operation Moshtarak. According to a Taliban spokesperson, a series of deadly bombings in Kandahar on March 13 was carried out in response to the announcement of the impending operation.
