= Special mission unit =

Largely American term for secretive special forces

A special mission unit (SMU), at one time referred to as a "tier 1" unit, is a designation for the United States military's most highly secretive and elite special operations forces. The term special missions unit is also used in Australia to describe the Special Air Service Regiment. Special mission units have been involved in high-profile military operations, such as the killing of Osama bin Laden and Operation Kayla Mueller, which resulted in the death of Islamic State (IS) leader Abu Bakr al-Baghdadi.

== United States ==
Emblem of the U.S. Joint Special Operations Command

The United States military definition in the Department of Defense Dictionary of Military and Associated Terms comes from Joint Publication 3-05.1 – Joint Special Operations Task Force Operations (JP 3-05.1). JP 3-05.1 defines a "special mission unit" as "a generic term to represent a group of operations and support personnel from designated organizations that is task-organized to perform highly classified activities".

The U.S. government does not acknowledge which units specifically are designated as special missions units, only that they have special mission units within the Joint Special Operations Command (JSOC), which is part of U.S. Special Operations Command (SOCOM). In the early 1990s commander in chief of SOCOM, General Carl Stiner, identified both Delta Force and SEAL Team Six as permanently assigned special mission units in congressional testimony and public statements. In 1998, Under Secretary of Defense for Policy Walter B. Slocombe publicly referred to special mission units during a briefing to the Senate Armed Services Committee: "We have designated special mission units that are specifically manned, equipped and trained to deal with a wide variety of transnational threats" and "These units, assigned to or under the operational control of the U.S. Special Operations Command, are focused primarily on those special operations and supporting functions that combat terrorism and actively counter terrorist use of weapons of mass destruction. These units are on alert every day of the year and have worked extensively with their interagency counterparts."

=== List of United States military SMUs ===
As of 2023, the U.S. military publicly acknowledges the following units as special mission units:

- The Army's 1st Special Forces Operational Detachment – Delta (1st SFOD-D), widely known as Delta Force. JSOC color-coded as Task Force Green.
- The Navy's Naval Special Warfare Development Group (DEVGRU), commonly known as SEAL Team Six. JSOC color-coded as Task Force Blue.
- The Air Force's 24th Special Tactics Squadron (24 STS). JSOC color-coded as Task Force White.
- The Army's Intelligence Support Activity, officially identified only by a series of code names that are replaced every two years. Originally tasked by the Army and subordinate to INSCOM, they were placed under JSOC after the September 11 attacks. JSOC color-coded as Task Force Orange.
- The Army Rangers' Regimental Reconnaissance Company (RRC), part of U.S. Army Special Operations Command (USASOC), has also been referred to as an SMU. JSOC color-coded as Task Force Red (also used to refer to the broader 75th Ranger Regiment when under JSOC control).

Former special mission Units:

- The Army's Asymmetric Warfare Group, which was deactivated in 2021, was referred to as a special mission unit by the Army. Though subordinate to TRADOC, many of AWG's subject-matter experts were former JSOC members.

== Australia ==
The Australian Army's elite Special Air Service Regiment are described as being "special missions units with unique capabilities within the Australian Defence Force". The Regiments are components of Australia's Special Operations Command (SOCOMD), and are tasked with conducting "sensitive strategic operations, special recovery operations, training assistance, special reconnaissance and precision strike and direct action".

The SASR currently has four sabre squadrons, known as 1, 2, 3 and 4 squadron. The first two squadrons rotate through the two roles performed by the regiment; 1 Squadron conducts the counter terrorism/special recovery (CT/SR) role, and the remaining squadrons conduct the warfighting/reconnaissance role, while 4 Squadron is responsible for collecting intelligence and also supports the Australian Secret Intelligence Service.

== Notable operations ==
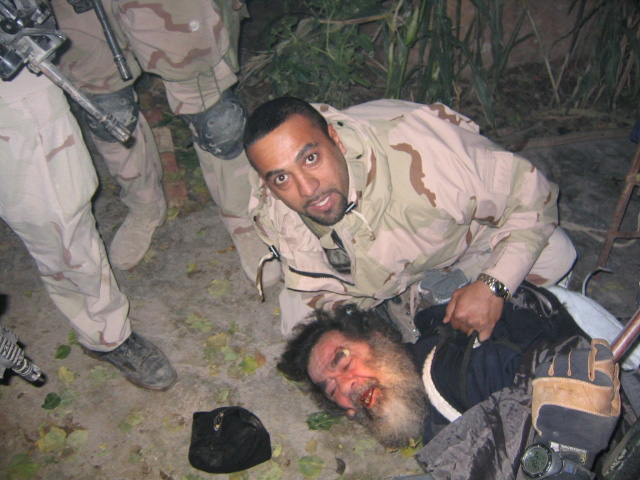
An Iraqi-American military interpreter pictured with Hussein shortly after his capture

- On December 13, 2003, members of Task Force 121 conducted a military operation in Ad-Dawr, Iraq, which led to the capture of former Iraqi president Saddam Hussein who was found hiding in a spider hole.
- On May 2, 2011, Osama bin Laden was killed in a CIA SAD-led operation where U.S. Navy SEALs from DEVGRU's Red Squadron were flown into Abbottabad, Pakistan, by elements of 160th SOAR from Jalalabad, Afghanistan.
- On October 22, 2015, 30 U.S. special operations forces consisting of members of Delta Force, aviators from the 160th SOAR, paramilitary officers from the CIA's Special Activities Center and along with members of the Kurdish Counter-terrorism unit Peshmerga, conducted a raid on an ISIS prison compound north of the town of Hawija in Iraq's Kirkuk province which resulted in the liberation of approximately 70 hostages, including more than 20 members of the Iraqi Security Forces who were to be executed and buried in freshly dug graves. The operation left one Delta operator dead, MSG Joshua Wheeler, the first American to be killed by ISIS insurgents and the first American to be killed in Action in Iraq since November 2011. SGM Thomas Payne, then a SFC, was awarded the Medal of Honor on September 11, 2020, for his actions that day.
- Between October 26 and 27, 2019, in Barisha, Idlib Governorate, Syria, members of 1st SFOD-D (Delta Force) along with paramilitary officers from the CIA's Special Activities Center, Army Rangers from the 75th Ranger Regiment and aviators from the 160th SOAR conducted a raid that resulted in the death of Abu Bakr al-Baghdadi. The raid was named Operation Kayla Mueller after American human rights activist and humanitarian aid worker Kayla Mueller, who was captured in Syria, tortured, and eventually killed by ISIL on February 6, 2015. Baghdadi killed himself when he detonated a suicide belt while seeking to evade the U.S. forces during the raid after reaching a dead end in a tunnel. Two Delta operators and one military working dog (Conan) were injured from Baghdadi's suicide belt but sustained no life threatening injuries.
- On January 3, 2026, Delta Force operators were reportedly responsible for a nighttime raid in Caracas, Venezuela that led to the capture of Venezuelan president Nicolás Maduro.

== See also ==
- Special Mission Unit of the Florida State Guard, a state defense force. Though sharing an identical name, it is not affiliated USSOCOM.
- E Squadron
- Joint Special Operations Command
