= Thomas Payne =

Thomas or Tom Payne may refer to:

== Media and entertainment ==
- Tom Payne (director) (1914–1996), Argentine-Brazilian film director
- Tom Payne (newsreader) (born 1943), Australian television newsreader
- Tom Payne (theatre maker) (born 1979), British actor, satirist, theatre maker and environmental humanities academic
- Tom Payne (actor) (born 1982), English actor

== Military ==
- Thomas Payne (admiral) (fl. 1590s), vice-admiral of Cornwall
- Thomas Payne (soldier) (born 1984), American Medal of Honor recipient

== Politics ==
- Thomas Payn (fl. 1410–1437), English member of Parliament for Melcombe Regis (UK Parliament constituency)
- Thomas Payne (Gloucester MP) (fl. 1507–1560), English member of Parliament
- Thomas Payne (Australian politician) (1862–1932), member of the Victorian Legislative Council

== Sport ==
- Tom Payne (baseball) (fl. 1933), American Negro league baseball player
- Tom Payne (rugby league) (1934–2023), Australian rugby league player
- Tom Payne (basketball) (born 1950), American basketball player
- Tony Payne (darts) (Thomas Anthony Payne, born 1955), American darts player

== Others ==
- Thomas Payne (chaplain) (fl. 1710s–1730s), chaplain of the Levant Company at Constantinople
- Thomas Payne (publisher) (1718–1799), English bookseller and publisher
- Tom Payne, American murder victim lynched in 1927, see Lynching of Tom Payne

== See also ==
- Thomas Paine (disambiguation)
