= 2015 Hawija prison raid =

Joint American-Kurdish special forces operation in Iraq

Coordinates: 35.38775058407929°N 43.77349141047333°E

- Part of the broader US-led intervention in Iraq against ISIL and Operation Inherent Resolve in the War in Iraq (2013–2017)
Date	22 October 2015
Location	Hawija, Iraq
Result	U.S.-Kurdish victory; 70 hostages freed; Prison destroyed

Belligerents
United States; Kurdistan Region	Islamic State

Commanders and leaders
Master Sgt. Joshua Wheeler	Unknown

Units involved
JSOC; Delta Force; 160th SOAR(A); KRSC; Counter Terrorism Department (CTD)	Military of the Islamic State

Strength
30 Delta Force operators; 48 CTD operators; 3 CH-47 Chinooks; 2-3 UH-60 Black Hawks (CAS); 2 F-15E Strike Eagle; Surveillance Drones	Unknown

Casualties and losses
1 U.S. service member killed; 3-4 CTD operators injured	20 ISIS terrorists killed; 6 ISIS terrorists detained
- The prison's location within Iraq, part of the disputed regions, and outside the Kurdistan Region

The 2015 Hawija prison raid or Hawija operation was a joint special operations mission carried out by the U.S. Army's Delta Force, 160th SOAR(A) and the Kurdistan Regional Government's (KRG) Counter-Terrorism Department (CTD) in Hawija, Iraq, with the objective of rescuing prisoners held by the Islamic State (ISIS).

The raid is believed to be the first to be launched inside Iraq since US troops returned to the country following the withdrawal of United States troops from Iraq in 2007–2011.

== Background ==
Earlier in May 2014, U.S. special operations forces had conducted at least one other mission in the Iraq–Syria theater, despite Pentagon spokesman Peter Cook stating that the U.S. military was 'not in an active combat mission' in the region. U.S. service members of Operation Inherent Resolve were only supposed to "advise, train and assist" local forces.

On 21 October, security sources within the Kurdistan Region Security Council (KRSC) reported that ISIS militants were preparing to execute captured Peshmerga fighters at a school, made up of two buildings, which was repurposed to a heavily fortified prison, 7 km (4.34 miles) north of Hawija and 15 km (9 miles) west of the city of Kirkuk. This included reports of increased militant activity in the area and the digging of mass graves, which indicated 'imminent execution' of the hostages. Kurdish intelligence also suggested that the compound in question was home to 20 ISIS commanders. In response, officials from the KRG requested U.S. assistance for an urgent military operation to rescue the hostages. U.S. forces agreed to the request, initially planning only to transport the Kurdish troops to the location.

== Operation ==
At 4:00 a.m. local time on 22 October, Delta Force and CTD operators launched an air assault on the prison from their staging area at Erbil International Airport, with the 160th SOAR(A) providing transport for the task force. 3 CH-47 Chinook helicopters transported, the nearly 80 men strong force, to the area surrounding the prison complex, while 2 UH-60 Black Hawks provided close air support through machine gun fire. Shortly after, roads and bridges leading to the area had been bombed by coalition fighter jets, to cut off any potential reinforcements. The assault was being monitored by U.S. surveillance drones.

Although the plan called for the Kurds to do the fighting, Master Sgt. Joshua Wheeler, who commanded the raid, and his unit of Delta Force operators, sprang into action to actively support the operation, after the CTD was unable to blow up the prison's wall and came under heavy fire. The U.S.-Kurdish task force split up into two teams, one which was led by Wheeler and another team led by Sgt. Thomas Payne. Wheeler's unit entered the prison courtyard, where he provided covering fire that enabled the force to advance to the 1st Main Building. In doing so, he was mortally wounded by small-arms fire coming from barricaded positions, and Wheeler's group was repelled in its attempts to enter the building.

The second task force, led by Payne, climbed over the compound walls and moved inside the 2nd Main Building where they were met by only light-resistance, and managed to rescue around 36 hostages. Later they moved onto the roof of the 1st Main Building to assist Wheeler's group, from where they engaged ISIS fighters inside of it. The elevated position drew heavy fire, and forced several ISIS militants to detonate their suicide vests.

Meanwhile, U.S. Air Force F-15E Strike Eagles, F-16C Fighting Falcons, and several armed unmanned aerial vehicles conducted airstrikes in surrounding areas, aimed at neutralizing ISIS elements, confusing them, and disrupting their movements.

Thomas Payne's group, which went off of the building's roof, began to storm it through its main entrance on the ground, while it was ablaze, and inspired the rest of the rescue force to join them. Inside the 1st Main Building, and under heavy fire, the task force rescued the remaining hostages and escorted them out of the prison back to the helicopters. One of the hostages was dragged by Payne himself as he froze in place, being overwhelmed with the situation. To the surprise of those involved, none of the hostages were Peshmergas or Kurdish; instead, the rescued were primarily Iraqi Arabs, including former members of the Iraqi Security Forces and individuals whom ISIS had accused of spying. In the two-hour long operation 20 ISIS militans were killed, six detained, two of which were considered 'leaders', one U.S. service member was killed, three to four CTD operators were injured and 70 hostages rescued. Video footage, which was later released by the KRG, showed what happened when the special forces went inside one of the buildings. A Kurdish operator's helmet camera showed his weapon pointed toward a barred window illuminated by a glow, possibly from a fire. Other scenes depicted soldiers moving through dark offices with large black-and-white ISIS flags at one end. In another sequence, four men in robes with their hands on their heads were escorted through a doorway and searched. The operator wearing the body camera was seen emptying the men's shirt pockets, patting them down, and then moving them quickly along the hallway. Delta Force operators speaking English were audible on the footage, with one instructing, "Hold that guy [hostage] there!".

The compound was bombed and completely destroyed by F-15E Strike Eagle jets after the helicopters evacuated the task force and the hostages.

== Aftermath ==
Wheeler was the first U.S. soldier to die in combat against the Islamic State. He was awarded a Purple Heart posthumously. The U.S. Defense secretary at the time, Ash Carter, applauded Wheeler as a hero, saying "his response enabled the mission to succeed." His death sparked discussions about the nature of U.S. involvement in the fight against ISIS. In response Carter said that "the plan was not for the U.S. advise-and-assist and accompanying forces to enter the compound or be involved in the firefight," but that "[Wheeler] is someone who saw the team that he was advising and assisting coming under attack, and he made it possible for them to be effective, and in doing that, lost his own life."

Carter said the U.S. and its Kurdish partners collected valuable intelligence at the scene, including documents and electronics. This, he said, shows "the great value of raids of this kind," and that he expects more operations of this type to happen. The KRSC considered the Hawija operation to be the "single most significant joint rescue operation based out of the Kurdistan region conducted deep in ISIS territory" to date. It also offered its "heartfelt condolences" to the family and friends of Joshua Wheeler and expressed its gratefulness to the "counterterrorism professionals" for their bravery.

The central government in Baghdad did not know the operation was taking place until "they started receiving phone calls from reporters."

On 11 September 2020, Thomas Payne, was awarded the Medal of Honor for his actions that day by President Donald Trump, becoming the first living Delta Force recipient of the Medal of Honor and the first Medal of Honor recipient for Operation Inherent Resolve.

== See also ==
- List of operations conducted by Delta Force
