= Cultural depictions of the Anarchy =

Cultural depictions of the Anarchy, a long-running civil war in England between 1135 and 1153, has furnished the background of some major fictional portrayals. These include:

- Charles Macfarlane's novel A Legend of Reading Abbey (1845) is an early novel about the conflict.
- George Shipway's novel Knight in Anarchy (1969) centres on a knight sworn to Geoffrey de Mandeville as he tries to gain power in the Anarchy.
- Cecelia Holland's The Earl, also published as Hammer for Princes (1971), gives a vivid description of the last year of the struggle, Prince Henry's invasion of England and his eventual recognition as King Stephen's heir.
- Graham Shelby's 1972 novel The Oath and the Sword (a.k.a. The Villains of the Piece), focuses on Empress Matilda's faithful supporter Brien FitzCount, Lord of Wallingford, through the years of the Anarchy.
- Jean Plaidy's Passionate Enemies (c. 1976) from her multi-volume treatment of the British monarchy, captures the mood of the period and the personalities of Matilda and Stephen.
- Ellis Peters set her series of Brother Cadfael books (published 1977–1994) against the background of the Anarchy.
- The 1978 BBC production The Devil's Crown opens with a scene depicting the Treaty of Wallingford.
- Diana Norman's novel Morning Gift (published in 1985) follows the trials of a Norman noblewoman as she struggles to keep safe her lands, her young son, and her people during the period of the Anarchy.
- Ken Follett's novel The Pillars of the Earth (published in 1989) is set during this time, and was adapted to an eight-part TV miniseries debuting in the U.S. on Starz and Canada on The Movie Network/Movie Central on July 23, 2010. It premiered in the UK on Channel 4, October 16, 2010, and on CBC Television January 8, 2011. The book's plot is less concerned with the war as such, and more with how the weakening of Royal authority gave a free hand to various aristocrats, such as the book's particularly rapacious Earl.
- Sharon Kay Penman's 750-page novel When Christ and His Saints Slept (published in 1995) gives a comprehensive and informative view of the entire power struggle.
- The Anarchy is depicted in the 2011 Elizabeth Chadwick novel about Empress Matilda, Lady of the English.
- Elizabeth Chadwick's A Place Beyond Courage (published 2008, Sphere) is set during the Anarchy, focusing on the life of John FitzGilbert the Marshal. Her most recent novel The Lady of the English focuses on Matilda and on Henry's young wife Adeliza.
- The Anarchy is the background for the historical novel Winter Siege (2014) by Ariana Franklin and Samantha Norman.
- Doppelgangster's The Anarchy (1138-53) by Tobias Manderson-Galvin and Kerith Manderson-Galvin (2025, KXT-On-Broadway and Theatre Works) is a postdramatic experimental theatre work set in a walk-through guide to an eponymous video game set during the Anarchy

Additionally, the Anarchy is the inspiration for the fictional civil war called ‘the Dance of the Dragons’ between princess Rhaenyra Targaryen and her half-brother King Aegon II Targaryen, depicted in George R. R. Martin's novella The Princess and the Queen (published 2013 in the anthology Dangerous Women) and fictional history book Fire & Blood. It is set in the same universe as his fantasy novel series A Song of Ice and Fire. The Dance was adapted into the HBO series House of the Dragon (2022).
