= Thomas Paine (disambiguation) =

Thomas Paine (1737–1809) was an English-American political activist, philosopher, political theorist, and revolutionary

Thomas Paine may also refer to:

- Thomas O. Paine (1921–1992), American scientist and NASA administrator
- Thomas Paine (privateer) (1632–1715), colonial American privateer
- John Kricfalusi, who took Thomas Paine as his pen name when writing for Film Threat and Wild Cartoon Kingdom

== See also ==
- Thomas Payne (disambiguation)
