= Asymmetric Warfare Group =

United States Army special mission unit

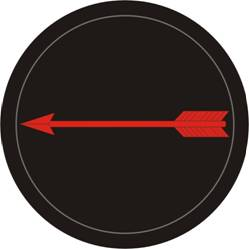
- Asymmetric Warfare Group shoulder sleeve insignia
- Active: 2006–2021
- Country: United States
- Branch: United States Army
- Type: Operational Advisory Support
- Role: Advisory and solution development
- Size: ~ 377
- Part of: United States Army Training and Doctrine Command
- Garrison/HQ: Fort Meade, Maryland
- Nickname: AWG
- Motto: "Think. Adapt. Anticipate."
- Colors: Black & Red
- Anniversaries: March 8, 2006
- Engagements: Iraq War; War in Afghanistan
- Decorations: Army Superior Unit Award
- Website: www.awg.army.mil

Commanders
- July 2019 - March 2021 (inactivation): Colonel Scott Shaw
- July 2017 - July 2019: Colonel Timothy O’Brien
- July 2015 - July 2017: Colonel Michael Loos
- August 2013 - July 2015: Colonel John P. Petkosek
- July 2011 - August 2013: Colonel Patrick J. Mahaney Jr.
- July 2009 - July 2011: Colonel James M. Mis
- January 2006 (activation) - July 2009: Colonel Robert Shaw

Insignia
- Distinctive unit insignia

The Asymmetric Warfare Group (often shortened to "AWG") was a United States Army special mission unit created during the war on terrorism to mitigate various threats with regard to asymmetric warfare. The unit was headquartered at Fort Meade, Maryland and had a training facility (the Asymmetric Warfare Training Center) at Fort A.P. Hill, Virginia which was specialized in breaching and subterranean warfare. The unit provided the linkage between Training and Doctrine Command (TRADOC) and the operational Army, and reported directly to the commanding general of TRADOC.

In March 2021, the AWG held a casing of the colors ceremony and officially inactivated.

== Organization ==
The Asymmetric Warfare Group was made up by a headquarters and headquarters detachment and four squadrons:

- Able Squadron (Operations)
- Baker Squadron (Operations)
- Charlie Squadron (Operations)
- Dog Squadron (Concepts & Integration)
- Easy Squadron (Training)

Each squadron was commanded by a lieutenant colonel and subsequently divided into troops each commanded by a major. AWG maintained forward deployed subject matter experts with all of the major combatant commands. Consisting of Army servicemembers, Department of the Army civilians, and contracted subject matter experts, the unit held an authorized strength of 377.

== Mission ==
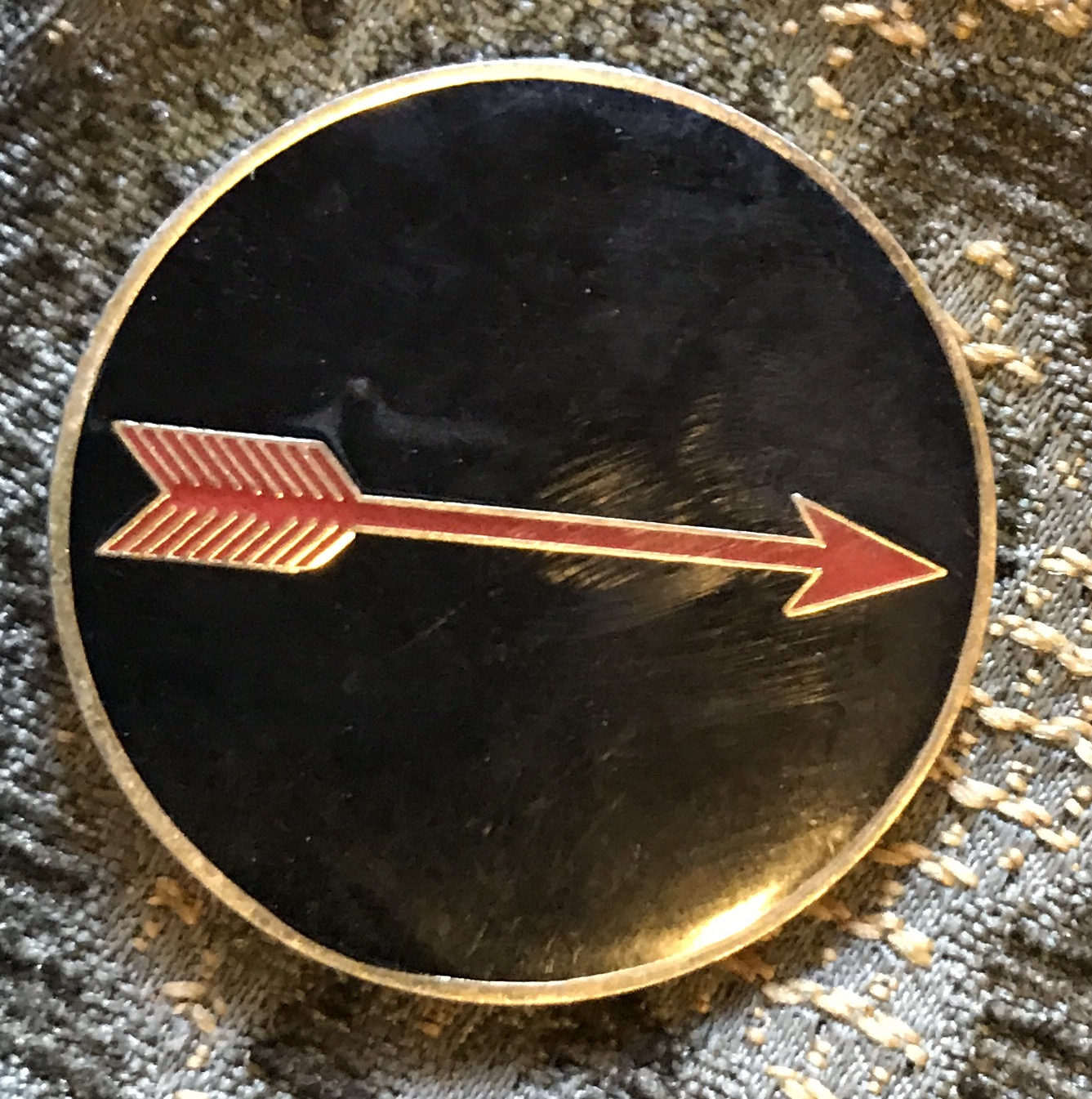
Front and back face of Asymmetric Warfare Group coin.

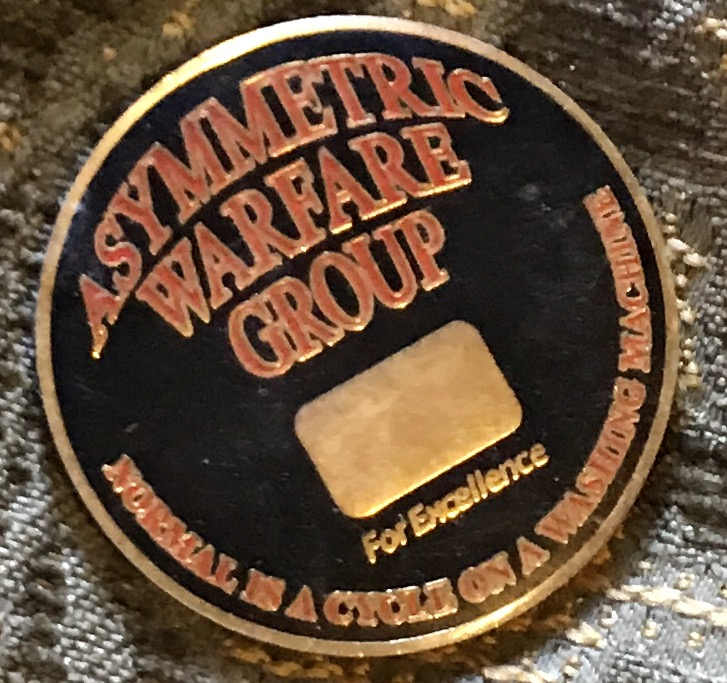
Front and back face of Asymmetric Warfare Group coin.

The U.S. Army Asymmetric Warfare Group (AWG) provided operational advisory assistance in support of Army and joint force commanders to enhance the combat effectiveness of the operating force and enable the defeat of asymmetric threats. AWG was the Army’s focal point for identifying asymmetric threats, enemy vulnerabilities and friendly capability gaps through first-hand observations. AWG key tasks include supporting Army and Joint Force Commanders by advising and assisting predeployment and in-theater forces; deploying and sustaining AWG forces worldwide to observe, assess, and disseminate information with regard to asymmetric threats; assisting in the identification, development, integration, and transition of material and non-material solutions for both offensive and defensive countermeasures; influencing culture to form a more innovative and adaptive force; and assessing, selecting, and training unit members.

AWG was designed to rapidly identify, develop, assess and disseminate solutions—both physical products, and doctrinal improvements—across the full spectrum of organizations in order to mitigate asymmetric vulnerabilities through first-hand observations and the deployment of civilian and military subject-matter experts directly into the field in-theater.

AWG in particular was tasked with countering the asymmetric threat of improvised explosive device (IED) proliferation against conventional and special operations forces. AWG would embed subject matter experts within combat units, observe both friendly and enemy tactics, techniques, and procedures (TTPs) and best practices, and provide advisory assistance and equipment improvement recommendations to mitigate the threat. AWG would then disseminate those best practices throughout the Army (more rapidly than through a traditional approval and publication process). AWG would also recommend "material solutions"—either commercial off the shelf products, or modifications to existing military equipment, to mitigate these threats. For instance, in the counter-IED mission, AWG was tasked with solving challenges faced by Army units conducing route clearance patrols in Iraq, who were being exposed to IED risk when removing debris from roads; as a material solution, AWG developed tools such as "Iron Scrape" to rapidly clear the debris and remove the potential IED hiding spots. Similarly another material solution called "Air Digger" was developed to allow Buffalo armored vehicles used on the route clearance patrols to clear dirt and debris from a suspected IED without triggering a detonation that would compromise forensic evidence (to track, locate, and neutralize the bomb maker).

AWG also regularly deployed in support of JCETs and assisted with the training of foreign SOF forces in foreign internal defense.

== History ==
The U.S. Army Asymmetric Warfare Group (AWG) was charged with identifying Army and joint force capability gaps to DOTMLPF-P, and developing solutions to those gaps. It further seeks to identify enemy threats and develop methods to defeat those threats.

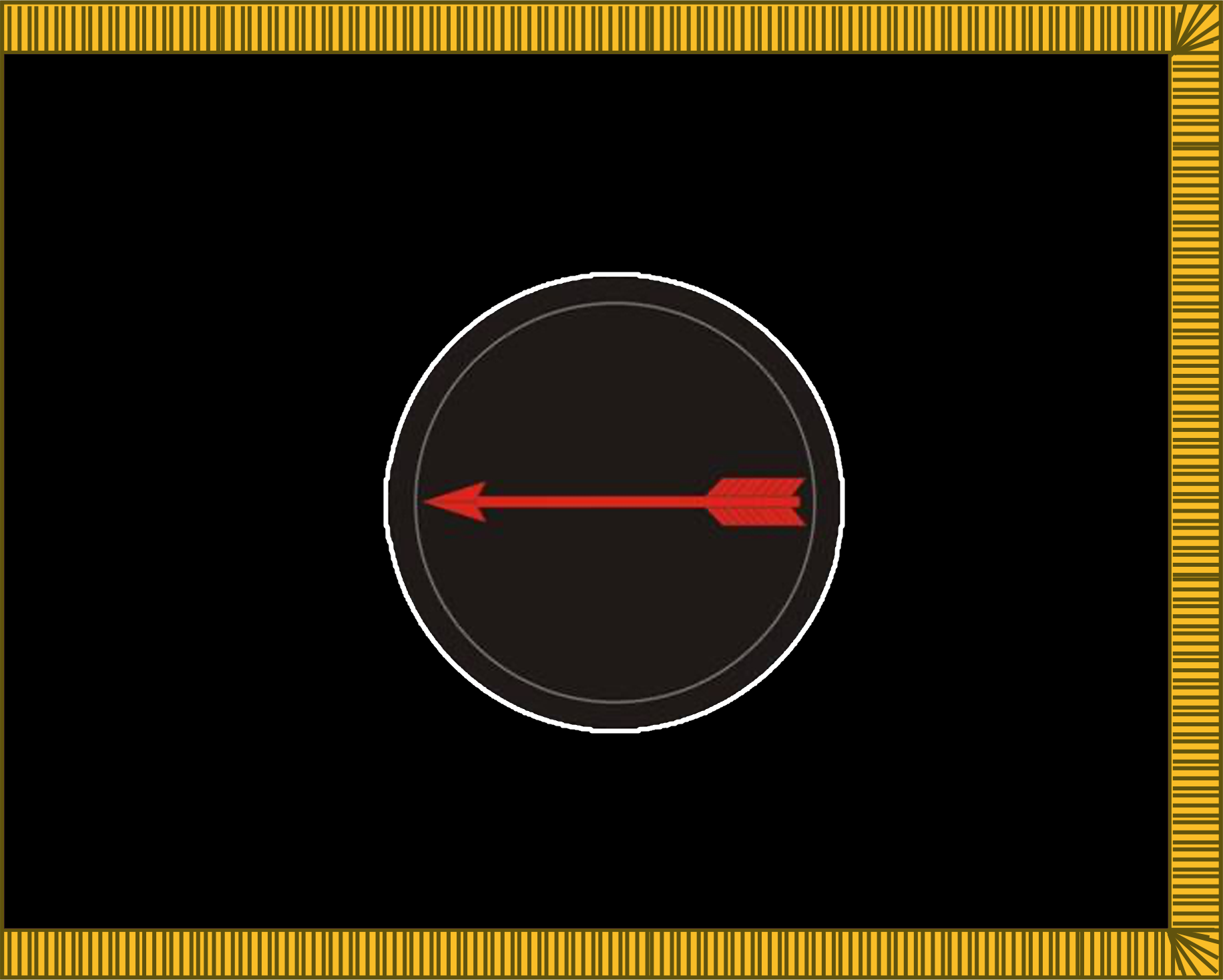
Asymmetric Warfare Group Flag

2016 marked the group's 10th anniversary. In January, 2006, the AWG was established as a Field Operating Agency under the operational control of the Deputy Chief of Staff, G-3/5/7, Headquarters, Department of the Army. The AWG was activated on March 8, 2006, at Fort Meade, MD. The AWG was assigned to the TRADOC on November 11, 2011 as a direct reporting unit to the commanding general. The assignment to TRADOC enabled enhanced cooperation with the Army Capabilities Integration Center, Combined Arms Center, and the Centers of Excellence. Since 2011, AWG had experienced a significant growth in Operational Advisory support missions, and activated its third Operational Squadron in 2013. With this enhanced capacity, AWG provided observations, analysis, and solution development into both the operational and institutional forces of the Army. AWG's operational advisors deployed globally to complex operating environments to understand the current and emerging challenges to anticipate the character of future conflict. While their focus was on assisting the operating force, they ensured that any lessons learned were passed to the institutional Army for long-term integration and to enhance the development of our generating force.

AWG conducted vulnerability assessments to identify security risks for the Army, bridge the skill and knowledge gap between Special Operations Forces and the regular Army, and assists the Army in developing and implementing the Army Learning Model through AWG's unique instructing methods, or ASLTE, Adaptive Soldier Leader Training and Education.

Assessed current and emerging threats: AWG determines friendly force vulnerabilities and enemy threat capabilities and then develops programs of instruction to raise situational awareness and understanding of identified problems. AWG then seeks to integrate the programs of instruction into Combat Training Center (e.g., National Training Center) rotations, as well as in-theater Joint Reception Staging Onward Movement and Integration (JRSOI) training. JRSOI is the process that transitions deploying or redeploying forces, consisting of personnel, equipment, and materiel into forces capable of meeting the Combatant Commander's (CCDR's) operational requirements or returns them to their parent organization or Service. In addition, AWG evaluates engagement Tactics, Techniques, and Procedures (TTPs), and works with the Fires Center of Excellence to institutionalize its findings. AWG has also created a compendium of Islamic State of Iraq and the Levant (ISIL) techniques and procedures, probable scenarios, and ways to counter them, which are distributed in theater and are available through the Center for Army Lessons Learned (CALL). AWG developed a similar product addressing Russian hybrid warfare based on Ukraine.

Understanding a Complex Operating Environment: through AWG's support to Regionally Aligned Forces and Special Operations Forces, they identified the requirement to bring jungle skills back into the U.S. Army. AWG incorporated lessons learned into the 25th Infantry Division in Lightning Academy and created handbooks for CALL. In addition, observations and trend analysis from globally-deployed operational advisors identified the requirement to raise awareness of tunneling and subterranean operations. AWG created handbooks and references for distribution by CALL. AWG continuously deploys operational advisors in support of theater security cooperation plans and events to identify how the complex environment is changing around the world. A handbook was developed by AWG after working with Combined Joint Task Force – Horn of Africa to inform future leaders and planners of the operational challenges a CJTF has in an environment where the Department of Defense (DoD) is not the lead agency.

On October 2, 2020 it was announced that the Army planned to close the AWG by September 30, 2021. On May 13, 2021, the AWG officially inactivated.
