= List of operations conducted by Delta Force =

US Army special operations force missions

This is an incomplete list of operations conducted by the United States Army special forces group known as Delta Force.

== Operation Eagle Claw ==
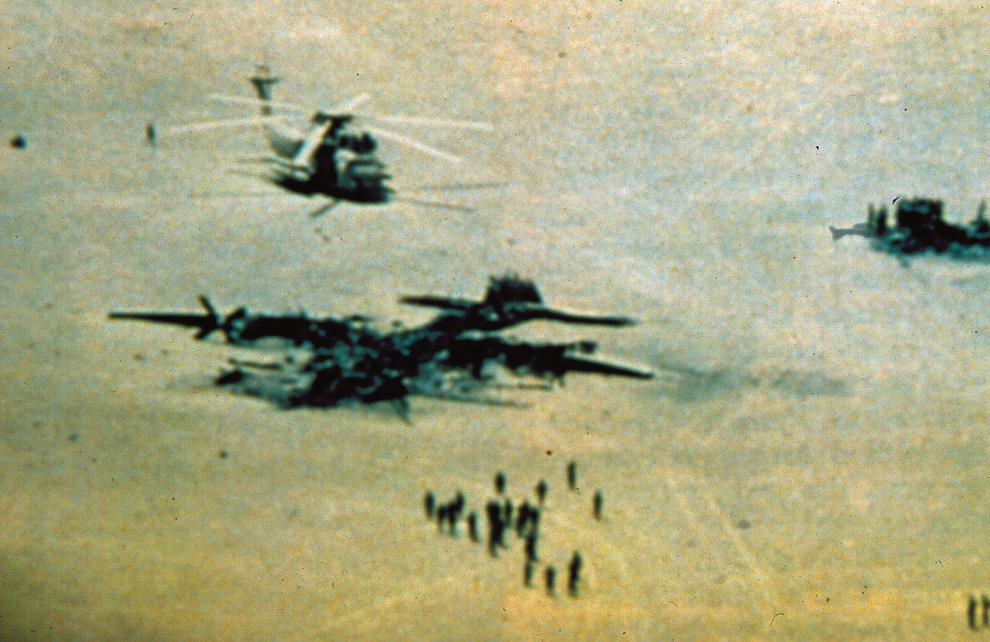
Abandoned, crashed and burned out aircraft at Desert One

Delta's very first tasking began the night after they successfully completed their operational assessment on 4 November 1979 when Iranian students stormed the U.S. Embassy in Tehran. Delta was immediately tasked to rescue the hostages and began training on storming the embassy with a compound mock-up built by military combat engineers at Eglin Air Force Base, Florida, while putting together a complex multi-stage rescue operation involving a rigid schedule and demanding helicopter night-flying skills using first-generation night vision goggles.

The rescue force was to be inserted by air force special operations C-130s at night to a remote location in the desert outside Tehran called Desert One, and meet with a group of marine RH-53 Sea Stallion helicopters, flown in from the U.S.S. Nimitz aircraft carrier staged nearby in the Indian Ocean. The helicopters would then be refueled on the ground at Desert One by refueling specialists using specially designed fuel bladders inside the C-130s. The refueled helicopters and the rescue force (composed of Delta and Rangers) would then fly to a hidden staging location outside Tehran and hide until the next evening.

On the evening of the rescue, Delta would drive to the embassy compound using pre-staged trucks, assault the compound and rescue the hostages, and take them across the street to a soccer stadium where the helicopters would have landed to extract them and take them to a nearby airfield which the Rangers would have assaulted and captured. C-141s would then extract the entire rescue force with hostages and the helicopters would be destroyed and left behind.

The helicopters caused the cancellation of the mission at Desert One, when enough helicopters were lost from attrition due to sandstorms, pilot fatigue, and failed hydraulics that the on-site commanders acknowledged helicopter numbers were below the required minimum for that stage to go forward and recommended to President Carter that he cancel the mission, which he did. As the entire rescue force was leaving Desert One, one of the helicopters crashed into a U.S. Air Force special operations C-130 and in the ensuing explosion and panic the helicopters were abandoned en masse leaving unauthorized mission plans which fell into Iranian hands, ruining any chance of a possible second covert rescue attempt following a brief regrouping period.

== Central American operations ==
Delta has seen action extensively in Central America, fighting the Salvadoran revolutionary group Farabundo Marti National Liberation Front and assisting the Central Intelligence Agency-funded Contras in Nicaragua.

== Operation Urgent Fury ==
A second Delta mission launched (October 25, 1983 to November 2, 1983) in the early daylight hours of the first day of Operation Urgent Fury in Grenada was to assault Richmond Hill Prison and rescue the political prisoners being held there. Built on the remains of an old eighteenth-century fort, the prison could not be approached by foot from three sides except through dense jungle growing on the steep mountainside. The fourth side was approachable by a narrow neck of road with high trees running along it. The prison offered no place for a helicopter assault force to land.

Richmond Hill formed one side of a steep valley. Across and above the valley, on a higher peak, was another old fort, Fort Frederick, which housed a Grenadian garrison. From Fort Frederick, the garrison easily commanded the slopes and floor of the ravine below with small arms and machine gun fire. It was into this valley and under the guns of the Grenadian garrison that the six Blackhawk helicopters of Delta Force, B Squadron flew at 6:30 that morning.

The helicopters of Task Force 160 flew into the valley and turned their noses toward the prison. Unable to land, the Delta raiders began to rappel down ropes dragging from the doors of the helicopters. Suddenly, as men swung wildly from the rappelling ropes, the helicopters were caught in a cross-fire from the front, as forces from the prison opened fire; and more devastatingly, from behind, as enemy forces in Fort Frederick rained heavy small arms and machine gun fire down from above.

According to eyewitness accounts by Grenadian civilians, a number of helicopters that could, flew out of the valley. In at least one instance, a helicopter pilot turned back without orders and refused to fly into the assault. Charges of cowardice, later dropped, were filed against the Nightstalker pilot by members of Delta who wanted to be inserted.

== Aeropostal Flight 252 ==
On 29 July 1984, after Venezuelan Aeropostal Flight 252 departed from Caracas in Venezuela, it was hijacked by two men and forced to land on the island of Curaçao which is part of the Netherlands Antilles. Two days later, a team of 12 Venezuelan commandos successfully stormed the McDonnell Douglas DC-9, killed the two hijackers and rescued all 79 passengers aboard. An unknown number of Delta Force members who had been flown in acted as advisors for the Venezuelan commando team.

== Operation Round Bottle ==
Delta planned an operation for three teams to go into Beirut, Lebanon, to rescue Westerners held by Hezbollah. The action was terminated when negotiations appeared to promise to deliver the hostages in exchange for arms. The operation was ultimately aborted in the aftermath of the Los Angeles Times story that revealed the Iran–Contra affair.

== Operation Heavy Shadow ==
Operation for the capture/killing of drug lord Pablo Escobar. William G. Boykin was said to be the commander of this operation.

Delta Force commandos were inserted after Intelligence Support Activity (ISA) operatives were in Colombia. The ISA operatives were using Beechcraft 300 and Beechcraft 350 aircraft outfitted with special surveillance equipment to determine Escobar's location. Joint Special Operations Command would rotate Delta and DEVGRU detachments in Colombia throughout the hunt. Their mission was limited to training and assisting the Search Bloc, but the aggressive operators found ways to be included on their trainees' missions.

Escobar's phone was tracked and he was killed in an operation. The shooter has been suggested to be a Delta Force sniper but there has not been any evidence to support this theory. In his book Killing Pablo, Mark Bowden suggests that a Delta Force sniper may have killed Colombian drug lord Pablo Escobar. There is no hard evidence of this though and credit is generally attributed to Colombian security forces, particularly the Search Bloc.

== Panama ==
Before Operation Just Cause by US forces took place, there were key operations that were tasked to Special Operations Forces. Operation Acid Gambit was an operation tasked to Delta to rescue and recover Kurt Muse, held captive in Carcel Modelo, a prison in Panama City. Another important operation that was assigned to Delta was Operation Nifty Package, the apprehension of General Manuel Antonio Noriega.

== Operation Desert Shield/Desert Storm ==
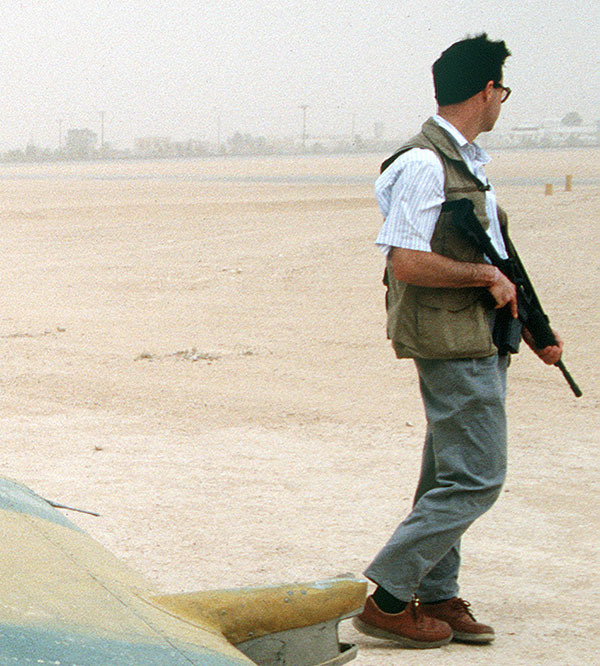
A Delta Force operator as a part of personal security detail (PSD) to General Norman Schwarzkopf.

Delta was deployed during Desert Storm to the region and tasked with a number of responsibilities. These included supporting regular army units that were providing close protection detail for General Norman Schwarzkopf in Saudi Arabia. Army public relations officers tried to play down Schwarzkopf's growing number of bodyguards. Delta was tasked with hunting for SCUD missiles alongside the British Special Air Service and other coalition special forces. On the last day of the ground war, Delta sniper teams located 26 SCUD missiles in western Iraq, each aimed at Israel. Armed with high-powered .50-caliber sniper rifles from as far as 3,000 yards, Delta squadrons punctured the missiles' fuel tanks and killed their crews. Had the SCUDs been launched, Saddam Hussein's last-gasp attempt at luring Israel into the conflict might have been successful. With Israel in the fight, the delicate Arab coalition opposing Hussein could have been unraveled. General Schwarzkopf who was the commander of the coalition against Saddam Hussein thanked the Delta Force with a letter sent to them which read in part, "You guys kept Israel out of the war!"

== Operation Gothic Serpent ==
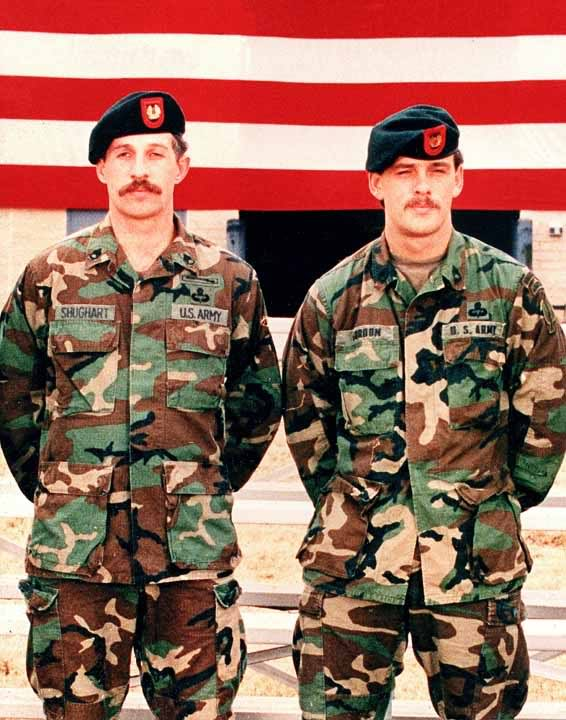
Medal of Honor recipients SFC Randy Shughart and MSG Gary Gordon

On 3 October 1993, members of Delta Force, C Squadron were sent in with U.S. Army Rangers in the conflict in Mogadishu, Somalia code-named Operation Gothic Serpent.

They were tasked with securing several of Mohammed Farah Aidid's top lieutenants, as well as a few other targets of high value. The mission was compromised after two MH-60L Blackhawk helicopters were shot down by Somali Militia. This resulted in an ongoing battle for the next 18 hours and led to the deaths of five Delta operators: MSG Timothy Lynn Martin, SFC Earl Robert Fillmore, Jr., SSG Daniel Darrell Busch, SFC Randy Shughart, and MSG Gary I. Gordon (a sixth operator, SFC Matthew Loren Rierson, was killed by mortar fire some days later), six Rangers, five army aviation crew, and two 10th Mountain Division soldiers. Estimates of Somali deaths range from 133 by an Aidid sector commander to an estimate of 1500 to 2000 by the US Ambassador to Somalia. Two Delta operators, Master Sergeant Gary Gordon and Sergeant First Class Randy Shughart, were posthumously awarded the Medal of Honor for the actions they took and the sacrifice they made to help protect the life of Durant and the crew of Super Six Four (callsign of one of the crashed Black Hawks). They were the first soldiers to posthumously receive the Medal of Honor since the Vietnam War. In 1999, writer Mark Bowden published the book Black Hawk Down: A Story of Modern War, which chronicles the events that surrounded 3 October 1993 Battle of Mogadishu. The book, in a short brief, relates Delta Force's involvement in the operations that occurred before the events leading to the battle. The book was turned into a film by director Ridley Scott in 2001.

== Operation Uphold Democracy ==
Delta Force took part in Operation Uphold Democracy in Haiti; their known role was to serve as bodyguards for visiting UN officials and diplomats, working together with the Polish counter-terrorist unit GROM.

== Counter-terrorist training ==
In January 1997, a small Delta advance team and six members of the British SAS were sent to Lima, Peru, immediately following the takeover of the Japanese ambassador's residence. They also provide security for American diplomats and the Olympic team USA while traveling in other countries or participating in the Olympic Games, which continues to this day. During the 2016 Rio Olympic Games in Brazil, members of Delta Force's G-squadron were in charge of team USA's security. Under diplomatic cover, Delta Force, along with its naval counterpart, DEVGRU, also protect the president when he is in countries that are experiencing violence and unrest, and where the United States Secret Service's capabilities are limited. The most notable example of this was during President George W. Bush's surprise Thanksgiving visit to American troops in Iraq in November 2003. And was highlighted more recently by President Joe Biden’s visit to Israel in October 2023 after the 2023 Hamas-led attack on Israel.

== Seattle WTO ==
Members of Delta Force were involved in preparing security for the 1999 Seattle WTO Conference, specifically against a chemical weapon attack.

== Operation Enduring Freedom – Afghanistan ==
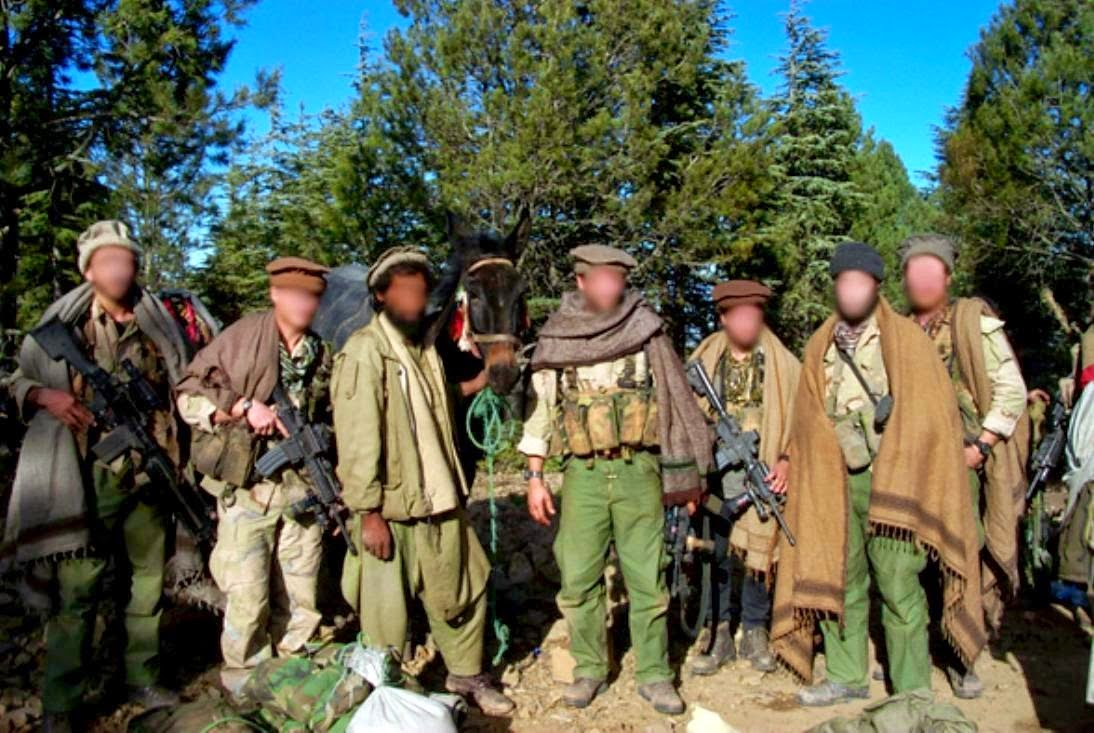
Delta force operators disguised as Afghan civilians

Delta Force was involved in operations against the Taliban in Afghanistan since 2001, following the September 11 attacks.

=== Beginning of operations against the Taliban ===
In early October 2001, Delta Force were part of the newly established Task Force Sword. It was a black SOF unit under direct command of JSOC (Joint Special Operations Command). This was a so-called hunter-killer force whose primary objective was of capturing or killing senior leadership and HVT within both al-Qaeda and the Taliban; the Delta component was codenamed Task Force Green.

Delta Force was also part of Task Force Bowie – an intelligence integration and fusion activity manned by personnel from all OEF-A (Operation Enduring Freedom – Afghanistan) participating units, both US, coalition and a number of civilian intelligence and law enforcement agencies. within this TF, Delta operators were part of AFO (Advanced Force Operations) – a 45-man reconnaissance unit made up of a Delta Force recce specialists augmented by selected SEALs from DEVGRU and supported by ISA's technical experts.

AFO had been raised to support TF Sword and was tasked with intelligence preparation of the battlefield, working closely with the CIA and reported directly to TF Sword. AFO conducted covert reconnaissance – sending small 2 or 3 man teams into al-Qaeda 'Backyard' along the border with Pakistan, the AFO operators would deploy observation posts to watch and report enemy movements and numbers as well as environmental reconnaissance; much of the work was done on foot or ATVs.

=== Raid on compound ===
On the night of 19 October 2001, during the coalition invasion of Afghanistan, a squadron of Delta Force operatives supported by Rangers from Task Force Sword conducted an operation in the hills above Kandahar at a location known as Objective Gecko – its target was Mullah Omar, who was suspected to be at his summer retreat. Four MH-47E helicopters took off from the USS Kitty Hawk (which was serving as an SOF base) in the Indian Ocean, the assaulters met no resistance on target and there was no sign of the Taliban leader, the assaulters switched to exploiting the target location for any intelligence.

As the assault teams prepared to extract, a sizeable Taliban force approached a compound and engaged the US force with small arms fire and RPGs. The Delta Force operators and Rangers engaged the insurgents and heavy firefight developed, an attached Combat Controller directed fire from the orbiting AC-130s and MH-60L DAPs, allowing the assault force to break contact and withdraw to an emergency HLZ (Helicopter Landing Zone). Some 30 Taliban fighters were killed in the firefight, there were no US servicemen killed but 12 Delta operators were wounded.

=== Giving medical aid to wounded Green Berets ===
On 5 December 2001 a 2,000-lb GPS-guided bomb landed among the Green Berets from ODA 574, killing 3 members and wounding the rest of the team. Over 20 of Hamid Karzai's militia (fighting alongside the ODA) were also killed and Karzai himself slightly wounded. A Delta Force unit that had been operating nearby on a classified reconnaissance mission arrived in their Pinzgauers and secured the site, while Delta medics worked with wounded Green Berets until they were medevaced by two MH-53M special operations helicopters from the 20th Special Operations Squadron.

=== Battle of Tora Bora ===
During the Battle of Tora Bora, 40 operators from Delta Force's A squadron were deployed to assist the overstretched CIA and Green Beret teams there. They assumed tactical command of the Battle from the CIA. With Delta were several members of the British Special Boat Service. The Delta squadron commander requested that his operators be deployed in blocking positions (a CIA Jawbreaker team leader request for the 3rd Battalion, 75th Ranger Regiment was made but was denied) along potential escape routes and to act as an anvil or the scattering of aerially sown mines, but these were denied by General Tommy Franks.

A Delta Recce team, callsign 'Jackal', spotted a tall man wearing a camouflage jacket with a large number of fighters entering a cave. The Recce team called in multiple airstrikes on the obvious presumption that it was Bin Laden, but later DNA analysis from the remains did not match Bin Laden's.

=== Operation Anaconda ===
In February 2002, Delta force carried out missions in the Shahikot Valley in preparation for Operation Anaconda. In the planning phase of the operation, the commander of Delta Force, LTC Pete Blaber, ruled out any helicopter infiltration of AFOs into the area so as not to alert the terrorists in the valley. In addition to AFOs conducting reconnaissance of routes into and around the valley on modified Polaris ATVs, two teams climbed high into the mountains and gorges of the Shahikot to conduct environmental reconnaissance. Their vital intelligence was fed back to the AFO and proved invaluable once the operation started.

On 28 February, on the eve of the operation, three AFO teams covertly infiltrated the valley. One code named Juliet, made up of five Delta operators with a signals intelligence specialist from the ISA, entered the valley on ATVs from the north, driving through the night in adverse weather conditions, eventually reaching a covert hide on the eastern side of the valley. Another team code-named India, made up of three Delta operators and an attached ISA operator, walked into the valley through the same conditions to a hide in the southwest of the valley, known as the "fish hook".

On 2 March, the AFOs fought all day with the conventional troops of Task Force Rakkasan and the Green Berets of Task Force Hammer, calling in continuous airstrikes on al-Qaeda positions. Later, the Task Force 11 leadership essentially ordered the Delta AFO commander to pass control of the AFO teams involved in the operation to the SEALs of Task Force Blue, who were moving teams in from Bagram to Gardez for this purpose.

=== Operations against the Haqqani ===
The strike force has been variously designated Task Force 11/Task Force Sword, Task Force 20, Task Force 121, Task Force 145 and Task Force 6-26. Delta Force increased operations in eastern Afghanistan in 2009. "The Navy's SEAL Team 6, sometimes called Naval Special Warfare Development Group, or DEVGRU; the Army's 1st Special Forces Operational Detachment-Delta, or Delta Force; the 75th Ranger Regiment; the 160th Special Operations Aviation Regiment; the Air Force's 24th Special Tactics Squadron; plus elements from other even more secret units and intelligence organizations" has killed or captured more than 2,000 enemy insurgents in Afghanistan against the Haqqani network, which is a strong faction of the Taliban.

=== Further operations in Afghanistan ===
Following the drawdown of troops from Iraq and the surge of troops to Afghanistan in 2008 and 2009, Delta Force returned to conducting operations in Afghanistan. DEVGRU had responsibility for operations in the north and east of Afghanistan, while Delta had the south and west of the country. During the night of 20 July 2011, information provided by a high valued detainee alleged that there was a foreign fighter staging area in southeast Paktika Province that was facilitated by the Haqqani Network.

A squadron supported by Rangers and Afghan SOF elements were inserted by the 160th SOAR into the mountainous region of Sar Rowzah District. They were immediately engaged by insurgents, heavily armed with DShK HMGs and RPGs. During that night's fighting, approximately 30 insurgents were killed. As the sun rose, dozens of remaining insurgents who had been hiding in bunkers and caves became visible. An armed UAV, AH-6s and DAPs flew in close air support, as did ground attack aircraft.

Fighting continued into a second day as bunkers and fighting positions were systematically cleared, some with then-recently issued Mk14 Antistructural Grenades. An estimated 80 to 100 Haqqani and foreign fighters were killed in the two-day battle. A Delta Force Master Sergeant was killed by insurgent small arms fire late in the battle. It was one of Delta's largest operations in the war.

=== Prisoner Exchange for Bowe Bergdahl ===
On 31 May 2014, Army prisoner of war Bowe Bergdahl was handed over to Delta Force operators in exchange for five Guantanamo Bay detainees in Afghanistan. Bergdahl was captured by the Taliban on 30 June 2009.

== Insurgency in Jammu and Kashmir ==
The Daily Telegraph reported that in 2002, a team comprising Special Air Service and Delta Force personnel was sent into the Pakistan occupied Jammu and Kashmir (POJK) to hunt for Osama bin Laden after reports that he was being sheltered by the Pakistani militant group HuM. US officials believed that Al-Qaeda was helping organize a campaign of terror in Kashmir to provoke conflict between India and Pakistan.

== Operation Iraqi Freedom ==
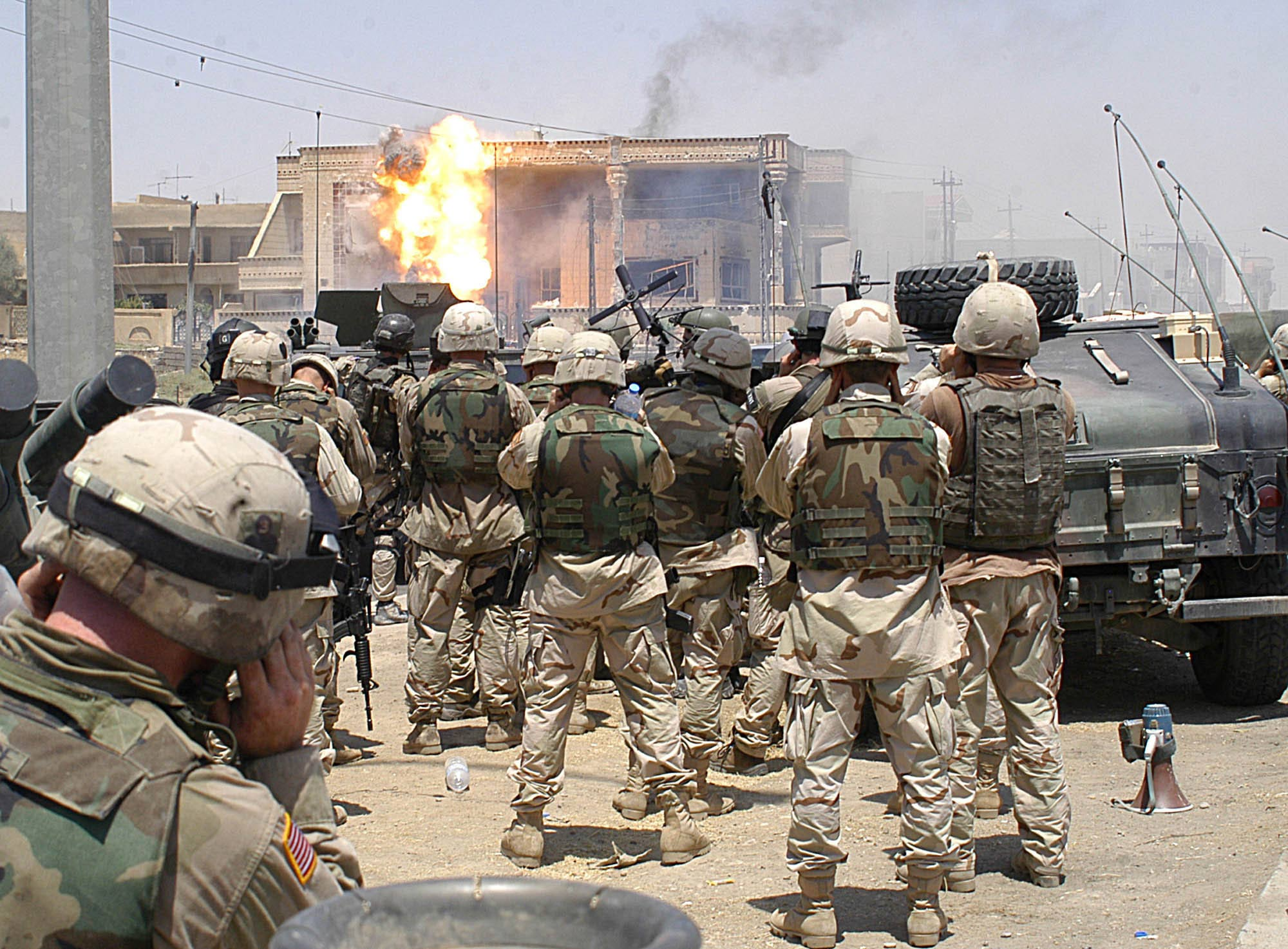
This photo was taken in Mosul during Uday and Qusay's last stand. Delta Force Operators can be seen in front of 1st BDE 101st A/B DIV soldiers wearing MICH TC-2002.

=== Beginning of Delta Force operations in Iraq ===
Delta Force fulfilled several important roles in the 2003 invasion of Iraq. C Squadron (known as "Wolverines"), accompanied by several Air Force Special Tactics teams, a Delta intelligence and targeting cell, several military working dog teams and two American-Iraqi interpreters, was the first US SOF unit to enter western Iraq. The force crossed the border from Ar'ar in 15 customised Pinzgauer 6x6 Special Operations Vehicles and several armed Toyota Hilux pickup trucks. As part of Task Force 20, their formal role was to conduct selected high-priority Site Exploitation on suspected chemical weapon facilities before heading for the Haditha Dam complex. Along the way, Delta supported the seizure of H-3 Air Base and also conducted numerous deception operations to confuse the Iraqis as to the disposition of Coalition forces in the west.

=== Operations around Haditha Dam ===
On 24 March 2003, Delta Force reconnaissance operators drove through Iraqi lines around the Haditha Dam on customized All-terrain vehicles, marking targets for Coalition airstrikes. The subsequent bombings resulted in the destruction of a large number of Iraqi armoured vehicles and antiaircraft systems. Delta's reconnaissance of the dam indicated that a larger force would be needed to seize it, so a request was made and approved for a second Delta squadron from Fort Bragg to be dispatched with a further Ranger battalion, along with M1A1 Abrams tanks from C Company, 2nd Battalion 70th Armor. C-17s flew the company from Talil to H-1 Air Base and then to Mission Support Site Grizzly (MSS Grizzly)– a desert strip established by Delta Force which was located between Haditha and Tikrit; C Squadron, Delta Force was flown directly to MSS Grizzly. On 1 April, C squadron, Delta Force and 3rd Battalion, 75th Ranger Regiment conducted a successful night-time ground assault in their Pinzgauers and GMVs against the Haditha Dam complex. After seizing the dam, they and the Rangers held the dam for five days against Iraqi counterattacks. Delta Force then handed the dam over to the Rangers, and headed north to conduct ambushes along the highway above Tikrit, with the goal of tying up Iraqi forces in the region and attempting to capture fleeing high-value targets trying to escape to Syria.

=== Engagement with Iraqi forces including Fedayeen ===
On 2 April, Delta units were engaged by half a dozen armed technicals from the same anti-special forces Fedayeen that had previously fought the Special Boat Service. Two Delta operators were wounded (one seriously), and the squadron requested an urgent aero medical evacuation and immediate close-air support as a company of truck-borne Iraqi reinforcements arrived to bolster the fedayeen assault. Two MH-60K Blackhawks carrying a para-jumper medical team and two MH-60L DAPs of the 160th SOAR responded and engaged the Iraqis, which allowed the Delta operators to move their casualties to an emergency helicopter landing zone, after which they were medevaced to H-1, escorted by a pair of A-10As. However, Master sergeant George Fernandez died. The DAPs stayed on station and continued to engage the Iraqis, destroying a truck carrying a mortar and several infantry squads, whilst Delta snipers killed Iraqi infantryman firing on the DAPs. A pair of A-10As arrived and dropped 500 lb airburst bombs within 20 m of Delta positions and killed a large number of Iraqi infantry who had been gathering in a wadi. The DAPs spotted several Iraqi units and engaged them until they were dangerously low on fuel. Delta Force operators allegedly entered Baghdad undercover in advance of the coalition forces.

=== Delta Force and SAS stationed in Baghdad ===
After the invasion, along with the British SAS, the Delta Force units were stationed at Mission Support Station Fernandez in Baghdad, and would eventually become part of Task Force Center/Green; the station was named after Master Sergeant George Fernandez.

=== The capture of Abid Hamid al-Tikriti ===
On 16 June 2003, operators from G Squadron, SAS and B squadron, Delta Force, captured Lieutenant-General Abid Hamid Mahmud al-Tikriti, who had been Saddam Hussein's personal secretary and had been ranked the fourth-most-important high value target (HVT) in Tikrit. He was captured in a joint helicopter and ground assault without resistance or casualties, in what was considered a highly successful operation.

=== Intercepting an enemy convoy ===
On 18 June 2003, as part of Task Force 20, Delta Force operators and US Army Rangers flew from Mosul to chase a vehicle convoy of Iraqis who were heading for the Syrian border; JSOC suspected that Saddam Hussein and/or his sons were part of the convoy. The helicopters ran out of time before the convoy fled over the border; however, Secretary of Defense Donald Rumsfeld cleared them to continue the pursuit into Syria. An AC-130 Spectre guided by the TF 20 operators destroyed the convoy with its guns. TF 20 then conducted a heliborne assault into a nearby compound that proved to be a Ba'athist safe house for ferrying former regime elements across the border. TF 20 operators came under fire from Syrian border guards, leading to a firefight that left several Syrians dead and 17 captured. They were immediately released (five of them were wounded and were treated by Delta's medic before repatriation). Ultimately, Hussein was not in the convoy, but several of his cousins were.

=== 2003 Mosul raid ===
On 22 July 2003, a former Ba'athist regime member used an informant to pass intelligence onto the 101st Airborne Division that Uday and Qusay Hussein, along with Qusays' son and a bodyguard, were hiding in the informant's home in Mosul. Several platoons from the 101st Airborne Division set up an outer cordon around the target house, a Delta assault team prepared to breach and clear the building from the entrance, while a Delta interpreter called upon the occupants to surrender. The informant and his two sons left the building as previously agreed. Delta operators breached and entered, upon which they were immediately engaged by a fusillade of small arms fire, which wounded one Delta operator. As they withdrew from the house, the occupants threw grenades from the second floor on the assaulters, and several Delta operators were lightly wounded by the grenade fragments; the stairs had also been blocked to impede any rapid assault. Another group of assaulters fast-roped from an MH-6 Little Bird onto the roof of the building to examine the possibility of entering the building through the roof, but this was not possible. The decision was taken to soften up the target with heavy weapons before another entry. After soldiers of the 101st Airborne engaged the building with .50 cal HMGs and M136 anti-tank weapons, a third entry attempt was made, but was again driven back by intense gunfire. The 101st fired 10 TOW missiles from HMMWV-mounted TOW II antitank guided missiles into the house, followed by repeated gun runs from OH-58 Kiowas firing 2.75 rockets and .50 cal machine guns. Delta subsequently made a successful entry and moved up onto the second floor, finding Qusay and the bodyguard dead. Uday was discovered wounded and armed, and a Delta operator shot and killed him.

=== Joint SAS-Delta Force operation ===
On 31 October 2003, Delta Force assisted A Squadron, SAS, in Operation Abalone: US intelligence had traced a Sudanese jihadist – who was believed to be facilitating the arrival of Islamist terrorists into Iraq – to four compounds/dwellings on the outskirts of Ramadi. Delta Force operators successfully assaulted their two target buildings, while the SAS assaulted the other two dwellings. A group of Delta operators provided night-vision and vehicle-mounted weapon support if needed. After securing the first of their target buildings, the SAS assault stalled when assaulting their final target building and took casualties. A platoon of M2A3 Bradley IFVs subsequently "pummeled" the house with gunfire, and Delta Force units then assaulted the building, killing several terrorists inside, and helping to bring the operation to a successful conclusion. The operation is believed to have killed the Sudanese jihadist, along with a dozen other insurgents. A total of 4 foreign insurgents were captured by the SAS, thereby providing some of the first actual proof to the existence of an internationalist jihadist movement in Iraq.

=== The Capture of Saddam Hussein ===
Intelligence from detained former Ba'ath Party members, supported by signals intelligence by the Intelligence Support Activity, pinpointed the location of Saddam Hussein at a remote farmhouse south of Tikrit. On the evening of 14 December 2003, Operation Red Dawn was launched: troops from 1st BCT, 4th Infantry Division provided an outer cordon while Delta operators from C squadron searched the two locations in the area; however, the initial search found nothing. As the operators finished their search, one of them kicked a piece of flooring to one side, exposing a spider hole. He prepared to throw a fragmentation grenade into it, in case it led to an insurgent tunnel system. However, Hussein suddenly appeared, upon which the Delta operator struck him with the stock of his M4 Carbine and disarmed him of a Glock 18C.

=== Delta Force raid, March 2004 ===
In late March 2004, a Delta Force ground assault force was ambushed as it infiltrated from a target site in Fallujah, with the operators having to use their Pandur armored vehicles for cover against the heavy fire. In the chaos, one of the insurgent detainees escaped. Two Delta troops were wounded. But the Delta Force raiders were finally able to withdraw successfully. In April 2004, Delta was running about 10 operations a month, four months later it had increased to 18.

=== First Battle of Fallujah ===
During the First Battle of Fallujah, Delta Force operators were embedded singly or in pairs within Marine platoons to provide communications, assault, and sniping expertise. In late April 2004, just prior to the total withdrawal from the city, a small Delta Force element was co-located with a Marine platoon manning a pair of houses they were using as an observation post. The Delta operators were there to instruct the Marines on the use of the new antistructural version of the M136 weapon when they were attacked by a large number of insurgents who arrived in the vicinity. Sniper fire led to RPG fire as the insurgents probed the American positions, PKM fire joined the RPGs and the assaults on the two buildings began from an estimated 300 insurgents. As Marines were wounded, Delta medic Staff sergeant Dan Briggs exposed himself to withering small arms fire crossing the street between the two houses on six occasions to treat the wounded Marines. Of 37 men, 25 were wounded and 1 killed. Master sergeant Don Hollenbaugh and Sergeant major Larry Boivin positioned themselves on the rooftop of a three-story building with a pair of Marines and held back the attacks until a grenade landed on the roof, seriously wounding the two Marines and Boivin, who already had fragmentation wounds. The wounded were evacuated off the rooftop, leaving just Hollenbaugh who ran from position to position, alternatively firing his M4 carbine and M136’s and throwing grenades, effectively suppressing and destroying a PKM gunner. The wounded were successfully evacuated; Boivin was awarded the Silver Star, while Hollenbaugh and Briggs were awarded the Distinguished Service Cross.

=== Set up of a Joint Operations Center in Balad Air Base ===
By early 2004, a Joint Operations Center was set up in Balad Air Base where JSOC's war in Iraq would be run by the commander of Delta Force; it was operational by July. Delta Force stayed in Iraq throughout the duration of the war.

=== Successful rescue of four hostages ===
On 8 June 2004, the JSOC Task Force in Iraq conducted its first hostage rescue in Iraq. Four Italian security contractors had been seized in April and soon after one was murdered by his insurgent captors. A Polish contractor was snatched at the start of June. The insurgents passed on a statement that other hostages would be executed unless Italy withdrew its contribution from the Coalition. Intelligence gathered from raids and solid detective work resulted in a daylight raid by operators from Delta Forces' A squadron against an isolated compound near Ramadi, which was codenamed Objective Medford. Four MH-60K Blackhawks carried the assault elements while two MH-60K Blackhawks served as spare and "PC Bird". The "PC Bird" (PC= Precious Cargo) touched down moments after the objective was secured and transported the four hostages to a local Army medical facility. Touching down at 1445 hours local time, one Blackhawk was slightly damaged when its tail struck the target compound's wall. The Delta operators stormed the building, capturing several of the kidnappers, and successfully rescued the four hostages.

=== Second Battle of Fallujah ===
During the Second Battle of Fallujah, Delta Force operators and Green Berets from the 5th Special Forces Group were deployed in small teams (most consisting of just three or four operators) embedded with Marine and Army infantry units. These teams followed the earlier model established during the First Battle of Fallujah, providing advanced communications, sniping and assault experience, as well as mentoring the soldiers and Marines fighting house to house through the city.

=== Operation Snake Eyes ===
In 2005, Delta Force operators and operators from Naval Special Warfare Development Group and other regular Army and Marine forces, conducted Operation Snake Eyes. This operation was aimed at taking down local militant networks, especially those associated with Al-Qaeda in Iraq (AQI). This mission focused on eliminating the network from top to bottom, with particular emphasis on targeting the "middlemen" throughout Iraq. In May 2005, Delta Force operators deployed into Task Force Blue's zone in the Euphrates valley and soon became engaged in a series of close-range battles with Sunni militants. The insurgents were large in number and fought with sophistication and intensity. On 31 May, Sergeant first class Steven M. Langmack was killed during a mission near the Syrian border, becoming the first Delta fatality since 2003. On 17 June, Delta Force operators, with support of US Marine battalions, stormed a house in Al-Qaim, near where Langmack was killed. This assault targeted a number of "bottom of the chain" Al-Qaeda insurgents. The insurgents had a bunker inside the building, setting a trap for the assaulters. As a result, Delta Master Sergeants Michael L. McNulty and Robert M. Horrigan were killed. The Delta team withdrew from the house and a JDAM was dropped on the house. Due to the mounting number of killed and wounded in the squadron (Delta squadrons only number around 60 to 70 operators), General Stanley McChrystal asked the then-Director Special Forces for assistance. However the request was denied due to the treatment of detainees and the conditions of the JSOC detention facility at Balad, and other operational issues such as rules of engagement. Therefore, a second Delta Force squadron was flown in and Delta pressed on with its operations. On 25 August, three Delta Force operators (MSG Ivica Jerak, SFC Obediah J. Kolath, and SFC Trevor Diesing) and 1 US Army Ranger were killed when an anti-tank mine destroyed their Pandur armored vehicle near Husaybah; At least three operators from SEAL Team 6 who were deployed to Afghanistan at the time were seconded to Delta after they requested additional assaulters.

=== Ambushing and eliminating a terrorist ===
In summer 2005, a Delta Force team used a small civilian van to get close to their target, the van was decorated in typical fashion to blend into the Iraqi neighborhood. A special covering in the rear of the windows made the vehicle appear full of blankets, when in fact it was driven by Delta operators disguised as locals with more Delta operators concealed in the back. Hiding in plain sight, the Delta operators drove through the Mosul traffic with their target in view. They pulled their vehicle right next to the vehicle the terrorist was riding in. The Delta operatives slid their door back and killed the terrorist. After shooting the terrorist and someone who was with him, the Delta operators grabbed the bodies and brought them back to their base.

=== Rescue of Roy Hallums ===
On 7 September 2005, after intelligence was obtained from a detainee interrogation, a Delta Force assault team landed in MH-6 Little Bird helicopters at an isolated farmhouse outside Baghdad and searched the building. The assaulters discovered a trap door to a basement cell where Roy Hallums, an American contractor, and another hostage were being held were found and rescued. During the Basra prison incident, the then-commander of Delta Force offered British commanders the services of Delta Force's C squadron, but the situation was eventually resolved by the British forces. Delta Force squadrons' tours of duty in Iraq lasted 90 days.

=== Raid near Yusufiyah ===
In early 2006, Delta Force took part in a raid called Operation Dahin. In cooperation with regular and other special operations units, the aim was to take down AQI leadership. On 14 May 2006, B squadron Delta Force, including a SAS liaison officer, conducted a mission near Yusufiyah against Al-Qaeda fighters in several buildings/dwellings. As the Delta Force operators disembarked from their helicopters, they came under fire from a nearby house. The situation rapidly escalated into a full-blown battle, and as more Al-Qaeda fighters joined the firefight, the operators came under intense fire from small arms and mortars. Three Al-Qaeda fighters, including one suicide bomber, attempted to mount an attack via a truck but were killed under a hail of fire. Door gunners from the helicopters that had inserted the operators engaged the insurgents whilst AH-6 Little Birds made strafing runs against the insurgents. One AH-6 was shot down, killing the two crewmen. Despite the ferocity of the battle, the operators reached their targets and captured 4 insurgents and gave medical treatment for three injured women; during a lull in the fighting, a CASEVAC helicopter was brought in to remove the locals but it came under fire, causing the Americans to call in airstrikes on several targets around the landing zone. In the course of the mission, 3 other helicopters were forced to land due to damage from ground fire. Total casualties amounted to two killed and five wounded Americans whilst more than 25 terrorists were killed and 4 captured. When Darkness came, the Delta Force raiders extracted from the area. The B squadron commander was relieved of his command, reportedly because the daylight raid was deemed to be an unnecessary risk. By 2006, Delta was running about 300 raids a month and casualties mounted, with Delta squadrons often reduced to 30 or fewer operators in the squadrons’ 4-month rotations to Iraq.

=== The Death of Zarqawi ===
In April 2006, in raids conducted by B squadron SAS and B squadron Delta Force on Al-Qaeda in Iraq targets in areas dubbed "Baghdad Belts", intelligence was gathered that led to coalition forces carrying out Operation Larchwood 4, the operation which led to the death of Abu Musab al-Zarqawi. Zarqawi was tracked to a farmhouse in the village Hibhib northeast of Baquba on 7 June 2006, A squadron Delta Force in Baghdad prepared to attack Zarqawi's safe house but one MH-6 Little Bird engines lost power and would not restart, so JSOC called in an airstrike by an F-16C that wounded Zarqawi. US forces nearby found Zarqawi alive but severely wounded. Soon after, the first Delta team landed by Little Birds to confront Iraqi police, who were putting the still living Zarqawi into a waiting ambulance, claiming not to know who he was. The Delta operators disarmed them and Zarqawi succumbed to his wounds, despite assistance of a Delta medic. Operation Larchwood 4 was part of an intense series of operations in the Triangle of Death, most of which were carried out by Delta Force and other US forces.

=== Raid during the second battle of Ramadi ===
During the Second Battle of Ramadi Delta Force operators from Task Force Green and DEVGRU operators from Task Force Blue mounted takedown operations against Al-Qaeda targets based on high-level intelligence. In November 2006, an AH-6M Little Bird was brought down by an RPG striking its tail rotor whilst escorting a 20-man Delta assault helicopter force in 2 MH-6s and 2 MH-60Ls on their way to a time-sensitive daylight raid to target a foreign fighter facilitator, and both crewmen were injured. The Delta operators landed and set up a cordon, and the injured crewmen were evacuated by an MH-60L. While the soldiers waited for a Downed Aircraft Recovery Team (DART), 6 technicals, each armed with ZPU-2, were identified a kilometer away closing in on the crash site. As they began engaging the ground force, another AH-6M immediately attacked the technicals; however, 20 insurgents in nearby houses fired small arms and RPGs at the Little Bird so the AH-6 was forced to begin suppressing them. A Quick Reaction Force (QRF) from TF 20 was launched, and until they got there the AH-6 conducted repeated "gun runs" on the technicals and insurgents. Breaking contact and landing several times to rearm, the Little Bird pilots kept the insurgents at bay until the QRF arrived. Two other AH-6Ms joined the Little Bird and engaged the remaining technicals before the insurgents broke contact and retreated. One of the 2 fleeing technicals was destroyed by F-16C's. As one F-16C flew in to destroy the last technical, it came in too low and crashed, killing the pilot.

=== Operations against Iran ===
Also in November 2006, U.S. President George W. Bush sanctioned a new directive to allow US forces in Iraq to capture Iranian nationals if they engaged in targeting coalition forces, and efforts to do so were undertaken. These missions were known by the acronym CII (Counter Iranian Influence). Delta Force became part of Task Force 16, whose main aim was originally to carry out CII missions, but was later refocused to Al-Qaeda; the CII missions were subsequently given to Task Force 17. Since at least 2004, there had been growing human intelligence about the training of Iraqi insurgents in Iran as well as financial backing and even the supplying of weaponry to Shia insurgents, as well as members of the Army of the Guardians of the Islamic Revolution and other Iranian special forces. On 11 January 2007, following human intelligence received by the CIA at its Kurdish station, Delta Force operatives raided the Iranian Liaison Office (effectively Iran's embassy in the region) in Irbil. They were inserted onto the roof by Black Hawk and Little Bird helicopters, whilst a simultaneous ground assault took place. They failed to find the two senior Iranian agents they were looking for, but they arrested 5 staff members who were tested positive for handling explosives. The Delta team quickly moved to Irbil airport in case the two targets were trying to escape by plane, but after a standoff between American and Kurdish forces, the Delta Force team withdrew. Analysis of papers and phones from the Irbil raid and an earlier CII raid revealed that the Iranians were assisting a much wider range of insurgent groups than previously believed, including Ansar al-Sunna. Delta captured five Iranians from the Quds Force in Irbil, thereby establishing their connection to the insurgency. Delta Force operators also killed the alleged mastermind of the Karbala provincial headquarters in a raid in Sadr City when the target attempted to grab one of the operators' HK416.

=== Abu Kamal Raid, October 2008 ===
In October 2008, Delta Force operators took part in the Abu Kamal raid.

=== Delta Force Casualties ===
Delta Force sustained casualties are unknown.

== Operation Juniper Shield ==
Special operations carried out in North Africa are under the codename Operation Juniper Shield.

=== Benghazi Evacuation ===
During the 2012 Benghazi attack, two Delta Force operators along with five CIA personnel accompanied Glen Doherty to aid the besieged Benghazi Embassy compound, after commandeering a small jet in Tripoli by paying the pilots $30,000 and forcing them to fly the team to Benghazi. After fierce fighting, the rescue team including the two Delta operators assisted in evacuating the surviving diplomatic staff to the main Embassy in Tripoli.

For their courage and bravery, one of the Delta operators, Master Sergeant David R. Halbruner, was awarded the Distinguished Service Cross. Marine Gunnery Sergeant Tate Jolly, who had passed Delta selection, was awarded the Navy Cross. While confusion was still reigning and with the possibility that the US ambassador had been seized by militants, a Delta squadron was forward deployed from Afghanistan to conduct a possible rescue. Ultimately it was not required. At the time of the attack, small teams from CIA SAD and JSOC were both conducting operations in Libya – most probably advance work on the later 'snatch' missions conducted by Delta Force.

=== The arrest of Abu Anas al-Liby ===
On 5 October 2013, Abu Anas al-Liby was arrested in Tripoli, Libya. In the early hours whilst driving home from morning prayer, a van pulled up alongside his car, while another car pulled in ahead-blocking any escape. Delta operators in civilian clothing then disembarked their vehicles, disarmed, cuffed and hooded al-Liby, and drove him to an undisclosed Libyan military base, where they were flown to a US Navy warship in the Mediterranean sea. The operation was conducted by Delta with the assistance of FBI agents, operators from the CIA's Special Activities Division, and possibly Intelligence Support Activity SIGINT teams. He was arrested and removed from Libya.

=== The raid to capture Ahmed Abu Khattala ===
On the weekend of 14–15 June 2014, Ahmed Abu Khattala was captured by Delta Force, accompanied by FBI HRT agents, when they tricked their way into the compound that Khattala was in and subdued him. Khattala was flown to a US Navy warship and eventually into FBI custody. The Delta Force team was most likely accompanied by a small contingent of elite Intelligence Support Activity operators, who tracked Ahmed Abu Khattala, by SIGINT and HUMINT capability on a consistent basis.

== Operation Inherent Resolve ==
=== Preparing operations in Inherent Resolve ===
Delta Force operators took part in Operation Inherent Resolve, part of the U.S.-led Military intervention against ISIL. They carried out operations to target, capture or kill top ISIS operatives in Iraq, reportedly beginning in late February 2016, after several weeks of covert preparation such as setting up safe houses, establishing informant networks and coordinating operations with Iraqi and Peshmerga units.

The Delta Force operators were part of an Expeditionary Targeting Force numbering around 200 personnel, their main objectives are to gather enough intelligence from raids on terrorist-occupied compounds and hideouts, then from intelligence gathered at those sites they will give the ETF more intelligence about ISIS networks and quickly attack additional and related targets, in what is known as "targeted" missions. This strategy was tested during the May 2015 raid on Deir Ezzor, the ETF has so far collected enough intelligence about ISIS operations in Iraq in up to half a dozen locations that raids and field operations are ready to take place in Iraq.

=== The capture of an ISIS chemical weapons expert ===
Delta also carried out an operation in February 2016 to capture an ISIS chemical weapons expert. The operation was a success as vital intelligence was gathered following interrogation of the individual.

=== Attempted Rescue of Hostages ===
On 4 July 2014, two dozen Delta Force operators, along with SIGINT and assault elements from the Intelligence Support Activity, were inserted via 160th SOAR into northern Syria, in an attempt to find captured journalist James Foley and other American hostages. According to witnesses, after destroying anti-aircraft weapons the Delta and ISA ground elements all consolidated, with ISA being the most valued SIGINT/HUMINT team members, and Delta operators assaulted an ISIS base. The base was destroyed and all ISIS fighters killed at the cost of one American wounded during the insertion. There were no hostages present. The above account and other details of the raid have emerged from witnesses who spoke with a member of a Syrian opposition activist group, who identified himself as Abu Ibrahim al Raqaoui. Raqaoui told the information to Reuters in an interview via Skype from inside Syria. His group also posted witness accounts of the raid on Facebook soon after it took place. The posts, which were viewed by Reuters, have since been taken down. James Foley would later be executed on video and the operation revealed by the Pentagon. SIDENOTE: Roughly a quasi-above average number of Delta operations followed the failed Foley attempt. With their brethren in DEVGRU/SEAL Team 6, and the shadowy ISA/NSA and likely from ground task units used before in previous operations, Delta commanders (entire Squadron-sized assault elements were even considered, it has been rumored) grabbed and consolidated the remaining Delta in the AOR and then hastily put some small Task Forces out on the ground in almost all the most difficult to traverse areas inside Syria. In order to try and catch a track from the SSE of other "dry holes" that may not have yielded much, the primary focus, had to take a back seat, gratefully, to the very least, more than a hundred ISIS fighters, as well as IRGC-influenced proxies in various ACMs (Anti-Coalition Militias) were taken off the battlefield permanently. From everything from targeted strikes by Delta to armed ISR and AC-130s, the CENTCOM SOF made short work of the visible ISIL positions (but only the ones they were cleared to hit, said anonymous insiders who believed and still do, that ISIS could have been nearly 70% wiped out in their part of that battlespace) and still are from their bases in nearby countries like Jordan who are not sending their Special Operations in to not be heavy-handed. The Jordanian assistance in the intervention has been crucial, as likely their GID is the best in the entire region.

=== The death of Abu Sayyaf ===
On the night of 15 May 2015, U.S. special operations forces launched a raid on Deir Ezzor in eastern Syria. The objective of the raid was to capture the head of financial operations of ISIL, Abu Sayyaf. He was geolocated using SIGINT (Signals Intelligence), as well as HUMINT (Human Intelligence) via assets from another JSOC Task Force conducting nearby low-visibility operations, while also utilizing the intelligence from covert assets inside local militias allied to ISIS.

Sayyaf was killed after his on-site security personnel engaged in a firefight with U.S assault elements converging on the location from the landing zone, while the V-22 Ospreys and other aircraft stood by. In total, 13 were killed in action including Sayyaf. The raid captured Sayyaf's wife, Umm Sayyaf, and records of ISIS operations.

=== Delta Force and Peshmerga joint raid in freeing prisoners ===
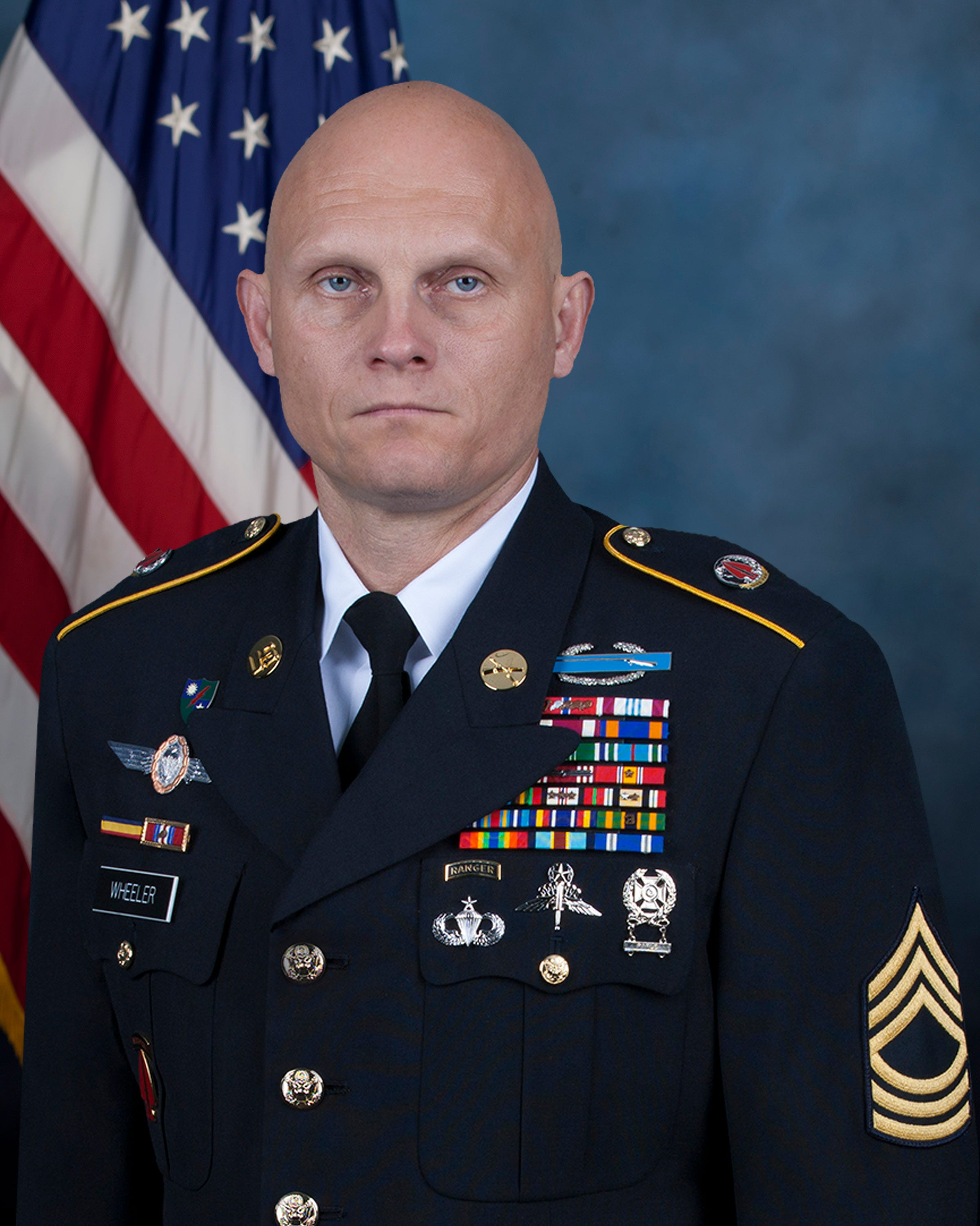
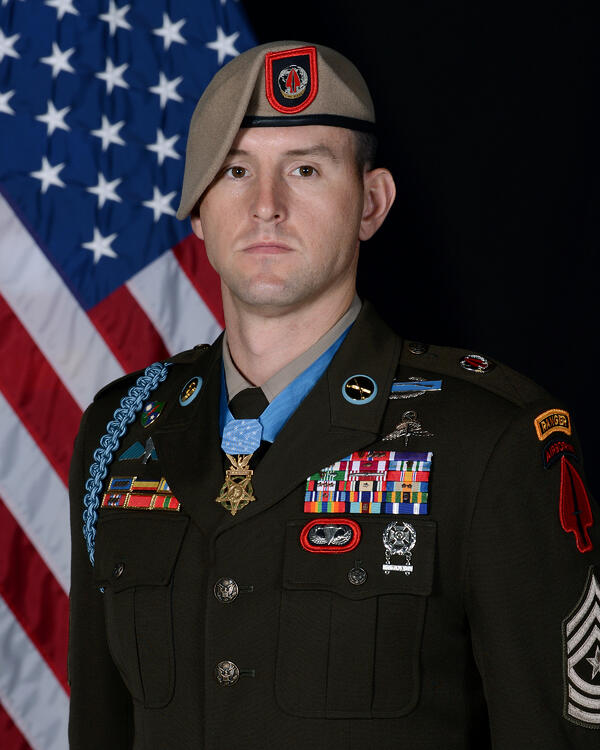
MSG Joshua Wheeler (left), was the first American service member killed in Action in Iraq since 2011. SGM Thomas Payne (right), Then a SFC, was awarded the Medal of Honor for his actions that day.

A joint predawn raid conducted on 22 October 2015 by a team of Kurdish Counter-terrorism Unit peshmerga forces and U.S. special operations forces on an ISIL run prison near Hawija in Iraq's Kirkuk Governorate freed approximately 70 hostages, including more than 20 members of the Iraqi security forces. One U.S. Delta Force soldier, MSG Joshua Wheeler, was fatally wounded – the first American combat death since the start of the US-led intervention against ISIL. Four Iraqi units were wounded. SGM Thomas Payne, then a SFC was awarded the Medal of Honor by Donald Trump on 11 September 2020, for his actions that day.

=== Raid in Eastern province of Deir Ezzor ===
On 8 January 2017, US special operations forces reportedly from Delta carried out a raid in Syria against leaders of the ISIS group in the eastern province of Deir Ezzor. Delta inserted via helicopter and spent roughly 90 minutes on the ground near Deir al-Zour – about 80 miles from ISIL's so-called capital in Raqqa – before witnesses say they left carrying captured ISIS fighters and bodies. The Syrian Observatory for Human Rights said at least 25 ISIS fighters were killed during the raid, though that number has not been confirmed.

== Operation Black Swan ==
U.S. officials announced that members of Delta Force were involved in the 8 January 2016 mission that resulted in the capture of Sinaloa Cartel leader "El Chapo" Guzmán, after a firefight in Los Mochis, Sinaloa, Mexico.

== Operation Kayla Mueller ==
On 26–27 October 2019 U.S. Joint Special Operations Command's (JSOC) Delta Force conducted a raid into the Idlib province of Syria on the border with Turkey that resulted in the death of Ibrahim Awad Ibrahim Ali al-Badri al-Samarrai also known as Abu Bakr al-Baghdadi. The raid was launched based on a CIA Special Activities Center intelligence collection and close target reconnaissance effort that located the leader of ISIS. Launched after midnight local time, the eight helicopters carrying the teams along with support aircraft crossed hundreds of miles of airspace controlled by Iraq, Turkey and Russia. Upon arrival, efforts were made to get Baghdadi to surrender. When those efforts were unsuccessful U.S. forces responded by blowing a large hole in the side of the compound. After entering, the compound was cleared, with people either surrendering or being shot and killed. The two hour raid culminated with Baghdadi fleeing from U.S. forces into a dead-end tunnel and detonating a suicide vest, killing himself along with two of his children. When Baghdadi detonated his vest, two Delta operators and one military working dog (Conan) were injured in the blast but sustained no life-threatening injuries. The operation was conducted during the withdrawal of U.S. forces northeast Syria, adding to its complexity.

== Killing of ISIS Leader al-Qurayshi ==
On 3 February 2022, the leader of the Islamic State terrorist group, Abu Ibrahim al-Hashimi al-Qurayshi, whose real name was Amir Muhammad Said Abdel-Rahman al-Mawla, detonated a bomb when two dozen members of Delta Force surrounded his home in Atmeh, Syria, killing himself and 13 others living in the home. The two dozen operators were inserted via helicopter, and supported by Apache attack helicopters, MQ-9 Reaper drones, and attack jets. Al-Qurayshi replaced Abu Bakr al-Baghdadi as the leader of ISIS, following al-Baghdadi's suicide death when cornered by operators from Delta Force not far from the site of al-Qurayshi's death.

== Operation Absolute Resolve ==
On 3 January 2026, Delta operators captured Venezuelan President Nicolás Maduro and his wife Cilia Flores during the 2026 United States airstrikes in Venezuela.

== 2026 United States F-15E rescue operation in Iran ==
On 3 April through 5th, 2026, operators from the 1st Special Forces Operational Detachment-Delta were deployed along with United States Air Force pararescuemen and DEVGRU to rescue the two members of the F-15E Strike Eagle that was shot down in Iranian airspace.

== See also ==
- List of operations conducted by SEAL Team Six
- Task Force 6-26
- Joint Special Operations Command Task Force in the Iraq War
- Task Force 121
- Operation Neptune Spear
