= Joshua Wheeler =

United States Army soldier (1975–2015)

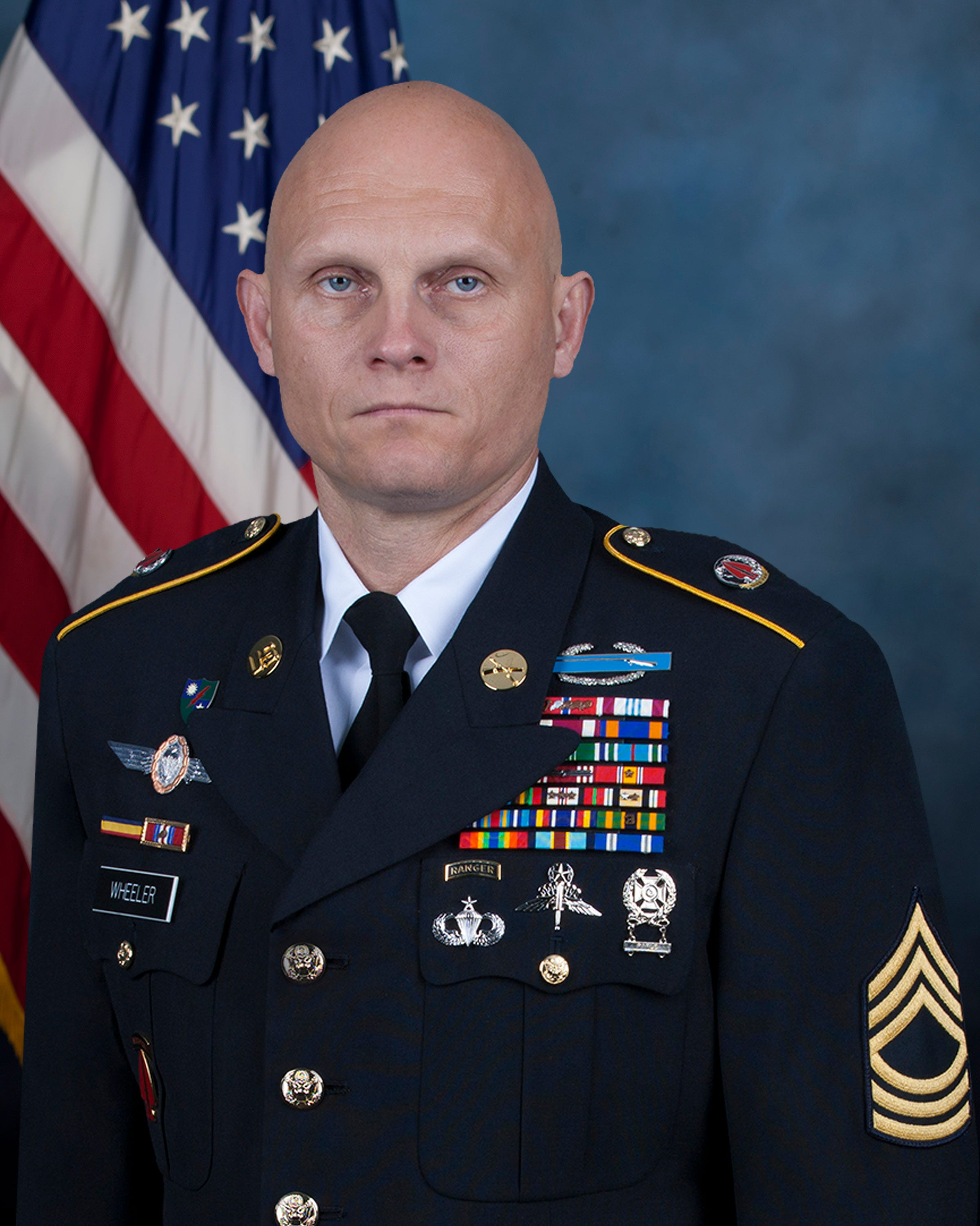
- Born: November 22, 1975; Roland, Oklahoma, United States
- Died: October 22, 2015 (aged 39); Kirkuk Province, Iraq
- Burial place: Arlington National Cemetery
- Military career
- Allegiance: United States
- Branch: United States Army
- Service years: 1995–2015
- Rank: Master Sergeant
- Units: Company C, 1st Battalion, 24th Infantry Regiment; B Company, 2nd Ranger Battalion, 75th Ranger Regiment; Delta Force
- Conflicts: War in Afghanistan; Iraq War; Operation Inherent Resolve †
- Awards: Silver Star; Bronze Star (11); Purple Heart

Joshua Lloyd Wheeler (November 22, 1975 – October 22, 2015) was a United States Army soldier who was killed in Iraq during Operation Inherent Resolve. He was a master sergeant assigned to the elite Delta Force, and was the first American service member killed in action as a result of enemy fire while fighting ISIS militants. He was also the first American to be killed in action in Iraq since November 2011.

Wheeler was a highly decorated service member, having earned 11 Bronze Star Medals including four with Valor Devices. He was posthumously awarded the Silver Star, the Purple Heart and the Medal of Patriotism.

== Early life and education ==
Wheeler was born in Roland, Oklahoma. He graduated from Muldrow High School in Muldrow, Oklahoma in 1994. He was a citizen of the Cherokee Nation.

== Military career ==
Wheeler enlisted in the United States Army in May 1995 as an infantryman and completed basic training at Fort Benning, Georgia. He was then stationed at Fort Lewis, Washington and assigned to Company C, 1st Battalion, 24th Infantry Regiment until 1997 when he was assigned to Company B, 2nd Battalion, 75th Ranger Regiment. Wheeler deployed three times in support of combat operations to Afghanistan and Iraq with the 75th Ranger Regiment. In 2004 Wheeler was stationed at Fort Bragg, North Carolina and was assigned to the United States Army Special Operations Command's Delta Force in which he was a team leader deploying 11 times to Afghanistan and Iraq in support of combat operations.

== Death ==
Wheeler was killed in the predawn hours of 22 October 2015 during Operation Inherent Resolve as a result of enemy small-arms fire sustained during a raid on an ISIS prison compound 7 kilometres (4.3 mi) North of the town of Hawija in Iraq's Kirkuk province. He was one of around 30 U.S. special operations soldiers who fought alongside Kurdish Counter-terrorism unit Peshmerga forces. The operation secured the release of approximately 70 hostages, including more than 20 members of the Iraqi Security Forces, being held in the compound. Wheeler was directing the Kurdish attack on the prison and joined the fighting when those who had breached the compound came under fire inside. Reports stated that Wheeler ran toward the sound of the gunfire and that his actions along with those of one of his teammates ensured the success of the operation and protected those Kurdish fighters who had breached the compound. The Kurdistan Regional Government asked U.S. special operations forces to support an operation to free hostages that were being held inside the prison and were going to be executed. Information had been obtained which stated the hostages faced imminent execution and it was confirmed that graves had already been prepared for the hostages outside of the compound. The Kurdish government stated after the raid that none of the 15 Kurdish fighters who were the object of the operation were found and that none of the hostages freed were Kurdish. Four Kurdish peshmerga soldiers were wounded during the operation. Five ISIS militants were detained during the operation and approximately 20 were killed. On 11 September 2020, one of his teammates, then-SFC Thomas Payne, was awarded the Medal of Honor for his actions that day, becoming the first living Delta Force recipient of the Medal of Honor and the first Medal of Honor recipient for Operation Inherent Resolve.

== Personal life ==
Wheeler lived in North Carolina with his four sons and wife, Ashley, who had given birth in August 2015 to his fourth son. His three older sons were from a previous marriage. Wheeler was a citizen of the Cherokee Nation and was posthumously awarded the Medal of Patriotism by the Cherokee Nation in July 2016.

== Awards and decorations ==
At the time of his death Wheeler had been awarded the following awards and decorations, except for the Silver Star, the Purple Heart and the Medal of Patriotism, which were awarded posthumously.

Personal decorations
Silver Star
Bronze Star Medal with Valor Device and two silver oak leaf clusters
Purple Heart
Defense Meritorious Service Medal
Meritorious Service Medal
Air Medal
Joint Service Commendation Medal with Valor Device and oak leaf cluster
Army Commendation Medal with six oak leaf clusters
Joint Service Achievement Medal
Army Achievement Medal with seven oak leaf clusters
Cherokee National Medal of Patriotism
Army Good Conduct Medal (6 awards)
National Defense Service Medal with one bronze service star
Armed Forces Expeditionary Medal (device(s) unknown)
Afghanistan Campaign Medal with three campaign stars
Iraq Campaign Medal with six campaign stars
Inherent Resolve Campaign Medal with two campaign stars
Global War on Terrorism Expeditionary Medal with two service stars
Global War on Terrorism Service Medal
NCO Professional Development Ribbon with bronze award numeral 4
Army Service Ribbon
Army Overseas Service Ribbon with award numeral 4
NATO Medal for service with ISAF
Unit awards
Navy Presidential Unit Citation
Valorous Unit Award with oak leaf cluster

Other accoutrements
Combat Infantryman Badge
Expert Infantryman Badge
Senior Parachutist Badge
Military Free Fall Jumpmaster Badge
Gold German Parachutist Badge
75th Ranger Regiment Distinctive Unit Insignia
Ranger tab
USASOC CSIB
Expert Marksmanship Badge with Rifle Component Bar
9 Overseas Service Bars
6 Service stripes

== See also ==
- Abu Sayyaf (Islamic State leader)
- List of operations conducted by Delta Force
- US-led intervention in Iraq (2014–2021)
