= Doppelgangster =

- Type: Theatre group
- Purpose: contemporary, site specific, political
- Location(s): Australia & United Kingdom
- Artistic director(s): Dr Tom Payne & Tobias Manderson-Galvin

Doppelgangster (often written with an umlaut; or stylised with the signature 'Three Dot' umlaut) is a UK/Australian experimental performance company that has been recognised internationally for its ecologically and socially engaged practice, which includes site-specific theatre, one-to-one encounters, and subversive political interventions. The company has been recognised by the International Network for Contemporary Performing Arts (IETM) and the French Coalition for Art and Sustainable Development (COAL) for "creating cultural responses to climate change, forced migration and globalisation using technology to extend their reach to new audiences".

== Background ==
Doppelgangster formed in July 2015 with support from National Theatre Wales, under the joint creative direction of Tobias Manderson-Galvin and Wales based ecological raconteur Dr. Tom Payne. The company's flagship performance Doppelgangster's TITANIC featured in Paris in December 2015 as part of a multi-strand programme of work created in response to the United Nations Framework Convention on Climate Change (COP21).

== Productions ==
=== All Productions ===
2018
- Everybody Loses (Apparat Athen, Athens)
- Everybody Loses (KingsXTheatre, Sydney)
- Everybody Loses (MKA Pop-Up, Melbourne)
- Everybody Loses (Backbone Arts, East Brisbane Bowls Club, Brisbane)
- Everybody Loses (The Projector, Singapore)
- Everybody Loses (Alacala de Henares, Madrid)
- Everybody Loses (Tom Thumb Theatre, Margate)
- Treef***ers (Performance Lab, Sheffield)

2017

- Puntila/Matti (KingsXTheatre, Sydney)
- The Eternity of the World (Provocaré Festival of the Arts, Anna Pappas Gallery, Melbourne)
- The Eternity of the World (Bondi Feast, Bondi Pavilion, Sydney)
- Everybody Loses (Aberystwyth Arts Centre)
- Marie Roget (Off the Shelf Festival, Sheffield)
- A Death Sentence (KingsXTheatre, Sydney)

2016

- Doppelgangster's TITANIC (HotHotHot Festival, SiteWorks, Melbourne)
- Doppelgangster's TITANIC (Site2/Safle 2 Festival, Aberystwyth Arts Centre)
- Hot!Hot!Hot! Climate Arts Festival (SiteWorks, Melbourne)
- Baby (Vault Festival, London)

2015

- Doppelgangster's TITANIC Experimentica
- COPpelgangster21 Season of Works
- Doppelgangster (DEAD) (Online Video Series)
- The Eleventh Hour (Aberystwyth)
- Oxygen Support (COPSolutions Expo, Paris)
- Doppelgangster are Unforgettable (ArtsHouse, Melbourne)

=== Doppelgangster's TITANIC ===
Doppegangster's TITANIC is a satirical re-working of James Cameron's 1997 Hollywood blockbuster Titanic. The performance was originally conceived at a National Theatre Wales retreat in mid Wales. A developmental version was premiered at Experimentica15 at the Chapter Arts Centre in Cardiff in November 2015. The performance takes place in or and around a 20-foot shipping container and has since been staged in Wales, Paris and Melbourne. The first performance received a single one star review which described it as 'totally disrespectful to the victims of the disaster'. At a showing in Aberystwyth the performance was controversially cancelled for being 'deemed too dangerous to perform'. In Melbourne Australia the performance received critical acclaim in the Australian media which described it as a 'restless, utterly original indie performance' and 'Filled with cheeky academic dissection, hilarious moments of anti-theatre and astute commentary on climate change and migration, this show is active, present, high energy, funny and politically on point'.

=== COPpelgangster21 ===
One of the company's first projects involved a multi-strand programme of work for ArtCOP21, a global festival of cultural activity on climate change that ran parallel to COP21 in Paris in December 2015. This work was created in partnership with the Climate Change Commission for Wales, Mapme.com and festival co-organisers Cape Farewell, who describe the company's project as "provocative". COPpelgangster21 included Doppelgangster's TITANIC, The Oxygen Travelling Sales Team, The Eleventh Hour, DEAD, and COPout. This work took place shortly after the November 2015 terrorist attacks which led to the imposition of a national state of emergency. Reflecting upon Doppelgangster's project, Australian arts critic Ben Neutze highlights the challenges that the company faced when "making art during the Paris Climate Conference, in the midst of a heightened security state, just weeks after the November 13 terrorist attacks in the city".

==== Doppelgangster's TITANIC ====
This staging of the performance was originally intended to take place in an outdoor location on the banks of the River Seine, but following the November 2015 terrorist attacks and the subsequent imposition of a national state of emergency in France, which prevented outdoor public gatherings, the performance was relocated inside La Generale, a former power substation and one time Nazi boot factory in the 11th Arrondissement. Reflecting upon Doppelgangster's TITANIC with reference to the theme of global warming, American academic and activist Judee Burr explains that 'Titanic poses the central question for us: are we all on a sinking ship, H.M.S. Mother Earth? Right now, we in the United States are in first class, with full access to the lifeboats. Third class is already filling up with water, and we’re enjoying the orchestra, still left with time to deny that our boat is really in trouble'.

==== Doppelgangster (DEAD) ====
Doppelgangster (DEAD) was an online video series which was broadcast daily throughout COP21. It connected events taking place in the city with international audiences on Twitter and Facebook.

==== The Eleventh Hour ====
The Eleventh Hour was a chat show performance that took place at Ty'n yr Helyg Barn in mid Wales in November 2015 in the weeks leading up to COP21.

==== Oxygen Support ====
The Oxygen Travelling Sales Team was singled out as one of "21 Unmissable Environmental Arts Events at COP21". Ironically the performance in its intended form never took place, due to the limitations on outdoor gatherings. It was adapted instead in partnership with Art For Change 21, where it became the radical protest performance Oxygen Support. This controversial performance took place in the Grand Palais at the closing of the COP21 Solutions Exposition, which featured exhibits from Engie, Renault Nissan and Coca-Cola.

=== Baby ===
Baby was a co-production with MKA: Theatre of New Writing and it premiered at Vault Festival beneath Waterloo Station in January 2016. It tells the true story of a Russian pilot who crash landed on an iceberg and encountered a polar bear. The performance was described by critics as a 'supreme WTF of a show', and 'a seventy-five minute joke no one except the performers are in on' and Manderson-Galvin and Payne were accused of 'purposely confusing the audience, dissecting the conventions of theatre and then beating some life back into it'. Other critics drew greater significance from the work, describing it as 'a show with many layers, with hints to the current migration situation in Syria, and the extremes people are being forced to endure to survive'.

== Reception ==
Cameron Woodhead, writing in The Age (Australia), called Doppelgangster "theatrical saboteurs". Ben Neutze, writing in the Daily Review (Australia), called them "Wildly experimental and wildly entertaining". Former Sydney Morning Herald reviewer Jason Blake, considered their work "a chaotically funny exploration of capitalist and theatrical value systems.". IETM & COAL said of the group in their 'Fresh Perspectives 4: Art for the Planet's Sake' that "Doppelgangster are creating cultural responses to climate change, forced migration and globalisation."
