= Thomas Payne (soldier) =

US Army soldier and Medal of Honor recipient (born 1984)

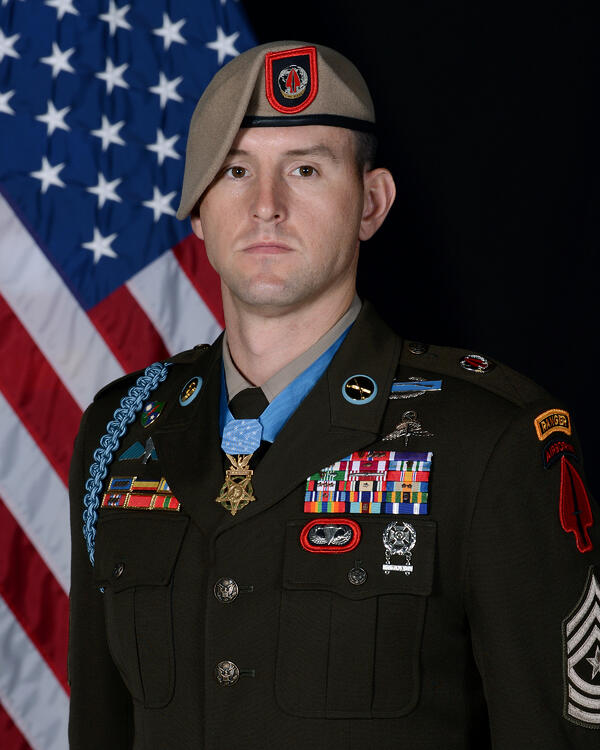
- Official portrait, 2020
- Born: April 2, 1984 (age 42); South Carolina, U.S.
- Alma mater: Norwich University (BS)
- Spouse: Alison Payne (m. 2011)
- Children: 3
- Military career
- Allegiance: United States
- Branch: United States Army
- Service years: 2002–Present
- Rank: Sergeant Major
- Units: 1st Special Forces Operational Detachment – Delta (Delta Force); 1st Battalion, 75th Ranger Regiment
- Conflicts: War in Afghanistan; Iraq War; Operation Inherent Resolve
- Awards: Medal of Honor; Bronze Star Medal (4); Purple Heart

Thomas Patrick Payne (born April 2, 1984) is a retired American soldier. For actions as a sergeant first class in the United States Army's elite Delta Force, he was awarded the Medal of Honor for actions during a 2015 hostage rescue mission in an area of northern Iraq controlled by the Islamic State. Payne previously served in the 75th Ranger Regiment, and as an infantry instructor. He is the first living Delta Force Medal of Honor recipient, and only individual to receive the award for actions during Operation Inherent Resolve.

== Early life and education ==
Payne was born on April 2, 1984, and grew up in Batesburg-Leesville and Lugoff, South Carolina, graduating from Lugoff-Elgin High School in 2002. His father is a policeman, and he has two brothers, one of whom also serves in the United States Army and the other in the United States Air Force.

== Army career ==
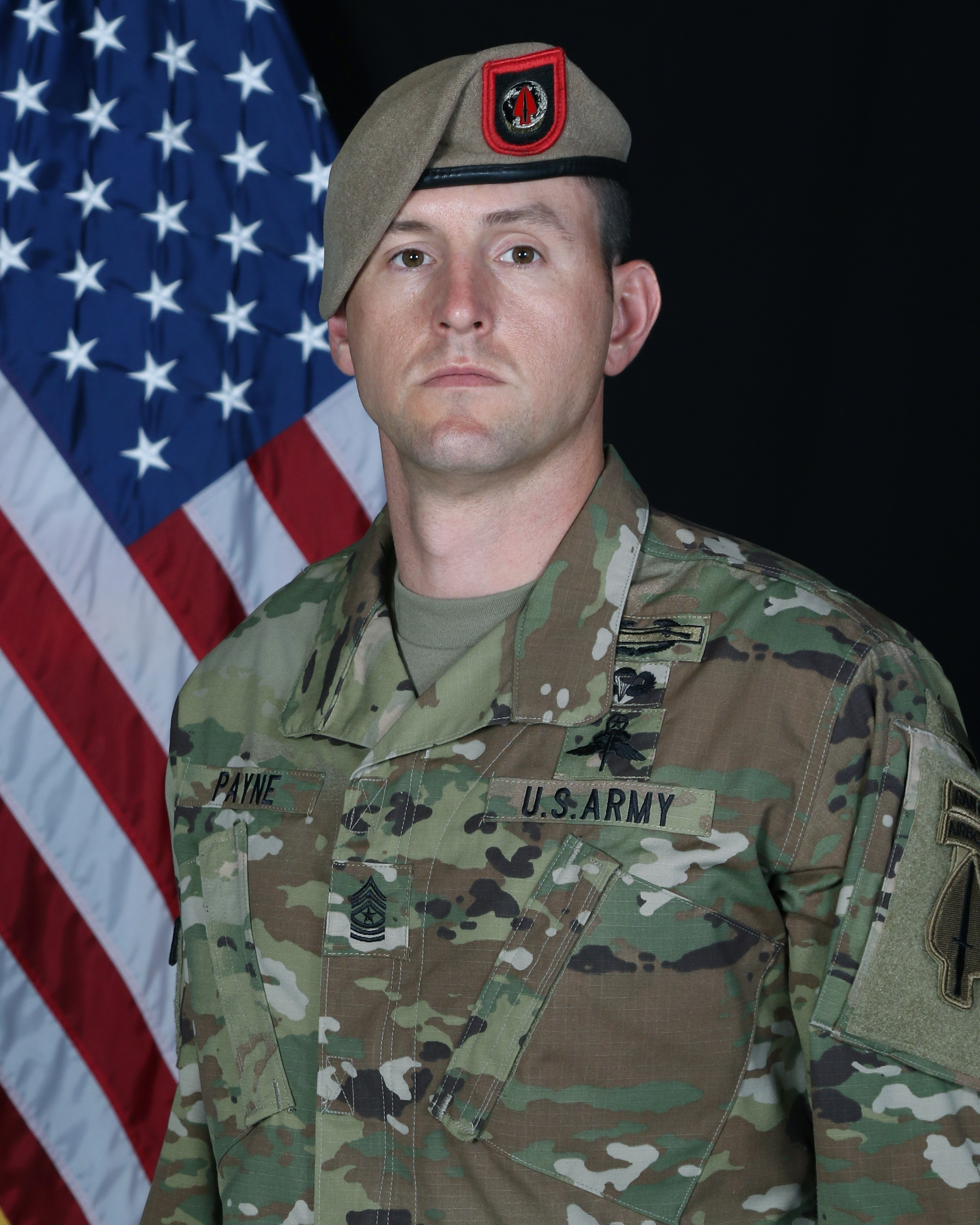
Payne in 2020

After high school, Payne enlisted in the United States Army as an infantryman on July 25, 2002, completing One Station Unit Training, the Basic Airborne Course, and the Ranger Indoctrination Program (RIP) (now known as the Ranger Assessment and Selection Program) throughout 2002 and 2003 at Fort Benning, Georgia.

Payne was then assigned as a rifleman to Company A, 1st Battalion, 75th Ranger Regiment, where he also served as a sniper and sniper team leader until November 2007, where he then completed a specialized selection and operator training course for assignment to the United States Army Special Operations Command's 1st Special Forces Operational Detachment – Delta at Fort Bragg, North Carolina. Since then, he has served within USASOC as a special operations team member, assistant team sergeant, team sergeant, and instructor.

In 2010, then-Staff Sergeant Payne was wounded in Afghanistan from a grenade blast, from which he made a complete recovery and eventually returned to duty.

In 2012, then-Sergeant First Class Payne and his then teammate, Master Sergeant Kevin Foutz, won the Best Ranger Competition in Fort Benning, Georgia.

Payne has been deployed 17 times in support of Operation Enduring Freedom, Operation Iraqi Freedom, Operation New Dawn, Operation Inherent Resolve, and Operation Resolute Support, and to the United States Africa Command area of responsibility.

Payne is a graduate of numerous military schools and courses, including Basic Airborne Course; Ranger Indoctrination Program; Ranger School; Sniper Course; Basic Leader Course; Basic Demolition Course; Advanced Demolition Course; Advanced Land Navigation; Survival, Evasion, Resistance and Escape; Free Fall Parachutist; Advanced Leader Course; Jumpmaster Course; Free Fall Jumpmaster Course; Joint Military Tandem Master Course; Senior Leader Course; Defense Language Institute (French); Special Forces Sniper Course; and Joint Special Operations Senior Enlisted Academy.

== Medal of Honor ==
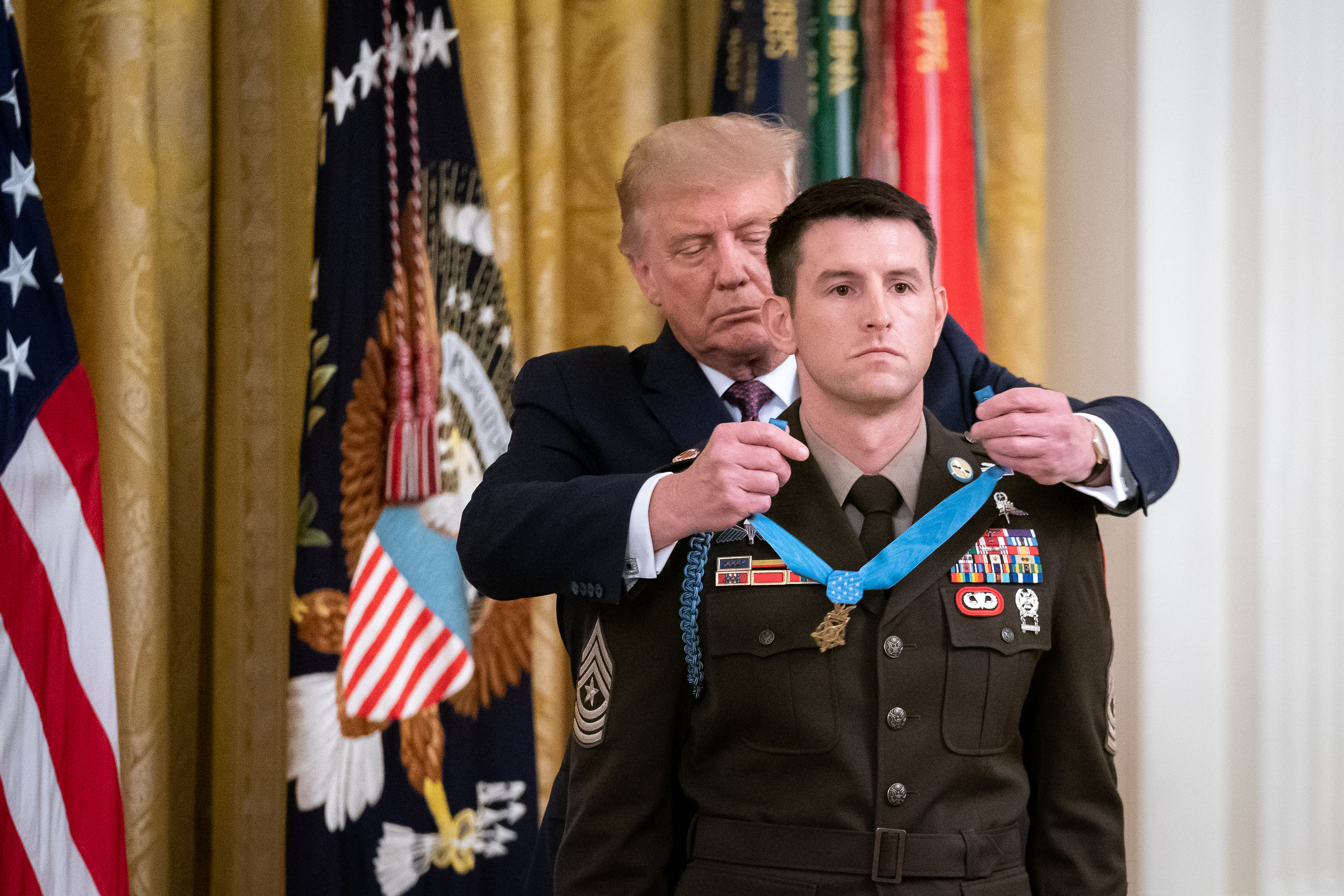
Payne receives the Medal of Honor from President Donald Trump, September 11, 2020

Payne was awarded the Medal of Honor on September 11, 2020, for his actions on October 22, 2015, during a hostage rescue at an Islamic State prison compound in the north of the town of Hawija, Kirkuk Province, Iraq, in support of Combined Joint Task Force – Operation Inherent Resolve. The joint operation, conducted with the Kurdish CTG (Counter-Terrorism Group), resulted in the rescue of 70 Iraqi prisoners with one American casualty, Delta Force Master Sergeant Joshua Wheeler. Payne received the Medal of Honor from President Donald Trump during a ceremony at the White House. He is the first living Delta Force member to receive the Medal of Honor, the third Delta Force recipient after Master Sergeant Gary Gordon and Sergeant First Class Randy Shughart who died in the 1993 Battle of Mogadishu, and the first Medal of Honor recipient for Operation Inherent Resolve.

=== Rescue operation ===
The task force prioritized the hostage rescue mission to prevent the execution of 70 prisoners after learning that new graves had been dug at the complex. The mission, which included Kurdish soldiers, commenced in the pre-dawn darkness with the landing of the team in CH-47 Chinook helicopters. The Kurdish troops unsuccessfully tried to blast open the prison wall with explosives which caused the enemy to open fire almost immediately. The Americans entered the complex by climbing over the wall at which Master Sergeant Joshua Wheeler was killed by ISIS gunfire. Payne and the team suppressed resistance at one prison building, cut the locks on cell doors, and freed 37 hostages.

An intense firefight was underway in a second building, which had started to burn. Payne and other US soldiers responded to radio calls for assistance and aided Kurdish soldiers who were pinned down at the second building. Amid gunfire, Payne and another soldier climbed a ladder to the roof of the building but could not gain entry. From the roof, they engaged enemy forces on the ground with gunfire and grenades before returning to the ground to seek another entry point after an ISIS fighter detonated a suicide vest to try to collapse the building. Payne and a Kurdish commando entered the burning building and faced intense gunfire from enemy combatants in a back room. Payne cut one door lock but retreated due to the heavy smoke and gunfire. A Kurdish commando tried to cut the second lock but failed. Payne entered the area again and cut the last lock, freeing 30 additional prisoners. As the building was collapsing, the order was given to evacuate. Payne stayed to direct everyone out, being the last person to exit after re-entering twice to ensure that no one was left behind. Payne and the team then formed a protective barrier as the hostages ran to the extraction helicopters.

=== Medal of Honor citation ===

Sergeant First Class Thomas P. Payne distinguished himself by conspicuous gallantry and intrepidity, above and beyond the call of duty, on October 22, 2015, during a daring nighttime hostage rescue in Kirkuk Province, Iraq, in support of Operation INHERENT RESOLVE. Sergeant Payne led a combined assault team charged with clearing one of two buildings known to house the hostages. With speed, audacity, and courage, he led his team as they quickly cleared the assigned building, liberating 38 hostages. Upon hearing a request for additional assaulters to assist with clearing the other building, Sergeant Payne, on his own initiative, left his secured position, exposing himself to enemy fire as he bounded across the compound to the other building from which entrenched enemy forces were engaging his comrades. Sergeant Payne climbed a ladder to the building’s roof, which was partially engulfed in flames, and engaged enemy fighters below with grenades and small arms fire. He then moved back to ground level to engage the enemy forces through a breach hole in the west side of the building. Knowing time was running out for the hostages trapped inside the burning building, Sergeant Payne moved to the main entrance, where heavy enemy fire had thwarted previous attempts to enter. He knowingly risked his own life by bravely entering the building under intense enemy fire, enduring smoke, heat, and flames to identify the armored door imprisoning the hostages. Upon exiting, Sergeant Payne exchanged his rifle for bolt cutters, and again entered the building, ignoring the enemy rounds impacting the walls around him as he cut the locks on a complex locking mechanism. His courageous actions motivated the coalition assault team members to enter the breach and assist with cutting the locks. After exiting to catch his breath, he reentered the building to make the final lock cuts, freeing 37 hostages. Sergeant Payne then facilitated the evacuation of the hostages, even though ordered to evacuate the collapsing building himself, which was now structurally unsound due to the fire. Sergeant Payne then reentered the burning building one last time to ensure everyone had been evacuated. He consciously exposed himself to enemy automatic gunfire each time he entered the building. His extraordinary heroism and selfless actions were key to liberating 75 hostages during a contested rescue mission that resulted in 20 enemies killed in action. Sergeant First Class Payne’s gallantry under fire and uncommon valor are in keeping with the highest traditions of military service and reflect great credit upon himself, the United States Special Operations Command, and the United States Army.

== Personal life ==
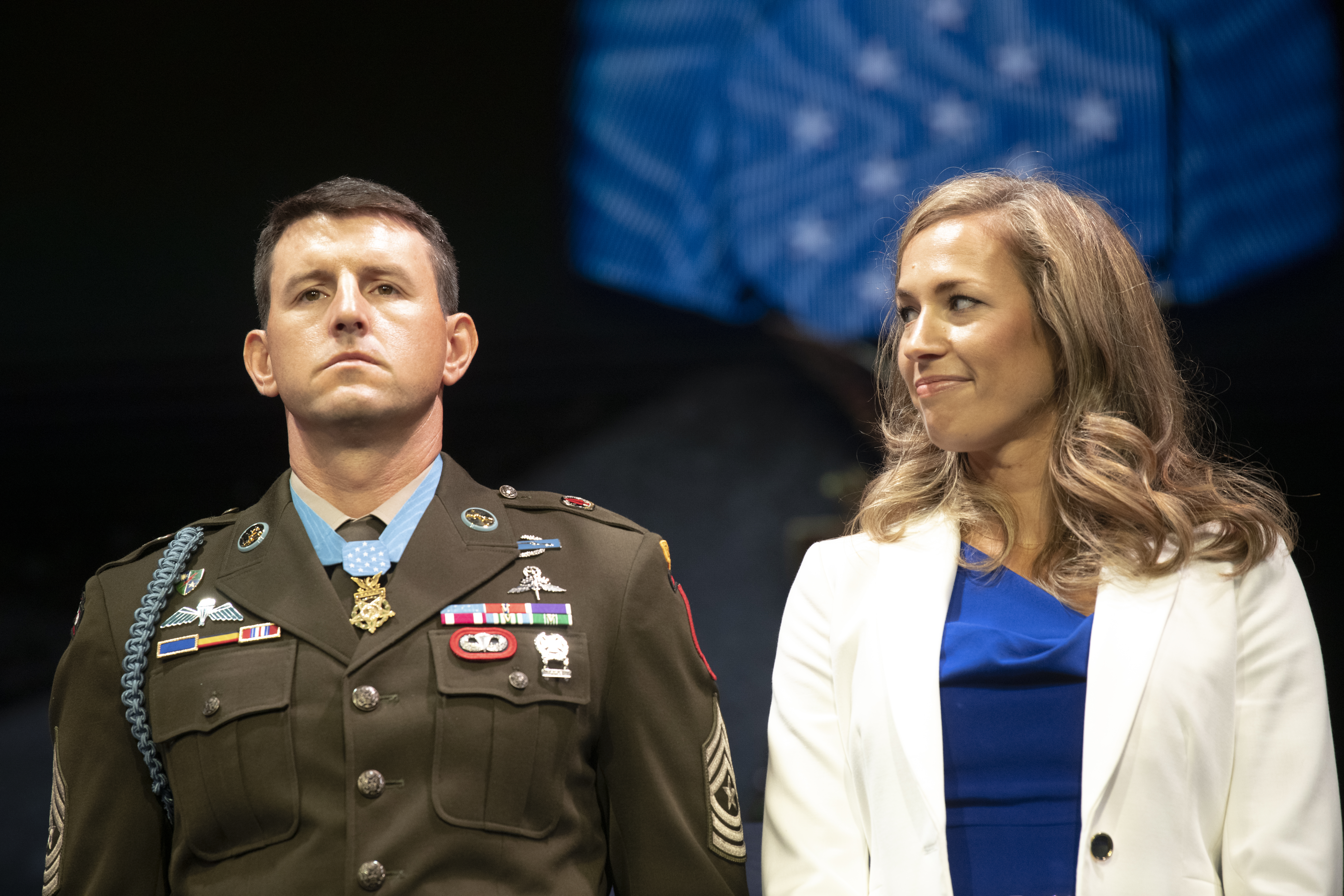
Payne with his wife Alison in 2022

Payne graduated from Norwich University in 2017 with a Bachelor of Science degree in strategic studies and defense analysis. As of June 2021, Payne is stationed at Fort Bragg, North Carolina, where he lives with his wife and three children. His wife, Alison, is a nurse who worked at St. Joseph's Hospital in Long Island, where she helped care for patients during the COVID-19 outbreak between April and May 2020. They met at Lake Murray while he was recovering from his wounds in South Carolina from a grenade blast in Afghanistan in 2010.

In February 2025, Payne appeared at the confirmation hearing in support of Tulsi Gabbard, nominee for Director of National Intelligence under Donald Trump.

== Awards and decorations ==
Medal of Honor Nominee Army Sgt. Maj. Thomas “Patrick” Payne

Payne has received:

Personal decorations
Medal of Honor (upgraded from the Army Distinguished Service Cross)
Bronze Star Medal with "V" device and three oak leaf clusters
Purple Heart
Defense Meritorious Service Medal with two oak leaf clusters
Meritorious Service Medal with oak leaf cluster
Joint Service Commendation Medal with Valor device
Army Commendation Medal with Valor device and silver oak leaf cluster
Army Good Conduct Medal (6 awards)
National Defense Service Medal
Afghanistan Campaign Medal with three bronze campaign stars
Iraq Campaign Medal with one silver campaign star
Inherent Resolve Campaign Medal with two bronze campaign stars
Global War on Terrorism Expeditionary Medal with one bronze campaign star
Global War on Terrorism Service Medal
NCO Professional Development Ribbon with bronze award numeral 3
Army Service Ribbon
Army Overseas Service Ribbon with award numeral 5
NATO Medal for service with ISAF
Unit awards
Army Presidential Unit Citation with four oak leaf clusters
Navy Presidential Unit Citation
Joint Meritorious Unit Award
Valorous Unit Award with three oak leaf clusters
Meritorious Unit Commendation
Superior Unit Award

Other accoutrements
Combat Infantryman Badge
Expert Infantryman Badge
Ranger tab
1st Ranger Battalion Combat Service Identification Badge
Basic Parachutist Badge with United States Army Special Operations Command background trimming
Military Freefall Jumpmaster Badge
Expert Marksmanship Badge with Rifle Component Bar
British Parachutist Badge
75th Ranger Regiment Distinctive Unit Insignia
8 Overseas Service Bars
6 Service stripes

- Payne and his partner, MSG Kevin Foutz also won the Best Ranger Competition in 2012.

== See also ==
- List of Delta Force members
- List of operations conducted by Delta Force
- List of post-Vietnam War Medal of Honor recipients
