= Angur =

Angur may refer to:

== People ==
- Angur Baba Joshi (born 1932), Nepalese social activist
- Angur family, which owns Alliance University in Bangalore, India

== Places ==
- Angūr, a village in Khorramabad County, Lorestan Province, Iran
- Angur Ada, a village in Waziristan, Pakistan, a border crossing between Pakistan and Afghanistan
  - Angur Ada raid, 2008 raid against the Taliban by American troops
- Pol-e Angur, a village in Khamir County, Hormozgan Province, Iran
- Qareh Angur, a village in Fariman County, Razavi Khorasan Province, Iran

== See also ==
- Angoor (disambiguation)
- Anguran (disambiguation)
