= List of operations conducted by SEAL Team Six =

This is an incomplete list of operations conducted by the US Naval Special Warfare Development Group.

== Invasion of Grenada ==
On 14 March 1979 the People's Revolutionary Army, led by Maurice Bishop, overthrew the newly independent government of the small island of Grenada and established a new regime based on socialist principles. This brought it into continuing conflict with the United States, as the administration of U.S. president Reagan considered the leftist government to be too closely allied to Cuba and the Soviet Union.

On 12 October 1983 a hard-line faction of the Central Committee of the Revolutionary Government of Grenada, controlled by former Deputy Prime Minister Bernard Coard, took control of the government from Bishop and placed him under house arrest. Within days, Bishop and many of his supporters were dead, and the nation had been placed under martial law. The severity of the violence, coupled with Coard's hard-line Marxism, caused deep concern among neighboring Caribbean nations, as well as in Washington, D.C. Adding to the U.S.'s concern was the presence of nearly 1,000 American medical students in Grenada. On 25 October, the United States invaded Grenada, an operation codenamed Operation Urgent Fury.

The invasion plan involved mixing conventional and special forces in a coordinated, surprise coup de main assault. SEAL Team Six was assigned three pre-invasion missions: two clandestine political missions relating to regime change on the island, and reconnaissance from the sea of the new airfield under construction on the island's southwest coast. There was almost no intelligence for these operations.

On 23 October, SEAL Team Six's Assault Group Three began the airport reconnaissance with a static line parachute drop, along with two combat-raiding small craft, well beyond detection by the Grenadian military. A rain squall accompanied by high winds broke out just before the SEALs conducted the water-drop rendezvous with the USS Clifton Sprague. One of two C-130 cargo planes transporting the SEALs to their drop point veered off course. Four SEALs drowned upon landing in the dark while carrying a full assortment of weapons, ammunition and combat equipment. Kenneth J. Butcher, Kevin E. Lundberg, Stephen L. Morris and Robert R. Schamberger were never seen again. The surviving SEAL jumpers were taken aboard the Navy frigate where they were joined by other waiting SEALs and an Air Force combat control team. After an unsuccessful search for the missing men, this 20-man group attempted to complete their delayed mission. Their open boats swamped while evading a suspected patrol boat, causing the mission to be aborted. A second attempt was made the next night, but it was also unsuccessful. In the end, the airport reconnaissance was successfully performed three hours before H-Hour on D-Day by an Air Force AC-130.

The two SEAL Team Six regime-change missions both involved Governor General Sir Paul Scoon, the Anglophile, Grenadian-born, appointed head-of-state. The principal mission was to fly to the governor general's mansion in the capital city, secure him, his wife and his staff and then move them all out of the combat area. The second, simultaneous regime-change mission was to capture and secure Grenada's long-distance radio transmitter station, located seven miles north of the capital city. The station was to be held until Scoon could broadcast a message to his county and the Caribbean, declaring that the intervention was both legal and desired. In the event, that D-Day message was delayed by events for three days.

The two SEAL regime-change missions were coordinated with a third, a prison assault assigned to Delta Force and Army Rangers. A mixed-service force of commandos departed behind schedule from Barbados in 9 Army transport helicopters at 0500 on D-Day, 25 October. By the time the UH-60 Black Hawks arrived over Grenadian soil, U.S. Marines had already landed on the east coast of the island and overt combat was underway. Marines waved as the late-arriving Black Hawks passed overhead.

=== Governor-General's mansion ===
Two Black Hawks carried two SEAL platoons to the two-story, Georgian-style building overlooking Grenada's capital city where Scoon lived and worked. Twenty-two SEALs fast-roped to the ground while under heavy enemy fire. The opposing fire damaged one of the helicopters and seriously wounded an Army flight commander. The stricken Black Hawk flew out to Navy ships offshore, also carrying away the SEAL's commanding officer and their portable satellite radio. Meanwhile, the assault team approached from the back of the mansion. The SEALs found Scoon and 10 other civilians hiding in the basement. The SEALs then continued to clear the rest of the house and began to set up a defensive perimeter to ensure security. Soon the mansion started to take fire from enemy soldiers armed with AK-47s and RPGs. As the incoming fire started to increase, Scoon and his party were moved to a safer location in the house. After the incoming fire had decreased, three men wearing Cuban-made uniforms approached the mansion, all of them carrying AK-47s. The SEALs shouted for the three men to stop where they were. When the three men heard the yells, they raised their weapons. The SEALs opened fire on the trio and killed them almost instantly. The SEALs suspected the men were Cubans, but the post-invasion evidence strongly indicates they were Grenadians.

Soon afterward, two BTR-60s rolled up to the mansion's gates. One of the BTRs at the mansion's front gate opened fire. Just as the SEALs were about to fire a M-72 LAW anti-tank rocket, the BTR backed off and left with the other BTR. The vehicles were chased off by two protective AC-130s. The only communications the team had been through limited-range MX-360 radios. The team used these hand-held radios to communicate with a SEAL command post on the island to call in airstrikes. As the radios' batteries started to fade, communications with the SEAL command post became weak. Once all the radios had died, when the SEALs urgently needed air support, they used a regular house phone to call JSOC, which was able to get an AC-130H Spectre gunship to hold station over the SEALs' position to provide air support.

When morning came, Marines from Company G of Battalion Landing Team 2/8 arrived to relieve the SEALs. The Governor General and his wife were evacuated to the USS Guam, the invasion force flagship, by Marine helicopter.

=== Radio station ===
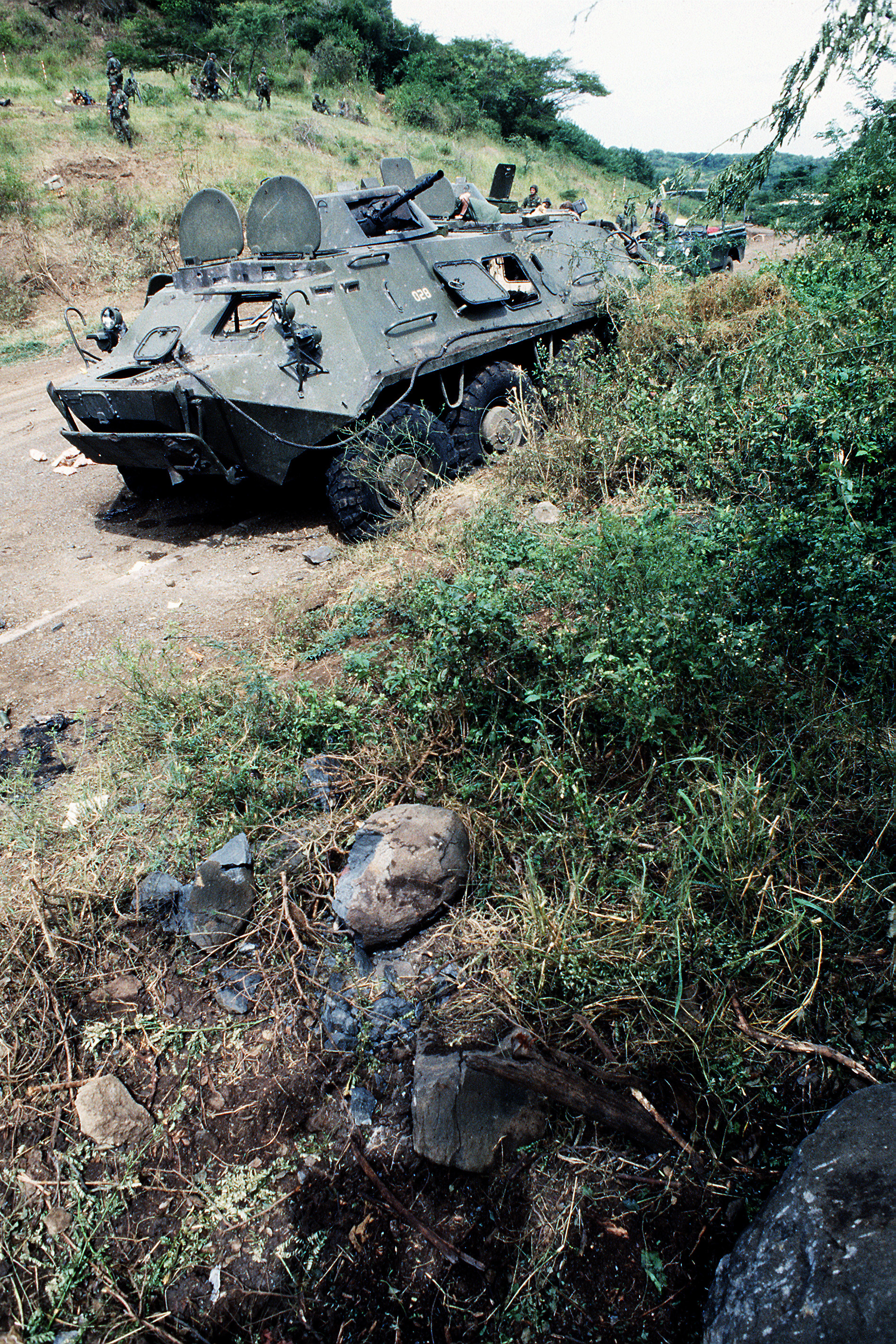
A Soviet-made BTR-60PB armored personnel carrier seized by U.S. forces during Operation Urgent Fury

While Scoon was being secured, 12 other operators from SEAL Team Six, under the command of Lt. Donald "Kim" Erskine, flew on to the radio station in a lone Black Hawk helicopter. The helicopter took small-arms fire on the insertion. Once the team landed, it quickly overran the radio station compound and took enemy prisoners. The SEALs were told to hold the station until Governor Scoon and a broadcast team could be brought in. After the team took control of the compound, it was not able to make radio contact with the SEAL command post. The SEALs set up a defensive perimeter while they continued to try to make radio contact. As this was happening, a truck with armed Grenadian soldiers arrived at the station. The SEALs ordered the soldiers to drop the weapons. After a brief tense standoff, the soldiers opened fire, but they were quickly neutralized. All the soldiers were killed or wounded by the SEALs.

The SEALs continued trying to make radio contact. Then a BTR-60 and three trucks, carrying a dozen soldiers each, were spotted coming towards the station. The soldiers flanked the building and the BTR covered the front entrance with its 14.5 mm KPV heavy machine gun. The incoming fire on the SEALs' position was becoming devastatingly heavy, and they were running out of ammunition. The SEALs were engaged with a numerically superior enemy force. The team realized that their only option was to change their original plan of holding the radio station, and instead disable the radio transmitter, then extract towards the water. They followed a pre-planned escape route out behind the station and across a broad meadow that led to a path that cut between cliffs and a beach. The meadow was exposed to Grenadian fire. The team leapfrogged across the exposed ground and took heavy fire, suffering several wounded. Finally reaching the end of the field, they cut through a chain-link fence, ran into dense brush, and followed the path to the beach. The Grenadians were still in pursuit, so the SEALs waded into the water and began swimming parallel to the shore until they found cliff ledges in which to hide. Once the Grenadians had given up the search, they swam out to sea. They were in the water for nearly six hours until a rescue plane spotted them and vectored the USS Caron, a destroyer, to pick them up. The officer in charge, Erskine, was wounded in the arm during the operation and was awarded the Purple Heart and Silver Star for heroism and leadership in commanding the assault element. Three other SEAL Team SIX members were wounded during the operation.

== Achille Lauro Hijacking ==
On 7 October 1985, the Italian cruise ship Achille Lauro carrying 400 passengers including American citizens was hijacked by Palestinian terrorists led by Mohammed Abul al-Abbas, also known as Muhammad Zaidan. The ship was hijacked in the Mediterranean sea and forced to sail to Southern Syria. President Ronald Reagan approved the deployment of Navy's SEAL Team SIX and Delta Force operators to plan and prepare for a rescue attempt to free the vessel from its hijackers. On 8 October, Syria refused permission for the ship to dock and subsequently the hijackers murdered Leon Klinghoffer, an elderly Jewish American businessman. The ship then sailed towards Port Said, Egypt. On 9 October, SEAL Team SIX assault members embarked on board the USS Iwo Jima (LPH-2), which steamed for Port Said. On 10 October, the four terrorist hijackers boarded an Egypt Air Boeing 737 airliner and flew from Cairo and headed for Tunisia. President Reagan approved military plans to intercept the aircraft over the Mediterranean Sea. Navy F-14 Tomcat fighters located the airliner south of Crete and forced the pilots to land at NAS Sigonella, the NATO airbase in Sicily. After the 737 touched down, two United States Air Force C-141 Starlifter cargo planes landed with SEAL Team SIX, who quickly surrounded the airplane but were then surrounded by Italian Carabinieri. The plane had come to a stop on the Italian controlled portion at Sigonella and therefore was on Italian Soil. As the SEALs prepared to assault the airplane, negotiations between the United States, Egyptian and Italian authorities continued. The four hijackers were eventually taken off the plane into the custody of the Italians without further escalation of hostilities.

== Panama ==
During Operation Just Cause in Panama, Special Operations Forces consisted of five unconventional task forces; GREEN (Army Delta Force), BLACK (3d Battalion, 7th Special Forces Group), RED (75th Ranger Regiment), BLUE (DEVGRU), and WHITE (Navy Sea-Air-Land, or SEAL Teams 4 and 2). DEVGRU's primary task, along with Delta Force, was locating and securing of Panamanian ruler General Manuel Noriega. Specific details of DEVGRU's involvement still remain classified.

== Somalia ==
During Operation Gothic Serpent in Somalia, DEVGRU was a part of Task Force Ranger. TF Ranger was made up of operators from Delta Force, the 75th Ranger Regiment, the 160th SOAR, the 24th Special Tactics Squadron, and SEALs from DEVGRU, as well as another NavSpecWar Unit. Eric T. Olson, John Gay, Howard Wasdin, James Olecki, T.W. Gray, Homer Nearpass and Richard Kaiser were the seven SEALs that fought in the 1993 Battle of Mogadishu during the last mission of Operation Gothic Serpent to capture the warlord Mohamed Farrah Aidid. Olson would receive the Silver Star for his actions, which were cited as "... during combat actions in Mogadishu, Somalia, in October 1993. While under withering enemy fire during actions in support of UNOSOM II operations, Captain Olson demonstrated a complete disregard for his own personal safety in the accomplishment of his mission". Olson became commander of the Naval Special Warfare Development Group one year later.

=== Killing Of Bilal al-Sudani ===
Bilal al-Sudani, also known as Suhayl Salim Abd el-Rahman, was a member of the al-Shabaab insurgency and later a member of Islamic State in Somalia. Al-Sudani was designated a terrorist by the U.S. in 2012 for his work in helping to finance foreigners traveling to al-Shabaab training camps. Al-Sudani later began to help finance ISIS in Africa and other countries including Afghanistan. In 2022, the U.S. accused al-Sudani of working with a South African, Abdella Hussein Abadigga, to recruit young men in South Africa for ISIS and send them to weapons training camps. He was likely in charge of the IS office in Somalia, which was influential in Afghanistan, the Democratic Republic of the Congo and Mozambique. Al-Sudani was killed by DEVGRU operators in a raid on a cave system in northern Somalia on 25 January 2023. The raid was intended to lead to his capture. Ten members of Al-Sudani's group were also killed in the operation with no civilian or U.S. casualties.

== Operation Uphold Democracy ==
In 1991 DEVGRU was responsible for the successful recovery of Haitian President Jean-Bertrand Aristide and his family during a coup that deposed him. In another successful operation, codenamed 'Victor Squared', operators from Red Squadron DEVGRU were tasked in extracting other key Haitians (possibly U.S. Intelligence assets/other members of Aristide's family) which also included an eighteen month old baby girl (who was a US citizen) and her family from a beach around the capital Port-au-Prince. Assisted by members of the Intelligence Support Activity who spirited these individuals to the extraction site where they would be picked up and taken back to a U.S. Navy nuclear guided missile cruiser stationed off the coast.

== NATO intervention in Bosnia, 1993–99 ==
During NATO's intervention in the Bosnian War, the NSWDG operated alongside other members of NATO's Implementation Force, such as its Army counterpart Delta Force and the British SAS. These units were tasked with finding and apprehending persons indicted for war crimes (PIFWC) and returning them to The Hague to stand trial. Some of DEVGRU's PIFWC operations under team leader William Waddell included apprehending Goran Jelisić, Simo Zaric, Milan Simic, Miroslav Tadic, and Radislav Krstić.

== War in Afghanistan ==
=== Attempt to locate Bin Laden in Tora Bora ===
In 2001, a CIA source reported seeing Bin Laden in Tora Bora, and a significant proportion of the ISR assets available in the theatre converged on the area. The initial plan based around a small helicopter assault force soon expanded to include U.S. Army Special Forces Green Beret ODAs and a Ranger element to provide a cordon for the SEALs. Eventually the operation was launched under the cover of Air Force bombing, but after fruitless searching through the mountains, there was no sign of him.

=== Operation Enduring Freedom – Afghanistan ===
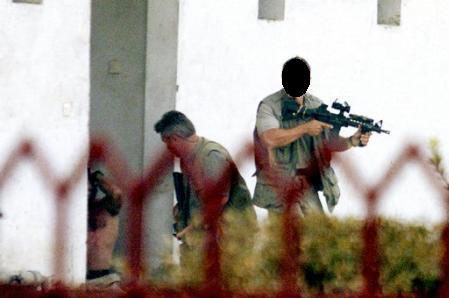
SEAL Team Six during 2002 assassination attempt on Afghan President Hamid Karzai

In Afghanistan during Operation Enduring Freedom (OEF), U.S. Special Operations forces played a central role in the fighting. It was also here they began to specialize in counter-terrorist tactics and information.

==== Beginning of DEVGRU operations in Afghanistan ====
During the coalition invasion of Afghanistan a squadron from DEVGRU was part of Task Force Sword (later renamed Task Force 11 in January 2002), which was established in early October 2001. It was a black SOF unit under direct command of JSOC. This was a so-called hunter-killer force whose primary objective was capturing or killing senior leadership and HVT within both al-Qaeda and the Taliban. As part of Task Force Bowie, SEALS from DEVGRU were part of the AFOs – a 45-man reconnaissance unit made up of Delta Force recon specialists, members of the Regimental Reconnaissance Company augmented by selected SEALs from DEVGRU and supported by ISA's technical experts. The AFOs had been raised to support TF Sword and were tasked with intelligence preparation of the battlefield, working closely with the CIA and reporting directly to TF Sword. AFO conducted covert reconnaissance – sending small 2 or 3-man teams into al-Qaeda 'Backyard' along the border with Pakistan, the AFO operators would deploy observation posts to watch and report enemy movements and numbers as well as environmental reconnaissance; much of the work was done on foot or ATVs.

==== Operation Anaconda ====
===== Mako 31 destroys a DShK position =====
On 28 February 2002, on the eve of Operation Anaconda, three AFO teams were infiltrated into the Shahikot Valley, one of them (known as Mako 31) was composed of three SEALs from DEVGRU's Red Team, a USAF Combat controller and a US Navy EOD operator. They infiltrated the area on foot via the southern edge of the valley to set up an observation post on a terrain feature known as 'The Finger.' All three teams were tasked with confirming enemy strengths and dispositions including anti-aircraft emplacements, ensuring the designated Rakkasan HLZs were clear of obstructions, and providing terminal guidance for air support both prior to and during the insertion of conventional forces. Near H-Hour on 1 March 2002, Mako 31 found a group of foreign fighters had an established position and were manning a DShK HMG on the peak where they planned to set up an observation post. If the DShK was not disabled before then, it could shoot down Chinooks carrying conventional forces. The SEALs, therefore, planned to ambush the terrorists in the pre-dawn darkness before the Rakkasans flew into the valley. However, they were spotted by an Uzbek insurgent and a brief firefight ensued, killing 5 out of 7 foreign fighters, as another insurgent fired a PKM, the team broke contact and brought in an AC-130 which destroyed the enemy encampment with 105 mm rounds. The DShK was also destroyed by the AC-130. Mako 31 swept through the destroyed enemy position to conduct a bomb damage assessment and to recover any intelligence materials. Later, an American battalion commander's tactical HQ landed by Black Hawk on a ridge below 'The Finger' where Mako 31 had earlier eliminated the enemy DShK position. Avoiding enemy fire, the American tactical HQ successfully linked up with Mako 31. Mako 31's attached USAF Combat Controller joined forces with the battalion commander's air liaison to direct fast airstrikes onto the enemy positions. After some time passed by, the American tactical HQ was extracted by a Chinook as Mako 31 stood by providing overwatch. Near the end of Operation Anaconda, Mako 31 withdrew and extracted.

===== Battle of Takur Ghar =====
During the crucial Battle of Takur Ghar, part of Operation Anaconda, a small team of DEVGRU assigned to an AFO task force was tasked with establishing observation positions (OPs) on the high ground above the proposed landing zones of U.S. conventional forces. It was one of the most violent battles of Operation Anaconda. In the early hours of 4 March 2002 a MH-47E Chinook helicopter piloted by the U.S. Army's 160th SOAR "Nightstalkers" was carrying Mako 21 and Mako 30 teams mostly made up of SEALs from DEVGRU. The original plan was that MAKO 21 would link up with AFO team Juliet at the northern end of the valley, resupply it and then establish a hide site/observation post on the eastern ridge above Task Force Rakkasan's blocking position; whilst MAKO 30 planned to establish an observation point on the peak of Takur Ghar, which commanded a view of the Shahi-Kot valley. Mako 30 would be inserted at a point 4,300 feet (1,300 m) east of the peak, but circumstances led the SEALs to choose the summit of Takur Ghar itself as the insertion point. As the helicopter was nearing its landing zone both the pilots and the men in the back observed fresh tracks in the snow, goatskins, and other signs of recent human activity. As the pilots and team discussed a mission abort, an RPG struck the side of the aircraft, wounding one crewman as machine-gun bullets ripped through the fuselage, cutting hydraulic and oil lines. Fluid spewed about the ramp area of the helicopter. As the pilot struggled to get the helicopter away Neil C. Roberts, a DEVGRU SEAL in the ramp area of the aircraft, was hit and slipped on the oil as the helicopter took off. He fell approximately 5 to 10 feet (1.5 to 3.0 m) to the snowy ground below. Roberts immediately engaged enemy forces with his weapons, including a Mk.46 Mod 0 Light Machine Gun, SIG Sauer P226 Mk.25 Mod 0 9 mm semi-automatic pistol and grenades. He survived at least 30 minutes before he was shot and killed at close range. Mako 30 was inserted in an attempt to recover Roberts, then ran into a bunker housing 3 al-Qaeda fighters and killed them. They were next engaged in a 20-minute firefight and suffered several wounded, forcing them to break contact and call for a QRF. USAF Technical Sergeant John Chapman, a Combat Controller with the 24th Special Tactics Squadron, was mistakenly left behind by the SEALs. Chapman fought alone, killing enemy fighters with scrounged weapons and in hand-to-hand combat. He was finally killed while providing covering fire to distract Taliban fighters from an approaching rescue helicopter. For his actions, Chapman earned the Medal of Honor. The mountaintop of Takur Ghar was cleared of all enemy forces and secured by 2 squads from 1/75 of the 75th Ranger Regiment after the battle of Takur Ghar had lasted 17 hours. The Rangers rescued all involved and fought valorously to rescue the SEALS and to recover Neil Roberts and John Chapman. All American casualties, including Neil C. Roberts and John Chapman, were recovered. Mako 30 SEALs from DEVGRU, along with all the other American units such as the 75th Ranger Regiment, extracted from Takur Ghar by Chinooks.

===== Intercepting and Destroying an Enemy Convoy =====
On 17 March 2002, in the final days of Operation Anaconda, operators from DEVGRU (commanded by the SEAL who led the Mako 30 mission on Takur Ghar), with an attached British SBS operator, intercepted a convoy of al-Qaeda fighters traveling in 3 SUVs via 3 MH-47E Chinooks, with a mixed force of U.S. Army Rangers traveling in MH-60K Blackhawk helicopters as back up. After an ensuing firefight, 16 al-Qaeda fighters were killed and 2 seriously wounded were captured. The American force suffered no casualties. As the DEVGRU SEALs and Rangers searched and treated the wounded prisoners. They also prepared the enemy vehicles, weapons, and munitions for destruction. Then the DEVGRU SEALs, Rangers, and British SBS operative extracted from the area by their Chinooks.

==== Protecting Hamid Karzai ====
On 5 September 2002, DEVGRU operators protected President Hamid Karzai during an assassination attempt in Kandahar. The DEVGRU operatives shot the would be assassins, accidentally shooting two Afghan soldiers who were wrestling with the assassin. During the attack, a round ricocheted and hit a SEAL operative in the head lightly wounding him, requiring him to improvise a bandage with his t-shirt.

==== Escorting a detainee ====
In 2003, Khalid Sheikh Mohammed was arrested in a joint CIA and ISI operation in Pakistan and had to be flown out to a US Black site prison. Companies from the US Army Rangers and 82nd Airborne Division secured an improvised desert strip in a dry river bed near the Pakistani border, an MC-130H Combat Talon II plane landed and lowered its ramp. SEALs from DEVGRU appeared in Desert Patrol Vehicles carrying the detainee arrived and drove up the ramp into the back of the plane, which then taxied and lifted off.

==== Raid in Jalalabad ====
It was April 2005, a group of DEVGRU SEALs were sent in to Afghanistan to hunt high value Al-Qaeda targets. After the SEALs flew to Afghanistan arriving at Jalalabad airport. The SEALs got into Toyota Hilux pickup trucks and drove into the city. They arrived at their safe house. Their SEAL team leader waiting at the safe house greeted them and debriefed them of their mission of hunting high value al-Qaeda targets. After the SEALs adjusted to their new lifestyle. They went through leisurely activities, interacted with the locals, and gathered intelligence. Since there wasn't a huge American presence at the time, the Americans didn't feel like occupiers. The American SEALs did not dress in uniform and were thus able to blend in and look less intimidating. The relationship between the locals and the SEALs were very good. At times at the safehouse, there were lines of dozens of Afghan civilians who wanted to work for the Americans. The SEALs would also give chocolate to children who asked for it. The Afghan children loved the American SEALs and the SEALs loved them back. The parents of the children saw that and grew protective of the Americans. To further blend in, the SEALs hired people to drive the SEALs in three-wheeled vehicles called tuk-tuks. At times, the SEALs dressed up in local garb in Jalalabad. Then the SEALs received intelligence that there was a house where a terrorist lived. Since the SEAL team leader didn't have a large raiding force to capture the target, more SEALs were called in from Bagram down to Jalalabad. After assessing intelligence gathered. The SEALs drove to the house they targeted a few hours after sundown. The locals went to sleep early in Afghanistan. After driving through alleys and main streets. The SEAL team leader led his men on foot a few more blocks and then pointed out the house. The team leader placed an explosive breach on the front gate. The breach blew the gate open and the SEALs moved in. The DEVGRU SEALs rolled up every adult male and then talked to them using an interpreter who accompanied them. The women sat in the corners with the children. The SEALs comforted the children with glowsticks or candy. The interpreter interrogated the suspects to tell the SEALs who the terrorists were. The target found was a Saudi Arabian. The SEAL team leader cuffed the Saudi Arabian terrorist. The SEALs hauled the prisoner out, drove him to the airfield, and put him on the plane to Bagram. Up there the Americans had expert interrogation from different agencies and military branches to get some intelligence leading to other targets.

==== Attempted rescue of a British security contractor ====
In September 2005, a British security contractor was kidnapped by Taliban insurgents in Farah Province, JSOC managed to locate the hostage and insurgents in a mountainous region of Bala Buluk. A DEVGRU team arrived in an early morning raid, but the Taliban murdered the hostage.

==== Attack on an enemy compound ====
In July 2006, a pair of MH-47Es from 160th SOAR attempted to insert a combined strike element of DEVGRU, Rangers and Afghan commandos in Helmand Province so it could attack a target compound. With some troops on the ground, a large insurgent force ambushed them, both helicopters were struck by small arms fire, one MH-47E pilot put his aircraft directly in the line of fire protecting the other MH-47E whose assault team it was carrying was still disembarking. Inevitably the MH-47E was hit by an RPG which caused it to crash-land, the skill of the Nightstalker pilots saved the operators and the aircrew, no one was seriously wounded in the crash. The Ranger commander and a 2nd Commando Regiment operator who was attached to DEVGRU at the time organised an all-round defence while the other MH-47E held back the advancing insurgents until its miniguns ran out of ammunition, an AC-130 Spectre joined the battle and kept the down crew and passengers safe until a British Immediate Response Team helicopter successfully recovered them, the AC-130 then destroyed the MH-47E wreck – denying it to the Taliban.

==== Raid on a house in Afghanistan ====
On 31 October 2006. DEVGRU SEALs conducted a raid on a house in Afghanistan. The SEALs were shorthanded so they only had four members available for the raid. One SEAL would provide overwatch while the other three SEALs would assault the house. After entering the house, the point man got into a fistfight with an insurgent. The second SEAL entering saw with his night vision two enemy combatants waking up and start reaching for their AK-47 rifles. The second SEAL opened fire killing both insurgents. The first SEAL who was in a fistfight with the surviving insurgent finally overpowered him by restraining him in a headlock. The SEALs put a hood on the captured insurgent's head and left the building so they could extract. As the SEALs were moving to the extraction point with their captured prisoner, a big dog charged at them barking. The SEAL who was in overwatch fired two shots killing the attack dog thus saving the lives of his fellow DEVGRU operatives.

==== Rescue of 61-year old Engineer ====
In August 2008, an American Army Corps of Engineers worker was taken hostage by members of Gulbuddin Hekmatyar's militant group known as Hezb-i-Islami. The hostage was taken to and held in the mountains of Wardak Province some 30 miles west of Kabul, two of the Hezb-i-Islami militants were guarding the American hostage. The captors were confident that they were safe out of the U.S. military's reach by the treacherous terrain that would supposedly discourage or deter a rescue attempt. So the guards let down their guard not expecting any rescue operation to be mounted. However, DEVGRU overcame difficulties dealing with the environment after operating in the Afghan region for a long time in other operations following 9/11. So the SEALs of DEVGRU were capable of mounting a rescue operation. The hostage's location was finally pinpointed in October 2008. Approximately two dozen DEVGRU operators from Blue Squadron were set down a few miles from the location of where the hostage was held in a hut. The SEALs successfully trekked through treacherous mountainous terrain, quietly approaching the hut that held the hostage following a hike for more than four hours. The two militant guards were at the hut. One was posted in the hut while the other was posted outside. A seven-man assault force stealthily crept forward and infiltrated the hut structure. With sound suppressed weapons, the DEVGRU operators killed both guards. After setting the American hostage free, the SEALs safely exfiltrated the hostage back to their headquarters by helicopter. Then the liberated hostage was taken to the U.S. embassy in Kabul.

==== Raid in Central Afghan mountains, South of Kabul 2009 ====
DEVGRU conducted a raid in the Central Afghan mountains, south of Kabul on some compounds. As the DEVGRU SEALs landed at their target objective by helicopter. An American drone in the air tracked the movement of eight Taliban fighters who ran out of the compound when the SEALs arrived. The SEALs immediately pursued the fleeing enemy after their helicopter transport landed. The Taliban fighters who fled the compounds were headed for a ridgeline three hundred meters north of the compound. The first group of SEALs were trying to cut off the enemy fighters who fled the compound while another group of SEALs proceeded to clear the compound. The first group of SEALs who pursued the fleeing enemy fighters. When the enemy was spotted, the DEVGRU SEALs opened fire killing three fighters. The rest of the fighters left their dead and continued to race down the backside of the ridge. The American drone pilot notified the SEALs on radio that five Taliban fighters were headed north toward several other compounds. A laser from the drone moved down the backside of the hill showing the SEALs which direction to follow the five fighters. The SEALs advanced cautiously toward the ridge position and found the three dead Taliban fighters lying on the ground. One had a machine gun next to his body while another had a RPG on the ground. From the ridgeline, the SEALs could see the surviving fleeing fighters continue retreating down the backside of the hill. One of the SEALs took the RPG rocket launcher from the deceased enemy fighter and fired it at the fleeing survivors. The rocket landed nearby, and the shrapnel peppered the fighters as they ran. Then an AC-130 gunship providing air support for the SEAL operators bombarded the Taliban fighters with 20mm cannon fire. The SEALs continued to spend the rest of the night chasing down the remaining fighters. All of them were either mortally wounded or dead. Two SEALs chased a fighter into one of the compounds, while the rest of the SEALs started to clear a field of waist-deep grass. A combat dog that accompanied the SEALs locked onto the scent of a fighter about fifty feet to the right of the SEALs. The dog attacked the fighter who was hidden in a ditch. There was screaming from the fighter as the dog struggled with the fighter. The SEALs called the dog off and after the dog got safely out of the way. The SEALs threw hand grenades into the ditch where the fighter was waiting to ambush the SEALs. The SEALs then moved up to clear the ditch. One Navy SEAL went forward further to investigate and found another dead enemy fighter with an AK-47 and chest rack. After completing their night raid on the Taliban fighters, the DEVGRU SEALs returned to their base in Jalalabad. The SEALs suffered no casualties while killing more than ten enemy fighters that night.

==== Bowe Bergdahl ====
In June 2009, US Army infantryman Bowe Bergdahl deserted his post with 1st Battalion, 501st Infantry Regiment, and was subsequently captured by the Taliban. Over his five years of captivity, DEVGRU Red Squadron operators and Rangers from the 75th Ranger Regiment "spun up" operations to rescue him, but each resulted in a "dry hole." One such operation carried out south of Kabul in July 2009 resulted in SEAL Senior Chief Petty Officer James Hatch being seriously wounded, and a combat assault dog (Remco) killed.

==== Raid in Kunar, August 2009 ====
After the mission in an unsuccessful attempt at rescuing Bowe Bergdahl which had a DEVGRU operative wounded and a combat assault dog killed, DEVGRU was prepared for another operation. This operation was to conduct a raid on a couple of compounds in Kunar to eliminate Taliban fighters and then withdraw back to base after completing their objective. So two teams of SEALs were formed to infiltrate through terrain that was thought impassible. Since there was the possibility of enemy lookouts watching out for American forces moving out on the trail away from their base. The army of the U.S. armed forces would patrol together with the two teams of Navy Seals when leaving their base. After the combined army and SEAL patrol traveled some distance, the Navy Seals would break off from the patrol and sneak off unseen while the larger army formation would keep on traveling as bait/distraction for the possible enemy lookouts to spy on. The two teams of SEALs traveled through their infiltration route and finally made it to the target compounds. With the element of surprise, the SEALs with mostly with sound suppressed carbines, a few light machine guns, and some sniper rifles struck with perfect precision and killed all seventeen Taliban fighters that were occupying the compounds with not a single casualty inflicted on the SEALs. The SEALs then successfully conducted SSE at the target compounds. Taliban reinforcements were arriving some distance away in increasing numbers. So the SEALs destroyed all the enemy weapons and ammunition they found with timed explosives. Then the SEALs withdrew safely back to base a long distance while an AC-130 gunship provided air cover bombarding the incoming Taliban reinforcements which may have killed an estimated seven or eight more Taliban fighters. After arriving back at base, the SEALs handed over all the intelligence gathered from their SSE to the army captain.

==== Raid in a valley in Afghanistan ====
The DEVGRU SEALs were on a winter deployment in 2009. U.S. intelligence analysts were tracking a group of fighters in a valley south of Kabul. The U.S. analysts were tracking down a very high-level Taliban commander and his group. Using multiple sources including drones, they were able to locate the enemy commander and his fighters. Even though the Americans knew these were Taliban insurgents, they carried no weapons meaning that the Americans could not bomb them with air strikes by the rules of engagement. So U.S. high command had to send in the DEVGRU operatives to get close to the Taliban element and eliminate them after confirming that they were enemy insurgents. The SEALs knew that this element of insurgents would conduct more attacks or set IEDs that would kill or critically injure more American/Coalition forces. The planning was left to the SEALs. The DEVGRU SEALs decided that they would fly in and land well down the valley, far enough away from the village that the Taliban wouldn't hear the noise from the SEAL helicopters in the darkness. The SEALs inserted at an isolated area accompanied by U.S. Army Rangers, Afghan commandos, and U.S. army battle space owners (BSO)s. The DEVGRU SEALs patrolled to their target area for a number of hours. The American drone pilots reported that the Taliban element had come to a building and were bedding down for the night. A Taliban guard was positioned on a little saddle overlooking the valley. The only approach to the new target was between the saddle and a small knoll. As the Americans moved into position and begun slowly making their way toward the target, the Taliban guard spotted the DEVGRU SEALs. The guard had an AK-47 rifle slung across his chest. He turned and ran toward the house where his fellow insurgents were sleeping. The drone pilot contacted the SEALs and warned that multiple movers were fleeing. The SEALs advanced to the end of a line of compounds opposite where the fighters were running. The DEVGRU snipers at the front of the formation already set up their position. The point SEAL spotted two enemy fighters sprinting who were attempting to run down an adjacent knoll. The DEVGRU SEAL snipers shot down and killed the two insurgents. The rest of the fighters stopped running and dove for cover. The SEAL snipers were in place and had the enemy pinned down and unable to escape. The U.S. Army Rangers made their way to the top of the knoll and were stacked up on the back side of the hill behind the line of compounds. The SEALs ordered the Captain of the army rangers to set up his machine guns and lay down a base of fire on the enemy position. The rangers set up their machine guns and grenade launchers. The SEALs would flank right. The rangers laid down fire with their machine guns and grenade launchers. Then the drone pilot contacted the SEALs warning that there were two fleeing insurgents moving on the American's left. So a small team of SEALs sent after them. The other SEALs remained to engage the enemy remaining at the house. The SEAL snipers also stayed to help keep the enemy at the house pinned down. The SEALs remaining behind flanked the enemy. The SEALs and rangers had a perfect "L"-shape ambush on the enemy position. The SEALs crept down toward the building on the left flank while the Rangers and DEVGRU snipers laid down a diversionary fire on the enemy. When the SEALs had reached the house, they radioed the snipers and rangers to cease fire. After the fired ceased, the flanking SEALs advanced. But one of the SEALs spotted a hidden insurgent on the ground attempting to ambush the SEALs. The SEALs chief opened fired and killed the insurgent before he could fire on them. Then the SEALs continued to clear the buildings and found three dead fighters lying on the ground. That brought up a total of five enemy dead fighters. The other small group of SEALs who had gone after the two fleeing Taliban had successfully killed the two remaining insurgents with the help of an AC-130 gunship. The SEALs searched through the dead fighters looking for any intelligence that could lead them to another target. The two U.S. army battle space owners took pictures and took notes. Then the SEALs and battle space owners gathered up the fighter's weapons and gears destroying them with explosives. The SEALs and their allies prepared to leave quickly since they were in enemy territory. After the loud gun battle, large number of Taliban reinforcements would be waking up to strike back. The SEALs and their allies suffered no casualties after successfully wiping out this Taliban element that would be no longer a threat to the American/coalition forces. Finally, the DEVGRU SEALs and their allies extracted back to base.

==== Successful night raid ====
It was a late winter afternoon in Afghanistan. The DEVGRU SEALs were about to be given another mission. A Predator drone had been observing a group of Taliban fighters numbering five to seven fighters traveling from compound to compound, looking for a warm bed and meal. The U.S. personal observing from the drone feed saw that the insurgents walked through town and decide to hide out at this random house for the night. The insurgents knocked on the door and when the people inside answered, the insurgents pushed through the door. They even moved their vehicles inside the compound's wall. The DEVGRU SEALs would be sent in to eliminate this Taliban group. The SEALs planned to land about five kilometers from the target and patrol to the compound. This would allow the SEALs to keep the element of surprise. The DEVGRU SEALs loaded up into their chinooks and flew to their destination. After the SEALs had landed, the chinooks took off. The SEALs got into patrol formation and started toward the compound where the enemy fighters would be asleep. When the SEALs had reached the compound, they prepared to assault it. The DEVGRU SEALs infiltrated the compound successfully and stealthily making their way inside. As the SEALs were making their way through the compound. One SEAL opened a room where he suspected where the fighters were sleeping. The rusty hold hinges of the door let out a long squeak. The SEAL with his night vision goggles on could make out man-sized lumps lying under blankets. As the SEAL scanned the room, a Taliban fighter just to the left side of the door tried to identify who was at the door. The fighter had a large belt-fed PKM machine gun. As the insurgent grabbed the machine gun, the DEVGRU SEAL leaned in and shot him twice in the face with his sound suppressed rifle killing the insurgent. The SEAL raised his rifle to cover the rest of the room and saw AK-47 rifles leaning against the wall. There were five enemy fighters sleeping who were starting to wake up. The SEAL quickly fired 2-3 shots in each fighter killing all five of them. After the SEALs had cleared the compound, they accounted for a total of six dead Taliban fighters. All of the unarmed civilians including the women and children were not harmed in this successful night raid. One of the SEALs also did his best to comfort the women and children as the SEALs were clearing the area as they accounted for five AK-47 rifles, one PKM machine gun, and two RPGs with several rockets. After the SEALs successfully wiped out this Taliban element with good stealth and precision. The SEALs patrolled back to their helicopter landing zone and extracted back to base.

==== Capturing a Taliban leader ====
It was summer 2010. The DEVGRU SEALs were adjusting to better improve their methods to perform their missions in Afghanistan. Later on, the SEALs got another target to snatch and grab. The target was a Taliban commander or facilitator. The SEALs tracked the target to a bed-down location in a village near the Pakistani border. After the SEALs raided the compound and captured him, the SEALs exfiltrated out of the area with their prisoner.

==== Successful elimination of two Taliban commanders ====
Further in the summer of 2010, the DEVGRU SEALs were going on another mission. To eliminate two Taliban commanders. The SEALs traveled to the target location by helicopters and inserted a good distance away where the enemy would not hear the rotors of the helicopters. The DEVGRU operatives and Afghan commandos would then patrol to the target area. After they had arrived near some compounds. The SEALs advanced quietly. An American drone controlled by an American pilot flying overhead kept surveillance over the area radioed to the SEALs that there were two movers leaving the target compound and heading east. The two movers were the Taliban commanders. They were both armed with AK-47 assault rifles. They ran into two American personal. The two Americans were a DEVGRU SEAL and an American PJ. The two Taliban commanders with their AK-47 rifles skid to a stop and attempted to fire. Before they had a chance to level their AK-47s. The SEAL and American PJ quickly fired multiple rounds into each Taliban commander killing them both. "Two EKIA" radioed the SEAL. The DEVGRU SEALs had successfully killed the two Taliban commanders.

==== Raid in Northern Afghanistan ====
DEVGRU operatives inserted near Northern Afghanistan for their mission as intelligence picked up a tip that a high-level Taliban commander was in the area. American analysts tracked the commander and watched via ISR as he moved from location to location, picking up fighters along the way. American drones had seen previously before the SEAL deployment that the fighters were in a tree line. So the DEVGRU SEALs headed towards the tree line after their insertion. As the SEALs were sneaking toward the tree line, native dogs were barking as the SEALs patrolled toward the area for seven kilometers. The DEVGRU SEALs had a squad of U.S. Army Rangers and Afghan commandos accompanying them. The U.S. Rangers and Afghan commandos slowly crept through the waist-deep grass and settled into an overwatch or support-by-fir position to provide suppressive fire in case of the SEALs ran into any trouble. The SEALs passed through some trees trying not to make any noise. The DEVGRU SEALs came upon two enemy fighters who were asleep on the ground with their AK-47 rifles lying nearby. The SEALs were all using suppressed weapons. But they still didn't risk firing on them to not alert the other Taliban. Two SEALs stayed behind to cover the sleeping enemy sentries while the rest of the SEAL team moved on. THE DEVGRU SEALs reached the tree line where the rest of the main enemy element was supposed to be at. Two SEALs armed with a MK-46 light machine gun set up a position to the left flank. As the SEALs made it to the tree line, they spotted a head pop up and disappear. The SEALs couldn't shoot by the rules of engagement. Then a Taliban fighter stood out and fired from a belt-fed PKM machine gun. The SEALs either dropped to the ground or dive for cover. Some of the SEALs fired back. The SEALs on the left flank with the M-46 light machine gun fired a barrage of rounds at the enemy suppressing him. The SEALs caught in the open maneuvered back to cover while also providing suppressive fire. All of the SEALs made it to safe cover. Then the U.S. Army Rangers opened heavy fire with heavy machine guns, grenade launchers, and other small arms. The tree line exploded into kindling. After the SEALs made a headcount, they decided to call in an airstrike. None of the SEALs were injured or harmed. The American aerial fighters conducted two bombing runs on the enemy in the tree line. After the airstrikes, the SEALs patrolled back to the tree line and found two burned dead enemy fighters. The SEALs then heard that a drone pilot say that there were multiple hostile movers one hundred and fifty meters to the west. There were six enemy movers. The drone's sensor operator fired an infrared laser at the location of where the six enemy fighters had fled to which could only be seen by the SEALs with their night vision goggles. The SEALs advanced through the trees with their military dog in the lead. As the SEALs moved silently, the military dog dove into the thicket of trees and got into a struggle with an enemy fighter with a RPG who was left behind to ambush the SEALs. The dog tore into the fighter as the enemy insurgent yelled in pain. A DEVGRU sniper with his suppressed HK416 fired a few precise shots killing the enemy fighter without harming the dog. The SEALs moved further with their dog in the lead. One team of SEALs went further to the right flank to get a better flanking position thus creating a perfect L-formation thus would allow the SEALs to hit the Taliban group from both sides. The drone continued to sparkle the enemy fighter's location with its infrared laser. Thus allowing the SEALs to easily identify the fighters with their own infrared lasers and night vision goggles. The last remaining fighters had settled into a small perimeter and were lying there on the lip of a ditch waiting for the SEALs to approach. However, the Taliban fighters couldn't see the SEALs in the dark while the SEALs could see them. The first SEAL shots killed two insurgents. The SEALs infrared lasers danced around them as fighter after fighter dropped dead into the ditch. One fighter opened fire blindly with his AK-47 spraying their direction but the rounds sailed over the SEAL's heads. The SEALs fired several rounds into the shooter killing him. The SEALs after killing all the fighters moved forward and searched their bodies, collecting all the weapons and blowing them in place. While the SEALs cleared the bodies and weapons, the rest of the SEALs and Rangers secured the initial target. Once the American force of DEVGRU SEALs, Army rangers, and Afghan commandos completed their mission, they patrolled back to the compound and then back to the helicopters for extraction.

==== Death of Linda Norgrove, 8 October 2010 ====
Linda Norgrove, a British aid worker, and three Afghan colleagues were kidnapped by members of the Taliban in Kunar Province, eastern Afghanistan, on 26 September 2010. The three Afghan aid workers were released on 3 October 2010 while negotiations over Norgrove's release were ongoing. Signal intercepts and aerial ISR assets found Nosgrove in one of two Taliban hillside compounds in Korangal Valley and guarded by at least 6 insurgents. A troop from DEVGRU Silver squadron and two squads of U.S. Army Rangers of the 75th Ranger Regiment conducted a rescue attempt on at 0300 on 8 October 2010. A pair of Boeing MH-47E Chinooks covered by a Lockheed Martin AC-130U Spooky II Gunship and an armed MQ-1B Predator UAV, would have to insert the DEVGRU team directly on top of the target compound, due to the rocky terrain and lack of cover, the Rangers were inserted nearby to establish blocking positions and fire support positions overlooking the compound. The lead MH-47E arrived over the compound and the SEALs quickly fast roped to the ground, snipers from the second helicopter engaged and killed two guards with suppressed HK417, as the SEALs landed in the compound insurgents appeared from several small buildings and were immediately engaged, two were killed by an orbiting AC-130. The SEALs were then fired upon by an insurgent coming out of one of the buildings, fire was returned and the insurgent was killed, unknown to the SEALs the insurgent was dragging the hostage out of the building at the time and she received a gunshot wound to the leg, fearing more insurgents were in an area between two buildings, a SEAL operator threw a fragmentation grenade toward the area. The SEALs cleared the buildings, confirming all six insurgents killed, Nosgrove was found fatally wounded, initially it was thought she had been killed by an insurgent suicide bomb, only later did it emerge that the cause of her death was probably the SEAL grenade. In the after action reviews, the SEAL who threw the grenade did not admit to throwing it, until helmet camera footage was reviewed by the squadron commander, three operators were dismissed from the unit.

==== Afghanistan helicopter crash, 6 August 2011 ====
Fifteen members of DEVGRU's Gold Squadron "Golden Knights" were among the 38 killed on Saturday, 6 August 2011 in Maidan Wardak province, Afghanistan, when a Boeing CH-47D Chinook helicopter flown by B Company, 7th Battalion, 158th Aviation Regiment, was shot down by a Taliban-fired rocket-propelled grenade; the crash wiped out an entire troop. The personnel killed in the helicopter crash are said to have belonged to an "immediate reaction force" that were en route to intercept a group of Taliban who were escaping the area following an operation by United States Army Rangers. It was the largest single loss of U.S. life since the beginning of the 2001 Afghan War, and is the largest single loss ever suffered by the SEALs.

==== Ambushing the Taliban ====
After the helicopter crash on 6 August 2011. A number of the DEVGRU SEALs were devastated by this loss and tried to comfort each other. Right before thanksgiving, DEVGRU SEALs left for a deployment in Afghanistan - at Forward Operating Base Shank located up in the mountains to the east. In the dead of winter in Afghanistan, it was getting fiercely cold at an altitude of six thousand feet. After some time passed by, the intelligence personals had been going over film from one of their drones that were looking for targets. They notice a group of men in a little mountain village what they called MAM; military-age males- who were armed. These men had RPG rocket launchers. These men would load up their weapons and drive out of the village, winding through mountain passes on this miserable little road making their circuitous way to neighboring villages. They mistakenly thought by taking this remote road they wouldn't be seen. The intelligence personals saw that these Taliban insurgents developed a pattern and routine. The DEVGRU operatives made a plan, they knew these insurgent's pattern. The Taliban would load their car with weapons to drive out to their ambush spot on the side of the mountain. The SEALs would be waiting for them, staging an ambush of their own. The SEALs presented their ambush plan to the U.S. army commanders gaining approval. The SEALs inserted into the area where they would ambush the group of Taliban insurgents by flying out to the mountain and then hiking up to the spot. The DEVGRU operatives hid behind some rocks and set up their ambush. DEVGRU snipers climbed high on the mountain with their sniper rifles setting up overwatch. After waiting for some time, the insurgents in their car arrived. When the car got close enough, the SEALs came out of their hiding spot behind the rocks and formed a line on the road thus completely surprising the insurgents. The insurgent driver of the car braked and pushed his Nisan into reverse in panic. But the car got stuck in the snow. The passenger-side door slammed open and an insurgent hopped out holding a belt-fed machine gun. He ran toward the trunk. One of the DEVGRU SEALs fired and the Taliban machine gunner dropped dead. Almost at the same time, one of the DEVGRU snipers fired a headshot killing the driver. The other three Taliban insurgents in the backseat started scrambling for the exits and the line of SEALs on the road opened fire killing the rest of the insurgents. After the SEALs successfully ambushed and killed this group of five Taliban insurgents, they with some Afghan soldiers who accompanied them cleared the scene finding more belt-fed machine guns, AK-47s, and grenades.

==== Operation Jubilee ====
On 22 May 2012, British aid worker Helen Johnston, a Kenyan NGO worker and two Afghan guides were captured and held captive by bandits in Badakhshan Province, Afghanistan. The bandits offered their release in exchange for a ransom that included the release of a notorious drug dealer; with the threat that the kidnappers may sell the hostages to the Taliban (with whom they had already been in contact), coalition forces worked around the clock to locate them. Signal intercept teams got a fix on the kidnappers location, high altitude UAVs began constant pattern of live surveillance in an effort to establish exactly where the hostages being held, the number of kidnappers and their daily routes as well as approach routes for the SOF rescue teams. It was soon established that the hostages had been split up and were being held in two separate caves in the Koh-e-Laram forest, a joint British-US hostage rescue mission was planned. On 28 May 2012, the operation was carried out: two teams – one from the British Army 22nd Special Air Service Regiment (SAS) and one from U.S. Naval Special Warfare DEVGRU – were inserted by U.S. Army 160th SOAR "Nightstalker" Sikorsky MH-60M Blackhawk helicopters at an LZ 2 km from the target location, then the assault force advanced on foot through the forest and established a security cordon before assaulting the caves simultaneously. The SEALs assaulted and cleared one cave killing seven gunmen but didn't find any hostages. The SAS team assault on the other cave killed a further four gunmen and rescued all four hostages; none of the hostages or operators were harmed.

==== Rescue of Dr. Dilip Joseph, 8 December 2012 ====
On 8 December 2012, DEVGRU operators from Gold Squadron rescued Dilip Joseph, an American doctor held captive by the Taliban in Eastern Afghanistan. Dr. Joseph, who was working for an aid organization, was kidnapped along with two Afghan colleagues at a road block by armed men and were moved to a compound in Laghma Province. The two Afghans were later released after negotiations. When intelligence indicated Dr. Joseph was in imminent danger a rescue operation was mounted. A DEVGRU member involved in the rescue, Navy Petty Officer 1st Class Nicolas Checque, was killed. Checque was a highly decorated combat veteran awarded with the Bronze Star Medal with Valor and the Purple Heart as well as the Navy Cross posthumously awarded following the mission, among many others. Senior Chief Naval Special Warfare Operator Edward C. Byers received the Medal of Honor on 29 February 2016, for his actions during the rescue. As Dr. Dilip Joseph was being held hostage by the Taliban, DEVGRU was prepared to stage a raid to rescue the doctor. After the American intelligence personnel gathered and analyzed information. The DEVGRU operators were prepared for the hostage rescue. The DEVGRU SEALs inserted by helicopter. And hiked to their target compound. The point man Petty officer Checque raised his hand ordering the DEVGRU team to freeze as an insurgent guard slowly walked around the side of the compound. The guard spotted the SEALs and sprinted toward the main door. With the element of surprise compromised, the SEALs rushed to the door. Petty Officer Checque shouldered his HK416 assault rifle and took a shot at the guard. Checque crashed through the door as Chief Byers and the rest of the SEAL squad followed only seconds behind him. As Checque burst through the makeshift door, a Taliban guard let loose a burst of his AK-47 assault rifle and a round struck Checque in the head. Chief Byers pushed his way through and fired at the Taliban guard killing the guard with a headshot instantly. Chief Byers then saw a man race toward the corner of the room. Byers rushed forward and tackled the unknown man against the wall thus maintaining control over him while reaching up to adjust his night-vision goggles to allow close-up focus. The rest of the DEVGRU team burst into the room and began to call out to Dr. Joseph, asking him to identify himself. After Chief Byers had his goggles refocused, he realized the man he pinned was a Taliban insurgent. So Byers dispatched him with two quick shots to the body and one to the head. Dr. Dilip Joepsh called out identifying himself. Byers sprinted over to Dr. Joseph and used his own body to shield him. Looking up, Byers saw another guard directly behind the doctor. But he was out of position to take a shot and so Byers reached up and grabbed the man around the throat, pinning him against the wall. Moments later, one of the SEAL teammates killed the pinned enemy fighter with two precision shots. After all the guards were neutralized by the SEALs, they took Dr. Dilip Joseph and wounded member Checque to the extraction point. A Black Hawk arrived. The SEAL team with their wounded member Checque and the rescued hostage boarded the helicopter and began the forty-minute flight back to Bagram Air Base. The SEALs tried to keep Checque alive but he died from his wound en route.

=== Operation Freedom's Sentinel ===
By the end of 2014, U.S. and NATO forces withdrew from Afghanistan-concluding Operation Enduring Freedom - Afghanistan, the following year, US operations within Afghanistan continued under the codename: Operation Freedom's Sentinel.

==== Attempted rescue of American and Australian hostages in Afghanistan, August 2016 ====
On 7 August 2016, an American and an Australian professor working at the American University of Afghanistan in Kabul, were kidnapped; CNN reported that a few days later operators from SEAL Team Six's Silver Squadron attempted to rescue them. The operators parachuted (HALO jump) into Afghanistan, but failed to find them at the location they searched, however, the BBC reported that no US service personnel or civilians were harmed and a number of "hostile forces" were killed. The US was never certain the professors were at the site, or if they were, when they had been moved. Some electronic media was recovered indicating the identities of those who were holding them.

=== Personnel recovery from aircraft crash site ===
DEVGRU was also involved in the recovery of US personnel killed when a US Bombardier E-11A jet crashed in mountainous territory in eastern Afghanistan, 27 January 2020.

=== 2021 Kabul Airlift ===
DEVGRU was also involved in the evacuation of US citizens and venerable Afghans during the US withdrawal from Afghanistan at the Hamid Karzai international airport in August 2021.

== Operation Iraqi Freedom ==
=== Objective Beaver ===
During the 2003 invasion of Iraq, at the start of the Iraq War, a squadron from DEVGRU operated as part of Task Force 20, their role was to conduct heliborne direct action raids - particularly against HVTs. On the evening of 26 March 2003, a DEVGRU assault element supported by B Company, 2nd Battalion, 75th Ranger Regiment at a complex known as al Qadisiyah Research Centre - codenamed Objective Beaver - that intelligence indicated that chemical and biological weapons stocks may have been located along the shore of the al Qadisiyah reservoir among government and residential buildings, assaulted the complex (codenamed Objective Beaver). Whilst the first of four MH-60Ks inserted the Rangers into their blocking positions, it was engaged by small arms fire from a nearby building, an AH-6M spotted the muzzle flashes and fired a 2.75inch rocket into the location silencing the small arms fire, the second MH-60K was also struck by small arms fire but its door gunner suppressed it. USAF A-10A Thunderbolt II "Warthogs" engaged nearby electricity transformers successfully blacking out the area, but it resulted in a series of explosions and a resulting fire at the stations that dramatically lit the sky - pinpointing the orbiting helicopters from enemy gunmen. Small arms fire increased as the final two MH-60s inserted their blocking teams, the two pairs of AH-6M Little Birds and MH-60L Direct Action Penetrator Blackhawks, supporting the mission continued to suppress targets as the four MH-47E Chinooks carrying the DEVGRU main assault force inserted under heavy enemy small arms fire whilst DEVGRU sniper teams aboard a pair of MH-6M Little Birds engaged numerous gunmen and vehicles. The SEALs conducted a hasty SSE while the Ranger blocking positions received and returned fire, the AH-6Ms and the aerial snipers continued to engage enemy gunmen whilst the DAPs pushed further out to ensure no reinforcements approached - engaging and destroying numerous Fedayeen armed technicals. The SSE took longer than expected owing to the size and maze-like structure of the building, the mission completed after 45 minutes, later tests of the material recovered by DEVGRU showed no evidence of chemical or biological weapons at the Objective Beaver, one Nightstalker crew from an MH-47E and one Ranger was wounded.

=== Rescue of Private Jessica Lynch ===
On 1 April 2003, around 60 SEALs from DEVGRU Gold Squadron successfully rescued PFC Jessica Lynch from a hospital in An'Nasiriyah.

=== Operation Snake Eyes ===
During the occupation, they were stationed at Al Asad Airbase as part of Task Force West/Blue. In 2005, DEVGRU along with Delta force and other regular Army and Marine forces took part in Operation Snake Eyes: an operation aimed at taking down local militant networks, especially against Al-Qaeda in Iraq, eliminating the groups from top to bottom, with particular focus on the "middle men". The operation took place all across Iraq, raids were synchronised with ground-holding regular Army and Marine forces; when Delta Force took a number of casualties during that year, at least 3 DEVGRU Operators who were deployed to Afghanistan were seconded to Delta after they requested additional assaulters.

=== Battle of Ramadi ===
During the Second Battle of Ramadi, DEVGRU operators from Task Force Blue and Delta Force operators from Task Force Green mounted take down operations against al-Qaeda targets based on high-level intelligence.

=== Raid on compounds in January 2006 ===
In January 2006, a DEVGRU SEAL team flew to Al Asad Air base in far western Iraq, about 75 miles from the Syrian border. The SEALs thought of a non-complicated tactic of effectively raiding or assaulting insurgent bases. The SEALs would land some distance away, far enough so that the people at the target couldn't hear the choppers. Then the SEALs would walk their way in and blow the doors, then sneak into the house in total silence. The DEVGRU SEAL team that would go on this raid would be accompanied by United States Army Rangers and a British Special Boat Service operative. Later intelligence came up with three major compounds filled with terrorists all in the same area. It would be a joint operations with United States Army Special Forces and other British troops. The SEALs were going to land five clicks away, and walk in because the terrorist insurgents wouldn't hear them. The SEALs could sneak into the target compounds. After the SEALs landed at their remote spot in the pitch dark and began their hike. While the SEALs were advancing, the U.S. Army Special Forces and British forces who did not want to walk in quietly came in on loud helicopters to land on the X. This increased the probability that the insurgents would know they were coming. The DEVGRU snipers and ladder carriers sprinted to the nearest roofline to get up high. The SEALs moved on to their objective- each unit had one of the compounds- going in and going dark, using the new tactic. The SEALs placed a charge on the door and blew it open. The DEVGRU SEALs entered quietly and found themselves in a long hallway. The SEALs and the British SBS operative moved their way forward in usual CQB formation. An insurgent with an AK-47 pointed right at the SEALs popped out of a doorway. The SEALs looked back at him with their night vision goggles. The insurgent couldn't see the SEALs in the dark. The insurgent went back behind the door. The British SBS operative and a DEVGRU SEAL entered and pushed through the door. The SEAL shot dead the insurgent. Two other DEVGRU SEALs left the building and encountered two more insurgents. The two SEALs opened fire killing the two insurgents. The SEALs cleared another building. Then they gave medical aid to a wounded terrorist who threw away his gun and was wounded in the leg. The DEVGRU snipers opened fire toward a nearby mosque where the terrorists had fled. A SEAL opened fire at a fleeing insurgent who fled in the mosque not knowing if he hit him. The SEALs then turned to the U.S. Army Rangers for help. An Army Ranger carrying a Carl Gustaf went into position while another U.S. Ranger followed him carrying the rockets for the Carl Gustaf. The Army Ranger with the Carl Gustaf fired two rockets into the mosque where the terrorist insurgents had fled. The bodies of the insurgents were flung everywhere as the rockets hit them. After the successful raid. The DEVGRU SEALs, Army Rangers, and the British SBS operators returned to base.

=== Clearing a village in Iraq ===
The DEVGRU SEALs conducted a mission in summer 2006 in Iraq. The American drone pilots reported seeing a half dozen men sleeping outside in a village. After the DEVGRU operatives were inserted, the SEALs closed slowly on the village just before three in the morning. The SEALs continued to move in the darkness with their night vision goggles. The DEVGRU SEALs had drones to give them eyes in the sky and an AC-130 gunship to cover them in case of needed immediate air support. The SEALs finally found the sleeping terrorist fighters in ten bedrolls. A pair of enemy sentries stood scanning the desert. Even though the enemy sentries had no night vision capabilities, they may still have sensed danger possibly by hearing the AC-130 gunship overhead. One of the sentries moved over to where the other insurgents were still sleeping and began waking them up. The insurgents got up slowly and started looking around. The enemy sentries walked toward the nearest house. The other started to follow. None of the insurgents were carrying guns, so the SEALs couldn't open fire by the rules of engagements. Before the SEALs could move forward in the dark, the insurgents came back to their bedrolls and grabbed AK-47 rifles, RPGs, and a belt-fed PKM machine gun. The SEALs aimed with their infrared lasers in on the chests of the fighters as the DEVGRU snipers on overwatch opened fire. Seconds later, three of the insurgents were shot dead. The other insurgents panicked and started running back toward the village. Suppressed rounds from the SEAL's weapon continued to pour on them. The SEALs counted five dead insurgents. While one group of SEALs stayed behind to provide cover, another group of SEALs silently and slowly advanced. As the group of SEALs that advanced were moving forward, four more insurgents sprinted back to their bedrolls in a futile attempt to retrieve their weapons. The SEALs aiming with their infrared lasers on their sound suppressed weapons opened fire killing all four insurgents. The SEALs moved forward again clearing house after house. In one of the houses, a SEAL caught a glimpse of a man peering out of a door. The muzzle of the man's AK-47 rifle could be seen. Another SEAL armed with a sound suppressed Mp7 fired several shots at the insurgent's head killing the insurgent. Outside, two enemy fighters ran through the village and tried to hide by running out into the opening desert. They were easily spotted by the AC-130 gunship. A team of four DEVGRU SEALs and a combat dog raced out of the village after the fighters. The AC-130's guns fired on the two insurgents killing them both. One of the SEALs inside a house spotted a child who was frightened by the firefight. The SEAL tried to comfort the child with a glowstick and jolly rancher candy. The SEAL assured the child that he had nothing to fear. The SEAL took the child's hand and escorted him to where all the women and children were being held. The child reunited with all the women and children who were all unharmed were where they were safely gathered. The SEAL who escorted the child then reunited with his fellow SEALs to assess the scene after they had successfully eliminated all the insurgents. The SEALs had suffered no casualties in this successful mission.

=== Further operations in Iraq ===
In December 2006, DEVGRU operators were carrying out missions in Western Iraq: working along the border with Syria and in Ar'Ramadi, targeting high-level couriers that brought in foreign fighters and Iranian weapons and also assisting US Marines in clearing and securing series of houses near the Syrian border.

=== Raid on 3 separate houses in Iraq in 2007 ===
The DEVGRU SEALs were given another mission of raiding three separate adjacent houses. Three of the three DEVGRU SEAL teams would be working together. The SEALs could potentially take out an entire cell with one operation if they acted fast. The SEALs would land on X in a faster way. After the SEALs landed, a group of DEVGRU operatives ran about 25 feet to the door of their target house. The SEALs set the charge on the door and blew it open. The impact of the breaching charge killed a female insurgent who was carrying an AK-47. The SEALs went in to clear the house. A DEVGRU SEAL advanced toward the bedroom after clearing the kitchen. The SEAL carefully scanned the room. He spotted another insurgent with an AK-47. The insurgent had 3 children with him. The SEAL in the dark with his night vision goggles fired two precise shots at the insurgent and killed him without harming the children. The SEAL took the three children into the kitchen and his interpreter translated the conversation. It turned out the dead female insurgent terrorist and male insurgent terrorist were parents of the three children. The children said their aunt lived in a house across the small field out the back door. So the SEAL told the children to get their shoes and they complied. The DEVGRU SEAL shouldered his gun so he wouldn't scare them. The SEAL personally escorted the three children in the middle of a volatile gunfight to the aunt's house. The SEAL put the kids in front of the door and backed into the shadows. A woman came to the door and spoke for a second before bringing them in. The children turned around and waved at the SEAL before going into their aunt's house. The DEVGRU SEAL reunited with his fellow SEALs. A group of DEVGRU SEALs cleared the building of the secondary target killing two enemy insurgents, arresting two more, who were being interrogated by the Tactical Questioning Team. Two rooms away, other SEALs uncovered a fighting age male in a hiding hole in the wall. The insurgent attempted to fire on them but the SEALs quickly killed him before he could fire. The SEALs rolled up all of the men and left all of the women and children behind. Before the SEALs withdrew, they told the women not to leave their houses until the sun was up. The SEALs explained that their aircraft would remain in the area, and that the SEALs didn't want them to be mistaken for insurgent reinforcements. The SEALs killed seven Al-Qaeda fighters and captured two thus removing nine more insurgents off the battlefield in this successful night raid.

=== Heliborne raid on safehouse in Iraq ===
U.S. Army Special Forces had hit a convoy of enemy insurgents that included too many vehicles for them to handle. Two of the enemy cars got away. Assets in the sky and the U.S. Air Force was able to watch and follow the vehicles to their safe house. Both vehicles parked, and five insurgents went into one of three adjacent houses. Back at the American/Coalition base at Baghdad Airport, the American/Coalition commanders considered the decision of sending an assault team to raid the safehouse that the five terrorist insurgents fled to and possibly capture a prisoner. Since the U.S. Army Special Forces killed all of the other insurgents when they engaged the previous enemy convoy. A British SAS officer agreed with the other commanders that DEVGRU SEALs should be sent in on this raid. The British SAS officer requested to the DEVGRU SEALs to make sure that they capture an enemy prisoner alive and bring him back to base for interrogation. After intelligence personal in the Joint operations Center(JOC) kept eyes on the target, the SEALs decided to fly in and land right in front. The DEVGRU SEALs chose a landing spot a hundred meters from the front door. The SEALs would drop in by helicopter, kill four of the insurgents, capture the fifth insurgent as a prisoner, and then fly back to base. The SEALs took off in three Black Hawks and flew to the houses where the insurgents were hiding out. While the Black Hawks were hovering near the ground at the houses. The insurgents heard them coming and opened fire. The SEALs in the helicopters returned fire from the air. When the helos hit the ground, the SEAL teams jumped out. Because of the cover of darkness and night vision capability, the SEALs were able to kill three of the enemy fighters while the other two split and ran into separate houses. While a small team were inspecting the bodies of the three killed insurgents. One team of DEVGRU SEALs went into one house while another team went into the other. In one of the houses, a team of DEVGRU SEALs were guided by their military dog. The SEALs cleared the house and their dog led them into the bathroom. In the middle of the bathroom, there was a small bathtub-looking basin. It was built into the floor and was serving as the drain right below a showerhead. The SEAL dog scratched it violently and barked at the drain. The SEALs thought it was strange so they backed the dog off safely. Two SEALs stood on either side of the tub with their guns pointing at it keeping as low and away as they could, lifted the basin. As they did, bullets had exploded out of the tub. Fortunately for the SEALs, none of them got hit. The two SEALs fired six shots each into the bathtub basin. After a few seconds, the DEVGRU SEALs lifted the tub out of the floor. Beneath it was a dug-out cavity and a dead insurgent in it with machine guns and hand grenades. The SEALs in the other house captured the fifth insurgent unharmed without firing a shot. The DEVGRU operatives loaded up the enemy weapons and incriminating documents. And then the SEALs extracted by helicopters and brought the prisoner back to Baghdad Airport.

=== Raiding a peninsula in Iraq ===
The DEVGRU SEALs were given another mission as intelligence personnels coordinated information on new targets for them. There was an Al-Qaeda cell of IED makers on a small peninsula north of Baghdad called Baqubah. This group had chosen their hideout wisely. The Americans did not want to call in an airstrike on this location as there were too many women and children on this small peninsula. So the DEVGRU operatives would be sent in to eliminate this Al-Qaeda cell. There was a total of nineteen terrorists of this cell on this peninsula. The SEALs decided to bring in their whole crew. Seventeen DEVGRU SEALs, two U.S. military dogs, and a few enablers would infiltrate the peninsula. At night, the DEVGRU SEALs and their military dogs successfully infiltrated the peninsula. The SEAL's plan was to enter the buildings simultaneously and silently. However, the plan didn't last long. An enemy sentry on top of a structure spotted the SEALs and fired on them. The SEALs took cover. Then the SEALs entered the buildings and engaged the Al-Qaeda fighters. The SEALs lurked in the darkness with their night vision goggles killing unsuspecting terrorists, eliminating terrorists using good CQB tactics, or outflanked them using sophisticated maneuvers. There were many women and children mingled with a number of the terrorists, but the DEVGRU SEALs were able to eliminate the terrorists without inflicting injury on the women and children with excellent precision. After the SEALs cleared the peninsula, they made their counting. The seventeen SEALs and their two military dogs took no casualties while killing all nineteen terrorists. Not one woman, child, or unarmed civilian was harmed. The DEVGRU SEALs after raiding this peninsula left the area. The next day, the locals who had been terrorized by this Al-Qaeda cell for four years realized that all their oppressors were dead. The SEALs could see the people's reaction because they had aircraft circling overhead, watching in case any more insurgents showed up to bury the dead. But there were no more insurgents, just a big celebration. The party was so big with all of these jubilant people drinking and dancing in the street, that a newspaper in Baghdad sent a reporter up there. He asked "who did this? Who came last night?" The women responded "Ninjas and they came with lions." This was the headline the next day in Baghdad.

== Operation Enduring Freedom – Horn of Africa ==
As part of OEF-HOA, Naval Special Warfare Unit 10 are deployed to Camp Lemonnier, Djibouti, under the command of SOCCE-HOA (Special Operations Command and Control Element-Horn of Africa) which commands all SOCOM units assigned to training or operational missions in the region. Special operations carried out in Somalia are conducted under the codename: Operation Octave Dune, as part of the overall effort in Somalia, which is known as Operation Octave Shield. Before Djibouti became the epicentre for counter terrorism operations in Africa, unilateral operations were launched from temporary forward locations in friendly nations such as Kenya, or from US Navy Ships.

=== Maersk Alabama hijacking and rescue, 12 April 2009 ===
MV Maersk Alabama, a 508 foot long cargo ship carrying 17,000 tons of humanitarian aid supplies, was seized by pirates 240 nautical miles off the coast of Somalia, in waters notorious for piracy. After a confrontation with the crew, four of the hijackers fled in the ship's lifeboat, taking Captain Richard Phillips with them as hostage and resulting in a stand-off with a group US Navy warships including, USS Bainbridge DDG-96, USS Halyburton FFG-40, and USS Boxer LHD-4. DEVGRU operators from Red Squadron flew non-stop from Virginia to the Horn of Africa, then parachuted into the water, before finally arriving aboard the Bainbridge. Three of the operators, one for each pirate, took up sniper positions on the fantail of the ship, with presidential authorization to use lethal force if it was required. The leader of the pirate group was lured onto the USS Bainbridge under the assumption that his group's leaders were aboard the ship and negotiations were going to be held. However, shortly after boarding the ship, SEALs and Navy personnel disarmed the assailant. He would later stand trial in the U.S. for piracy. At one point, following a struggle between the pirates and Capt. Phillips where shots were fired, the SEALs felt the hostage's life was in imminent danger. When the first opportunity appeared and the heads of all three captors were visible at the same time, all three snipers fired simultaneously, killing all three pirates at once with head-shots. Phillips was then successfully rescued, bringing the stand-off to an end.

=== Operation Celestial Balance, 14 September 2009 ===
Operation Celestial Balance is one example of such a mission: the target was the member of the east African al-Qaeda cell responsible for the 1998 United States embassy bombings and he was involved in bombing of a Kenyan hotel resort, he was the facilitator between al-Qaeda and al-Shabaab. After collecting information on the target and his location, CIA and JSOC planners presented President Obama with 4 options: a Tomahawk cruise missile strike, an airstrike, an attack by Little Bird helicopters or an attempt to capture the target with an assault force of SEALs. Obama picked the airstrike option, however on the day of the operation a USMC Boeing AV-8B Harrier II+ approached its release point it reported a malfunction in its targeting system; so 8 helicopters (4 AH-6M Little Birds and 4 MH-60L Blackhawks) were sent in, piloted by members of the 160th SOAR "Nightstalkers" carrying a team of SEAL Operators from DEVGRU. The AH-6s strafed the two-vehicle convoy, killing the target and 3 Al'Shabaab terrorists, the MH-60s dropped off the DEVGRU operators who cleared the vehicles and recovered the body. The DEVGRU operators placed the bodies of the four terrorists in body bags and loaded them onto their helicopters. The DEVGRU operators then extracted onto the helicopters and returned to their naval vessels.

=== SY Quest Rescue ===
On 18 February 2011, the SY Quest was seized by 19 Somali pirates around 190 to 240 miles off of the coast of Oman. The pirates attempted to sail the yacht toward Puntland, Somalia, but were intercepted several days later by the USS Enterprise, USS Leyte Gulf, USS Sterett, and USS Bulkeley. The hostages kidnapped on the SY Quest were Phillip Macay, Robert Riggle, and the owners, Jean and Scott Adam. The pirates issued a statement for ransome. DEVGRU Gold Squadron was alerted and launched from their base to then night jump into the Indian Ocean. On the Enterprise, SEALs proceeded with opening negotiations with the pirates with an FBI hostage negotiator on board, at which time two of the pirates, intending to negotiate boarded the Sterett on 21 February. Negotiations continued into the following morning. 22 February while negotiations were still taking place, a pirate aboard the SY Quest fired a rocket propelled grenade at the Sterett from 600 yards away but it missed. Almost immediately afterward gunfire was heard and flashes were seen at the bottom windows of the yacht. A group of SEAL snipers watched helplessly as the pirates began to open fire. Through their scopes, SEALs could plainly see American hostages being executed by the pirates. In an attempt to save who they could, Admiral William McRaven ordered Lt. Cmdr. SEAL Jonas Kelsall and his men of Gold Squadron to immediately board the SY Quest. When SEALS boarded the yacht, they found two pirates already killed by small arms fire. As they went below deck a brief firefight ensued where two pirates were killed, one by rifle fire and the other with a leatherman tool. While clearing the bottom of the yacht a pirate faked being dead and jumped onto the back of the pointman, SEAL Heath Robinson was the second guy in the stack and knew he couldn't shoot the pirate, so he pulled out a blade and slashed his throat. Thirteen pirates surrendered in the process and were taken into custody. The SEALs found Phyllis Macay and Robert Riggle and the SY Quest's owners, Jean and Scott Adam. All four hostages had been shot by their captors and were grievously wounded, but still alive. Despite attempts to save their lives, all four hostages died of their wounds.

=== The Capture of Ahmed Abdulkadir Warsame ===
The United States had been in a relentless pursuit of Warsame for some time. After JSOC and American intelligence determined when and where Warsame would be by tracking his cell phone and analyzing information provided by local spies, a snatch and grab operation was considered. Intelligence indicated that Warsame would be traveling with a single associate in international body of water. He would not have a contingent of heavily armed body guards with him. DEVGRU operators from Silver Squadron were prepared to capture Warsame and bring him in. Ever since the successful mission of Operation Celestial Balance, the Obama administration knew it would eventually be faced with the opportunity to capture a high-value terrorist. After months of debate, planning, and legal wrangling. The mission to capture Warsame was authorized. Next, at dusk on 19 April 2011. Warsame was finally in the international waters in his boat with just his associate. DEVGRU operatives utilized a disguised vessel to approach Warsame's fishing boat in the Gulf of Aden. The operators were hidden behind the decoy vessel in specialized boats, and marksmen were placed on a nearby vessel as overwatch. The SEALs approached Warsame's boat undetected, boarded, and subdued Warsame and his associate. The operators transported Warsame and his associate to the USS Boxer. The mission of capturing Ahmed Abdulkadir Warsame was completed without a single shot being fired.

=== Operation Octave Fusion ===
In a mission codenamed Octave Fusion, on 24 January 2012, operators from DEVGRU Blue squadron, successfully rescued American Jessica Buchanan, 32, and Dane Poul Hagen Thisted, 60, who had been detained by Somali bandits in north-central Somalia. The pair had been abducted around the area of Galkayo three months earlier while working as aid workers helping to remove land mines. Officials stated plans for a rescue operation had been under development for weeks, but acted after discovering that Buchanan's health was deteriorating due to an undisclosed illness. DEVGRU was prepared to capture the hostage takers but this proved unfeasible and nine "heavily armed" kidnappers were killed. The SEALs were parachuted in at night before advancing two miles to the enemy compound on foot. After securing the safety of Buchanan and Thisted, the team, who suffered no injuries, were extracted by helicopter.

=== Training with the French DGSE for the Bulo Marer hostage rescue attempt ===
In preparation for the Bulo Marer hostage rescue attempt, a small team of Operators from Red Squadron DEVGRU, trained with operators from the DGSE Action Division who carried out the rescue attempt.

=== Operation against Al-Shabaab in Barawa, 5 October 2013 ===
On 5 October 2013, United States Navy DEVGRU operators from Red Squadron launched a raid against a beachside house primarily to capture a key member of Al-Shabaab, called Abdulkadir Mohamed Abdulkadir, known as "Ikrima", and to gain intelligence. The SEALs approached the beach from several small boats. 20 SEALs then moved inland, roughly 200 metres towards a two-story building which was confirmed the location of the Al Shabaab commander. The SEALs split into two teams, six SEALs then entered the house while the rest stayed outside to provide a security perimeter. During this time, an Al Shabaab fighter walked out for a cigarette and spotted them and a firefight broke out. SEALs inside the house killed one fighter but chose to withdraw without capturing Ikrima due to an increased number of women and children in the immediate area.

== War in North-West Pakistan ==
In late 2005, an operation was planned for infiltrating into Pakistan after CIA intelligence was received that indicated al-Zawahiri was attending a meeting in a compound close to the border. They were to parachute in from MC-130H Combat Talon IIs and steer across the Pakistani border from Afghanistan, capture or kill the targets and be extracted by U.S. Air Force Special Operations Command 20th Special Operations Squadron "Green Hornets" Sikorsky MH-53M Pave Low IV Helicopters. However, as the MC-130s were airborne the mission was aborted; in 2022, a CIA MQ-1B Predator UAV strike in the same area nearly killed Zawahiri.

=== Objective Cottonmouth ===
In the fall of 2005, SEAL Team 6 was given a mission to raid an objective in Pakistan. A Gold Squadron troop of DEVGRU infiltrated across the border toward a compound they had named Objective Cottonmouth near the village of Dandi Sedgai in North Waziristan. The targets were Al Qaeda facilitators that intelligence suggested would be meeting at the compound. The raid turned into a significant firefight. The SEALs killed at least six or eight militants. One SEAL was shot in the calf. The wound forced him to medically retire. Another SEAL operator was shot in the head. Fortunately for him, he was wearing a helmet. His helmet deflected the round, but the force of impact flipped him over, injuring his ankle. The SEALs captured four men. The SEALs then extracted back to friendly lines in Afghanistan by Chinooks with their four prisoners. After a few weeks, the four captives gave up intelligence that allowed the United States to target Al Qaeda’s third in command, Abu Hamza Rabia. On 1 December 2005, a CIA drone killed Rabia and at least one other militant in the village of Asoray, near Miram Shah.

=== Vigilant Harvest ===
In March 2006, DEVGRU and the US Army Rangers crossed into Pakistani territory in their hunt for al-Qaeda leaders, allegedly under the codename: Operation Vigilant Harvest. Their target was an al-Qaeda training camp in North Waziristan, they were flown in by the 160th SOAR "Nightstalkers", the operation has been falsely credited to the Pakistani Special Service Group. The SEALs and the Rangers killed as many as 30 terrorists, including the Chechen camp commandant Imam Asad.

=== Angur Ada Raid ===
In 2008, DEVGRU blue squadron carried out the Angur Ada raid, targeting unspecified al-Qaeda leadership targets, a number of terrorists were killed but no high-value targets were killed. After the SEALs completed their raid, the SEALs extracted in two MH-60 Black Hawks taking a few detainees with them.

=== Death of Osama bin Laden ===
Diagram of Osama bin Laden's hideout in Abbottabad, Pakistan. He was killed there on 2 May 2011.

On 1–2 May 2011 DEVGRU's Red Squadron undertook the covert operation codenamed Operation Neptune Spear, under the CIA's authority, and killed Osama bin Laden, leader of the terrorist organization Al Qaeda, at his compound 34°10′9.51″N 73°14′32.78″E in the city of Abbottabad, 113 kilometres (70 mi) from Islamabad, the Federal capital of Pakistan. The attack itself lasted 38 minutes. Bin Laden's adult son, a woman, and two couriers were also killed. There were no casualties to the team. They had practiced the mission "on both American coasts" and in a segregated section of Camp Alpha at Bagram Airfield, Afghanistan in early April 2011, using a 1 acre (0.40 ha) replica of bin Laden's compound. Modified MH-60 helicopters from the U.S. Army's 160th Special Operations Aviation Regiment Airborne "Nightstalkers" carried DEVGRU "Red Squadron" operators and paramilitary operatives from the CIA's Special Activities Division. Other personnel supported with tactical signals, intelligence collectors, and navigators using highly classified hyperspectral imagers from Ghazi Air Base in Pakistan.

Because of its covert nature, the raid was a CIA operation with DEVGRU being transferred under CIA authority for its duration. A 1 May memo from CIA Director Leon Panetta thanked the National Security Agency and the National Geospatial-Intelligence Agency, whose mapping and pattern-recognition software was likely used to determine that there was "high probability" that Bin Laden lived in the compound. Members of these agencies were paired with JSOC units in forward-deployed fusion cells to "exploit and analyze" battlefield data instantly using biometrics, facial recognition systems, voice print databases, and predictive models of insurgent behavior based on surveillance and computer-based pattern analysis. The operation was a result of years of intelligence work that included the capture of Khalid Sheikh Mohammed (KSM), the tracking of the courier to the Abbottabad compound by CIA paramilitary operatives, and the establishing of a CIA safe house that provided critical ground intelligence. On the first anniversary of the killing of Osama bin Laden the Combating Terrorism Center released documents seized from Osama bin Laden's Abbottabad home. The Associated Press reported that the troops had been trained to search for documents, computer files and "pocket litter" "that might produce leads to other terrorists".

In popular culture, several books have tried to capture the events of the mission. The first of which was the 2011 graphic novel published by IDW Publishing, Code Word: Geronimo, written by retired Marine Corps Captain Dale Dye and Julia Dye, and illustrated by former U.S. Army combat medic Gerry Kissell. Later, the controversial book Seal Target Geronimo, by Chuck Pfarrer, a former Navy SEAL, that disputed the accounts by the DoD of how the events occurred the night of the raid on the compound. Finally, in 2012, the book No Easy Day was released. The book was written by a DEVGRU Red Squadron operator writing under the pseudonym "Mark Owen", who was part of Operation Neptune Spear and claimed to be one of the two operators who engaged Bin Laden. Then, in 2012, a film directed by Kathryn Bigelow and written by Mark Boal was released called Zero Dark Thirty. The film portrayed the hunt for Osama Bin Laden and the raid performed by DEVGRU. Another film, Seal Team Six: The Raid on Osama Bin Laden, depicting the events of Operation Neptune Spear, was also released in 2012. The events in the film have neither been "confirmed nor denied" by White House officials..

For the operation, President Barack Obama awarded the unit the Presidential Unit Citation.

== Al-Qaeda insurgency in Yemen ==
=== Hostage Rescue operation, Hajr al-Sayar district - Yemen, 26 November 2014 ===
A U.S. official confirmed that about two dozen U.S. special operations forces and a team of Yemeni counterterrorism troops conducted a raid near the border with Saudi Arabia that rescued six Yemenis, a Saudi and an Ethiopian. Eight militants were killed during the operation.

=== Yakla raid, 29 January 2017 ===
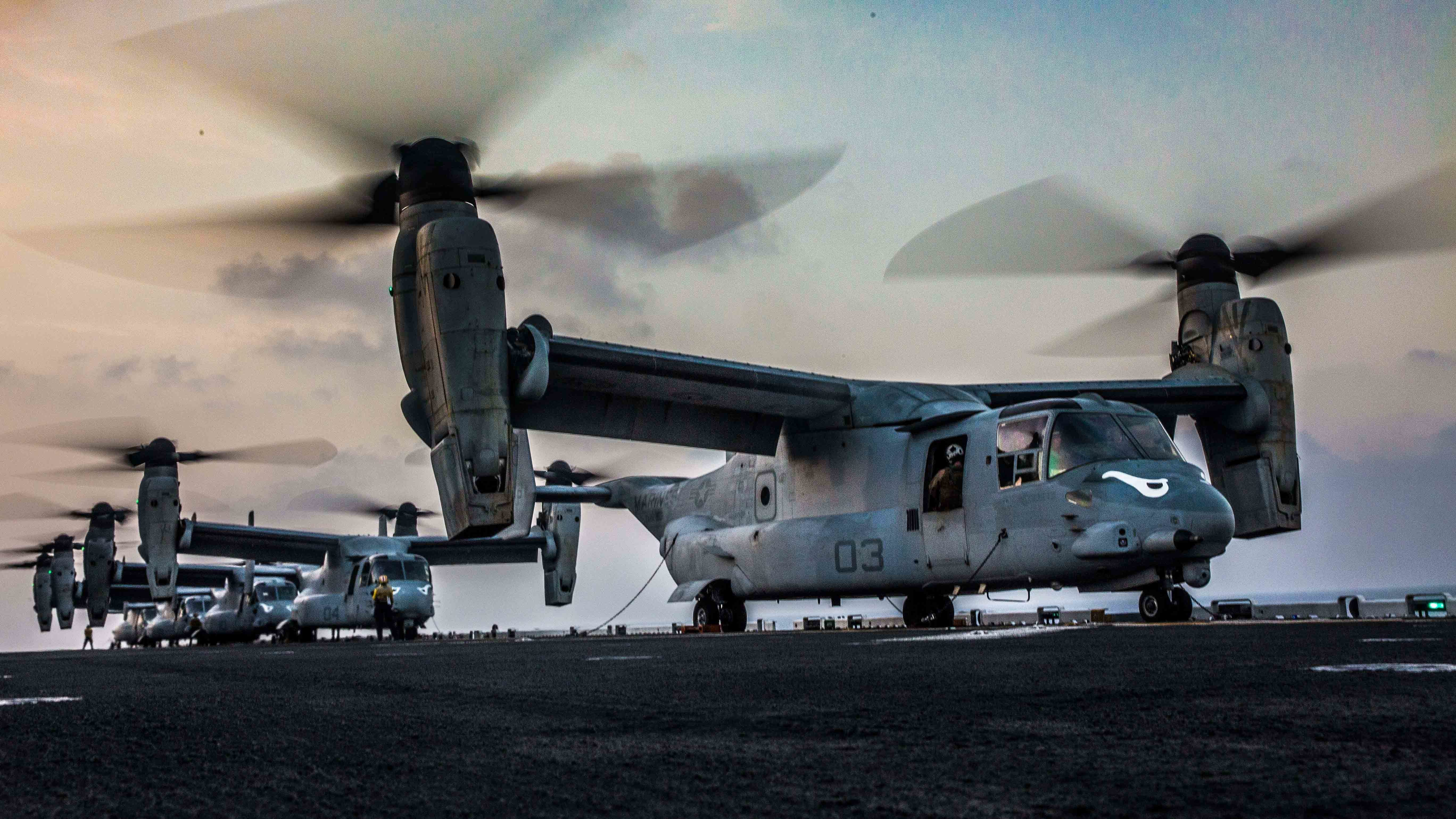
U.S. Marine MV-22 Ospreys on the amphibious assault ship USS Makin Island, 21 December 2016.

On 29 January 2017, the New York Times reported that SEALs from SEAL Team Six carried out the surprise dawn attack on an AQAP headquarters in Bayda Province that a senior American official said counterterrorism officials had deemed valuable enough to warrant a ground operation rather than an airstrike. However, based on eyewitness statements the element of surprise was (partially) lost after residents of the targeted location heard the sound of unmanned aerial vehicles several hours before US ground forces arrived (but allegedly did not expect a ground raid). The US military stated the raid led to "the capture of information that will likely provide insight into the planning of future terror plots." Reuters reported that the raid began with a drone attack on the home of Abdulraoof al-Dhahab, followed by the arrival of paratroopers. According to this account, corroborated among residents, a Yemeni security official, and a local official, "helicopters bombed the [al Qaeda] gunmen and a number of homes and led to a large number of casualties." A senior American official said a USMC MV-22B Osprey that was sent from USS Makin Island (LHD-8) to evacuate the wounded troops in the raid crash-landed nearby, leaving two more service members injured. American forces intentionally destroyed the aircraft with further airstrikes. The DEVGRU SEALs successfully extracted and departed the area after completing their raid.

The raid killed three prominent members of Al Qaeda: Abdulraoof al-Dhahab, Sultan al-Dhahab and Seif al-Nims The US military estimated that 14 Qaeda fighters were killed in the raid, that women were among the Qaeda fighters killed and injured, and that "the SEALs saw the women running to fighting positions as the team approached." According to medical reports, eight women and seven children, aged 3 to 13, were killed in the raid. U.S. citizen Nawar al-Awlaki, the eight-year-old daughter of Al Qaeda preacher Anwar al-Awlaki, killed in a 2011 drone strike, was among those killed. The US military initially denied there were any civilian casualties, but later declared it was investigating if they occurred. One SEAL was killed (Chief Petty Officer William "Ryan" Owens) and three others were injured.

=== Al Hathla raid, 23 May 2017 ===
The New York Times reported that on 23 May 2017, members of SEAL Team 6 carried out a raid on an AQAP-linked compound in Ma'rib Governorate. Colonel John Thomas, a CENTCOM spokesman, said that the raid was "intended to seize potentially important information from the compound - typically electronic devices such as computers, hard drives and cellphones - and was not an attempt to kill or capture a particular individual." The raid resulted in the killing of 7 AQAP militants by what a CENTCOM statement said was "through a combination of small-arms fire and precision airstrikes." After the SEALs completed their raid, they extracted from the area with the help of air support from a helicopter.

== Operation Juniper Shield ==
=== Deployment to Mali ===
In 2017, SEAL Team Six was deployed to Mali to support French and Malian counter-terrorism operations against al-Qaeda in the Islamic Maghreb, and other terrorist cells.

== Operation Wildcat Torrent ==
On October 26, 2020, U.S. citizen Philip Walton was abducted from his farm in Massalata in southern Niger early in the morning by armed kidnappers who demanded a ransom from the man's father. Approximately three days later DEVGRU Silver squadron conducted Operation Wildcat Torrent based on intelligence gathered by the CIA, supported by elements of MARSOC, that rescued Walton and killed 6 out of the 7 captors.

== 2019 North Korea operation ==
In early 2019, the United States conducted an operation in which SEAL Team Six attempted to plant a covert listening device to intercept North Korean communications regarding the ongoing high-level nuclear talks between Supreme Leader Kim Jong Un and U.S. president Donald Trump. The operation failed when the team encountered a small boat (carrying shellfishermen) and opened fire on it, blowing their cover.

The operation was publicly revealed by The New York Times on September 5, 2025. The same article also revealed the existence of a 2005 Navy SEAL operation that went ashore in North Korea.

== 2023 Sudan Conflict ==
=== Sudan Embassy Evacuation ===
On 22 April 2023, SEAL Team Six and the Army's 3rd Special Forces Group evacuated 70 staff members from the US Embassy in Sudan.

== 2026 Iran War ==
=== Rescue of American F-15E Weapons Systems Officer ===
DEVGRU along with 24th STS recovered the downed American F-15E Weapons Systems Officer or WSO. On April 5th 2026 ending a two day search and rescue effort for him. They not only raced against the Iranian Revolutionary Guard core forces but also against local nomadic tribes in the area. This was after the WSO who was a Corneal activated his beacon on top of a 7,000 foot summit in the Zagros Mountains. The DEVGRU operators moved in to rescue the WSO. The SEALs then engaged with the local IRGC forces by suppressing fire and calling in air strikes against them until they were able to exfill the area with the WSO. However back at the landing strip two of the C-130Js along with multiple little bird helicopters became stuck in the loose sand. So the US sent another C-130J to extract the operators and the pilots. The two C-130Js and MH-6 Little Bird helicopters that became stuck were prepped for demolition and blown up with thermite to prevent them from falling into the IRGCs hands. All operators and the WSO were recovered with no and in some cases like the WSOs with minor injuries.

== 2026 Nigeria ==
=== Killing of Abu-Bilal al-Minuki ===
The operation began at approximately 12:01 a.m. on May 15 2026, when two dozen operators arriving by helicopter, including SEAL Team Six, began fighting militants on two small islands in the Lake Chad Basin with the intent to capture al-Minuki. After a three-hour firefight, a surrender seemed unlikely.

Rather than risking a potential escape, an airstrike was launched on his compound, killing al-Minuki. The operation also resulted in the deaths of several other ISWAP figures, including Abd-al Wahhab, a senior leader involved in coordinating attacks and spreading propaganda; Abu Musa al-Mangawi, a senior member of the group; and Abu al-Muthanna al-Muhajir, who managed ISWAP's media production operations and was considered a close associate of al-Minuki.

== See also ==
- List of operations conducted by Delta Force
- Joint Special Operations Command Task Force in the Iraq War
- Task Force 6-26
- Task Force 121
- Operation Neptune Spear
- Operation Gothic Serpent
