= Angoor =

Angoor may refer to:

- Angoor (1982 film), a 1982 Indian Hindi-language comedy film by Gulzar, ultimately based on Shakespeare's The Comedy of Errors
- Cirkus (working title Angoor), 2022 Indian Hindi-language comedy film by Rohit Shetty, remake of the 1982 film
- Angoor Lata Deka, Indian actress and politician

== See also ==
- Angur (disambiguation)
- Ulta Palta (disambiguation), title of various other Indian films also based on the play
- Comedy of errors (disambiguation)
- Angoori rasmalai, an Indian dessert that has the shape of a grape
- Angoori Manmohan Tiwari, fictional character in the Indian sitcom Bhabiji Ghar Par Hain!
