= Ulta Palta =

Ulta Palta may refer to:

- Ulta Palta (1997 film), an Indian Kannada-language comedy film by N. S. Shankar, based on William Shakespeare's The Comedy of Errors
- Ulta Palta (1998 film), an Indian Telugu-language comedy film by Relangi Narasimha Rao, remake of the 1997 film

== See also ==
- Angoor (disambiguation), title of various other Indian films also based on the play
- Comedy of errors (disambiguation)
- Ulta (disambiguation)
- Palta (disambiguation)
- Ambuttu Imbuttu Embuttu, a 2005 Indian Tamil-language comedy film by Ashok Kashyap, remake of the 1997 film
