= Palta =

Palta may refer to:

- Palta people, an ethnic group of the Ecuadorian Amazon
- Palta language, a language of the Ecuadorian Amazon
- Palta, North 24 Parganas, a neighbourhood in North Barrackpur municipality, North 24 Parganas district, West Bengal, India
- Paltapara, a census town in Barrackpore I CD Block, North 24 Parganas district, West Bengal, India
  - Palta railway station
- Palta, avocado in South American Spanish

== See also ==
- Ulta Palta (disambiguation)
- Mari Palta, Swedish scientist
