= Ulta =

Ulta may refer to:

- Ulta (mountain), a mountain in Peru
- Ulta Beauty, a chain of beauty stores in the United States
- Ulta people, indigenous ethnic group in Siberia and Japan
  - Ulta language, language of the Ulta people
- Ulta (film), a 2019 Indian Malayalam-language comedy drama film

== See also ==
- Ulta Palta (disambiguation)
