= Comedy of errors (disambiguation) =

The Comedy of Errors is a farcical comedy play by William Shakespeare.

Comedy of Errors may also refer to:

- The Comedy of Errors (musical), adapted by Trevor Nunn
- BBC Television Shakespeare - Season Six - The Comedy of Errors (1983) directed by James Cellan Jones
- Comedy of Errors (horse), a champion British racehorse of the 1970s

== See also ==
- A Comedy of Terrors, 2021 historical novel by Lindsey Davis
- Menaechmi, comic play by Plautus (254 BC-184 BC), basis for the play by Shakespeare
- Angoor (disambiguation), title of various Indian films based on the play
- Ulta Palta (disambiguation), title of various other Indian films also based on the play
- Mistaken identity
