= Anguran =

Anguran and Angooran (Persian: انگوران) may refer to one of several locations in Iran:

- Anguran, Hormozgan
- Anguran, Bashagard, Hormozgan Province
- Anguran, Mazandaran
- Anguran, Zanjan
- Anguran District, in Zanjan Province
- Anguran Rural District, in Zanjan Province
