= Angoor Adda raid =

2008 Covert anti-Taliban raid conducted by Seal Team 6 against in Angoor Adda

- Part of the Insurgency in Khyber Pakhtunkhwa and War in Afghanistan (2001–2021)
Date	September 3, 2008
Location	Angoor Adda, South Waziristan, Federally Administered Tribal Areas, Pakistan
Result	American victory

Belligerents
United States	Taliban; Hezb-e-Islami

Units involved
US Naval Special Warfare Development Group	Taliban fighters (borderless) Hezb-e-Islami militants

Strength
45 Operators	Approximately 120–130 fighters

Casualties and losses
Unknown	Unknown
- Estimated 20 people killed, civilian number unclear

The Angoor Adda raid (Pashto: د انګور اډې بريد) was a covert raid conducted by SEAL Team Six Blue squadron against Taliban fighters on September 3, 2008, within the border town of Angoor Adda in South Waziristan. It was the first time American Troops fought a ground-based battle against the Taliban within Pakistani borders. The raid took place at the same time as Pakistani military forces ended a four-week offensive in Bajaur, the northernmost Agency of the Federally Administered Tribal Areas of which South Waziristan is the southernmost, an offensive that has displaced approximately half a million people.

== Operations ==
By September 2008, the trail of intelligence to find Osama bin Laden, had gone cold, and then-Vice Admiral William McRaven wanted to jump-start the effort. The target of the raid was a minor al-Qaeda facilitator. The raid was carried out by DEVGRU's Blue Squadron.

The raid occurred in the village of Mūsā Nīkə (موسی نيکه) of the Angoor Adda region of South Waziristan, Pakistan, less than one mile (1.6 km) from the border of Afghanistan. The operation was executed at 3:00 AM local time (23h00 in UTC). Though the U.S. has performed missile strikes in Pakistan before, this is reportedly the first time U.S. troops have taken ground action within the country against Taliban fighters. According to some early reports, roughly twenty people, possibly including three women and four children, were killed in the raid. However, it is not clear whether these were civilians or combatants; an American official stated that the women killed were helping the hostile militants.

CH-47 Chinook helicopters carrying 45 U.S. Navy SEALs conducted the raid. Only one of the helicopters landed and unloaded, while the two others flew overhead providing surveillance and aerial support to the other team. Two F-16 fighter jets also provided air cover. The forces attacked three houses, owned by "Faujan Wazir, Faiz Mohammad and Nazar Jan Wazir." The entire operation lasted 30 minutes. All of the inhabitants were apparently asleep when the raid occurred, other sources say that as the SEALs scaled the walls of a compound, a resident opened fire on them with a shotgun and women inside began throwing themselves on the SEALs whilst the male occupants fled the houses. After examination, none of the dead proved to be "important terrorists or high-value targets." A U.S. military official stated that "a small number of militants [were] captured and several others killed," but refused to comment on exact numbers. After the SEALs completed their raid, an aircraft nearby reported that Pakistani forces were moving toward the SEALs. After the SEAL squadron commander received the report, he called in two MH-60 Black Hawks and the SEALs extracted at about 3 or 4 A.M., taking a few detainees with them.

== Response ==
A statement made by the Government of Pakistan said that "a strong protest by [the] Foreign Office has been lodged with [the] Government of United States," and "such acts of aggression do not serve the common cause of fighting terrorism and militancy in the area." On September 4, the Pakistani parliament passed a resolution condemning the raid and demanding increased American oversight and cooperation with Pakistani officials when conducting covert operations. Anne W. Patterson, the United States Ambassador to Pakistan, was called to the Pakistan Foreign Office, where a protest was lodged. In response to the raid, Pakistani Foreign Minister Shah Mehmood Qureshi told the National Assembly on Thursday, "There is no high-value target or known terrorist among the dead ... Only innocent civilians, including women and children, have been targeted."

In response to the raid, United States Secretary of State Condoleezza Rice said, "I don't have anything for you on Pakistan, except to say that obviously we are working very closely with the civilian government there." Rice refused to comment on the possibility of civilian casualties. Reuters cited U.S. Pentagon officials, speaking on condition of anonymity, who confirmed that the raid was conducted by U.S. special operations forces.

The Chairman of the Pakistani Joint Chiefs of Staff Committee (JCSC), Gen Tariq Majid, stated that "Pakistan reserves right to retaliate".

On Saturday, September 6, 2008, Pakistan blocked a fuel route supplying U.S. and other western forces operating in Afghanistan in response to the raid. "We have told them that we will take action and we have already taken action today. We have stopped the supply of oil and this will tell how serious we are," said Pakistani Defence Minister Ahmad Mukhtar.

== See also ==
- List of drone strikes in Pakistan
- List of operations conducted by SEAL Team Six
