= Angaz Rustai Shehidarhimi =

Angaz Rustai Shehidarhimi انگزروستاي شهيدرحيمي
- Village
- Location within Iran
- Coordinates: 33°21′17″N 48°23′43″E
- Country: Iran
- Province: Lorestan
- County: Khorramabad
- Bakhsh: Central
- Rural District: Koregah-e Sharqi

Population (2006)
  - Total: 387
- Time zone: UTC+3:30 (IRST)
  - Summer (DST): UTC+4:30 (IRDT)

Angaz Rustai Shehidarhimi (Persian: انگزروستاي شهيدرحيمي, also Romanized as Āngaz Rūstāī Shehīdarḥīmī; also known as Angūr, Angaz, Angowz, Angoz, and Angūz) is a village in Koregah-e Sharqi Rural District, in the Central District of Khorramabad County, Lorestan Province, Iran. At the 2006 census, its population was 387, in 63 families.
