= Angoori rasmalai =

Indian dessert

Angoori
- Course: Dessert
- Place of origin: India
- Region or state: North India
- Main ingredients: Milk, ricotta cheese, sugar

Angoori rasmalai is an Indian dessert and a type of Ras malai. It is similar to the Odisha dish, Khira sagara. The dessert is made from cottage cheese which is then soaked in chashni, a sugary syrup, and rolled in fine sugar to form grape-sized balls.

Angoori derives its name from Angoor which is Hindi for grape, and Punjabi for malted barley signifying the shape and form, and also alluding to its sweetness.
