= Site exploitation =

Military data collection term

Site exploitation (SE), synonymous with tactical site exploitation and sensitive site exploitation (SSE), is a military term used by the United States to describe "collecting information, material, and persons from a designated location and analyzing them to answer information requirements, facilitate subsequent operations, or support criminal prosecution".

Sensitive site exploitation was conducted during the invasion of Iraq in Operation Iraqi Freedom when a key part of the Coalition Forces' mission was to discover weapons of mass destruction (WMDs). The "sensitive" of SSE referred to the possibility that sites searched might have contained chemical, biological, radiological, or nuclear (CBRN) materials inherent in WMDs. Later, an effort was made to refer to the practice as "SE" (site exploitation) instead of "SSE" because sites were still being searched and exploited, but more generally for intelligence gathering and not with the intent of locating WMDs.

The main intent of site exploitation is to extract as much potential intelligence as possible from the site of a raid or point of interest in hopes that the data collected will lead to further enemy targets or answer priority intelligence requirements (PIR). A secondary benefit is that this data can be used to help prosecute criminals, if done correctly in accordance with local law.

Site exploitation consists of the following phases: securing the site (usually through a raid), documenting the site, searching the site, prioritizing exfiltration, and exploiting materials found.

== Appearances in media ==
The term SSE was used in the 2012 film Zero Dark Thirty, when Navy SEALs attempt to retrieve as much data as possible from the computers and paper files of Osama bin Laden once they have secured his compound in Abbottabad. It was also used in the 2017 television series SEAL Team during missions against high value targets (HVT) in several episodes, and in the 2018 series Tom Clancy's Jack Ryan, when CIA Special Activities agents are discussing the plan to infiltrate Mousa Bin Suleiman's compound in season 1 episode 7. In the 2019 video game Call of Duty: Modern Warfare it is mentioned at the end of the "Clean House" mission, in which the player clears a townhouse in north London with the SAS. In the 2022 film The Gray Man, the CIA agents used it when getting pocket litter from Sierra Four. It's also used in game Battlefield 6 when a site is secured during the Campaign mission Operation Gladius.
