= Anguran, Hormozgan =

Anguran انگوران
- Village
- Location within Iran
- Coordinates: 27°14′02″N 55°49′18″E
- Country: Iran
- Province: Hormozgan
- County: Khamir
- Bakhsh: Central
- Rural District: Kohurestan

Population (2006)
  - Total: 200
- Time zone: UTC+3:30 (IRST)
  - Summer (DST): UTC+4:30 (IRDT)

Anguran (Persian: انگوران, also Romanized as Angūrān and Angooran; also known as Angūru) is a village in Kohurestan Rural District, in the Central District of Khamir County, Hormozgan Province, Iran. At the 2006 census, its population was 200, in 44 families.
