= List of intelligence agencies =

This is a list of intelligence agencies by country. It includes only currently operational institutions which are in the public domain. The list is not intended to be exhaustive.

An intelligence agency is a government agency responsible for the collection, analysis, and exploitation of information in support of law enforcement, national security, military, and foreign policy objectives.

== Afghanistan ==
- General Directorate of Intelligence (GDI) – د استخباراتو لوی ریاست

== Albania ==
- State Intelligence Service (SHISH) – Sherbimi Informativ Shteteror

== Algeria ==
- Directorate of Security Services
- Central Directorate of Army Security

== Antigua and Barbuda ==
- Office of the Prime Minister
  - National Security Council (NSC)
  - Antigua and Barbuda Defence Force (ABDF)
    - Intelligence Centre (IC)
- Ministry of Finance, Corporate Governance and Public Private Partnerships
  - Financial Intelligence Unit (FIU)
- Ministry of Legal Affairs, Public Safety, Immigration and Labour
  - Criminal Investigations Department (CID)

== Argentina ==
- President's Office
  - Federal Intelligence Agency (AFI) – Agencia Federal de Inteligencia
    - Directorate of Judicial Surveillance (DOJ) – Dirección de Observaciones Judiciales
    - Federal Counternarcotics Service (SEFECONAR) – Servicio Federal de Lucha contra el Narcotráfico
    - Argentine National Gendarmerie Intelligence (SIGN) – Inteligencia de la Gendarmería Nacional Argentina
- Ministry of Defense
  - National Directorate of Strategic Military Intelligence (DNIEM) – Dirección Nacional de Inteligencia Estratégica Militar
- Ministry of Justice
  - Federal Penitentiary Service Intelligence – Inteligencia del Servicio Penitenciario Federal
  - Airport Security Police Intelligence – Inteligencia de la Policía de Seguridad Aeroportuaria
- Ministry of Interior
  - National Directorate of Criminal Intelligence (DNIC) – Dirección Nacional de Inteligencia Criminal
  - Argentine Federal Police Intelligence – Inteligencia de la Policía Federal Argentina
  - Buenos Aires Police Intelligence (SIPBA) (Buenos Aires Police Intelligence) – Inteligencia de la Policía Bonaerense
  - Argentine Naval Prefecture Intelligence (SIPN) – Inteligencia de la Prefectura Naval Argentina
- Ministry of Economy
  - Financial Intelligence Unit (UIF) – Unidad de Inteligencia Financiera
- Intelligence Department of the Joint General Staff of the Armed Forces (J-2)
  - Military Intelligence Collection Center (CRIM) – Central de Reunión de Inteligencia Militar
  - Army Intelligence Service (SIE) – Servicio de Inteligencia del Ejército
  - Naval Intelligence Service (SIN) – Servicio de Inteligencia Naval
  - Air Force Intelligence Service (SIFA) – Servicio de Inteligencia de la Fuerza Aérea

== Armenia ==
- National Security Service (NSS)
- Foreign Intelligence Service (FIS)

== Australia ==
- Office of National Intelligence (ONI)
- Department of Foreign Affairs and Trade
  - Australian Secret Intelligence Service (ASIS)
- Department of Home Affairs
  - Australian Security Intelligence Organisation (ASIO)
- Department of Defence
  - Defence Intelligence Organisation (DIO)
  - Australian Signals Directorate (ASD)
  - Australian Geospatial-Intelligence Organisation (AGO)

== Austria ==
- Bundesministerium für Landesverteidigung (BMLV): Federal Ministry of Defence
  - Heeresnachrichtenamt (HNA): Army Intelligence Office
  - Abwehramt (AbwA): Counter-Intelligence Office
- Bundesministerium für Inneres (BMI): Federal Ministry of the Interior
  - Direktion Staatsschutz und Nachrichtendienst (DSN): Directorate State Protection and Intelligence Service

== Azerbaijan ==
- State Security Service (Dövlət Təhlükəsizliyi Xidməti)
- Foreign Intelligence Service (Xarici Kəşfiyyat Xidməti)
- Financial Monitoring Service (Maliyyə Monitorinqi Xidməti)

== Bahamas ==
- Security and Intelligence Branch (SIB)
- Financial Intelligence Unit (FIU)
- National Crime Intelligence Agency (NCIA)

== Bahrain ==
- NSA – National Security Agency

== Bangladesh ==
- Prime Minister's Office
  - National Committee for Intelligence Coordination
  - National Security Intelligence (NSI)
  - Special Security Force – Intelligence Bureau (SSF-IB)
- Ministry of Home Affairs
  - Special Branch (SB)
  - Detective Branch (DB)
  - Police Bureau of Investigation (PBI)
  - Criminal Investigation Department (CID)
  - Counter Terrorism and Transnational Crime (CTTC)
  - Intelligence Wing of the Rapid Action Battalion
- Ministry of Defence
  - Directorate General of Forces Intelligence (DGFI)
  - Counter Terrorism and Intelligence Bureau (CTIB)
  - National Telecommunication Monitoring Centre (NTMC)
- Ministry of Finance
  - Central Intelligence Unit (CIU)
  - Bangladesh Financial Intelligence Unit (BFIU)
- Ministry of Posts, Telecommunications and Information Technology
  - Cyber Security Agency
- Anti-Corruption Commission (Bangladesh)

== Barbados ==
- Financial Intelligence Unit (FIU)
- Criminal Investigations Department (CID)

== Belarus ==
- State Security Committee of the Republic of Belarus (KDB/KGB) (State Security Committee)

== Belgium ==
- VSSE (State Security Service)
- ADIV / SGRS (General Intelligence and Security Service)

== Bosnia and Herzegovina ==
- Intelligence-Security Agency of Bosnia and Herzegovina (OSA)
- Državna Agencija za Istrage i Zaštitu (State Investigation and Protection Agency, SIPA)

== Botswana ==
- Directorate of Intelligence and Security (DIS)

== Brazil ==
- Brazilian Intelligence Agency (ABIN)
- Federal Police Department (DPF) (counterintelligence agency)
- Gabinete de Segurança Institucional (Institutional Security Bureau) (GSI) Responds directly to the president's office and the armed forces. Coordinates some intelligence operations.
- Secretaria da Receita Federal do Brasil (Federal Revenue Secretariat) (RFB) (General Coordination for Research and Investigations - Coordenação-Geral de Pesquisa e Investigação - Copei)

== Brunei ==
- Internal Security Department (Brunei) (internal)

== Bulgaria ==
- State Intelligence Agency (Държавна агенция „Разузнаване“ (DAR)) – overseas intelligence gathering service under the supervision of the Council of Ministers of Bulgaria
- State Agency for National Security (Държавна агенция за национална сигурност (DANS)) – national security service under the supervision of the Council of Ministers of Bulgaria

== Burundi ==
- Service national de renseignement (SNR)

== Canada ==
- Canadian Security Intelligence Service (CSIS)
- Communications Security Establishment (CSE)
- Canadian Forces Intelligence Command (DND)
  - Canadian Forces National Counter-Intelligence Unit (DND) operated by the Canadian Forces Military Police Group
  - Joint Task Force X
- Criminal Intelligence Service Canada (CISC)
- Intelligence Branch
- Financial Transactions and Reports Analysis Centre of Canada (FINTRAC)
- Global Affairs Canada (GAC) Bureau of Intelligence Analysis and Security and Bureau of Economic Intelligence
- Royal Canadian Mounted Police (RCMP) Intelligence Division
- Canada Border Services Agency (CBSA) Immigrations Intelligence

== Chad ==
- Agence nationale de sécurité (ANS)

== Chile ==
- Ministry of Interior
  - National Intelligence Agency (ANI) – Agencia Nacional de Inteligencia

== People's Republic of China ==
Central Committee of the Chinese Communist Party (CCCPC)

- International Department (ID)
- United Front Work Department (UFWD)

People's Liberation Army (PLA)

- Joint Staff Department of the Central Military Commission (JSDCMC)
  - Intelligence Bureau of the Joint Staff Department (IBJSD)
- Ministry of Public Security (MPS)
- Ministry of State Security (MSS)
- Office for Safeguarding National Security of the CPG in the HKSAR (OSNS)

== Colombia ==
- Dirección Nacional de Inteligencia (DNI)

== Democratic Republic of the Congo ==
- National Intelligence Agency (ANR)
- General Staff of Military intelligence (ex-DEMIAP)

== Croatia ==
Internal and Foreign Intelligence

- Sigurnosno-obavještajna agencija (SOA) (Security and Intelligence Agency)

Military Intelligence

- Vojna sigurnosno-obavještajna agencija (VSOA) (Military Security and Intelligence Agency)

== Cuba ==
Communist Party of Cuba (PCC)

- Ministry of the FAR (MINFAR)
  - Military Counterintelligence Directorate
- Ministry of the Interior
  - Dirección de Inteligencia (G2)

== Cyprus ==
- Cyprus Intelligence Service (CIS) (Κυπριακή Υπηρεσία Πληροφοριών)(ΚΥΠ), (former Central Intelligence Service-KYP)

== Czech Republic ==
- Security Information Service (Bezpečnostní informační služba, BIS)
- Office for Foreign Relations and Information (Úřad pro zahraniční styky a informace, ÚZSI)
- Ministry of Defence
  - Military Intelligence (Vojenské zpravodajství, VZ)

== Denmark ==
- Danish Security and Intelligence Service (Politiets Efterretningstjeneste (PET)).
- Danish Defence Intelligence Service (Forsvarets Efterretningstjeneste (FE)).
- Army Intelligence Center (Efterretningsregimentet (EFR)).

== Egypt ==
- Gihaz al-Mukhabarat al-Amma (GIS) (General Intelligence Service)
- Idarat al-Mukhabarat al-Harbyya wa al-Istitla (OMIR) (Office of Military Intelligence and Reconnaissance)
- Al-amn al-Watani (HS) (Homeland Security)

== Eritrea ==
- National Security Office

== Estonia ==
- Estonian Internal Security Service (KaPo) (Kaitsepolitseiamet)
- Estonian Foreign Intelligence Service (VLA) (Välisluureamet)
- Military Intelligence Centre of Estonian Defence Forces (Kaitseväe luurekeskus)

== Ethiopia ==
- National Intelligence and Security Service (NISS) - (የብሔራዊ መረጃና ደህንነት አገልግሎት)
- Information Network Security Agency (INSA) - ( የመረጃ መረብ ደህንነት አስተዳደር)

== Finland ==
- Ministry of Defence
  - Finnish Defence Intelligence Agency – Puolustusvoimien tiedustelulaitos (PVTIEDL) / Försvarsmaktens underrättelsetjänst
  - Defense Command Intelligence Division – Pääesikunnan tiedusteluosasto (PE TIEDOS) / Huvudstabens underrättelseavdelning)
- Ministry of Interior
  - Finnish Security Intelligence Service (SUPO) – Suojelupoliisi / Skyddspolisen

== France ==
- President of France
  - National Centre for Counter Terrorism (CNRLT, Coordination nationale du renseignement et de la lutte contre le terrorisme)
- Ministry of Interior
  - General Directorate for Internal Security (DGSI; Direction générale de la sécurité intérieure) – Domestic counter-terrorism and counter-espionage intelligence.
  - National Police
    - Central Directorate of Public Security
      - direction nationale du renseignement territorial (DNRT)
    - Central Directorate of the Judicial Police (DCPJ; Direction centrale de la Police judiciaire) – Organised crime intelligence.
      - Sous-direction anti-terroriste (SDAT)
- Ministry of Defence
  - Directorate-General for External Security (DGSE; Direction générale de la sécurité extérieure) – Foreign intelligence relating to national security.
  - Direction du Renseignement et de la Sécurité de la Défense (DRSD; Direction du Renseignement et de la Sécurité de la Défense) – Foreign intelligence relating to national security.
  - Directorate of Military Intelligence (DRM; Direction du renseignement militaire) – Military intelligence.
- Ministry of Finance
  - Tracfin
  - Direction Nationale du Renseignement et des Enquêtes Douanières (DNRED)

== Gambia ==
- State Intelligence Services (the Gambia) (SIS)

== Georgia ==
- State Security Service (SSSG) − სახელმწიფო უშიშროების სამსახური
- Georgian Intelligence Service (GIS) − საქართველოს დაზვერვის სამსახური
- Georgian Armed Forces
  - Military Intelligence Department

== Germany ==
=== Federal ===
- Bundeskanzleramt: Federal Chancellery
  - Bundesnachrichtendienst (BND): Federal Intelligence Service
- Bundesministerium des Innern (BMI): Federal Ministry of Interior
  - Bundesamt für Verfassungsschutz (BfV): Federal Office for the Protection of the Constitution
  - Bundesamt für Sicherheit in der Informationstechnik (BSI): Federal Office for Information Security
- Bundespolizei: Federal Police
  - Zentrum für Informations- und Kommunikationstechnik (IKTZ): Center for information and communication technology
- Bundeswehr: Federal Defense Force
  - Militärischer Abschirmdienst (MAD): Military Counterintelligence Service

=== State ===
- Landesministerium des Innern: State Ministry of the Interior (different denominations from state to state)
  - Landesamt für Verfassungsschutz (LfV): (semi-independent) State Authority for the Protection of the Constitution for every single state

== Ghana ==
- Bureau of National Investigations (BNI) – (Internal Intelligence Agency)

== Greece ==
- Prime Minister of the Hellenic Republic
  - National Intelligence Service (NIS) – Εθνική Υπηρεσία Πληροφοριών (ΕΥΠ)
- Hellenic National Defence General Staff
  - E Division – Intelligence Division

== Guyana ==
- National Intelligence and Security Agency (NISA)
- Financial Intelligence Unit (FIU)

== Hungary ==
- Információs Hivatal (IH) (Information Office)
- Alkotmányvédelmi Hivatal (AH) (Constitution Protection Office)
- Terrorelhárítási Központ (TEK) (Counter Terrorism Centre)
- Nemzetbiztonsági Szakszolgálat (NBSZ) (Special Service for National Security)
- Nemzeti Információs Központ (NIK) (National Information Center)
- Katonai Nemzetbiztonsági Szolgálat (KNBSZ) (Military National Security Service)

== Iceland ==
- The National Police Commissioner's Analysis Unit – Greiningardeild Ríkislögreglustjóra (GRLS)
- Icelandic Defense Agency's Analysis Unit – Greiningardeild Varnarmálastofnunar Íslands (GVMSÍ)

== India ==
Prime Minister's Office

- National Technical Research Organisation (NTRO)

Cabinet Secretariat

- External intelligence
  - Research & Analysis Wing (R&AW)

Ministry of Home Affairs

- Internal intelligence
  - Intelligence Bureau (IB)
  - National Investigation Agency (NIA)
- Criminal intelligence
  - Central Bureau of Investigation (CBI)
  - Narcotics Control Bureau (NCB)

Ministry of Defence

- Military intelligence
  - Defense Intelligence Agency (DIA)
  - Directorate of Military Intelligence
  - Directorate of Air Intelligence
  - Directorate of Naval Intelligence
- Signals intelligence
  - Joint Cipher Bureau (JCB)
  - Signals Intelligence Directorate
- Others
  - Central Monitoring Organisation

Ministry of Finance

- Economic intelligence
  - Economic Intelligence Council
  - Central Economic Intelligence Bureau
  - Enforcement Directorate (ED)
  - Central Bureau of Narcotics (CBN)
  - Directorate General of Income Tax Investigation
  - Financial Intelligence Unit (FIU)
  - Directorate of Income Tax Intelligence and Criminal Investigation
  - Directorate General of GST Intelligence
  - Directorate of Revenue Intelligence (DRI)

Ministry of Communications

- Telecom monitoring
  - Telecom Enforcement Resource and Monitoring (TERM)

Ministry of Electronics and Information Technology

- Cybersecurity
  - National Cyber Coordination Centre

Ministry of Information and Broadcasting

- Radio monitoring
  - All India Radio Monitoring Service

== Indonesia ==
- Foreign/Domestic Intelligence
  - State Intelligence Agency (BIN) – Badan Intelijen Negara
- Military Intelligence
  - Indonesian Strategic Intelligence Agency (BAIS) – Badan Intelijen Strategis Tentara Nasional Indonesia
  - Indonesian Army Intelligence Centre (PUSINTELAD) – Pusat Intelijen Tentara Nasional Indonesia Angkatan Darat
- Signals Intelligence
  - National Cyber and Crypto Agency (BSSN) – Badan Siber dan Sandi Negara
- Criminal Intelligence
  - Deputy Attorney General on Intelligence (Under the Attorney General's Office) – Jaksa Agung Muda Bidang Intelijen Kejaksaan Agung
  - Directorate of Immigration Intelligence – Direktorat Intelijen Imigrasi
  - National Narcotics Agency Intelligence Section – Seksi Intelijen Badan Narkotika Nasional
  - Indonesian National Police Intelligence and Security Agency - Badan Intelijen dan Keamanan Kepolisian Negara Republik Indonesia
- Financial Intelligence
  - Directorate of Tax Intelligence - Direktorat Intelijen Perpajakan Direktorat Jenderal Pajak
  - Customs & Excise Sub-Directorate of Intelligence – Sub-Direktorat Intelijen Direktorat Jenderal Bea Cukai
  - Indonesian Financial Transaction Reports and Analysis Center (PPATK) – Pusat Pelaporan dan Analisis Transaksi Keuangan
  - Corruption Eradication Commission (KPK) — Komisi Pemberantasan Korupsi

== Iran ==
- Ministry of Intelligence (VAJA)
- Council for Intelligence Coordination
- Islamic Republic of Iran Army:
  - Intelligence Protection Organization of Iranian Army (SAHEFAJA)
- Islamic Revolutionary Guard Corps:
  - Intelligence Organization of IRGC (SAS)
  - Intelligence Protection Organization of IRGC (SAHEFASA)
- FARAJA
  - Intelligence Organization of FARAJA

== Iraq ==
Prime Minister's Office

- Iraqi National Intelligence Service - (INIS)
- Counter Terrorism Service - (CTS)
- Falcons Intelligence Cell - (FIC)
- Iraqi National Security Service - (INSS)

Ministry of Defence

- Directorate-General for Intelligence and Security (DGIS)
- Directorate of Military Intelligence (DMI)

Ministry of Interior

- Federal Intelligence and Investigations Agency (FIIA)

== Ireland ==
Foreign & Domestic Military Intelligence (Defence Forces)

- Directorate of Military Intelligence (G2)
- Communications and Information Services Corps (CIS) SIGINT Section

Domestic Police Intelligence (Garda Síochána)

- Crime & Security Branch (CSB)
  - Special Detective Unit (SDU)
  - National Surveillance Unit (NSU)
- Financial Intelligence Unit (FIU)

== Israel ==
- Mossad (Foreign Intelligence and Special Operations)
- Shin Bet (Internal Security Service)
- Aman (Military intelligence)
- Lahav 433 (Police intelligence)

== Italy ==
Dipartimento delle Informazioni per la Sicurezza (DIS) - Department of Information for Security

- Internal Intelligence:
  - Agenzia Informazioni e Sicurezza Interna (AISI) - Agency for Internal Information and Security
- External Intelligence:
  - Agenzia Informazioni e Sicurezza Esterna (AISE) - Agency for External Information and Security
- Military Intelligence:
  - Centro Intelligence Interforze (CII) - Joint Intelligence Center

== Jamaica ==
- Ministry of Finance and the Public Service
  - Financial Investigations Division (FID)

== Japan ==
- Cabinet Secretariat
- Ministry of Defense (MOD)
  - Defense Intelligence Headquarters (DIH)
  - Information Warfare Command (IWC)
- Ministry of Justice
  - Public Security Intelligence Agency (PSIA)
- Ministry of Land, Infrastructure, Transport and Tourism (MLIT)
  - Japan Coast Guard (JCG)
    - Guard and Rescue Department (警備救難部) (GRD)
      - Security and Intelligence Division (警備情報課) (SID)
- National Intelligence Council
  - National Intelligence Bureau
- National Public Safety Commission (NPSC)
  - National Police Agency (NPA)
    - National Police Agency Security Bureau (NPASB)
    - Tokyo Metropolitan Police Department (TMPD)
      - Public Security Bureau (PSB)

== Jordan ==
- General Intelligence Department (GID) - (Da'irat al-Mukhabarat al-'Ammah)

== Kazakhstan ==
- Foreign Intelligence Service (Kazakhstan)
- National Security Committee (Kazakhstan)

== Kosovo ==
- Kosovo Intelligence Agency (KIA) - Agjencia e Kosovës për Inteligjencë (AKI)

== Kenya ==
- National Intelligence Service(NIS)
- Directorate of Criminal Investigation(DCI)
- Military Intelligence(MI)

== Kyrgyzstan ==
- State Committee for National Security (UKMK/GKNB)

== Latvia ==
- State Security Service (Latvia)

== Lebanon ==
- General Directorate of General Security
- The Information Branch
- Lebanese State Security

== Liberia ==
- National Security Agency

== Lithuania ==
- State Security Department - (Valstybes saugumo departamentas (VSD))
- Second Investigation Department - (Antrasis operatyvinių tarnybų departamentas (AOTD))

== Luxembourg ==
- Luxembourg State Intelligence Service - (Service de Renseignement de l'État Luxembourgeois)

== Madagascar ==
- Central Intelligence Service (CIS)

== Malaysia ==
- Malaysian Defence Intelligence Organisation (Military Intelligence)
- Malaysian External Intelligence Organisation (Foreign Intelligence)
- Malaysian Special Branch (Police & Internal Intelligence)

== Mali ==
- National State Security Agency (ANSE)
  - ANSE replaced the former Directorate General for External Security (DGSE) in 2021

== Mexico ==
- Federal government of Mexico
  - Civilian agencies
    - Attorney General of Mexico (FGR)
      - Crime-Combat Planning, Analysis and Information Center (CENAPI / PGR – Centro de Planeación, Análisis e Información para el Combate a la Delincuencia)
      - Assistant Attorney General's Office for Special Investigations on Organized Crime (SEIDO / PGR)
    - Secretariat of the Interior (SEGOB)
      - National Commission for Security (CNS)
        - Mexican Federal Police
          - Intelligence Division of the Federal Police (Division de Inteligencia – CNS / Policia Federal)
      - National Intelligence Centre (CNI)
  - Military agencies
    - Secretariat of National Defense (SEDENA)
      - 2nd Section of the National Defense Intelligence Staff (SEDENA S-2 – Seccion 2da: Inteligencia del Estado Mayor)
      - Military Intelligence – National Defense Ministry (Inteligencia Militar – SEDENA / Ejercito y Fuerza Aerea)
    - Mexican Navy
      - Naval Intelligence - (Inteligencia Naval / SEMAR / Marina Armada)

== Moldova ==
- Information and Security Service (SIS)
- State Protection and Guard Service of Moldova (SPPS)

== Mongolia ==
- General Intelligence Agency of Mongolia (GIA)

== Montenegro ==
- National Security Agency (ANB)

== Morocco ==
- General Directorate for Territorial Surveillance - Direction de la Surveillance du Territoire (DST)
- Deuxième Bureau (Morocco) - Military secret service
- Directorate of Research and Documentation - Direction Generale pour l'Etude et la Documentation (DGED)

== Myanmar ==
- Office of the Chief of Military Security Affairs (OCMSA)
- Bureau Of Special Investigation (BSI)
- Special Intelligence Department (SID)

== Namibia ==
- Namibia Central Intelligence Service (NCIS)

== Nepal ==
- Directorate of Military Intelligence (DMI)
- National Investigation Department (NID)

== Netherlands ==
- General Intelligence and Security Service - Algemene Inlichtingen en Veiligheidsdienst (AIVD)
- Defence Intelligence and Security Service - Militaire Inlichtingen en Veiligheidsdienst (MIVD)
  - Joint Sigint Cyber Unit (JSCU)
- National Coordinator for Counterterrorism and Security - Nationaal Coördinator Terrorismebestrijding en Veiligheid (NCTV)
- Royal Marechaussee - Koninklijke Marechaussee
  - Team Criminal Intelligence (KMar-TCI)
- Fiscal Information and Investigation Service - Fiscale Inlichtingen en Opsporingsdienst (FIOD-ECD)
  - Team Criminal Intelligence (FIOD-TCI)

== New Zealand ==
- Government Communications Security Bureau
- New Zealand Security Intelligence Service
- National Assessments Bureau

== Nigeria ==
- Office of National Security Adviser
  - National Counter Terrorism Centre
    - Directorate of Intelligence (DINT)
  - Intelligence Fusion Centre
  - National Intelligence Agency (NIA) — Foreign Intelligence and Counterintelligence
  - Department of State Services (DSS) — Domestic Intelligence and Counterintelligence, Internal Security)
- Ministry of Defence
  - Defence Intelligence Agency (DIA)— Military intelligence gathering and analysis
  - Defence Space Administration (DSA) — Geospatial intelligence (GEOINT) gathering and analysis
  - Nigerian Army Intelligence Corps (NAIC)
  - Directorate of Naval Intelligence (DNI) — Maritime Intelligence for the Navy
  - Directorate of Air Intelligence (DAI) — Aerial Intelligence, Surveillance, and Reconnaissance (ISR) for the Air Force.
- Ministry of Justice
  - National Drug Law Enforcement Agency (NDLEA)
    - Directorate of Intelligence (DINT)
- Nigerian Financial Intelligence Unit (NFIU) — Financial and Economic crime intelligence gathering and analysis.
- Nigeria Police Force
  - Force Intelligence Department (FID) — Intelligence gathering, analysis, and dissemination for the Police.

== North Korea ==
- Reconnaissance General Bureau
- National Intelligence Agency

== North Macedonia ==
- Administration for Security and Counterintelligence (Uprava za bezbednost i kontrarazuznavanje) (Police Agency)
- Intelligence Agency (Agencija za Razuznavanje) (Civilian Agency) IA
- Military Service for Security and Intelligence (Voena služba za razuznuvanje i bezbednost) (Military Agency)

== Norway ==
- Nasjonal sikkerhetsmyndighet (NSM) (National Security Authority)
- Politiets sikkerhetstjeneste (PST) (Police Security Service)
- Etterretningstjenesten (NIS) (Norwegian Intelligence Service)
- Forsvarets sikkerhetstjeneste (FOST) – Norwegian Defence Security Service (NORDSS)

== Oman ==
- The Palace Office [Foreign Intelligence]
- Internal Security Service [Internal Security]

== Pakistan ==
National Intelligence Coordination Committee (NICC)

- External Intelligence
  - Inter-Services Intelligence (ISI)
- Defence Intelligence
  - Air Intelligence (AI)
  - Military Intelligence (MI)
  - Naval Intelligence (NI)
- Internal Intelligence
  - Intelligence Bureau (IB)
  - Federal Investigation Agency (FIA)
  - National Counter Terrorism Authority (NACTA)
  - Counter Terrorism Department (CTD)
  - Special Branch (Pakistan)
- Economic Intelligence & Securities
  - Federal Board of Revenue (FBR)
    - Directorate-General of Intelligence and Investigation (DGII)
  - Financial Monitoring Unit (FMU)
  - National Accountability Bureau (NAB)
- Other Intelligence
  - Anti-Narcotics Force (ANF)

== Palestine ==
Office of the President of Palestine

- General Intelligence Service (GIS, Arabic: جهاز المخابرات العامة, romanized: jihaz al-mukhābarāt al-ʻĀmmah)

Ministry of Interior

- Palestinian Security Services (PSS, Arabic: الأجهزة الأمنية الفلسطينية, romanized: al-Ajhizah al-Amnīyah al-Filasṭīnīyah)
  - Palestinian National Security Forces (NSF, Arabic: قوات الامن الوطني الفلسطيني, romanized: Qūwāt al-amn al-Waṭanī al-Filasṭīnī)
    - Palestinian Military Intelligence Service (MI, Arabic: الاستخبارات العسكرية, romanized: al-Astakhabarat al-'Askariyah)

== Panama ==
- National Police Intelligence Directorate (DNIP) – Dirección Nacional de Inteligencia Policial
- General Directorate of Analysis and Strategic Intelligence - Direccion General de Analisis e Inteligencia Estrategica (DGAIE)
- National Intelligence and Security Service - Servicio Nacional de Inteligencia y Seguridad (SENIS)

== Papua New Guinea ==
- National Intelligence Organization (NIO)

== Peru ==
- National Directorate of Intelligence - Dirección Nacional de Inteligencia (DINI)

== Philippines ==
- National Intelligence Coordinating Agency (NICA) – Pambansang Ahensiya sa Ugnayang Intelihensiya
- National Bureau of Investigation (NBI) – Pambansang Kawanihan ng Pagsisiyasat

== Poland ==
- Foreign Intelligence Agency - Agencja Wywiadu (AW)
- Internal Security Agency - Agencja Bezpieczeństwa Wewnętrznego (ABW)
- Military Intelligence Service - Służba Wywiadu Wojskowego (SWW)
- Military Counter-intelligence Service - Służba Kontrwywiadu Wojskowego (SKW)
- Operations and Investigations Directorate of the Border Guard Headquarters - Zarząd Operacyjno-Śledczy Komendy Głównej Straży Granicznej (KGSG, ZOŚ, KGSG)

== Portugal ==
- Intelligence System of the Portuguese Republic - Sistema de Informações da República Portuguesa (SIRP)
  - Security Intelligence Service - Serviço de Informações de Segurança (SIS)
  - Defense Strategic Intelligence Service - Serviço de Informações Estratégicas de Defesa (SIED)
- Military Intelligence and Security Service - Centro de Informações e Segurança Militares (CISMIL)

== Qatar ==
- Qatar State Security

== Romania ==
- Romanian Intelligence Service (SRI) – Serviciul Român de Informații
- Foreign Intelligence Service (SIE) – Serviciul de Informații Externe
- Special Telecommunication Service (STS) – Serviciul de Telecomunicații Speciale
- Ministry of National Defence
  - General Directorate for Defense Intelligence (DGIA) – Direcția Generală de Informații a Apărării
- Ministry of Internal Affairs
  - General Directorate for Internal Security (DGPI) – Direcția Generală de Protecție Internă

== Russia ==
- Federal Security Service (FSB) – Федеральная служба безопасности
- Main Directorate of Special Programs of the President of the Russian Federation (GUSP) – Главное управление специальных программ Президента Российской Федерации
- Foreign Intelligence Service (Russia) (SVR) – Служба Внешней Разведки
- Main Intelligence Directorate (GRU) – Главное Разведывательное Управление
- Federal Protective Service (FSO) – Федеральная служба охраны
  - Special Communications Service of Russia – Служба специальной связи и информации

== Rwanda ==
- National Intelligence and Security Service (Rwanda)

== Saudi Arabia ==
- Council of Political and Security Affairs (CPSA) – مجلس الشؤون السياسية والأمنية
- General Intelligence Presidency (GIP) – رئاسة الاستخبارات العامة
- Presidency of State Security (PSS) – رئاسة أمن الدولة
  - Mabahith (GDI) – المباحث العامة
- Saudi Arabia Ministry of Defense (MOD) – وزارة الدفاع
  - Armed Forces Intelligence and Security Commission – هيئة استخبارات وأمن القوات المسلحة
- The National Cyber Security Commission (NCSC) – الهيئة الوطنية للأمن السيبراني

== Serbia ==
Civil Intelligence

- Security and Intelligence Agency – Безбедносно-информативна агенција (BIA)

Military Intelligence

- Military Intelligence Agency – Војнообавештајна агенција (VOA)
- Military Security Agency – Војнобезбедносна агенција (VBA)

== Singapore ==
Ministry of Defense (MINDEF)

- Security and Intelligence Division (SID)

Ministry of Home Affairs (MHA)

- Internal Security Department (ISD)

== Slovakia ==
- Slovak Information Service - Slovenská informačná služba (SIS)
- Military Intelligence - Vojenské spravodajstvo
- National Security Bureau - Národný bezpečnostný úrad (NBÚ)

== Slovenia ==
- Slovenian Intelligence and Security Agency - Slovenska Obveščevalno-Varnostna Agencija (SOVA)
- Intelligence and Security Service of Slovenian Ministry of Defence - Obveščevalno Varnostna Služba (OVS)
- General Staff SAF – Section for intelligence matters – J2 - General štab SV – Sektor za obveščevalne zadeve – J2 (GŠSV-J2)

== Somalia ==
- National Intelligence and Security Agency (NISA)
- Somali National Army military Intelligence (SNAMI)

== South Africa ==
- State Security Agency (SSA)
- South African National Defence Force, Intelligence Division (SANDF-ID)
- Crime Intelligence Division, South African Police Service

== South Korea ==
- National Intelligence Service (NIS)
- Ministry of National Defense (MND)
  - Defense Intelligence Agency (DIA) (military intelligence)
    - Defence Intelligence Command (DIC) (Foreign military intelligence)
    - 777th Command (Signals and Cyber Intelligence)
    - Defense Counterintelligence Headquarters (DCH) (Military counter intelligence)
    - Defense Security Support Group (DSSG) (Security and Security Screening)
  - Defense Investigation Headquarters
    - Security Investigation Group (Security Investigations and Offenses)
- Korean National Police Agency
    - Security Intelligence Bureau (Public safety)
  - National Office of Investigation (NOI)
    - Security Investigation Bureau (SIB) (counter intelligence, counter terrorism)

== Spain ==
- Office of the Prime Minister
  - Department of National Security (DSN)
- Ministry of Defence
  - National Intelligence Centre (CNI)
    - National Cryptologic Center (CCN)
  - Spanish Armed Forces
    - Armed Forces Intelligence Center (CIFAS)
    - Joint Cyberspace Command (MCCE)
- Ministry of the Interior
  - Intelligence Center for Counter-Terrorism and Organized Crime (CITCO)
  - National Police Corps
    - Technological Research Brigade (BIT)
    - General Commissariat of Information - (CGI)
    - General Commissariat of Judiciary Police - (CGPJ)
  - Civil Guard
    - Civil Guard Information Service

== Sri Lanka ==
- State Intelligence Service (Sri Lanka)
- Sri Lanka Police
  - Special Branch/bureau
  - Terrorist Investigation Division
  - Criminal Investigation Department (Sri Lanka)
  - Financial Crimes Investigation Division
- Sri Lanka Army
  - Directorate of Military Intelligence (Sri Lanka)
  - Military Intelligence Corps (Sri Lanka)
- Sri Lanka Navy
  - Department of Naval Intelligence
- Sri Lanka Air Force
  - Directorate of Air Intelligence
- Central Bank of Sri Lanka
  - Financial Intelligence Unit (Sri Lanka),

== Sudan ==
- General Intelligence Service

== Sweden ==
- Swedish Military Intelligence and Security Service – Militära underrättelse - och säkerhetstjänsten (MUST)
  - Office for Special Acquisition – Kontoret för särskild inhämtning (KSI)
- National Defence Radio Establishment – Försvarets Radioanstalt (FRA)
- Swedish Security Service – Säkerhetspolisen (Säpo)

== Switzerland ==
- Federal Department of Defence, Civil Protection and Sports
  - Federal Intelligence Service - Nachrichtendienst des Bundes (NDB)
- Swiss Armed Forces
  - Military Intelligence Service - Militärischer Nachrichtendienst (MND)

== Syria ==
- General Intelligence Service

== Taiwan ==
- National Security Council (NSC)
  - National Security Bureau (NSB)
- Ministry of Justice
  - Investigation Bureau (MJIB)
- Ministry of the Interior
  - National Police Agency (NPA)
- Ministry of Defense
  - Military Police Command (ROCMP)
  - Military Intelligence Bureau (MIB)

== Tajikistan ==
- State Committee for National Security (SCNS) – Кумитаи давлатии амнияти милли (КДАМ)/Государственный комитет национальной безопасности (ГКНБ)

== Tanzania ==
- Tanzania Intelligence and Security Service (TISS)
- Prevention and Combating of Corruption Bureau (PCCB)
- Financial Intelligence Unit (FIU)

== Thailand ==
- Ministry of Foreign Affairs (MFA)
  - News Division
- Ministry of Interior (MOI)
  - Department of Provincial Administration (DOPA)
    - Internal Security Affairs Bureau (ISAB)
- Ministry of Justice (MOJ)
  - Department of Special Investigation (DSI)
    - Bureau of Intelligence (BI)
  - Office of the Narcotics Control Board (ONCB)
    - Intelligence Bureau (IB)
- Ministry of Defence (MOD)
  - Armed Forces Security Center (AFSC)
  - Army Military Intelligence Command (AMIC)
  - Department of Border Affair (DBA)
  - Directorate of Joint Intelligence (DJI)
  - Directorate of Intelligence Royal Thai Army (DINTRTA)
  - Directorate of Intelligence, RTAF (INTELLRTAF)
  - Naval Intelligence Department (NID)
- Office of the Prime Minister (OPM)
  - Anti-Money Laundering Office (AMLO)
    - Financial Intelligence Division (FID)
  - Internal Security Operations Command (ISOC)
  - National Intelligence Agency (NIA)
- Royal Thai Police (RTP)
  - Narcotics Intelligence Division (NID)
  - Special Branch Bureau (SBB)

== Trinidad & Tobago ==
- Strategic Services Agency (SSA)
- Ministry of National Security
  - Trinidad & Tobago Police Service (TTPS)
    - Organised Crime and Intelligence Unit
- Financial Intelligence Unit Trinidad and Tobago (FIUTT)

== Turkey ==
- President of Turkey
  - National Intelligence Organization (MİT)
- Ministry of the Interior
  - Department of Smuggling, Intelligence, Operations and Information Collection (intelligence coordination)
  - Emniyet Genel Müdürlüğü (General Directorate of Security)
    - Emniyet Genel Müdürlüğü İstihbarat Başkanlığı (Intelligence Directorate)
    - Terörle Mücadele Dairesi Başkanlığı(TEM) (Anti-Terrorism Department)
  - Gendarmerie General Command
    - Gendarmerie Intelligence Directorate (Jandarma İstihbarat Başkanlığı) (Intelligence Directorate)
- Ministry of National Defense
  - General Staff Intelligence Directorate (Genelkurmay istihbarat Başkanlığı) (Military İntelligence)
  - Army Intelligence Department (Military İntelligence)
  - Navy Intelligence Department (Military İntelligence)
  - Air Force Intelligence Department (Military İntelligence)

== Turkmenistan ==
- Ministry for National Security (MNS)

== Ukraine ==
- Main Directorate of Intelligence – Holovne Upravlinnya Rozvidky (HUR)
- Foreign Intelligence Service – Sluzhba Zovnishnioyi Rozvidky Ukrayiny (SZR or SZRU)
- State Bureau of Investigation – Derzhavne Biuro Rozsliduvan (DBR)
- Security Service of Ukraine – Sluzhba Bezpeky Ukrayiny (SBU)

== United Arab Emirates ==
- State Security Department (SSD)
- Signals Intelligence Agency (SIA)

== United Kingdom ==
- Joint Intelligence Organisation (JIO) – Joint intelligence analysis.

Domestic intelligence

- Security Service (MI5) – Domestic counter terrorism and counter espionage intelligence gathering and analysis.
- Office for Security and Counter-Terrorism (OSCT) – Counter terrorism and protecting critical national infrastructure.
- National Domestic Extremism and Disorder Intelligence Unit (NDEDIU) – Domestic counter extremism and public disorder intelligence gathering and analysis.
- National Ballistics Intelligence Service (NBIS) – Illegal firearms intelligence analysis.
- National Fraud Intelligence Bureau (NFIB) – Economic crime intelligence gathering and analysis.

Foreign intelligence

- Secret Intelligence Service (SIS)/MI6 – Foreign intelligence gathering and analysis.
- Defence Intelligence (DI) – Military intelligence analysis.

Signals intelligence

- Government Communications Headquarters (GCHQ) – Signals intelligence gathering and analysis.

Criminal Intelligence and Protected Persons

- National Crime Agency (NCA) – Organised crime intelligence gathering and analysis. Agency utilizes Unexplained wealth orders and the Investigatory Powers Act 2016. NCA officers are posted overseas in around 50 countries. They operate the UK Protected Persons Service, which includes witness protection.

== United States ==
- Office of the Director of National Intelligence (ODNI)
- Central Intelligence Agency (CIA)
- United States Department of Defense (DOD)
  - Defense Intelligence Agency (DIA)
  - National Security Agency (NSA)
  - National Geospatial-Intelligence Agency (NGA)
  - National Reconnaissance Office (NRO)
  - Military Intelligence Corps (MIC)
  - Marine Corps Intelligence (MCI)
  - Office of Naval Intelligence (ONI)
  - Sixteenth Air Force (16 AF)
  - Space Delta 18 (DEL 18)
- United States Department of Energy (DOE)
  - Office of Intelligence and Counterintelligence (OICI)
- United States Department of Homeland Security (DHS)
  - Coast Guard Intelligence (CGI)
  - DHS Office of Intelligence and Analysis (I&A)
- United States Department of Justice (DOJ)
  - DEA Office of National Security Intelligence (ONSI)
  - Federal Bureau of Investigation (FBI)
    - FBI Intelligence Branch (IB)
- United States Department of State (DOS)
  - Bureau of Intelligence and Research (INR)
- United States Department of the Treasury (USDT)
  - Office of Terrorism and Financial Intelligence (TFI)

== Uruguay ==
- National State Intelligence System - Sistema Nacional de Inteligencia de Estado (SNIE)
  - State Secretariat of Strategic Intelligence - Secretaría de Inteligencia Estratégica de Estado (SIEE)
- National Police of Uruguay
  - National Directorate of Information and Intelligence - Dirección Nacional de Información e Inteligencia (DNII)

== Uzbekistan ==
- State Security Service - Davlat Xavfsizlik Xizmati (DXX)/ Служба государственной безопасности (СГБ)

== Venezuela ==
- Bolivarian National Intelligence Service - Servicio Bolivariano de Inteligencia (SEBIN)
- Directorate General of Military Intelligence – Dirección General de Contrainteligencia Militar (DGCIM)

== Vietnam ==
- Ministry of National Defence - People's Army of Vietnam
  - General Department of Defence Intelligence (GDDI)/General Department II - Tổng cục Tình báo Quốc phòng (TBQP)/Tổng cục II (TC2)
- Ministry of Public Security - People's Public Security of Vietnam
  - Department of Information Processing and Intelligence Support (B01)/Cục Xử lý tin và hỗ trợ tình báo (B01)
  - Asia Intelligence Bureau (B02)/Cục Tình báo châu Á (B02)
  - US, Europe, Africa Intelligence Service (B03)/Cục Tình báo Mỹ - Âu - Phi (B03)
  - Bureau of Secret Intelligence (B04)/Cục Tình báo phương thức mật (B04)
  - Bureau of Economic, Scientific, Technical and Environmental Intelligence (B05)/Cục Tình báo kinh tế, khoa học, kỹ thuật và môi trường(B05)

== Yemen ==
- Central State Security Agency
- Political Security Organization (PSO)
- National Security Bureau (NSB)

== Zimbabwe ==
- Central Intelligence Organisation (CIO)

== European Union ==
- European Union Intelligence Centre (EU INTCEN)
  - Counter Terrorism Group (CTG)
- European Union Military Staff (EUMS)
- European Union Satellite Centre (EU SatCen)

== Shanghai Cooperation Organisation ==
- Regional Anti-Terrorist Structure (RATS)

== See also ==
- List of defunct intelligence agencies
- List of fictional secret police and intelligence organizations
- List of intelligence gathering disciplines
- List of special reconnaissance units
- List of police tactical units
- List of law enforcement agencies
- List of protective service agencies
- List of secret police organizations
- List of counterintelligence organizations
- List of military special forces units
