= Security agency =

Governmental organization that conducts intelligence activities

A security agency is a governmental organization that conducts intelligence activities for the internal security of a state. They are the domestic cousins of foreign intelligence agencies, and typically conduct counterintelligence to thwart other countries' foreign intelligence efforts.

The United States Federal Bureau of Investigation (FBI) is an internal intelligence, security and law enforcement agency, while the Central Intelligence Agency (CIA) is an external intelligence service, which deals primarily with intelligence collection overseas. A similar relationship exists in Britain between the Security Service (MI5) and the Secret Intelligence Service (MI6).

The distinction, or overlap, between security agencies, national police, and gendarmerie organizations varies by country. In the United States, one organization, the FBI, is a national police, an internal security agency, and a counterintelligence agency. In other countries, separate agencies exist, although the nature of their work causes them to interact. In France, the Police nationale and the Gendarmerie nationale both handle policing duties, and the Direction centrale du renseignement intérieur handles counterintelligence. Some nations, such as the Netherlands, Spain, and Turkey, have one agency that is responsible for both security and intelligence.

Likewise, the distinction, or overlap, between military and civilian security agencies varies between countries. In the United States, the FBI and CIA are civilian agencies, although they have various paramilitary traits and have professional relationships with the U.S.'s military intelligence organizations. In many countries all intelligence efforts answer to the military, whether by official design or at least on a de facto basis. Countries where various military and civilian agencies divide responsibilities tend to reorganize their efforts over the decades to force the various agencies to cooperate more effectively, integrating (or at least coordinating) their efforts with some unified directorate. For example, after many years of turf wars, the member agencies of the United States Intelligence Community are now coordinated by the Director of National Intelligence, with the hope to reduce stovepiping of information.

In Ireland, intelligence operations relevant to internal security are conducted by the military (G2) and police (SDU), rather than civilian agencies.

Security agencies frequently have "security", "intelligence" or "service" in their names. Private organizations that provide services similar to a security agency might be called a "security company" or "security service", but those terms can also be used for organizations that have nothing to do with intelligence gathering.

== Security agencies ==
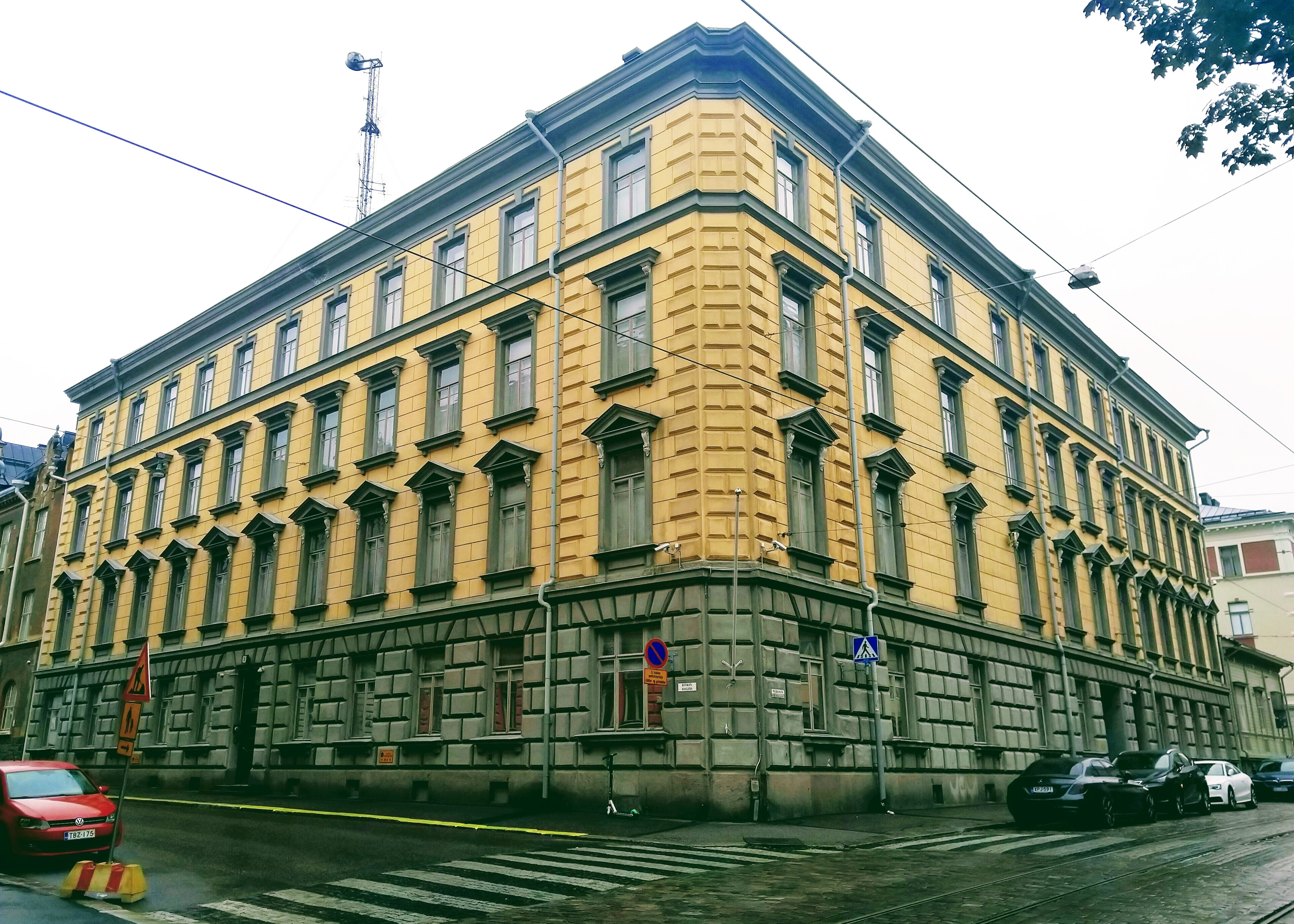
The headquarters of the Finnish Security Intelligence Service or SUPO in Punavuori, Helsinki

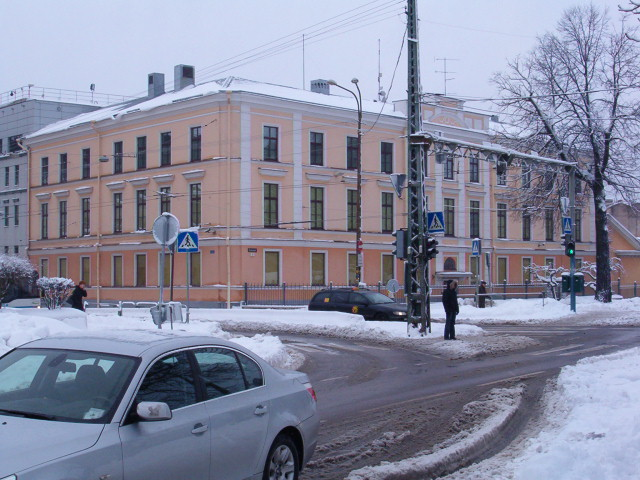
Estonian KAPO headquarters in Kassisaba, Kesklinn, Tallinn

- Afghanistan : General Directorate of Intelligence
- Armenia: National Security Service
- Australia:
  - Australian Security Intelligence Organisation
  - Australian Secret Intelligence Service
- Bahrain: National Security Agency
- Bangladesh: National Security Intelligence (NSI)
- Belarus: State Security Agency of the Republic of Belarus (KDB or KGB)
- Bosnia and Herzegovina: Intelligence-Security Agency of Bosnia and Herzegovina
- Brazil Federal Police
- Brunei: Internal Security Department (Brunei)
- Canada: Canadian Security Intelligence Service, successor of RCMP Security Service
- China: Ministry of State Security (China)
- Croatia: Military Security and Intelligence Agency (Croatian: Vojna sigurnosno-obavještajna agencija or VSOA or VSA) and Security and Intelligence Agency (Croatian: Sigurnosno-obavještajna agencija ili SOA)
- East Germany (former): Stasi
- Estonia: Estonian Internal Security Service (KAPO)
- Ethiopia:
  - National Intelligence and Security Service (NISS)
  - Koree Nageenyaa (in Oromia)
- European Union: European Union Agency for Network and Information Security (ENISA, originally European Network and Information Security Agency)
- Finland: Finnish Security Intelligence Service (SUPO)
- France: functions divided between Police nationale, Gendarmerie nationale, and Direction générale de la Sécurité intérieure
- Germany: Federal Office for the Protection of the Constitution (Germany), Bundeskriminalamt
- India:
  - Ministry of Home Affairs
    - Intelligence Bureau (India)
    - National Investigation Agency
  - Ministry of Finance
    - Enforcement Directorate
    - Directorate of Revenue Intelligence
    - Economic Intelligence Council
    - Directorate General of GST Intelligence
- Indonesia: Indonesian State Intelligence Agency
- Ireland:
  - Directorate of Military Intelligence (Ireland)
  - Special Detective Unit, formerly the Special Branch and before that the Criminal Investigation Department (CID)
- Israel: Shin Bet (Israel Security Agency (ISA)) and others: see Israeli Intelligence Community
- Italy: Internal Intelligence and Security Agency
- Japan: Public Security Intelligence Agency (PSIA)
- Malaysia: Royal Malaysian Police Special Branch
- Netherlands: General Intelligence and Security Service
- New Zealand: New Zealand Security Intelligence Service
- Nigeria: State Security Service (SSS)
- Norway: Norwegian Police Security Service
- Oman: Internal Security Service
- Pakistan:
  - Inter-Services Intelligence - ISI
  - Intelligence Bureau (Pakistan)
  - Federal Investigation Agency
  - Pakistan Maritime Security Agency
- Poland: Agencja Bezpieczeństwa Wewnętrznego
- Portugal:
  - Sistema de Informações da República Portuguesa (SIRP)
  - former: PIDE, or Polícia Internacional e de Defesa do Estado
- Russia:
  - Federal Security Service of the Russian Federation (FSB), successor of Federal Counterintelligence Service (FSK), successor of KGB
  - Main Directorate of Special Programs of the President of the Russian Federation
  - Main Intelligence Directorate (Russia)
- Serbia: Security and Intelligence Agency (BIA), Military Security Agency (VBA)
- Singapore: Internal Security Department (Singapore)
- Slovenia: Slovenian Intelligence and Security Agency
- Somalia: National Intelligence and Security Agency (NISA) (Somali: Hay'ada Sirdoonka iyo Nabadsugida)
- Soviet Union (former):
  - Cheka
  - State Political Directorate (GPU)
  - People's Commissariat for Internal Affairs (NKVD) which became Ministry for Internal Affairs (MVD)
  - People's Commissariat for State Security (NKGB) which became Ministry for State Security (MGB)
  - SMERSH
  - KGB, Komitet gosudarstvennoy bezopasnosti (Russian: Комите́т госуда́рственной безопа́сности (КГБ)
- South Africa: State Security Agency (South Africa)
- Spain (all the following agencies have security and security intelligence functions):
  - Centro Nacional de Inteligencia (CNI)
  - General Commissariat of Information (CGI)
  - General Commissariat of Judiciary Police (CGPJ)
  - Civil Guard Information Service (SIGC)
- Sri Lanka: State Intelligence Service (Sri Lanka) (SIS)
- Sweden: Swedish Security Service (Säkerhetspolisen, SÄPO)
- Switzerland: Intelligence Service of the Federation (Nachrichtendienst des Bundes)
- Turkey: The National Intelligence Organization (Millî İstihbarat Teşkilâtı, MIT)
- Ukraine: Security Service of Ukraine
- United Kingdom (all the following agencies have security and security intelligence functions):
  - The Security Service (MI5)
  - The Secret Intelligence Service (SIS)
  - Government Communications Headquarters (GCHQ)
  - Defence Intelligence (DI)
  - National Crime Agency (NCA)
- United States (all the following agencies have security and security intelligence functions):
  - Central Security Service
  - Federal Bureau of Investigation
  - Defense Counterintelligence and Security Agency
  - National Security Agency
  - Defense Intelligence Agency
- Vietnam: Ministry of Public Security (Bộ Công an, BCA)

== See also ==
- International security
- List of intelligence agencies
- Secret service
