= National Security Council (Croatia) =

The National Security Council (Croatian: Vijeće za nacionalnu sigurnost) is the central coordinating body of the Croatian security and intelligence system, composed of the President of the Republic, the President of the Government, the Minister of Defense, the Minister of the Interior, the Minister of Foreign Affairs and European Integration, the Minister of Justice, National Security Advisor to the President of the Republic, the Chief of the General Staff of the Armed Forces of the Republic of Croatia, the Director of SOA, the Director of VSOA and the Head of Office of the National Security Council. The President of the Croatian Parliament also take part in the work of the National Security Council, and if necessary other people as well.

The National Security Council was established on 26 March 2002. According to the Homeland Security System Act of 2017, National Security Council "investigates and assesses security threats and risks, matters within the purview of the state government bodies pertaining to national security, and issues guidelines, decrees and briefs on the ways of protecting and furthering the interests of national security, related also to the homeland security system".

== See also ==
- Croatian security and intelligence system
