= Operation "Damask" (2014) =

Operation Damask
Date	3 September–November 2014
Location	Bosnia and Herzegovina
Result	Successful: Many Islamists arrested

Belligerents
Bosnia and Herzegovina; Police of BiH; SIPA; OSA BiH	Islamic State

Commanders and leaders
Goran Zubac	Unknown

Strength
Over 200 policemen	Unknown

Casualties and losses
None	27 arrested (16 in the first raid; 11 in the second raid)

Operation Damask was an action by the State Investigation and Protection Agency (SIPA) and Police of BiH against the Wahhabis and Islamic State recruits.

== Background ==
Since the start of 2014 around 340 young men have left Bosnia to fight in Syria and Iraq for the Islamic State. In September 2014 the Police of BiH, SIPA and The Intelligence-Security Agency (OSA/OBA BiH) began a counter-terrorist operation in an attempt to arrest the suspects who funded the terrorism. But first a Criminal Code had to be passed to even carry out the Operation, which was adopted by Parliament under strong international pressure.

== Operation ==
=== First wave ===
The operation began on 3 September 2014, the operation was led by SIPA with the help of the Bosnian Police against the Islamic State (IS) recruits and funders. The goal was to stop the terroristic threat for the IS. By the 5 September, Already captured 16 of them, including Husein Bilal Bosnić. On 5 September the Prosecutor's Office of BiH requested a pre-trial detention for key suspects. In October the Prosecutors asked the State Court to extend detention for Bosnić and four others.

=== Second wave ===
In November 2014 SIPA organized the last wave of the operation, during the operation, 11 people were arrested and given to the Prosecutor's office.

== Aftermath ==
In early December, some suspects were released with some restrictions. Bosnić, the main suspect was given 7 years in prison. Thanks to the operation, Flights to Syria reduced.
