= List of counterintelligence organizations =

Counterintelligence organizations and agencies attempt to prevent foreign intelligence organizations from successfully gathering and collecting intelligence against the governments they serve.

== Active counterintelligence organizations ==
Currently active counterintelligence organizations include the following. For former agencies, see the separate list below.

Australia

- Australian Security Intelligence Organisation (ASIO)
- Australian Secret Intelligence Service (ASIS)
- Defence Intelligence Organisation (DIO)

Bangladesh

- National Security Intelligence (NSI)
- Directorate General of Forces Intelligence (DGFI)

Belarus

- State Security Committee of the Republic of Belarus

Belgium

- General Intelligence and Security Service (GISS)
- Veiligheid van de Staat - Sûreté de l'Etat (VSSE)

Brazil

- Agência Brasileira de Inteligência (ABIN)
- Gabinete de Segurança Institucional da Presidência da República (GSI)

Brunei

- Jabatan Keselamatan Dalam Negeri (JKDN)

Cambodia

- Cambodian National Police Central Security Department (CSD)
- Military Intelligence Department (MID)

Canada

- Canadian Security Intelligence Service (CSIS)
- Canadian Forces National Counter-Intelligence Unit (CFNCIU), operated by the Canadian Forces Military Police Group

China

- Ministry of State Security (MSS)
- Ministry of Public Security (MPS)
  - Political Security Protection Bureau

Croatia

- Security and Intelligence Agency (SOA)
- Military Security and Intelligence Agency (VSOA)

Czech Republic

- Bezpečnostní informační služba (BIS) — Security Information Service

Denmark

- Politiets Efterretningstjeneste (PET)

Estonia

- Estonian Internal Security Service (KaPo)

Finland

- Finnish Security Intelligence Service (SuPo)

France

- Directorate-General for External Security (DGSE)
- Directorate-General for Internal Security (DGSI)
- Directorate of Military Intelligence (DRM)
- DRSD

Germany

- Bundesamt für Verfassungsschutz (BfV)
- Bundesnachrichtendienst (BND)
- Militärischer Abschirmdienst (MAD)

Greece

- Elliniki Astynomia Dieufthinsi Esoterikon Hypotheseon (DEH)
- Hellenic National Intelligence Service (NIS-EYP) Sub-Directorate for International Terrorism and Organized Crime

Hungary

- Constitution Protection Office (Hungary) (NBH)

Iceland

- Greiningardeild Ríkislögreglustjóra - National Security Unit

India

- Central Bureau of Investigation (CBI)
- Directorate of Air Intelligence (A.I.)
- Directorate of Military Intelligence (M.I.)
- Directorate of Naval Intelligence (N.I.)
- Directorate of Revenue Intelligence (DRI)
- Intelligence Bureau (IB)
- Research and Analysis Wing (RAW)

Indonesia

- Badan Intelijen Negara (BIN)
- Badan Intelijen Strategis Tentara Nasional Indonesia (BAIS TNI)
- Kejaksaan Agung Republik Indonesia (KARI)
- Pusat Intelijen TNI Angkatan Darat abbreviated (Pusintelad)

Iran

- Farmândehiye Entezâmiye Jomhuriye Eslâmiye Irân (Faraja)
- Oghab 2
- Parallel Intelligence Organization (PIO)
- Rêxistina Dijî Îstîxbarata Pasdaran (RDIP)
- Rêxistina Kontraîstixbarata Arteş (RKA)
- Vezarat-e Ettela'at Jomhuri-ye Eslami-ye Iran (VAJA)
- SAHEFAJA

Ireland

- Crime and Security Branch (CSB)
- G2

Israel

- Aman
- Mossad
- Shin Bet (a.k.a. Shabak)

Italy

- Department of Information for Security (DIS)
- External Intelligence and Security Agency (AISE)
- Joint Intelligence Centre (CII)

Japan

- Air Intelligence Wing (AIW) (作戦情報隊)
- Cabinet Intelligence and Research Office (CIRO)
- Defense Intelligence Headquarters (DIH)
- Fleet Intelligence Command (FIC)
- JSDF Intelligence Security Command (JISC) (自衛隊情報保全隊)
- Military Intelligence Command (MIC)
- Foreign Affairs and Intelligence Department (FAID)
- Public Security Bureau (PSB)
- Public Security Intelligence Agency (PSIA)
- Security and Intelligence Division (SID) (警備情報課)

Kenya

- National Security Intelligence Service (NSIS)

Lebanon

- Special Agency to Combat Terrorism

Malaysia

- Cawangan Khas (CK)
- Bahagian Penyelidikan Jabatan Perdana Menteri (BPJPM)
- Kor Risik Diraja (KRD)
- Pertubuhan Perisikan Pertahanan Malaysia (PPPM)

Myanmar

- Bureau of Special Investigation (BSI)
- Office of the Chief of Military Security Affairs (OCMSA)

Netherlands

- Algemene Inlichtingen- en Veiligheidsdienst (AIVD) — General Intelligence and Security Service
- Militaire Inlichtingen- en Veiligheidsdienst (MIVD) — Military Intelligence and Security Service

New Zealand

- Directorate of Defence Intelligence and Security (DDIS)
- New Zealand Security Intelligence Service (NZSIS)
- Threat Assessment Unit (TAU)

North Korea

- Reconnaissance General Bureau (RGB)

Pakistan

- Directorate General Air Intelligence (AI)
- Directorate-General for the Naval Intelligence (NI)
- Intelligence Bureau (IB)
- Inter-Services Intelligence (ISI)
- Pakistan Army Corps of Military Intelligence (MI)

Philippines

- 300th Air Intelligence and Security Wing (300th AISW)
- Army Intelligence Regiment (AIR)
- Counter Intelligence Command, Armed Forces of the Philippine (CIC)
- Integrity Monitoring and Enforcement Group (IMEG)
- National Intelligence Coordinating Agency (NICA)
- Naval Intelligence and Security Force (NISF)
- Presidential Intelligence Company (PIC)

Poland

- Internal Security Agency (ABW)
- Military Counterintelligence Service (SKW)

Portugal

- Military Security and Informations Center (CISMIL)
- Informations System of the Portuguese Republic (SIRP)

Romania

- Serviciul Român de Informaţii (SRI)
- Directorate for Military Security

Russian Federation

- Federal Security Service (FSB)
- Foreign Intelligence Service (SVR)
- Main Directorate of the General Staff of the Armed Forces of the Russian Federation (GRU)

Serbia

- Bezbednosno-informativna agencija (BIA)
- Vojnobezbednosna agencija (VBA), Military Security Agency (successor of Yugoslav Kontraobaveštajna služba)

Sweden

- Militära underrättelse- och säkerhetstjänsten (MUST) — Military Intelligence and Security Service
- Säkerhetspolisen (SÄPO) — Swedish Security Service

Switzerland

- Fedpol
- Federal Intelligence Service (FIS)
- Militärischer Nachrichtendienst (MND)

Slovakia

- Národný bezpečnostný úrad (NBÚ) — National Security Bureau

South Africa

- Defence Intelligence Division (DID)
- National Intelligence Agency (NIA)
- State Security Agency (SSA)
- South African Secret Service (SASS)

South Korea

- Defense Counterintelligence Command (DCC)
- Defense Intelligence Agency (DIA)
- Naval Intelligence Group (NIG)
- National Intelligence Service (NIS)
- National Police Agency Intelligence Bureau (IB)

Thailand

- Armed Forces Security Center (AFSC)
- Army Military Intelligence Command (AMIC)
- Directorate of Intelligence, Royal Thai Air Force (INTELLRTAF)
- Directorate of Joint Intelligence (DJI)
- DSI Counterintelligence Section
- Internal Security Affairs Bureau (ISAB)
- Internal Security Operations Command (ISOC)
- National Intelligence Agency (NIA)
- Naval Intelligence Department (NID)
- Royal Thai Police Special Branch Bureau (SBB)

Turkey

- Donanma İstihbarat Dairesi (DİD)
- Hava Kuvvetleri İstihbarat Dairesi (HKİD)
- Higher Counterterrorism Council
- Jandarma İstihbarat Müdürlüğü (JİM)
- Millî İstihbarat Teşkilatı (MIT)
- Ordu İstihbarat Dairesi (OİD)

Ukraine

- Foreign Intelligence Service of Ukraine (SZRU)
- HUR MO
- Security Service of Ukraine (SBU)

United Kingdom

- Royal Air Force Police No. 2 Counter Intelligence and Security Squadron
- Defence Intelligence (DI)
- Security Service, commonly known as MI5
- National Domestic Extremism and Disorder Intelligence Unit (NDEDIU)

United States

- FBI Counterintelligence Division (FBI)
- United States Army Counterintelligence (ACI)
- Air Force Office of Special Investigations (AFOSI)
- DIA's Defense Counterintelligence and Human Intelligence Center (DCHC)
- Diplomatic Security Service (DSS), U.S. Department of State (DS/ICI/CI)
- Naval Criminal Investigative Service (NCIS, formerly NIS)
- United States Marine Corps Counterintelligence
- Office of the National Counterintelligence Executive (ONCIX)
- Central Intelligence Agency (CIA)
- National Security Agency (NSA)

Vietnam

- General Department of Defence Intelligence (GDDI)

== Defunct counterintelligence organizations ==
These organizations are now defunct, possibly absorbed by a successor organization:

Ireland

- Army Intelligence Department
- Criminal Investigation Department (CID)

Nazi Germany

- Geheime Staatspolizei (Gestapo)
- Geheime Feldpolizei (GFP) (Secret Field Police) (1939-1945)
- Sicherheitsdienst — Security Service of the SS, particularly the "inland SS" branch
- Abwehr (military intelligence)

Empire of Japan

- Kenpeitai - Army military police
- Tokubetsu Keisatsutai - Navy military police
- Tokubetsu Kōtō Keisatsu (特別高等警察, Special Higher Police) - civil police

Poland

- Wojskowe Służby Informacyjne (WSI) — dissolved in 2006 for having been involved in illegal activities

Yugoslavia

- Kontraobaveštajna služba (KOS), Army Counter-Intelligence Service
- Uprava Državne Bezbednosti (UDBA), State Security Directorate

Soviet Union and Imperial Russia

- Committee for State Security (KGB) — previously MGB, NKVD, OGPU, Cheka, and, during imperial times, Okhrana
- SMERSH

South Korea

- Defense Security Command— dissolved in 2018

Ukraine

- Kontrrazvedka, Makhnovist counterintelligence agency

United Kingdom

- 14 Intelligence Company — also known as "the Det"

United States

- Army Counter Intelligence Corps
- Counterintelligence Field Activity
