= Croatian security and intelligence system =

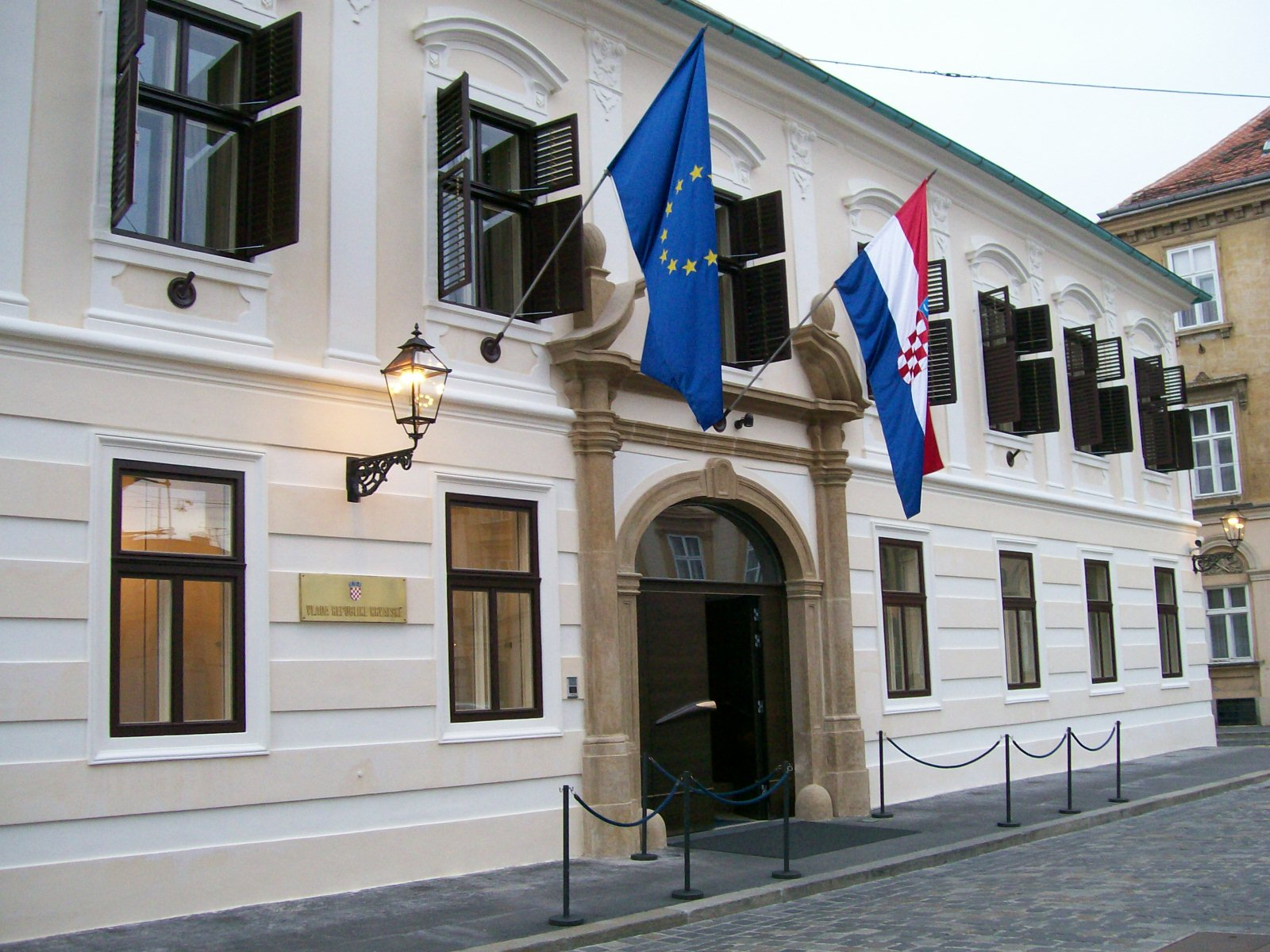
The Government of Croatia has been headquartered in the Banski dvori since 1990.

The intelligence community of Croatia consists of two main security and intelligence agencies:

- Security and Intelligence Agency (Croatian: Sigurnosno-obavještajna agencija or SOA): the civilian foreign intelligence service of the Croatian government.
- Military Security and Intelligence Agency (Croatian: Vojna sigurnosno-obavještajna agencija or VSOA): the counterintelligence agency for the Croatian Armed Forces.

Their work is overseen by the Croatian Parliament, the President of the Republic, the Government, the Office of the National Security Council and the Council for the civilian scrutiny of the security intelligence agencies. The community of intelligence agencies, military and civilian, was established by Croatia during the Croatian War of Independence, becoming integral to the modern Croatian Armed Forces. Total security and intelligence spending is $66.7 billion.

== Organization ==
According to the Constitution of Croatia, the President of the Republic and the Prime Minister cooperate in directing the operations of the security services. The appointment of directors of security agencies is counter-signed by the President and the Prime Minister, upon a prior opinion of the Domestic Policy and National Security Committee of the Croatian Parliament.

=== National Security Council ===
Tasks of cooperation between President of the Republic and the Prime Minister in directing the work of security and intelligence agencies, is within the competence of the National Security Council (Vijeće za nacionalnu sigurnost). Members of NSC are the President of the Republic, the President of the Government, Minister of Defense, Minister of the Interior, Minister of Foreign Affairs and European Integration, Minister of Justice, National Security Advisor to the President of the Republic, the Chief of the General Staff of the Armed Forces of the Republic of Croatia, the Head of UVNS, the Directors of SOA and VSOA, the President of the Parliament also takes part in its work, and if necessary other people as well.

=== Council for the Coordination of Security and Intelligence Services ===
The Council for the Coordination of Security Intelligence Services (Savjet za koordinaciju sigurnosno-obavještajnih agencija) is responsible for the operational coordination of the work of security intelligence agencies. Members of the Council are the Member of the Government responsible for national security, as the Chairperson of the Council; the National Security Advisor to the President of the Republic, as Deputy Chairperson; the Directors of security and intelligence agencies and the Head of UVNS. If necessary, other persons from judicial, police, inspection, oversight and other entities and institutions may take part in the meetings of the Council.

=== Office of the National Security Council ===
The Office of the National Security Council (Ured Vijeća za nacionalnu sigurost or UVNS) is the body of the Croatian security and intelligence system which provides support in the field of national security for major state institutions. The UVNS has three major duties: support for the National Security Council and Council for the Coordination of Security Services; analysis of the Agencies' reports and expert scrutiny of the work of the security and intelligence agencies and OTC; information security - NSA.

=== Security and Intelligence Agency ===
The Security and Intelligence Agency (SOA) systematically collects, analyzes and processes data significant for the national security. SOA endeavours to detect and prevent activities aimed at threatening the independence and sovereignty of the Republic of Croatia, violent subversion of state authorities, basic freedom and human rights guaranteed by the Constitution and other laws, and the basic economic system of the Republic of Croatia.

Abroad, SOA systematically collects, analyzes, processes and evaluates the political, economic, security and military data relating to foreign countries, international governmental and non-governmental organizations, political, military and economic alliances, groups and individuals exhibiting intentions, capabilities, covert plans and secret activities aimed at threatening the national security.

=== Military Security and Intelligence Agency ===
The Military Security and Intelligence Agency (VSOA) is a unit that falls within the Ministry of Defence. In its intelligence operations VSOA collects, analyzes, processes and evaluates data on military forces and defence systems of other countries, on external pressures which may influence the defence security, as well as on activities abroad, aimed at threatening the defence security of the country. VSOA, on the territory of the Republic of Croatia, collects, analyzes processes and evaluates data on the intentions, capabilities and plans made by persons, groups, and organizations in the country with the intention of threatening the defence power of the country; and takes necessary measures to detect, monitor and counteract these activities.

=== Information Systems Security Bureau ===
The Information Systems Security Bureau (Zavod za sigurnost informacijskih sustava or ZSIS) is the central state authority responsible for the technical areas of information security of the state bodies. The director of ZSIS is appointed by the Government, at the proposal of the Council for the Coordination of Security Intelligence Agencies.

=== Operational Technology Centre for the Surveillance of Telecommunications ===
The Operational Technology Centre for the Surveillance of Telecommunications (Croatian: Operativno-tehnički centar za nadzor telekomunikacija or OTC) is a small agency in the frame of the Croatian intelligence and security community responsible for activation and management of the measures of secret surveillance of telecommunication services. The director of OTC is appointed by the Government, at the proposal of the Council for the Coordination of Security Intelligence Agencies.

== Oversight ==
The work of security and intelligence agencies is subject to the scrutiny conducted by the Croatian Parliament (parliamentary scrutiny), the Office of the National Security Council (professional scrutiny) and the Council for the Civilian Scrutiny of Security and Intelligence Agencies (civilian scrutiny).

Aside the above-mentioned scrutiny there is within each agency a special organisational unit responsible for the scrutiny of the work of its employees.

=== Parliamentary scrutiny ===
The scrutiny of the Croatian Parliament over security intelligence agencies is conducted directly or through the Parliamentary Committee for Domestic Policy and National Security (Croatian: Odbor za unutarnju politiku i nacionalnu sigurnost), and the Council for the Civilian Scrutiny of the Security Intelligence Agencies.

=== Professional scrutiny ===
Professional scrutiny over the work of security intelligence agencies and of the OTC is performed by the Office of the National Security Council.

=== Civilian scrutiny ===
Croatia is one of few countries where the civilian scrutiny over the agencies work is conducted along with the parliamentary and professional scrutiny. For the purpose of ensuring of the civilian scrutiny over the work of security intelligence agencies in 2002 was established the Council for Civilian Scrutiny of Security and Intelligence Agencies (Croatian: Vijeće za građanski nadzor sigurnosno-obavještajnih agencija) pursuant to the Security Services Act of 28 March 2002. The Council consists of a chairperson and six members, all of whom are appointed by the Croatian Parliament. The Council's chairperson and members are appointed for a term of four years, after which they may be re-appointed. The Council monitors the legality of the work of security agencies, monitors and oversees application of measures for confidential data gathering which limits constitutionally-guaranteed human rights and fundamental freedoms.

== History ==
After the first democratic, multiparty elections held in 1990, the process of building state institutions commenced within the framework of newly-sovereign Croatia.

=== Early 1990s ===
On 27 May 1991, President Franjo Tuđman established the Bureau for the Protection of the Constitutional Order (Ured za zaštitu ustavnog poretka or UZUP). The scope of its work, and its primary task was providing advice and professional assistance, in the area of protection of the constitutional order, to competent authorities performing functions in the Ministry of Interior, the Ministry of Defence and the Ministry of Foreign Affairs. As a part of the system for the protection of constitutional order, the Bureau was responsible for coordinating and directing the system as a whole. The Service for the Protection of the Constitutional Order, in the framework of the MoI, the Security and Information Service in the MoD, and the Research and Documentation Service of the MFA were all obliged to report to the Bureau on their respective work and results. The Bureau reported to the President of the Republic and to the top state authorities. These authorities, i.e. their services, were the foundation of the system for the protection of the constitutional order.

=== 1993–2002 ===
The main tasks of the intelligence community in the 1990s included the protection of the sovereignty and territorial integrity of the Republic of Croatia (liberation of the occupied territories of Croatia), problems of regional security (resolution of the crises in Bosnia and Herzegovina), international terrorism and organized crime, counter-intelligence protection. From the beginning, the focus of the intelligence work of the intelligence community was the territorial integrity of Croatia and regional stability, and two thirds of the operations and projects was devoted to these goals. Only one third of the capacity was directed toward international terrorism, organized crime and counter-intelligence protection.

==== National Security Office ====
UZUP ceased to exist on 21 March 1993 when, by the decision of the President Tuđman, the National Security Office (Ured za nacionalnu sigurnost or UNS) was established as the executive state authority which coordinated, directed, and supervised the work of government services whose activities were connected to national security.

Two years later, on 17 May 1995, the Croatian Parliament adopted the National Security Office Act. In only 17 short articles, the tasks of UNS were outlined as were the details of its internal structure. According to that Act, three services were founded and fall under its jurisdiction:

- Croatian Intelligence Service (Hrvatska izvještajna služba or HIS),
- Security Headquarters (Stožer osiguranja),
- Supervision Service (Nadzorna služba).

In order to perform the professional and technical activities of the National Security Office, the following services (or its organizational units) were formed:

- National Center for Electronic Monitoring (Nacionalna služba elektroničkog izviđanja or NSEI), which was operationally linked to the Croatian Army's Central Signals Intelligence Service and provided both internal and external signals intelligence. The NSEI was directly responsible to the Director of the UNS and the Joint National Security Committee.
- Intelligence Academy (Obavještajna akademija).

This two services were not regulated by any legislative acts, rather only by the acts on internal organization.

The Director of the UNS, appointed by the President, was responsible to the President of the Republic for the work of the UNS and the individual services of the National Security Office.

The Directors were:

- Hrvoje Šarinić
- Krunislav Olujić
- Miroslav Tuđman – acting
- Luka Bebić
- Ivan Jarnjak
- Tomislav Karamarko

==== Intelligence Community ====
The intelligence community goals and tasks were set by the Joint National Security Committee (SONS) and the Intelligence Community Coordination Committee (KOOZ). SONS was in charge of directing and coordinating state ministries in conducting national security operations, whereas KOOZ was responsible for the execution of tasks given by SONS.

The core of the intelligence community consisted of four intelligence agencies:

- Croatian Intelligence Service (HIS), the foreign intelligence and analysis agency; it was the only agency authorized to conduct operations abroad, permitted to co-operate with the agencies of friendly nations.
- Service for the Protection of the Constitutional Order (Croatian: Služba za zaštitu ustavnog poretka (SZUP)), the domestic intelligence and internal security agency. For a time it was the country's main agency for both internal and foreign intelligence.
- Security Intelligence Service of the Ministry of Defence (Croatian: Sigurnosno-informativna služba, SIS)
- Directorate of Intelligence Affairs of the Croatian Army Headquarters (ObU GSOSRH)

In addition, part of the community was the Ministry of Defence's Department of International Military Co-operation, which was not an intelligence agency as such but it collected intelligence data through official diplomatic and military contacts, as well as through official contacts through military envoys and attaches of Croatia's government.

The Croatian President provided guidelines for UNS and the Croatian intelligence community operations. The UNS director and state ministers assigned tasks to the services under their authority. The yearly operational plan of the intelligence community was prepared by KOOZ and it included projects and operative actions in which two or more services were required to take part. SONS approved the yearly operational plan of the intelligence community and supervised its implementation. Aside from the above-mentioned UNS and the agencies, a wider security-system circle also included the Criminal Police, the Military Police, the Customs Service, and the Financial Police, whose representatives could be invited to participate in the KOOZ sessions.

During the 1990s, and especially after the war, the state used the intelligence agencies for political purposes-not only to harass the opposition but also - in the case of certain high-ranking members of the Croatian government - as a means of shoring up their own power against that of others within the inner circle. These services, chiefly the SZUP, the SIS, and the HIS (headed by Tuđman's son Miroslav Tuđman), were used for political manipulation, blackmail, and by insiders to facilitate lining their own pockets through insider knowledge of privatization deals. At one point, there were even allegations that the services were misused in a Croatian soccer championship to help the team favored by Tuđman, an ardent soccer fan.

The complete cadre of the SIS was taken from the former Socialist Republic of Croatia's Republička služba državne sigurnosti, commonly known as UDBA, whose orders were given by the Federal Service Center in Belgrade. The transfer was made thanks to its leader Josip Perković and his informal agreement with Franjo Tuđman. From Ministry of Internior, the Service went under jurisdiction of Croatian Ministry of Defence. It was initially politicized, supporting the ruling HDZ party and its control over the military. The SIS was restructured and de-politicized after the end of the war, diversifying its operations and departments to include the Croatian Navy and the Croatian Air Force, counterintelligence, criminal investigations and security for Croatia's military leaders. Although responsible solely for defense intelligence, the SIS was believed to have conducted intelligence gathering operations in foreign countries of importance to Croatia.

=== 2002–2006 ===
Emblem of the Croatian Intelligence Agency

As parliamentary democracy developed in the Republic of Croatia, reforms in security system were continued. On 19 March 2002, the Croatian Parliament adopted the National Security Strategy. The new Strategy, which is oriented toward integration into NATO and the EU, recognized all the neighboring states, including the Federal Republic of Yugoslavia (now Serbia and Montenegro), as partners in development, not as sources of destabilization. Few days later, on 21 March, the Parliament passed the Security Services Act (Zakon o sigurnosnim službama Republike Hrvatske). These laws formed the basis for reform of the Croatian intelligence community.

In accordance with Security Services Act three security and intelligence services were founded:

- Intelligence Agency (Obavještajna agencija or OA), formerly HIS, the primary duties of which were stated in Chapter III., Paragraph a), Article 7, Subsection (1) of the Act: "The Intelligence Agency (OA) will, through its actions abroad, gather, analyze, process and evaluate information of political, economical, security and military nature in relation to foreign countries, international government and non-government organizations, political, military and economic alliances, groups and individuals, especially all those with the intention, the possibility, or those believed to be plotting plans and covert actions to jeopardize (Croatian) national security."
- Counterintelligence Agency (Protuobavještajna agencija or POA), formerly SZUP,
- Military Security Agency (Vojna sigurnosna agencija or VSA), formerly SIS.

To facilitate the cooperation between the Croatian President and the Prime Minister in directing security and intelligence services operations, the National Security Council was founded. Furthermore, in order for the operative coordination of the security and intelligence services operations to be realized, the Council for Coordination of Security and Intelligence Agencies was founded. The Office of the National Security Council was founded for the purpose of performing expert and administrative operations for the National Security Council and the Council for Coordination of Security and Intelligence Agencies.

The Ministry of Foreign Affairs retained its own department charged with security work, but it would only provide for security and the flow of information to Croatia's diplomatic offices abroad.

These changes did not fully resolve the problems of the agencies. After the new services were established, President Stipe Mesić proposed appointments for the directors of the agencies, but Prime Minister Ivica Račan refused to countersign the appointments. Additional problems were caused by a lack of coordination, since documents and files had to be transferred to the new agencies. Several days before the Office for National Security ceased to exist (on March 31), its outgoing head Tomislav Karamarko ordered all such materials to be moved to the Croatian State Archives. This gesture was a protest against the reorganization of the security and intelligence services. It also turned out to be a major scandal since the sensitive and confidential documents were not guarded at the archives, where they languished for several days before being taken to the Intelligence Agency.

The Directors of the Intelligence Agency were:

- Damir Lončarić
- Veselko Grubišić

=== From 2006 ===
The Croatia's security intelligence system went again through reforms in mid-2006, when the Croatian Parliament passed the Security Intelligence System Act, which came into effect on 17 August 2006. The Act reorganised the existing intelligence system: the Intelligence Agency (OA) and Counterintelligence Agency (POA) were merged into the newly established Security and Intelligence Agency (SOA), while the pre-existing Military Security Agency (VSA) was renamed Military Security and Intelligence Agency (VSOA) with its jurisdiction expanded to include activities abroad.
