= Nigerian Army personnel corps =

Personnel corps, in the Nigerian Army (NA), are groupings of related military occupations. The Nigerian Army is functionally organized into combat arms and combat support arms. There are 17 Corps Training Schools that support these corps.

== List of personnel corps ==
The following is a list of NA personnel corps in order of precedence:

Name	Headquarters	Established	Structure and purpose
Infantry Corps	Jaji, Kaduna State	21 April 1958	
Armoured Corps		21 April 1958	NAAC provides close combat support to the infantry.
Artillery Corps		April 1956	It provides fire support to manoeuvre units of the NA and protection against hostile artillery fire. It also provides air defence cover for strategic installations of the country as well as sensitive areas of operations.
Engineers Corps			
Signals Corps			
Intelligence Corps	Jaji, Kaduna State	1960	It us tasked with collecting, analyzing, and disseminating tactical and operational intelligence to support military operations.
Corps of Supply and Transport			
Medical Corps	Victoria Island, Lagos		
Ordnance Corps			
Electrical and Mechanical Engineers			
Military Police			
Education Corps			
Finance Corps			
Directorate of Army Physical Training			
Band Corps	Ojuelegba, Lagos	1932	It is a Corps dedicated to the provision and promotion of military music.
Women's Corps	Abuja	March 2018	Its a all-female division designed to integrate women into combat and advanced military operations. The Corps features operational battalions, including the Women's Special Operations Battalion. In 2025, NAWC decorated its first female soldier, Army Warrant Officer Hajara Egbunu.
Roman Catholic Chaplaincy	Ojo, Lagos		The Roman Catholic Chaplaincy is one of the oldest spiritual institutions in the army. It was founded as part of the West African Frontier Force, with priests being seconded from Britain to Nigeria to administer the spiritual concerns of officers and soldiers. Today, there are 32 chaplain officers in the RC, which is headed by the Director of Chaplain Services.
Protestant Chaplain Services	Yaba, Lagos		
Directorate of Islamic Affairs	Ikeja, Lagos	1963	It is a dedicated branch responsible for providing spiritual guidance, moral support, and religious education to Muslim personnel and their families. It traces its roots back to the Imam Department formed in 1963.
Directorate of Army Public Relations			
Directorate of Legal Services			

== See also ==
- Personnel branch
