= Counterintelligence Service =

Counterintelligence Service may refer to:

- Counterintelligence Corps (United States Army) (1917-1961)
- KOS (Yugoslavia), the Kontraobavještajna služba, the counterintelligence service of the Yugoslav People's Army
- MI5, the United Kingdom's internal counterintelligence and security agency
- Internal Counter-Intelligence Service, fictional British military organization from the UNIT audio plays by Big Finish

== See also ==
- Counterintelligence
- List of counterintelligence organizations
