= Intelligence Protection Organization of the Islamic Revolutionary Guard Corps =

Iranian intelligence bureau

- سازمان حفاظت اطلاعات سپاه پاسداران انقلاب اسلامی; Rokn-e-Dovvom

Agency overview
- Formed: 1984; 42 years ago
- Jurisdiction: Government of the Islamic Republic of Iran
- Headquarters: Tehran,Iran
- Agency executive: Vacant, Director
- Parent department: Islamic Revolutionary Guard Corps

The Intelligence Protection Organization of the Islamic Revolutionary Guard Corps (Persian: سازمان حفاظت اطلاعات سپاه پاسداران انقلاب اسلامی, Sazman-e Hefazat-e Sepah) is an Iranian intelligence agency within the Islamic Revolutionary Guard Corps (IRGC) and part of the Council for Intelligence Coordination.

The agency split from the Intelligence Organization of the IRGC in 1984, and was mainly a military intelligence unit. In 1991, the agency was restructured as an independent organization reporting to the Supreme Leader of Iran, mainly tasked with IRGC personnel surveillance and combating espionage inside the Islamic Revolutionary Guard Corps.

The Intelligence Protection Organization has three subsidiary units: the Supreme Leader’s Protection Corps (Sazman-e Sepah-e Vali-e Amr); the Ansar-al-Mahdi Protection Unit; and the Aviation Protection Organization (or Airlines' Protection Unit) (Sepah-e Hefazat-e Havapeimaei).

== Directors ==
No.	Chairman	Rank	Took office	Left office
1	Ali Saeedi Shahroudi	None (Cleric)	20 November 1984	6 March 1994
2	Morteza Rezaee	Brigadier General	6 March 1994	6 May 2006
3	Gholam-Hossein Ramezani	None (Cleric)	6 May 2006	2008 (Note: before 2011)
4	Mohammad Kazemi	Brigadier General	2008 (Note: before 2014)	26 June 2022
5	Majid Khademi	Brigadier General	26 June 2022	6 April 2026

== See also ==
- Parallel Intelligence Agency
- Intelligence Protection Organization of the Islamic Republic of Iran Army, similar agency
