= Second Bureau =

Second Bureau may refer to:

== Military ==
- Deuxième Bureau, a French military intelligence agency between 1871 and 1940
- Second Bureau (Lebanon), Lebanon's military intelligence agency from 1946 until 1989
- Deuxième Bureau (Morocco), Morocco's military intelligence agency
- Second Bureau (Syria), Syria's military intelligence agency from 1945 until 1969
- Second Bureau (Iran), Iran's military intelligence agency from 1926 until 1979

== Art ==
- Second Bureau (novel), a work by the French writer Charles Robert-Dumas
- Second Bureau (1935 film), a French film directed by Pierre Billon
- Second Bureau (1936 film), a British film directed by Victor Hanbury
