= Mohammad Kazemi =

Iranian military officer (1961–2025)

- محمد کاظمی
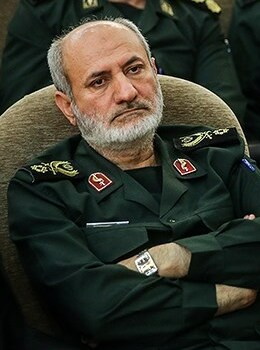
- Kazemi in 2019

Director of the IRGC Intelligence Organization
- In office 2022–2025
- President: Ebrahim Raisi; Mohammad Mokhber (acting); Masoud Pezeshkian
- Supreme Leader: Ali Khamenei; Mojtaba Khamenei
- Preceded by: Hossein Taeb
- Succeeded by: Majid Khademi

Director of the IRGC Intelligence Protection Organization
- In office 2008–2022
- President: Mahmoud Ahmadinejad; Hassan Rouhani; Ebrahim Raisi
- Supreme Leader: Ali Khamenei
- Preceded by: Gholam-Hossein Ramezani
- Succeeded by: Majid Khademi

Personal details
- Born: 11 July 1961 Semnan, Iran
- Died: 15 June 2025 (aged 63) Tehran, Iran
- Manner of death: Assassination by airstrike

Military service
- Allegiance: Iran
- Branch/service: IRGC
- Years of service: 1980s–2025
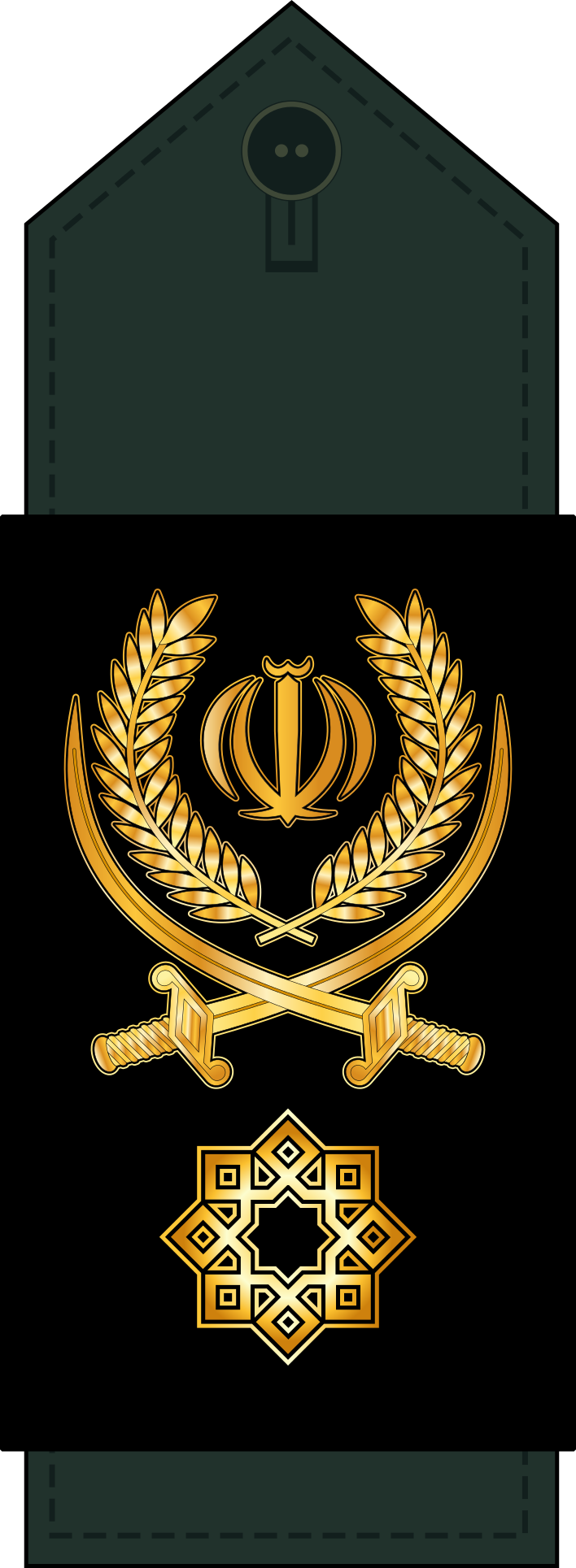
- Rank: Brigadier general
- Battles/wars: Iran–Iraq War; Syrian civil war; Iranian intervention in Syria; War in Iraq (2013–2017); Iranian intervention in Iraq; 2024 Iran–Israel conflict; Twelve-Day War †

Mohammad Kazemi (Persian: محمد کاظمی; 11 July 1961 – 15 June 2025) was an Iranian intelligence officer and brigadier general in the Islamic Revolutionary Guard Corps (IRGC). He served as the commander of the IRGC's Intelligence Organization from 2022 until his death in 2025, when he was killed by an Israeli airstrike during the Twelve-Day War.

== Early life ==
Kazemi was born on 11 July 1961 in Semnan, Iran, a city located east of the capital city, Tehran.

== Career ==
Kazemi first became a member of the Islamic Revolution Committees formed by Ruhollah Khomeini to suppress opposition to the regime beginning in the 1980s. He also served as an Iranian intelligence official. Kazemi served as the head of the Islamic Revolutionary Guard Corps's (IRGC) Intelligence Protection Organization, a counter-intelligence agency, from at least 2013.

He was appointed chief of intelligence in June 2022, replacing Hossein Taeb. His rank was brigadier general.

According to the Spreading Justice database, as head of intelligence Kazemi was "directly responsible for human rights violations against all Iranian citizens from various ethnicities, religions, orientations, professions, and political views".

== Sanctions ==
In October 2022, Kazemi was designated by the United States Department of the Treasury's Office of Foreign Assets Control (OFAC), under Executive Order 14078. In addition, he was sanctioned under Executive Order 13224 for his role in suppressing civil society in Iran and arresting dissidents, including dual nationals. Kazemi oversaw "the regime's brutal crackdown against protests" across Iran following the killing of Mahsa Amini.

Kazemi was sanctioned by the United Kingdom in October 2024, along with other Iranian government figures.

== Death ==
Kazemi and his deputy, Hassan Mohaghegh, were killed on 15 June 2025 during the Israeli strikes on Iran. His death was announced by Israeli prime minister Benjamin Netanyahu, and later confirmed by Iran's Tasnim News Agency. It had previously been reported in Iranian media that Kazemi and Mohaghegh were trapped under rubble after an airstrike on an IRGC Intelligence Organization building in Tehran.

Military offices
Preceded by Gholam-Hossein Ramezani	Commander of the Intelligence Protection Organization of the Islamic Revolutionary Guard Corps; 2008–2022	Succeeded by Majid Khademi
Preceded by Hossein Taeb	Commander of the Intelligence Organization of the Islamic Revolutionary Guard Corps; 2022–2025	
