= Majid Khademi =

Iranian general (died 2026)

Sardar Majid Khademi
- مجید خادمی
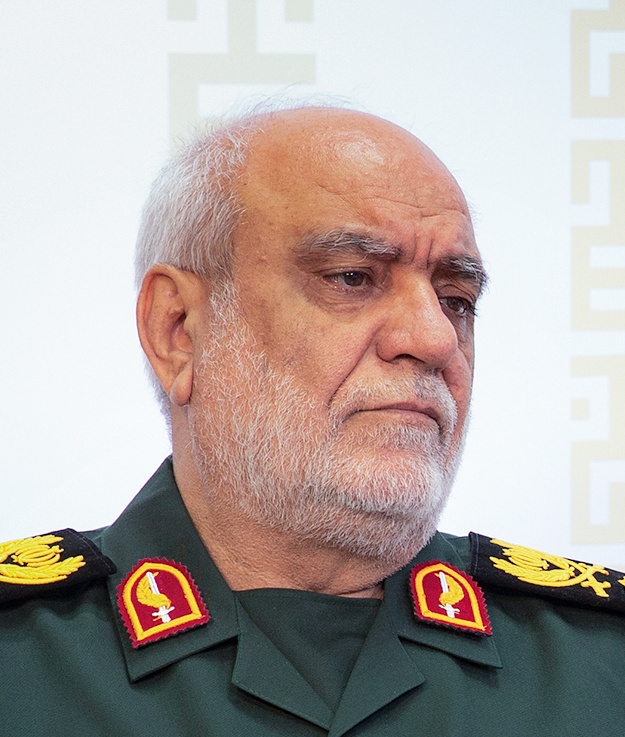
- Khademi in 2026

Director of the IRGC Intelligence Organization
- In office 2025 – 6 April 2026
- President: Masoud Pezeshkian
- Supreme Leader: Ali Khamenei; Mojtaba Khamenei
- Preceded by: Mohammad Kazemi
- Succeeded by: Vacant

Director of the IRGC Intelligence Protection Organization
- In office 2022 – 6 April 2026
- President: Ebrahim Raisi; Mohammad Mokhber (acting); Masoud Pezeshkian
- Supreme Leader: Ali Khamenei
- Preceded by: Mohammad Kazemi
- Succeeded by: Vacant

Director of the Information Protection Organization of the Ministry of Defense and Armed Forces Support
- In office 2018–2022
- President: Hassan Rouhani; Ebrahim Raisi
- Supreme Leader: Ali Khamenei
- Preceded by: Asghar Mirjafari
- Succeeded by: Rahim Yacoubi

Deputy Director of the IRGC Intelligence Organization
- In office 2009–2014
- President: Mahmoud Ahmadinejad; Hassan Rouhani
- Supreme Leader: Ali Khamenei
- Preceded by: Office Established
- Succeeded by: Unknown

Personal details
- Born: 6 September 1962 Amir Hajjilu, Fasa County, Fars province Pahlavi Iran
- Died: 6 April 2026 (aged 63) Tehran, Iran
- Cause of death: Assassination by Airstrike

Military service
- Allegiance: Iran
- Branch/service: IRGC
- Years of service: 1980s–2026
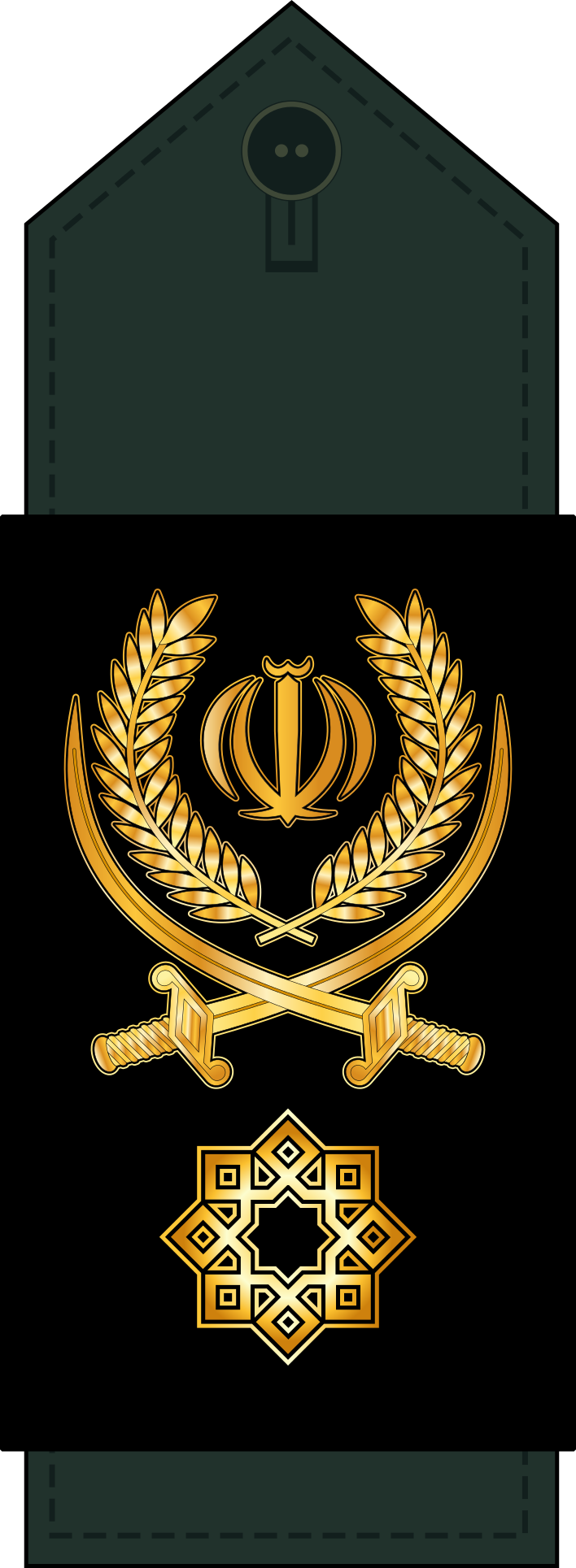
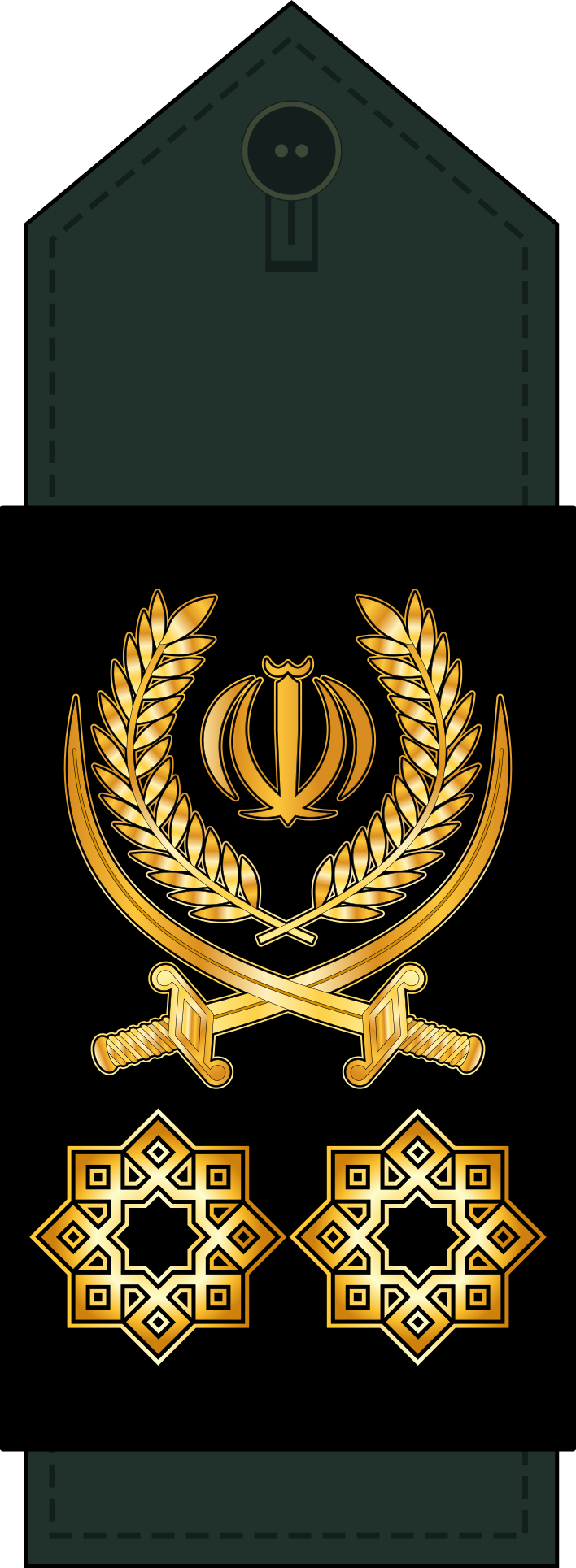
- Rank: Brigadier General; Major General (posthumously)
- Battles/wars: Iran–Iraq War; Syrian civil war; Iranian intervention in Syria; War in Iraq (2013–2017); Iranian intervention in Iraq; 2024 Iran–Israel conflict; Twelve-Day War; 2026 Iran war †

Majid Khademi (Persian: مجید خادمی; 6 September 1962 – 6 April 2026) was an Iranian Brigadier General in the Islamic Revolutionary Guard Corps (IRGC) who served as head of the IRGC Intelligence Protection Organization from 2022 and of the IRGC Intelligence Organization from 2025 until his assassination in an Israeli airstrike during the 2026 Iran war.

Khademi also appeared in media reports under the name Majid Hosseini; his exact legal name has not been publicly clarified.

== Early life and education ==
Majid Khademi held dual PhDs, in national security and in strategic defense sciences.

== Career ==
Following the establishment of the IRGC Intelligence Organization, Khademi was mentioned in some reports as a potential successor to Hossein Taeb, who headed the organization at the time, a role with which Khademi was associated until at least 2014.

In May 2018, he was appointed head of the Intelligence Protection Organization of the Ministry of Defence and Armed Forces Logistics, replacing Asghar Mirjafari, and served in this position until 2022.

In June 2022, he was appointed head of the IRGC Intelligence Protection Organization, with his induction ceremony held on 29 July 2022.

On 19 June 2025, Khademi was appointed head of the IRGC Intelligence Organization, succeeding Mohammad Kazemi, who was killed alongside other IRGC officers in Israeli airstrikes on 15 June during the Twelve-Day War.

== Death ==
Khademi was killed in Tehran in an Israeli airstrike on 6 April 2026, during the 2026 Iran war. Supreme Leader Mojtaba Khamenei condemned the assassination, praising Khademi as "self-effacingly struggling on the path of God for decades in the fields of the nation's security, intelligence, and defense."

== See also ==
- List of Iranian officials killed during the 2026 Iran war

Military offices
| Preceded by Office Established | Deputy Director of the IRGC Intelligence Organization; 2009–2014 | Succeeded by ? |
| Preceded by Asghar Mirjafari | Director of the Information Protection Organization of the Ministry of Defense and Armed Forces Support; 2018–2022 | Succeeded by Rahim Yacoubi |
| Preceded by Mohammad Kazemi | Director of the Intelligence Protection Organization of the Islamic Revolutionary Guard Corps; 2022–2026 | Vacant |
| Preceded by Mohammad Kazemi | Director of the Intelligence Organization of the Islamic Revolutionary Guard Corps; 2025–2026 | Vacant |
