= Office of the National Security Council =

- Ured Vijeća za nacionalnu sigurnost

Agency overview
- Formed: 17 August 2006; 19 years ago
- Headquarters: Zagreb, Croatia
- Agency executive: Valentino Franjić, Director
- Website: www.uvns.hr

The Office of the National Security Council (Croatian: Ured Vijeća za nacionalnu sigurnost, UVNS) is the body of the Croatian security and intelligence system which provides support in the field of national security for major state institutions. The UVNS was founded on 17 August 2006.

== Role ==
The UVNS was founded for the purpose of performing expert and administrative operations for the National Security Council and the Council for Coordination of Security and Intelligence Agencies.

UVNS controls the legality, effectiveness and usefulness of work of intelligence agencies. Expert oversight of the work of the security and intelligence agencies and OTC is one of the key functions of UVNS.

UVNS is the Croatian National Security Authority (NSA), which coordinates, harmonizes the adoption and controls the implementation of information security measures in the Republic of Croatia.

On October 21, 2012, Petar Mišević was removed as the head of the Office following a phone-tapping scandal.

On 30 October 2012, Ivica Panenić was appointed as director of the Office of the National Security Council.

== See also ==
- Croatian security and intelligence system
- National Security Council (Croatia)
