= Intelligence Coordination Council =

Iranian intelligence agencies

The Intelligence Coordinating Council, also known as Iranian Intelligence Community, is an organisation composed of 16 intelligence agencies of Iran. The council is made up of intelligence agency's chiefs. Presence of 16 agencies was announced for the first time by the Fars News Agency in 2014.

== Members ==
- Minister of Intelligence (Chair of the council)
- Minister of Interior
- Minister of Foreign Affairs
- Prosecutor General of Iran
- Director of IRGC Intelligence Organization
- Director of IRGC Intelligence Protection Organization
- Deputy for Intelligence of the Islamic Republic of Iran Army
- Director of Intelligence Protection Organization of the Islamic Republic of Iran Army
- Director of Police Intelligence Organization
- Director of Islamic Republic of Iran Police Intelligence Protection Organization
- Director of Intelligence Protection Organization of the Ministry of Defence and Armed Forces Logistics
- Director of Intelligence Protection Organization of General Staff of the Islamic Republic of Iran Armed Forces
- Director of Intelligence Protection Policy Office of the General Command
- Director of Judiciary Information Protection Center
- Director of Security Organization of the Office of Supreme Leader

== See also ==
- Parallel Intelligence Agency
- Ministry of Intelligence
