= Islamic Revolutionary Guard Corps Cyber Command =

Cyber warfare command of the Iranian Revolutionary Guard Corps

The Islamic Revolutionary Guards Corps Cyber Security Command is a command of the Iranian Islamic Revolutionary Guard Corps (IRGC) responsible for cyber warfare and cyber security. It was founded in 2006, and its command was established in 2015.

== 2026 French supermarket refrigerator hack ==
On 9 November, France's ANSSI attributed a first-of-its-kind, large-scale sabotage cyberattack on 12 October—which spoiled food by spiking temperatures at 700 supermarkets—to Iran's IRGC-affiliated Shahid Kaveh group, adding that it found links to another IRGC cyber unit, Shahid Shoostari, to multiple French cyberattacks since 2020, including those targeting the Charlie Hebdo newspaper in 2023 and the 2024 Summer Olympics.

== History ==
Previously it was called "Center of Organized Crime Inspection".

In 2022 identities of its members were hacked and leaked. It has conducted a number of cyber attacks against infrastructure.

They contract or "rent" hackers to breach accounts of dissidents.

In 2009–10 protests and 2022–23 protests it asked for tips to identify rioters.

== Introduction ==
Its official introduction claims it is allowed on basis of the Iranian Constitution Article 150.

In its organization news bulletin website its stated mission include counter

- Cultural social media impact
- lifestyle change
- Western espionage
- Security threat and cyber attack and sabotage
- Internet illegal access through internet censorship circumvention tools
- Help digital diplomacy

It also targets modelling pages and agencies.

It was headed by Brigadier Commander General Mostafa Izadi in 2017.

== Timeline history ==
It has run several operations against websites /admins

- Mozzellin (Enemies)
- Mersad (Ambush)
- Darkoob (Woodpecker)
- Spider

In 1397 propaganda accounts, social media handles and pages and channels related to the organization were reported on the internet.

== Sanction ==
The British government imposed sanctions on the organization in 2023 due to concerns about human rights regression and perceived threats. The United States has sanctioned it for human rights repression and election interference as well.

== See also ==
- Intelligence Organization of the Islamic Revolutionary Guard Corps
- Rank Insignia of the Islamic Revolutionary Guard Corps
- List of aircraft of the Islamic Revolutionary Guard Corps Aerospace Force
- Ansar al-Mahdi Protection Corps
- IRGC University of Command and Staff
