= Servicio Federal de Lucha contra el Narcotráfico =

Argentine intelligence agency

The Servicio Federal de Lucha contra el Narcotráfico (lit. 'Federal Service Against Drug Trafficking', SFLN, SEFECONAR) is an Argentine intelligence agency with special police tasks closely modelled on the American DEA.

It was created through the Executive Decree N° 717 of April 18, 1991. A matter of controversy, its existence was not acknowledged by the Menem administration.

== See also ==
- Argentine Federal Police
- Argentine Federal Police Intelligence
- Interior Security System
- National Intelligence System
- National Directorate of Criminal Intelligence
- 2025 livestreamed murder in Argentina
