= National Police Intelligence Directorate =

The National Direction of Police Intelligence (Dirección Nacional de Inteligencia Policial - DNIP) manages the National Police of Panama, to produce strategic and operational intelligence; knowledge of threats, challenges, worries, criminality and the social demands, to orient the taking of decisions in front of the factors of perturbation of the public order, the security and the defence, by part of the controls and the government.

This direction is independent of the Direction of Judicial Investigation (D.I.J. ).

== Direction Police Information ==
Before the creation of the DNIP the police were managed by the Direction Police Information (DIP) This direction to the same work that the National Direction of Police Intelligence (DNIP).

== Organization ==
- Department of Security of Airports
  - Section Antinarcóticos
    - Unit of Rooms Body Scan
    - Unit of Rooms of Reconciliation
  - Security of the Traveller
- Department of Analysis
- Department of Operations
- Department of Intelligence
- Department of Counterintelligence
