= National Counter Terrorism Centre (Nigeria) =

Nigerian government organization

National Counter Terrorism Centre (NCTC)
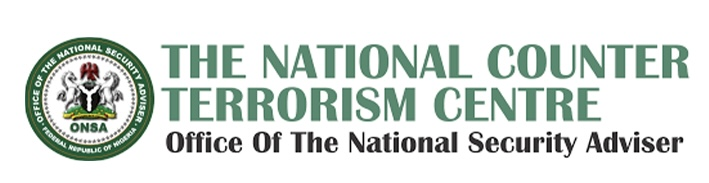

Agency overview
- Formed: 2012 (as a directorate), fully established as a Centre in May, 2022
- Preceding agency: Counter Terrorism Directorate (ONSA)
- Jurisdiction: Federal Republic of Nigeria
- Headquarters: Abuja, Nigeria
- Employees: classified
- Annual budget: classified
- Agency executives: Mallam Nuhu Ribadu, National Security Adviser; Major General Adamu Garba Laka, National Coordinator
- Parent agency: Office of the National Security Adviser (ONSA)
- Website: nctc.gov.ng

The National Counter Terrorism Centre (NCTC) is a specialized multi-agency governmental body in Nigeria responsible for coordinating national counterterrorism measures, preventing violent extremism, and tracking terrorism financing. Operating under the Office of the National Security Adviser (ONSA), the center serves as the central hub for the harmonization of Nigeria's strategic, intelligence, and operational counterterrorism frameworks.

== History ==
Nigeria's institutional fight against structural terrorism began in earnest around 2009 following the rise of the Boko Haram insurgency in the country's northeast region. In response to these evolving security challenges, the National Assembly passed the Terrorism Prevention Act 2011 (later amended in 2013), which officially designated the Office of the National Security Adviser (ONSA) as the coordinating body for all counterterrorism efforts in Nigeria. Flowing from this legislative mandate, the Counter Terrorism Centre (CTC) was originally set up in 2012, operating initially as a directorate within ONSA. The transition into a fully-fledged independent Centre occurred with the enactment of the Terrorism (Prevention and Prohibition) Act 2022. Signed into law by President Muhammadu Buhari, this legislation formally established the National Counter Terrorism Centre (NCTC) as a distinct entity equipped with enhanced powers to lead inter-agency operational planning, intelligence fusion, and international collaboration.

== Mandate and function ==
The NCTC operates via a "Whole-of-Government" and "Whole-of-Society" approach, utilizing staff and experts seconded from various ministries, departments, and agencies (MDAs), including the Nigerian Armed Forces, law enforcement, and intelligence communities. Its primary mandates include:

- Intelligence Analysis and Monitoring: Maintaining specialized cells—such as an Open-Source Intelligence (OSINT) unit—and dedicated monitoring rooms to process threat vectors.
- Preventing and Countering Violent Extremism (PCVE): Coordinating the implementation of Nigeria's Policy Framework and National Action Plan for PCVE, originally adopted in 2017 to address root causes of radicalization through community, religious, and civil engagements.
- Counter-Terrorism Financing: Working via the Counter Financing of Terrorism Joint Standing Committee to intercept and disrupt funding networks used by insurgent groups.
- Technical and Forensics Hub: Housing cutting-edge cyber security, digital analysis, and DNA forensics labs to gather evidence for the prosecution of terrorism-related offenses.
- International Collaboration: Serving as Nigeria's key point of contact with international partners such as the United Nations Office of Counter-Terrorism (UNOCT) and the African Union Peace and Security Council (AU PSC).

== Leadership ==
The center is headed by a National Coordinator, appointed by the President on the recommendation of the National Security Adviser.

=== List of Coordinators ===
- Rear Admiral Yaminu Ehinomen Musa (Rtd.) (August 2022 – March 2024)
- Major-General Adamu Garba Laka (March 2024 – Present)
