= Agenzia Informazioni e Sicurezza Interna =

Domestic intelligence service of Italy

Internal Intelligence and Security Agency
- Agenzia informazioni e sicurezza interna AISI
- Coat of arms of the AISI

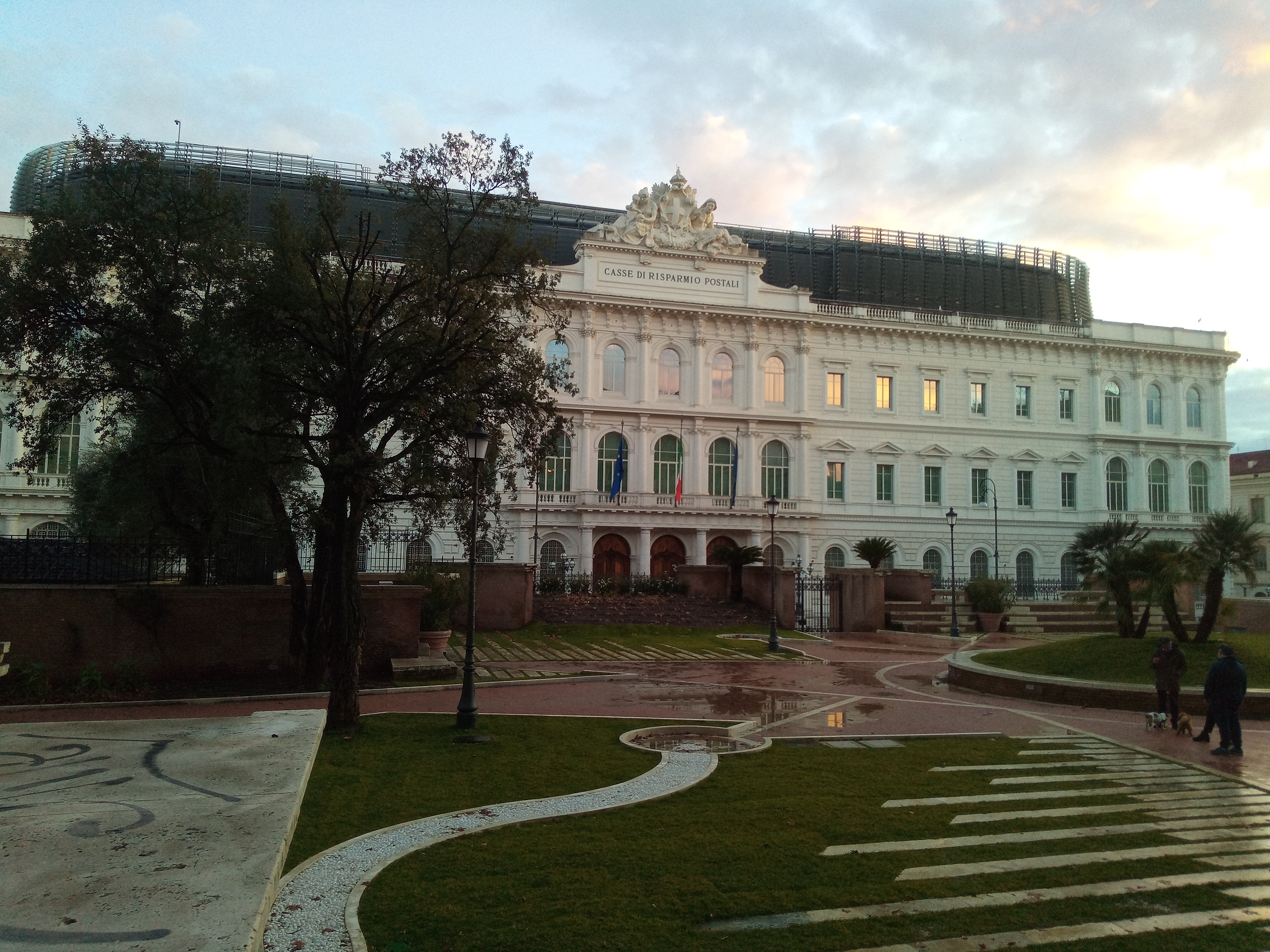
- Italy's intelligence headquarters in Rome

Agency overview
- Formed: 28 August 2007; 18 years ago
- Preceding agency: SISDE
- Jurisdiction: Government of Italy
- Headquarters: Rome, Palazzo delle casse di risparmio postali, Piazza Dante 25
- Minister responsible: Giorgia Meloni, Prime Minister of Italy
- Agency executive: Bruno Valensise, Director
- Website: http://www.sicurezzanazionale.gov.it

Footnotes
- Presidency of the Council of Ministers; Dipartimento delle Informazioni per la Sicurezza

The Agenzia Informazioni e Sicurezza Interna (Italian for "Internal Intelligence and Security Agency"), commonly known as AISI, is the domestic security agency of Italy.

== See also ==
- Italian intelligence agencies
- Agenzia Informazioni e Sicurezza Esterna
