= Deuxième Bureau (Morocco) =

Moroccan military intelligence agency

Second Bureau
- المكتب الثاني

Agency overview
- Formed: 1956; 70 years ago
- Jurisdiction: Morocco
- Headquarters: Rabat

The Deuxième Bureau is the military secret service of Morocco. It is in charge of the military surveillance of foreign armies and of foreign land borders. It derives its name from the Deuxième Bureau of the French colonial empire, of which Morocco was a part.

== See also ==
- List of intelligence agencies
