= Central State Security Agency =

Intelligence agency in Yemen

- الجهاز المركزي لأمن الدولة

Agency overview
- Formed: 4 January 2024
- Preceding agencies: Political Security Organization; National Security Bureau
- Jurisdiction: Presidential Leadership Council
- Headquarters: Aden, Yemen
- Agency executives: Muhammad Ayda, Director; Faisal Bajari, Deputy Director

The Central State Security Agency (Note: Arabic: الجهاز المركزي لأمن الدولة) is the primary intelligence agency of the Presidential Leadership Council, which represents the internationally recognized government of Yemen. The agency was formed in 2024 as a merging of the two previous intelligence agencies of the Yemeni government and the services of the other parties in the PLC. The merging process was completed and its leadership was approved of in 2025.

== History ==
Prior to the Yemeni civil war, two main government agencies were responsible for intelligence; the Political Security Organization (PSO), which traced its roots back to the 1970s in North Yemen before being officially established in 1992, and the National Security Bureau (NSB), established in 2002. During the war, the agencies effectively operated as rivals and independent of the government.

The Central State Security Agency was created by Presidential Decree No. 5 of 2024, issued by President Rashad al-Alimi on 4 January. The decree stipulated the mergal of the PSO and the NSB, along with the other intelligence services of various parties in the Presidential Leadership Council, including the Southern Transitional Council, the Yemeni National Resistance and the Southern Giants Brigades, into one agency. The agency was created to address the lack of intelligence coordination between the members of the PLC since its formation in April 2022. A committee formed by the PLC along with the directors of the PSO and NSB were tasked with planning the integration of the different agencies within six months.

The formation process of the Central State Security Agency was delayed by internal disagreements within the PLC and hesitancy from the leadership of some of agencies slated to be integrated. In late October 2025, the PLC reviewed a report by the integration committee finalizing the process, though the services from the STC and National Resistance had not yet been integrated. Presidential Decree No. 284 of 2025, issued on 26 November, appointed Muhammad Saleh Ayda as the director of the Central State Security Agency and Faisal Badr Muhammad Bajari as deputy director.

Local journalist Fares Al-Himyari, correspondent of Xinhua News Agency, reported that STC forces raided the headquarters of the Central State Security Agency on 29 November.

== Organization ==
The Central State Security Agency is responsible for intelligence gathering and analysis, and takes a role in counterterrorism, border security, and the protection of national sovereignty. The founding document of the Central State Security Agency stipulates that it reports directly to the Chairman of the PLC and conducts "all duties and responsibilities outlined in the republican decision." The headquarters of the agency is in Aden, the temporary capital of Yemen, and there is a possibility for more branches to be established in the different governorates of Yemen. The organizational regulations of the agency are issued by the PLC chairman in consultation with the integration committee, while the agency director issues organizational regulations regarding the administrative units and security force units, individual members, and security of its premises.
