= Brigada de Investigación Tecnológica =

Technological Investigation Brigade Brigada de Investigación Tecnológica
- Abbreviation: BIT

Agency overview
- Formed: 2002

Jurisdictional structure
- National agency: Spain
- Operations jurisdiction: Spain
- Population: 40,525,002 (July 2009 est.)
- General nature: Civilian police

Operational structure
- Headquarters: Madrid, Spain
- Agency executive: Vázquez López, Comisario - Superintendent

Website
- http://www.policia.es/bit/index.htm https://www.facebook.com/BrigadaInvestigacionTecnologica http://tuenti.com/bit

The Technological Investigation Brigade (BIT) is a unit of the Cuerpo Nacional de Policía, the national civilian police force of Spain. BIT has the task of combating new and emerging forms of crime such as child pornography, Internet fraud, communications fraud, cyber attacks, and copyright infringement.

== Mission ==
- Carry out complex investigations
- Coordinate investigations involving other jurisdictions
- Training personnel from the National Police Corp and foreign police agencies
- Coordination of investigations with origins in other countries

== History ==
The idea for the BIT began in 1995 with the creation of the Group of Information Crimes within the Brigade of Economic and Financial Crimes. The group eventually split into separate sections of expertise that resemble its current organization. In 2002, the group gained its current name of the Technological Investigation Brigade (BIT). The BIT exists within the Unit of Economic and Fiscal Crime.

== Structure ==
The BIT has three sections with diverse missions. The first section, comprising two groups, protects minors particularly from child pornography. These groups rescue endangered children and prosecute their abusers. The second section also contains two groups. One of these groups investigates internet offenses such as fraudulent credit cards usage, and more complex techniques such as phishing and network attacks. The second group in the internet security section focuses exclusively on crimes involving industrial espionage and intellectual property. The third section, dubbed the Technical Section deals with forensic analysis.

== Crimes BIT Prosecutes ==
- They investigate threats, libel, or slander contained in e-mails, forums, newsgroups, and the internet.
- They combat child pornography and protect children from adverse uses of new technology.
- The BIT prevents fraud in communications such as bootlegging private movie channels.
- They investigate internet fraud, scams, unauthorized credit card use, and regulate online business.
- BIT investigates cyber security threats such as viruses, denial of service attacks, data theft, hacking, blackmail, and identity theft.
- The unit also investigates copyright violation of computer programs, music, and film.

== Contact ==
- https://web.archive.org/web/20100221053553/http://www.policia.es/bit/index.htm
- https://www.policia.es/org_central/judicial/udef/bit_quienes_somos.html
- https://www.facebook.com/BrigadaInvestigacionTecnologica
