= Intelligence Organization of the Islamic Revolutionary Guard Corps =

- سازمان اطلاعات سپاه پاسداران انقلاب اسلامی; Rokn-e-Dovvom

Agency overview
- Formed: 1979; 47 years ago
- Jurisdiction: Government of the Islamic Republic of Iran
- Headquarters: Tehran,Iran
- Agency executive: Vacant, Director
- Parent department: Islamic Revolutionary Guard Corps

Intelligence Organization of the Islamic Revolutionary Guard Corps (Persian: سازمان اطلاعات سپاه پاسداران انقلاب اسلامی) is an Iranian intelligence agency within the Islamic Revolutionary Guard Corps (IRGC) and part of Intelligence Coordination Council. It was established on Ali Khamenei's initiative in 2009.

According to Stratfor, it is as powerful as the Ministry of Intelligence and possibly even more powerful than the other service. The agency appears to be more active at a domestic level while at an international level, the Quds Force is the key operational group. The agency also has a wide range of Basij informers. It has been described as a "more ideological counterpart" to the Ministry of Intelligence, which it "overshadows" and "often" overrules, according to the New York Times.

== Description ==
The IO-IRGC is known for conducting internal surveillance, suppressing dissent, and maintaining a vast network of ideological informants. Foundation for Defense of Democracies, a pro-Israel lobby group, alleges that the Commander of IRGC Intelligence is directly implicated in "surveilling and torturing dissidents". According to Iran International, the IO‑IRGC systematically employs white torture and rape threats.

During his tenure as head of the intelligence organization, Kazemi was sanctioned by the U.S. Treasury in October 2022 and February 2025 primarily over his role in suppressing dissidents in Iran.

== Directors ==
Head of the Department of Investigation and Intelligence

- Ali Mohammad Besharati (May 1979–June 1979)

Head of the Intelligence Department

- Mohsen Rezaee (June 1979–September 1981)
- Vahid Naseri (1981–?)
- Reza Seifollahi (1981–1983)

Head of the Intelligence Department of the IRGC General Staff

- Seyyed Kazem Kazemi (1984–1985)
- Ahmad Vahidi (1985–1988)

Head of the Intelligence Department of the Joint Staff of the IRGC

- Gholamreza Mehrabi (?)
- Ahmad Vahidi (1998–?)
- Gholamhossein Ramezani (20 August 2005–6 May 2006)
- Esmail Qaani (6 May 2006–2007)

Deputy for Intelligence to the IRGC Commander-in-Chief

- Seyyed Majid Ahmadi (2007–2008)
- Gholamhossein Ramezani (2008–5 October 2009)

Deputy to the IRGC Commander-in-Chief and Head of the Intelligence Organization

- Hossein Taeb (5 October 2009–23 June 2022)
- Mohammad Kazemi X (23 June 2022–15 June 2025)
- Majid Khademi X (19 June 2025–6 April 2026)

=== Deputy Directors ===
- Hossein Nejat (2016–2019)
- Hassan Mohaqeq X (2019–2025)

Co-Deputy

- Mehdi Sayyari (from 2016)

== See also ==
- Parallel Intelligence Agency
- Islamic Revolutionary Guard Corps Cyber Command
- Ministry of Intelligence, similar agency
