= Nigerian Army Intelligence Corps =

Nigerian Army's branch for military intelligence

- Active: 1960-Present
- Country: Nigeria
- Branch: Nigerian Army
- Type: Combat Support
- Role: Military Intelligence, Counter-intelligence, Electronic Warfare Support Intelligence
- Garrison/HQ: Jaji, Nigeria
- Motto: Action through knowledge

The Nigerian Army Intelligence Corps (NAIC) is the functional military intelligence branch of the Nigerian Army. As one of the primary combat support arms of the land forces, the NAIC is tasked with collecting, analyzing, and disseminating tactical and operational intelligence to support military operations, safeguard national security, and maintain the operational security (OPSEC) of army formations.

== History ==
The origins of the corps trace back to the independence of Nigeria in 1960, evolving from intelligence units inherited from the colonial Royal West African Frontier Force (RWAFF). Following the structural reorganization of Nigeria's national intelligence architecture under Decree Number 19 of 1986, which dissolved the National Security Organization (NSO), military intelligence duties were vertically separated.

While the strategic and joint-service intelligence mandates were reassigned to the newly formed Defence Intelligence Agency (DIA), the NAIC retained its specialized mandate over organic, tactical, and battlefield ground intelligence required directly by the Nigerian Army.

In recent decades, the operational priority of the NAIC has pivoted significantly from conventional military observation toward counter-insurgency (COIN) and asymmetric warfare tracking, directly addressing the threats posed by Boko Haram, ISWAP, and armed banditry bands operating in the Sahelian and savanna belts of Northern Nigeria.

== Structure and Commands ==
The NAIC is directed by the Chief of Military Intelligence (CMI), a high-ranking officer reporting directly to the Chief of Army Staff (COAS). The internal architecture of the corps spans multiple distinct layer commands:

- NAIC Headquarters: Situated within the federal capital framework, managing nation-wide deployment, strategic assessments, and inter-agency intelligence-sharing protocols.
- Divisional Intelligence Brigades / Detachments: Every operational division of the Nigerian Army maintains an organic intelligence unit (e.g., the 81 Military Intelligence Brigade in Lagos, or specialized cells deployed within the 7 Infantry Division in Maiduguri) to support operational commands directly in the field.
- Counter Intelligence Command: A dedicated internal division assigned to protect military personnel, weapon networks, and facilities from subversion, sabotage, and corporate espionage.

=== Nigerian Army Intelligence School (NAIS) ===
The training arm of the corps is the Nigerian Army Intelligence School (NAIS). NAIS is responsible for developing institutional tradecraft among officers and enlisted personnel. The school administers training across various specific intelligence regimes, including:

- Tactical Intelligence Officers Course
- Detachment Commanders Course
- Operative Intelligence and Interrogation courses
- Cyber/Electronic Warfare Information Tracking

The institution regularly coordinates joint training exercises with domestic agencies, including the Force Investigation Department (FID) of the Nigeria Police Force, to improve forensic analysis and cross-agency intelligence integration.

== Roles and Responsibilities ==
The foundational operational goals of the NAIC include:

- Tactical Human Intelligence (HUMINT): Gathering underground field data regarding adversarial capabilities, equipment movements, and local networks.
- Counter-Intelligence: Mitigating internal leaks, scanning for infiltration risks, and conducting background vetting for soldiers assigned to sensitive tasks.
- Technical Support and Signals Intelligence: Working in tandem with the Nigerian Army Cyber Warfare Command to track insurgent digital structures, media channels, and electronic communication channels.
