= Intelligence Protection Organization of the Islamic Republic of Iran Army =

Iranian Military intelligence agency

- سازمان حفاظت اطلاعات ارتش جمهوری اسلامی ایران

Agency overview
- Formed: 1983; 43 years ago
- Preceding agency: Second Bureau of Imperial Iranian Army
- Jurisdiction: Government of Iran
- Headquarters: Tehran
- Agency executive: Mohammad Hassan Habibian, Director
- Parent agency: Islamic Republic of Iran Army

Intelligence Protection Organization of the Islamic Republic of Iran Army (Persian: سازمان حفاظت اطلاعات ارتش جمهوری اسلامی ایران), acronymed SAHEFAJA (Persian: ساحفاجا), is a military intelligence agency with a mission to perform counterespionage measures inside the army in order to prevent, discover and neutralize possible subversions, sabotages and coup d'etats. It has an independent command hierarchy from the army.

== Directors ==
- Mustafa Torabipour (1987–1998)
- Mehdi Montazeri (1998–2001)
- Akbar Diyantfar (2001–2005)
- fareang memar nehavandi (2005–?)
- Mohammad Hassan Habibian (?–2018)

== See also ==
- List of counterintelligence organizations
- Intelligence Protection Organization of the Islamic Revolutionary Guard Corps – similar agency
