= Security and Intelligence Agency (Croatia) =

Croatia's civilian foreign intelligence service

Security and Intelligence Agency Sigurnosno-obavještajna agencija
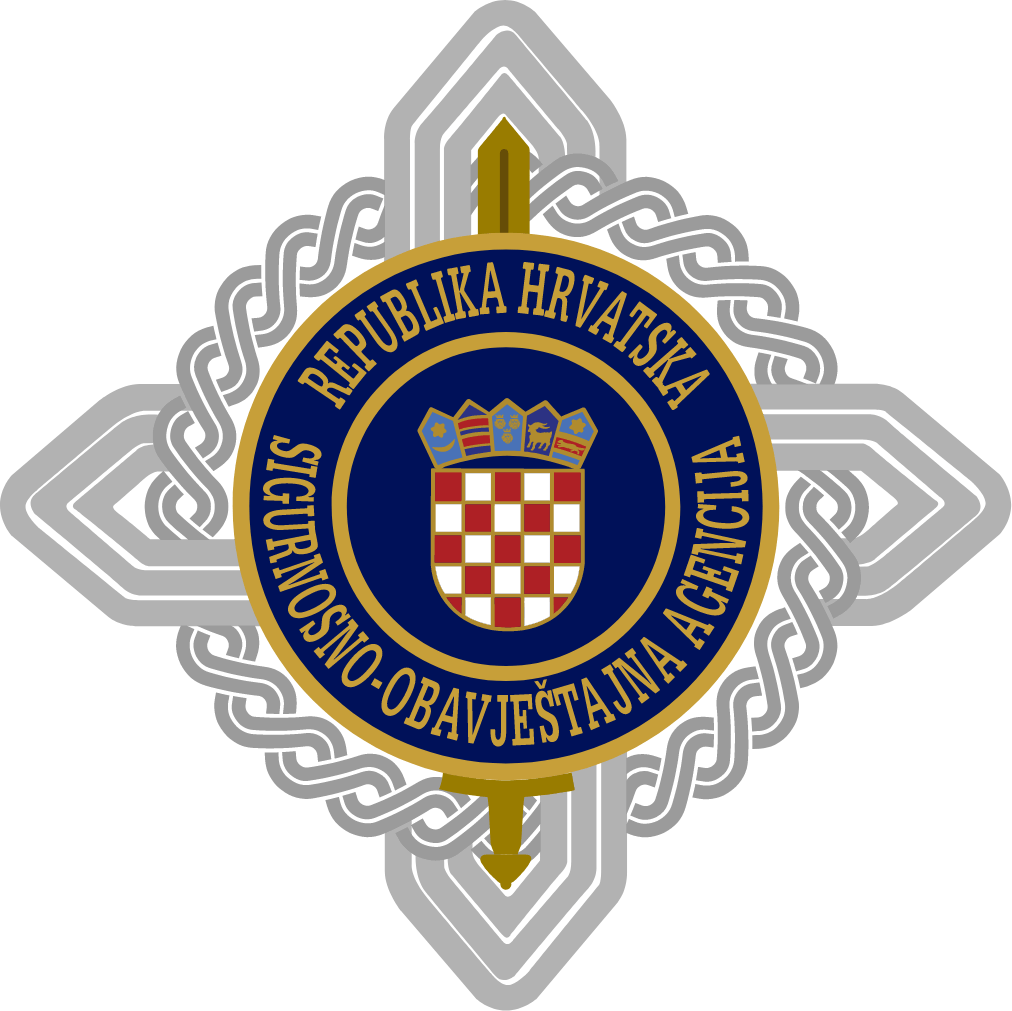
- Seal of the Security and Intelligence Agency

- Flag of the Security and Intelligence Agency

Agency overview
- Formed: 17 August 2006; 20 years ago
- Preceding agencies: The Intelligence Agency (OA) [hr] The Counterintelligence Agency (POA) [hr]
- Type: Foreign security-intelligence government agency
- Jurisdiction: Croatia
- Headquarters: Savska cesta 39/1, Zagreb, Croatia
- Employees: Classified (approx. 1,000–1,500)
- Budget: €75 million (2024 plan)
- Website: soa.hr

Director
- Currently: Hrvoje Omrčanin Deputy Director since 5 July 2024

The Security and Intelligence Agency (Croatian: Sigurnosno-obavještajna agencija, SOA) is a foreign security-intelligence agency of the Croatian government tasked with advancing national security through collecting and analyzing intelligence from around the world and conducting covert operations. It was founded in 2006 upon the formation of the Croatian security and intelligence system, a domestic intelligence community.

The Director of SOA is appointed or dismissed by a joint decision made by both the President and the Prime Minister. The SOA is focused on providing intelligence for a variety government entities while the Military Security and Intelligence Agency (VSOA) does the same for the Croatian Armed Forces.

== History ==
=== 1991 – 2002 ===
During the 1990s the central body for conducting national security was the Office for the Protection of Constitutional Order (Ured za zaštitu ustavnog poretka-UZUP) which was established by the President Franjo Tuđman on 27 May 1991. UZUP was decommissioned on 21 March 1993 when the National Security Office (Ured za nacionalnu sigurnost-UNS) was established by the second President's decision. UNS was put into the legal framework on 17 May 1995 by the enactment of the Law on the National Security Office (Zakon o uredu za nacionalnu sigurnost). Goals and tasks of the intelligence community in Croatia were also determined by the Joint National Security Committee (Stožerni odbor nacionalne sigurnosti-SONS) and the Intelligence Community Coordination Committee (Koordinacijski odbor obavještajne zajednice-KOOZ). The task of SONS was directed and coordinated by the work of government ministries in matters of national security, while KOOZ was responsible for the implementation of tasks received from SONS. The core of the intelligence community consisted of four departments that were involved in intelligence work:

- Croatian Intelligence Service (Hrvatska izvještajna služba-HIS)
- Service for the Protection of the Constitutional Order of the Ministry of Interior (Služba za zaštitu ustavnog poretka Ministarstva unutarnjih poslova RH-SZUP)
- Security Intelligence Service of the Ministry of Defense (Sigurnosno-informativna služba Ministarstva obrane RH-SIS)
- Intelligence Directorate of the General Staff of the Armed Forces (Obavještajna uprava Glavnog stožera Oružanih snaga RH-ObU GSOSRH)

The Croatian President was giving guidelines for the work of UNS and the Croatian intelligence community. The director of UNS and state ministers were determining tasks of the services for which they were responsible. KOOZ was preparing the annual plan of the intelligence community which consisted of projects and operative actions in which performance had to be attend by two or more services. SONS was approving the annual work plan of the intelligence community and supervised its execution. Apart from the above-mentioned UNS and other agencies, a wider range of security system consisted of the criminal police, military police, customs service, the financial police, whose representatives could call the session of KOOZ.

=== 2002 – 2006 ===
In 2002 the Croatian Parliament passed a Law on Security Services of the Republic of Croatia (Zakon o sigurnosnim službama Republike Hrvatske) and the National Security Strategy of the Republic of Croatia (Strategija nacionalne sigurnosti Republike Hrvatske). The law established three security services:

- Intelligence Agency (Obavještajana agencija-OA)
- Counterintelligence Agency (Protuobavještajna agencija-POA)
- Military Security Agency (Vojna sigurnosna agencija-VSA)

In order to achieve cooperation between the President and the Croatian Government in guiding the work of the security services as well as to harmonize the operational work of the security services, the Council for National Security (Vijeće za nacionalnu sigurnost) established the Council for Coordination of Security Agencies (Savjet za koordinaciju sigurnosnih službi). Special Office of the Council for National Security (Ured Vijeća za nacionalnu sigurnost) was established to perform professional and administrative work for the National Security Council and the Council for Coordination of Security Agencies.

=== 2006 – present ===
The 'Security and intelligence system' was reformed in mid-2006 by adopting the Law on Security and Intelligence System (Zakon o sigurnosno-obavještajnom sustavu). The law established two security services that are still active today:

- Security and Intelligence Agency (Sigurnosno-obavještajna agencija-SOA)
- Military Security and Intelligence Agency (Vojna sigurnosno-obavještajna agencija-VSOA).

== Working areas ==
SOA is focused on preventing activities or actions that endanger the constitutional order, and the security of state bodies, citizens and national interests by:

- terrorism and other forms of organized violence,
- intelligence activities of foreign intelligence agencies, organizations and individuals,
- extremist organization and activities of groups and individuals,
- endangering the safety of the highest state officials and protected facilities and space,
- organised and financial crime,
- unauthorized access to protected information and communication systems of government bodies,
- disclosure of classified information by heads and employees of state bodies, scientific institutions and legal persons with public authority,
- other activities aimed at threatening national security.

SOA gathers, analyzes, processes and evaluates data of a political, economic, scientific-technological, and security nature pertaining to the state, organizations, political and economic alliances, groups and people, particularly those who indicate intentions, capabilities, plans and hidden secret activities threatening national security, or data that is of importance to national security of the Republic of Croatia.

== See also ==
- Croatian security and intelligence system
