= Parallel Intelligence Agency =

Iranian intelligence organization

The Parallel Intelligence Agency (سازمان اطلاعات موازی lit. Parallel Intelligence Organization) is an intelligence agency within the Islamic Republic of Iran made up of personnel from multiple security organizations aggregated into ad hoc security bodies, with strong ties to Islamic Revolutionary Guard Corps (IRGC) and the judiciary.

These ad hoc entities are described as plainclothes police who operated at the behest of political conservatives opposed to the reformist ideas of President Mohammad Khatami.

== See also ==
- Council for Intelligence Coordination
