= Intelligence-Security Agency of Bosnia and Herzegovina =

Bosnian-Herzegovinian governmental intelligence agency

Intelligence-Security Agency of BiH
- Obavještajno sigurnosna / bezbjednosna agencija BiH
- Intelligence-Security Agency of BiH

Agency overview
- Formed: June 1, 2004
- Preceding agency: Investigation and Documentation Agency of the Republic of Bosnia and Herzegovina (AID)
- Jurisdiction: Bosnia and Herzegovina
- Headquarters: Sarajevo, Bosnia and Herzegovina
- Annual budget: Classified
- Agency executive: Almir Džuvo, Director
- Website: osa-oba.gov.ba

The Intelligence-Security Agency of BiH, commonly known by its acronym OSA-OBA BiH, is the national primary civilian intelligence and security agency of the Bosnia and Herzegovina tasked with advancing national security through collecting and analyzing intelligence from around the world and conducting clandestine and covert operations, countering hybrid threats, counterintelligence, counter-revolutionary, counterterrorism, creation a civilian security network intelligence, intelligence gathering and assessment, internal security, public security, surveillance of political activists who disagree with the government and are seen as a security threat, and threat assessment to national security.

It was established by the Bosnian Parliament in March 2004.

The primary responsibilities are within the country and include analysis and development of intelligence collection and counterintelligence systems to create national security, border security, civilian intelligence cybersecurity, clandestine and covert operations, countering hybrid threats, counterintelligence, counter-revolutionary, counterterrorism, creation a civilian security network intelligence, intelligence gathering and assessment, internal security, investigation and interrogation some other types of serious crimes, maintain confidentiality of civilian intelligence information and documents, national's central intelligence affair for coordinating intelligence activities, psychological and information warfare, political warfare, surveillance political activists who disagree with the government and are seen as a security threat, support irregular warfare, and threat assessment to national security.

== Mission and function ==
The State Intelligence Service has the following duties:

- Collect information from abroad for the purpose of national security;
- Collect information regarding organized crime that endangers national security;
- Collect information regarding terrorist activity, the production and trafficking of narcotics, the production of weapons of mass destruction and crimes against the environment;
- Undertake intelligence activities for the purpose of the protection of integrity, independence and constitutional order.

== Relationship with other state entities ==
Institutional Position of the State Intelligence Service and relationship with other state bodies:

The State Intelligence Service falls under the authority of the Prime Minister of Bosnia and Herzegovina. Its Head is appointed and dismissed by the President of the Republic on the advice of the Prime Minister of Bosnia and Herzegovina.

OSA operates within this context and while it has been identified as being "generally under effective civilian control" (U.S. Department of State, 2004) the agency has still been associated with various abuses within the country and continues to play a significant role in domestic politics. The Bosnian government has received support from the U.S. and European countries in working to establish or reform national institutions, including its intelligence and security services.
