= Military Security and Intelligence Agency (Croatia) =

Croatian intelligence agency

Military Security and Intelligence Agency Vojna sigurnosno-obavještajna agencija
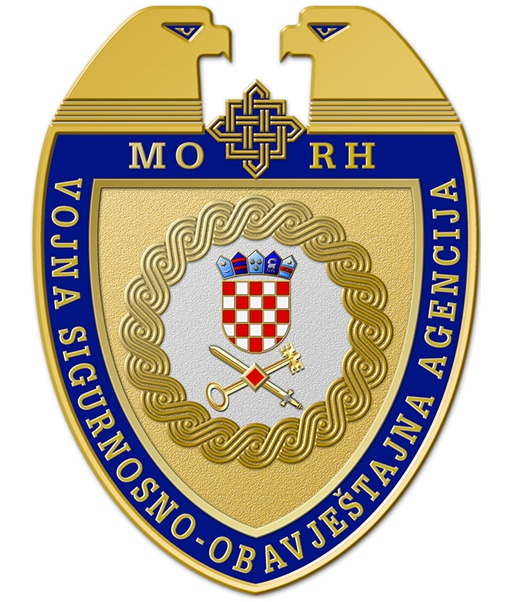
- Official seal

Agency overview
- Formed: 17 August 2006; 19 years ago
- Type: Specialized agency within the Ministry of Defence
- Jurisdiction: Croatia
- Headquarters: Sarajevska cesta 7 Zagreb, Croatia
- Preceding agency: Military Security Agency (VSA)
- Website: morh.hr

Director
- Currently: Major General Ivan Turkalj since 10 August 2023

The Military Security and Intelligence Agency (Croatian: Vojna sigurnosno-obavještajna agencija, VSOA) is the intelligence agency of the Ministry of Defence and the Croatian Armed Forces. It is tasked with advancing Croatia's military and counterintelligence objectives through collecting and analyzing intelligence from around the world and conducting covert operations.

It was founded in 2006 upon the formation of the Croatian security and intelligence system, a domestic intelligence community. The Director of the VSOA is appointed or dismissed by a joint decision made by the President of Croatia and the Prime Minister of Croatia. The VSOA is focused on providing intelligence for the Croatian military while the civilian Security and Intelligence Agency (SOA) does the same for the Croatian government.

== Tasks ==
As an organizational unit within the Croatian Ministry of Defense, the VSOA is tasked with supporting the Ministry of Defense and the Croatian Armed Forces in defending the existence, sovereignty, independence and territorial integrity of the Republic of Croatia.

The VSOA collects, analyzes, processes and evaluates information on other nations' military and defense systems, external actions that may impact Croatia's defense and security, and activities abroad aimed at endangering the country's defense and security.

Within the territorial borders of the Republic of Croatia, the VSOA provides intelligence pertaining to actions individuals, groups and organizations within the country may take in endangering the defence of the state. In addition to detecting and monitoring, the VSOA is tasked with undertaking activities to deter actions that may endanger the defence of the state.

In accordance with Article 26 and 33 of the Act on the Security Intelligence System of the Republic of Croatia, the VSOA is limited to gathering information, which may temporarily restrict certain constitutional human rights and basic freedoms, on employees or members of the Croatian Ministry of Defence and Armed Forces.

== Directors ==
No.	Name	Term Start	Term End
1	Major General Gordan Čačić	2006	2008
2	Lieutenant General Darko Grdić	2008	2012
3	Brigadier General Zdravko Klanac	2012	2015
4	Brigadier General Ivica Kinder	2015	2023
5	Major General Ivan Turkalj	2023	Incumbent

== See also ==
- Croatian security and intelligence system
- Security and Intelligence Agency (SOA)
- Ministry of Defence

== Sources ==
- O Vojnoj sigurnosno-obavještajnoj agenciji (in Croatian)
