= Maritime Security Response Team =

Maritime security unit of the US Coast Guard

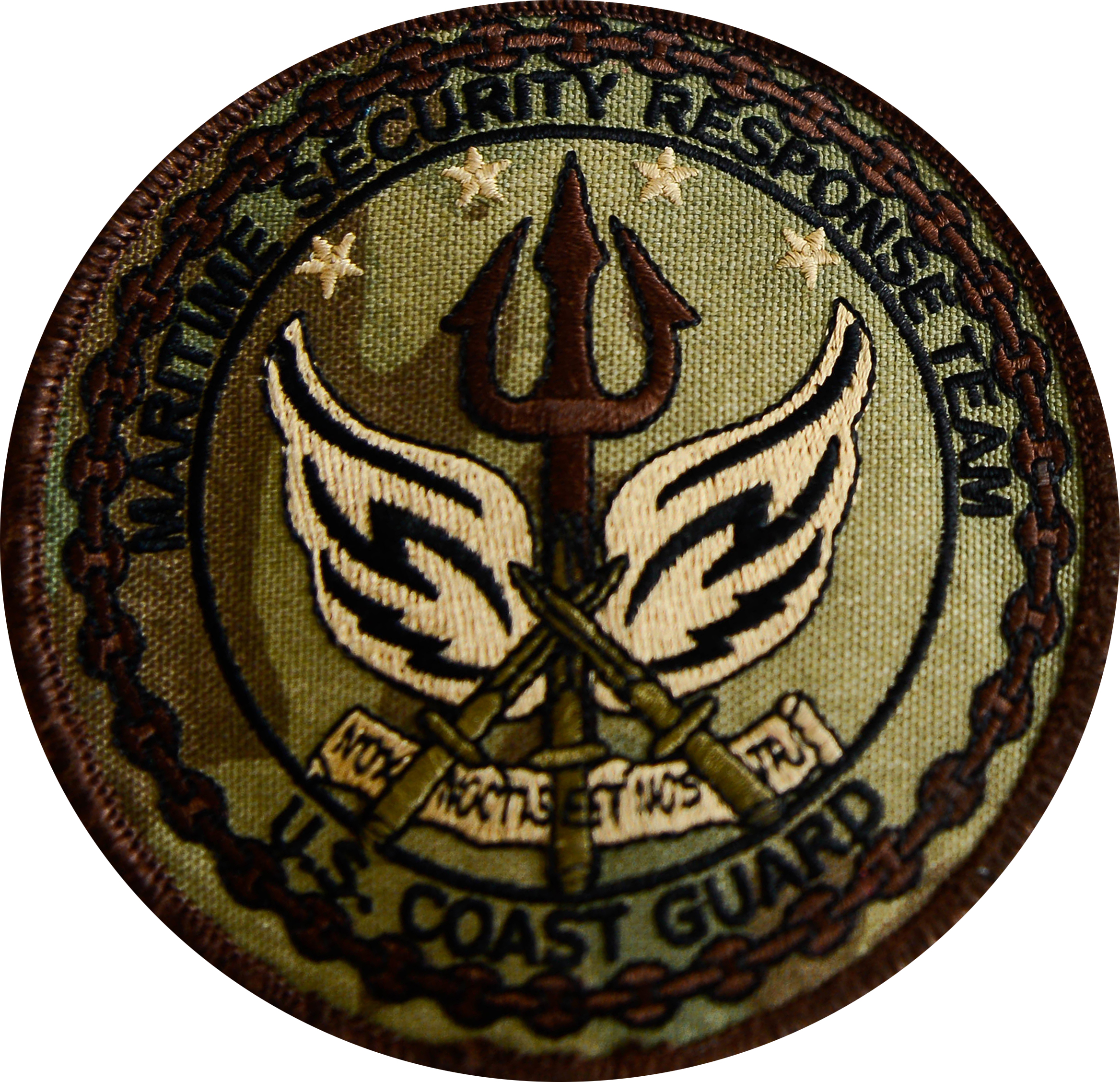
- MSRT patch
- Active: 2004 (de facto); Officially formed in 2006 (MSRT West, 2013)
- Country: United States of America
- Agency: United States Coast Guard
- Type: Police tactical unit
- Role: Counterterrorism; Counter narcotics operations Counterproliferation; Counter piracy
- Part of: Deployable Specialized Forces
- Motto: "Nox Noctis est Nostri"; The Night is Ours

Structure
- Operators: 307 (2020)
- Subunits: MSRT-East (Chesapeake, Virginia); MSRT-West (San Diego, California)

Notables
- Significant operation(s): Global War on Terrorism: Operation Enduring Freedom; Operation Enduring Freedom – Horn of Africa; Operation Ocean Shield; Operation Iraqi Freedom; Operation Martillo; Operation Inherent Resolve; 2025 United States military campaign against cartels; Operation Southern Spear; U.S.–Venezuelan oil blockade seizures

The Maritime Security Response Team (MSRT) is a specialized tactical unit of the United States Coast Guard and forms part of the Deployable Specialized Forces. It is a globally deployable unit specializing in high-risk boarding, direct action variability (ranging from close-quarters combat to precision marksmanship), helicopter insertion, advanced maritime interdiction, and response to CBRNE threats (chemical, biological, radiological, nuclear, explosive).

== History ==
In 2004, a unit named the Security Response Team One (SRT-1) was founded as a Coast Guard unit for specialized maritime drug interdictions, boardings, and operations. The SRT-1 eventually evolved into the Enhanced-Maritime Safety and Security Team (Enhanced-MSST), and the present Maritime Security Response Team in 2006.

== Organization ==
Most MSRT members come from the TACLET and MSST Teams primarily made up of the rate Maritime Law Enforcement Specialist (ME). There are two MSRT teams: MSRT-East stationed in Chesapeake, Virginia, and MSRT-West stationed in San Diego, California.

- Direct Action Section (DAS) are the MSRT's primary assault force. DAS members may include a Team Leader, Comms, Breachers, Medics, Precision Marksmen, Observation members (snipers/observers), and team members trained to identify Chemical, Biological, Nuclear, Radiological (CBRN) threats. These assault force teams train extensively in advanced close quarters combat and advanced combat marksmanship. They are well-trained to quickly and surreptitiously board suspicious vessels, secure gas and oil platforms or secure land-based targets by fast-roping from helicopters or using other undisclosed methods to neutralize enemy personnel.
- Tactical Delivery Team (TDT) and the boat assault force are trained in advanced vessel delivery tactics and stealthy delivery of the main assault force (DAS) as well as follow on forces.

They often train with Naval Special Warfare (SEALs) (SWCC), Army Special Operations (Airborne), Marine Raiders (MARSOC) and other Special Operations forces, including some foreign units.

== Capabilities ==
- Counterterrorism (CT)
- Direct Action (DA)
- Advanced Interdiction (AI)
- Hostage Rescue/Personnel Recovery
- Small Unit Tactics
- Counter Assault
- Tactical Maritime Law Enforcement
- Medium to High-risk boarding (Level III & IV) "VBSS"
- Airborne Use of Force (AUF)
- K9 explosive detection teams
- CBRNE
- Counterproliferation
- Underwater Port Security (only MSRT West)
- Personnel security

== Operations ==
Coast Guard MSRT personnel boarding Venezuelan oil tanker Operation Southern Spear on December 10, 2025, part of crisis in Venezuela

MSRT have conducted numerous global deployments in support of counterterrorism, maritime security, and law enforcement missions. They have supported operations in the Middle East, including participation in Operation Enduring Freedom, Operation Inherent Resolve, and missions in the Horn of Africa. In Central America, MSRT units have conducted high-risk boardings and interdictions targeting drug cartels, contributing to counter-narcotics efforts such as Operation Martillo, and recent operations against transnational criminal organizations in Venezuela. Between fiscal years 2015 and 2019, the MSRT deployed 183 times.

== See also ==
- Maritime Safety and Security Team
- TACLET
