= Deployable Specialized Forces =

- Active: July 20, 2007 – October 1, 2013, Deployable Operations Group (DOG) formerly 2013 – active Deployable Specialized Forces (DSF) reorganized
- Country: United States of America
- Branch: United States Coast Guard
- Type: Counterterrorism
- Role: Counterterrorism; Counter narcotics operations Counterproliferation; Counter piracy Rapid deployment force Expeditionary warfare
- Size: ≈2,000
- Part of: Department of Homeland Security
- Nickname: "DOG Teams" "DSF Teams"
- Engagements: Global War on Terrorism: Operation Enduring Freedom; Operation Enduring Freedom – Philippines; Operation Enduring Freedom – Horn of Africa; Operation Ocean Shield; Operation Iraqi Freedom; Operation Martillo; Operation Inherent Resolve; 2025 United States military campaign against cartels; Operation Southern Spear; U.S.–Venezuelan oil blockade seizures

The Deployable Specialized Forces (DSF), formerly the Deployable Operations Group, are part of the United States Coast Guard that provide highly equipped, trained and organized deployable specialized forces, to the Coast Guard, United States Department of Homeland Security (DHS), United States Department of Defense (DoD) and inter-agency operational and tactical commanders. The command was formerly headquartered in Arlington County, Virginia, where it was established on July 20, 2007, and was commanded by a captain. It was decommissioned by the commandant of the Coast Guard, Admiral Robert J. Papp Jr. on October 1, 2013, with units previously assigned to the DOG being split between Coast Guard Pacific and Atlantic Area commands. The units were subsequently reorganized under Deployable Specialized Forces (DSF).

Missions of deployable specialized forces units include high-risk, high-profile tasks such as counterterrorism, diving operations, intelligence-cued boarding operations, visit, board, search, and seizure, threat assessments involving nuclear, and biological, or chemical weapons, as well as detecting and, if necessary, stopping or arresting submerged divers.

In 2026, the Deployable Specialized Forces will be replaced by a new unified Coast Guard command the Special Missions Command (SMC). By October 2026, the new command will have an initial operating capability.

== Distinctive elements ==
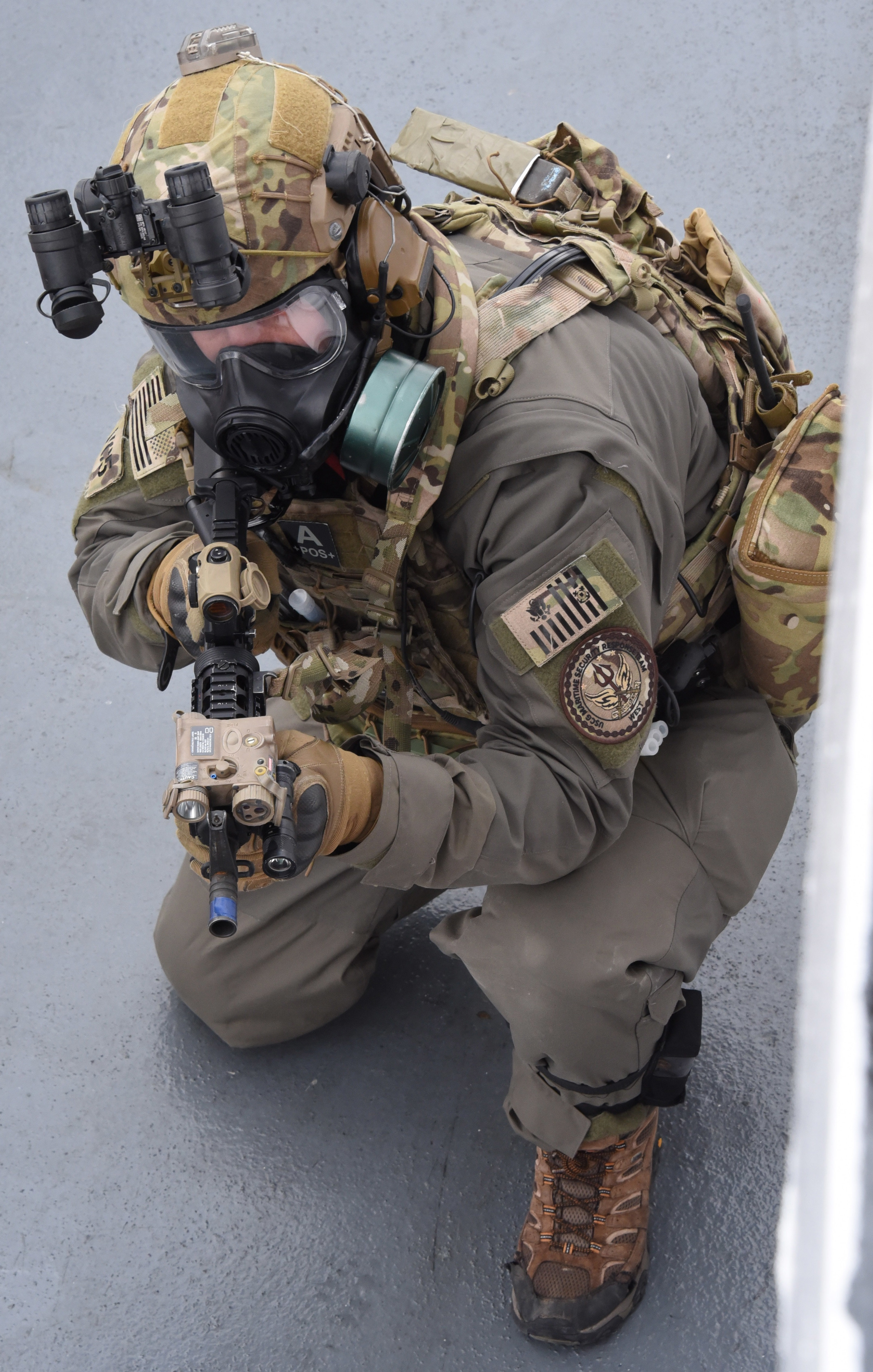
MSRT West trains for a simulated terrorist threat aboard the vessel

The Deployable Specialized Forces purpose is to develop systems and processes for standardized training, equipment, organization, planning, and scheduling of rapidly deployable specialized forces to execute mission objectives in support of tactical and operational commands. Since 2007, the unit has deployed throughout the world in support of national interests and requirements as tailored and integrated force packages. This included response to the 2010 Haiti earthquake, in support of the Deepwater Horizon oil spill in the Gulf of Mexico, and more recently deploying specialized counter piracy boarding teams to the Middle East, such as Operation Ocean Shield, where TACLET and MSST teams part of Combined Task Force 151 were an integral role in Somali counterpiracy. In addition, since 2007, DSF units have taken part in nine of the 11 largest maritime cocaine seizures.

Deployable Specialized Forces are not special operations forces, as they are not a part of United States Special Operations Command (USSOCOM) since the Coast Guard does not operate under the Department of Defense.

Deployable Specialized Forces also had health services technicians who were attached to medical teams operating within differing commands. These technicians supported roles in Afghanistan, Iraq, and other areas with Navy and Department of Defense groups.

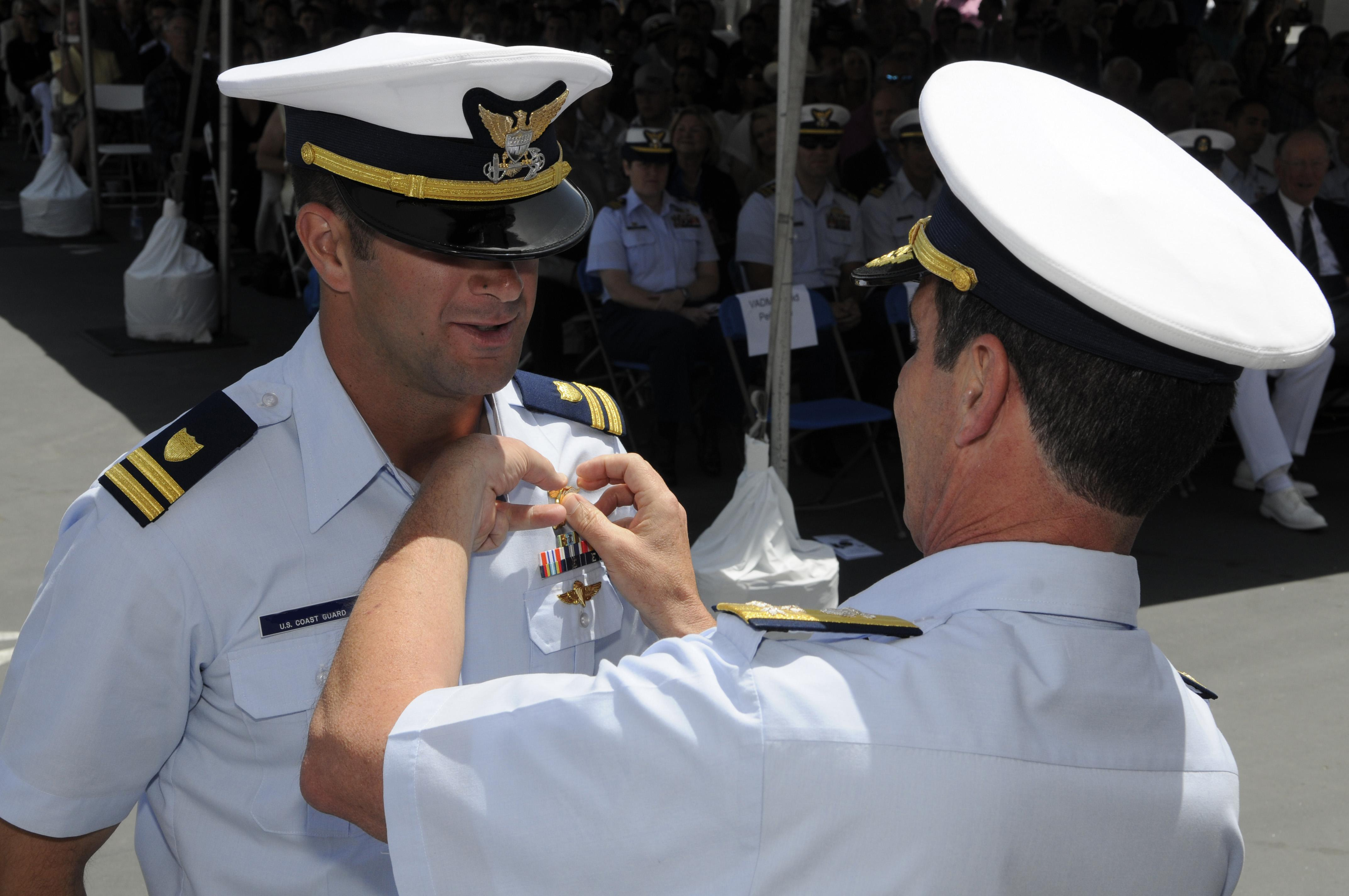
Coast Guard SEAL being pinned with his SEAL Trident

Deployable Specialized Forces manages Coast Guard personnel assigned to the Navy Expeditionary Combat Command (NECC). The unit also had a high level of involvement in the Coast Guard SEAL Program; candidates could attend United States Naval Special Warfare Training and serve with Navy SEAL teams. While the program is currently suspended, there were, as of 2017, several Coast Guardsmen serving on SEAL teams.

== Organization ==
United States Coast Guard patch in MultiCam pattern worn by DSF forces

The Deployable Specialized Forces (DSF) are composed of around 2,000 Coast Guard personnel, including the following unit types:

=== Advanced Interdiction Team ===
U.S. Coast Guardsmen assigned to Advanced Interdiction Team 4 fast-rope

Advanced Interdiction Teams are deployable assets composed of various Coast Guard DSF forces drawn primarily from MSRT and MSSTs. Teams of around 12 operators typically augment U.S. Navy vessels to conduct high-level Visit Board Search and Seizure (VBSS), training, and assistance. Teams specialize in counter-narcotics, counterproliferation, and maritime interdiction operations.

=== Maritime Security Response Team (MSRT) ===
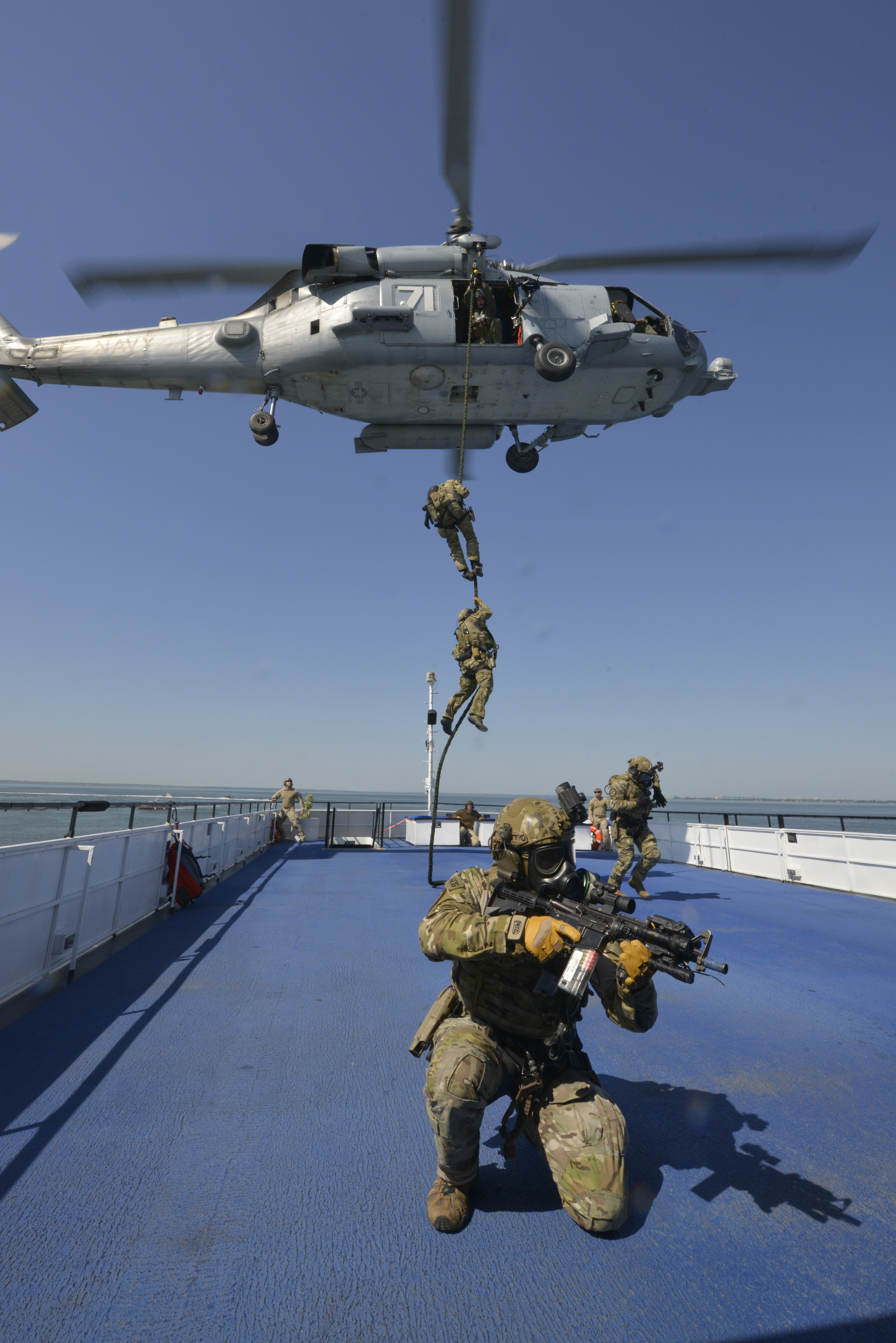
Maritime Security Response Team members fast-roping out of helicopter

The Maritime Security Response Team (MSRT) has existed in different iterations, but was formally established in 2006. It is one of two units within the Coast Guard that has counter-terrorism capabilities to conduct action against hostile targets. The first is MSRT-East based in Chesapeake, Virginia, the second is MSRT-West based in San Diego, California. The MSRT is trained to be the first response unit to potential terrorist threats, deny preemptive terrorist actions, execute security actions against armed hostiles and/or non-compliant threats, participate in port level counter-terrorism exercises, execute tactical facility entry, and educate other forces on Coast Guard's counter-terrorism procedures. Although the MSRT's focus is primarily on the safety and security of homeland defense, it is capable of rapidly deploying worldwide in response to incidents. Other specialized units and federal agencies that MSRTs routinely train with include the Navy's SEALs, Special Boat Teams (SWCC) and Explosive Ordnance Disposal (EOD); Marine Corps' MARSOC, Maritime Raid Force, and Force Recon; Army's Special Forces, 160th Special Operations Aviation Regiment, and Air Force Special Operations. Law enforcement agencies include Secret Service, FBI (HRT), Bureau of Alcohol, Tobacco, Firearms and Explosives (ATF), the Border Patrol Tactical Unit (BORTAC) & (BORSTAR), the Customs and Border Protection Special Response Teams (SRT), and other various SWAT/Special Mission Units. Their motto, as seen on their unit patch, is "Nox Noctis est Nostri", which translates from Latin to English is "The Night is Ours".

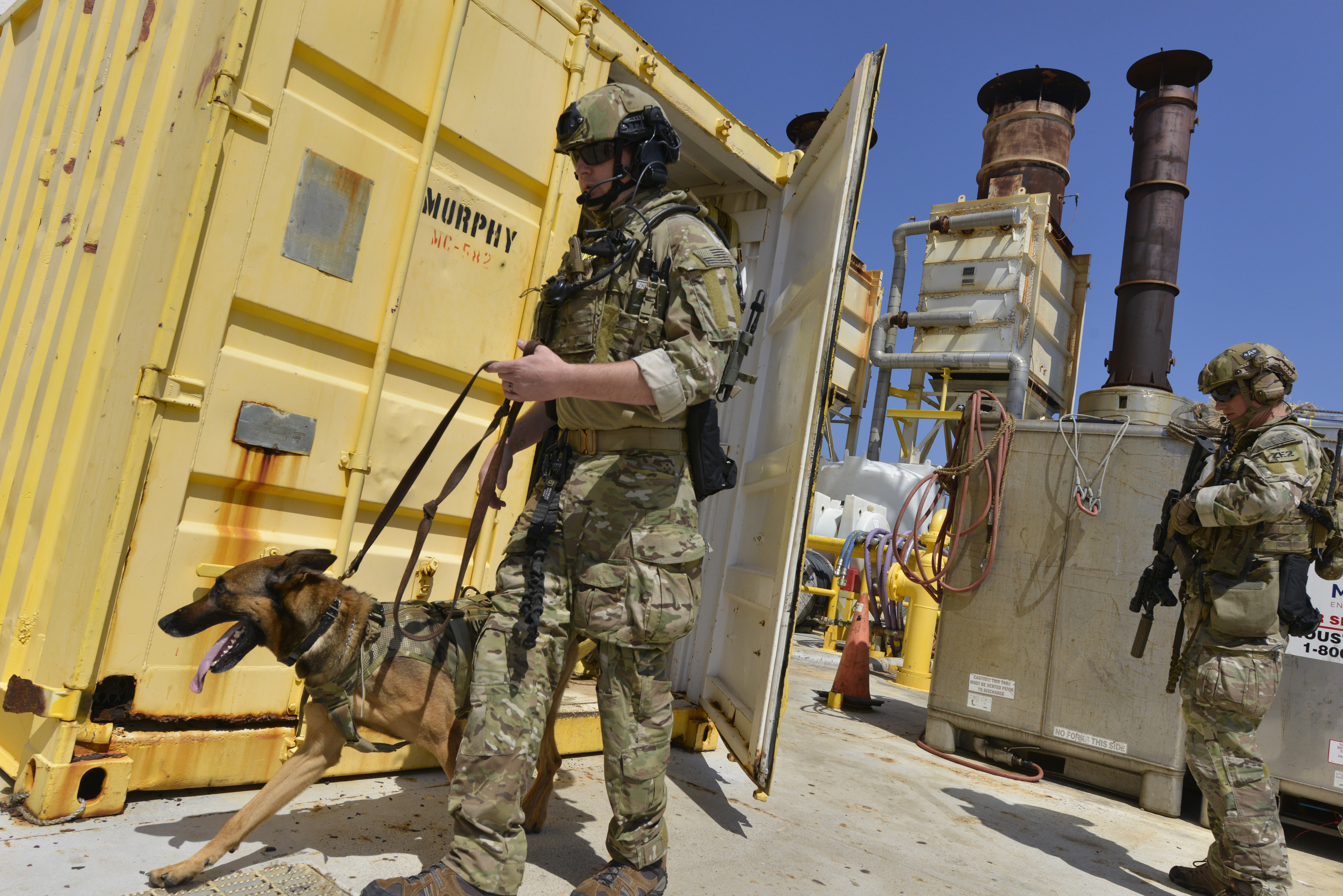
MSRT K-9 Sweep

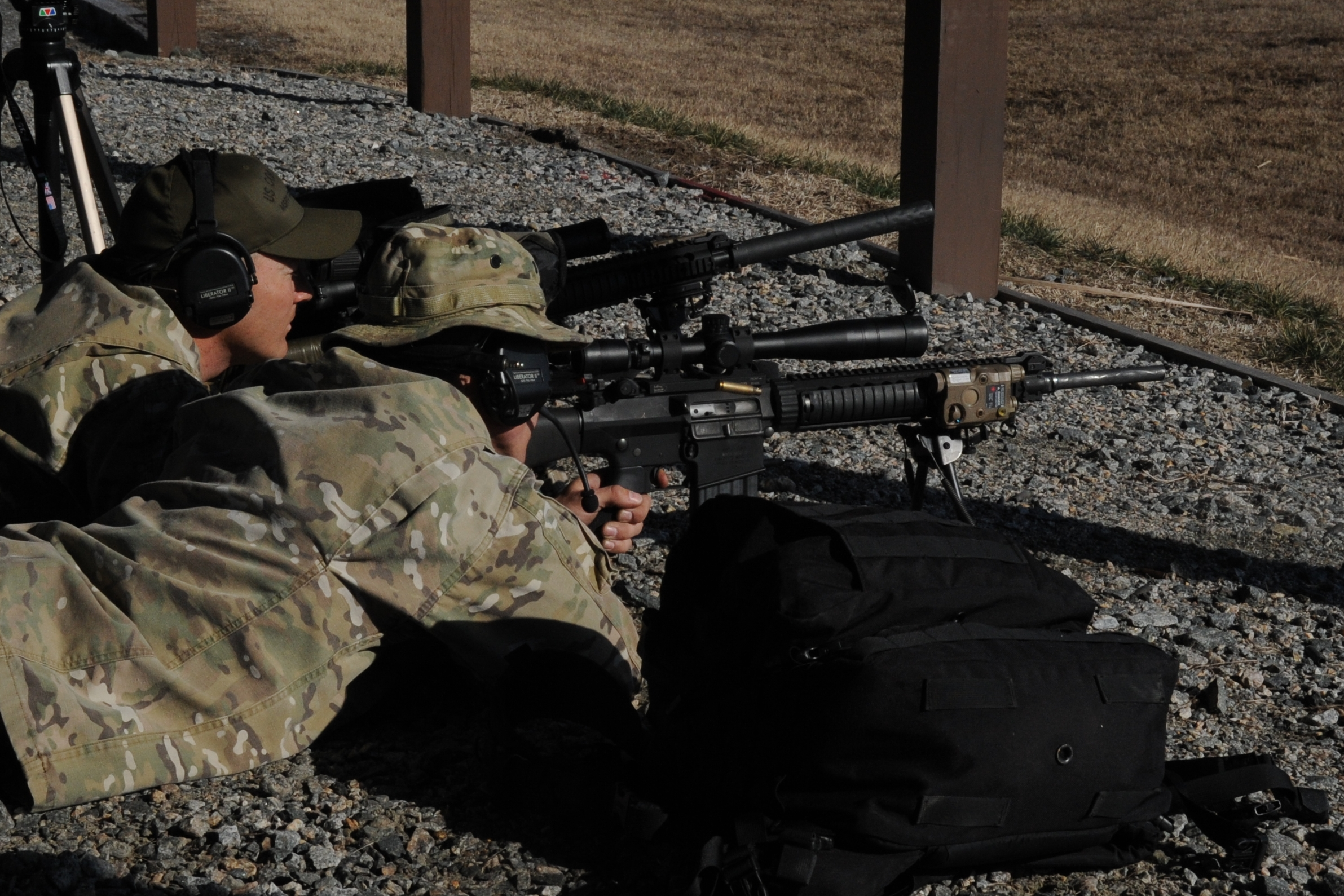
MSRT Precision Marksmen Observer Team

MSRT Special Capabilities include:

- Counterterrorism (CT)
- Direct Action (DA)
- Advanced Interdiction (AI)
- Hostage Rescue/Personnel Recovery
- Small Unit Tactics
- Counter Assault
- Tactical Maritime Law Enforcement
- Medium to High-risk boarding (Level III & IV) "VBSS"
- Airborne Use of Force (AUF)
- K9 explosive detection teams
- CBRNE
- Counterproliferation
- Underwater Port Security (only MSRT-West)

MSRT members are selected through experienced maritime law enforcement members, often selected from MSST and TACLET teams. Many of these members are already highly trained and qualified when selected.

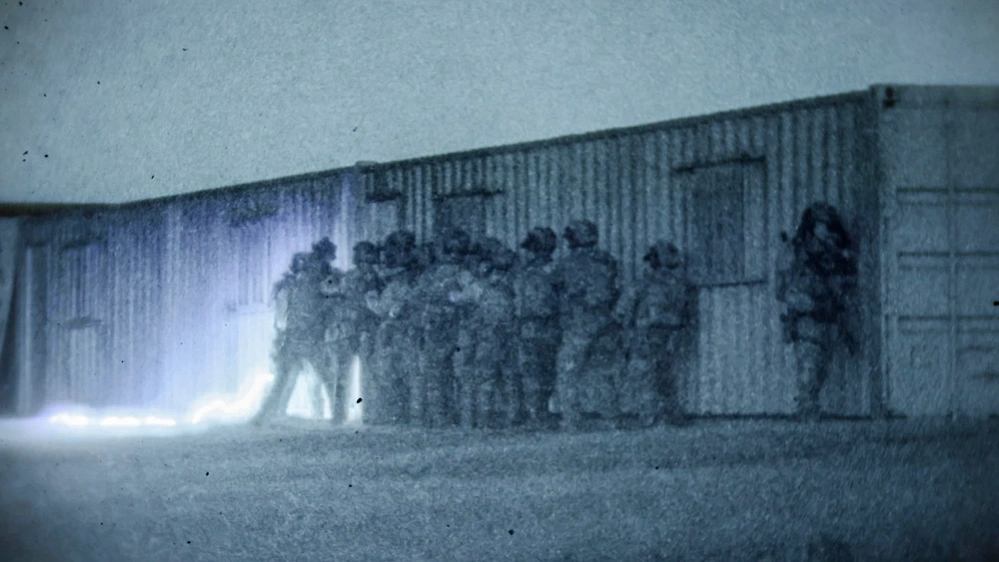
Army Green Berets from 5th Special Forces Group (Airborne) conduct a nighttime raid with the U.S. Coast Guard's elite Deployable Specialized Forces (MSRT), Direct Action Section

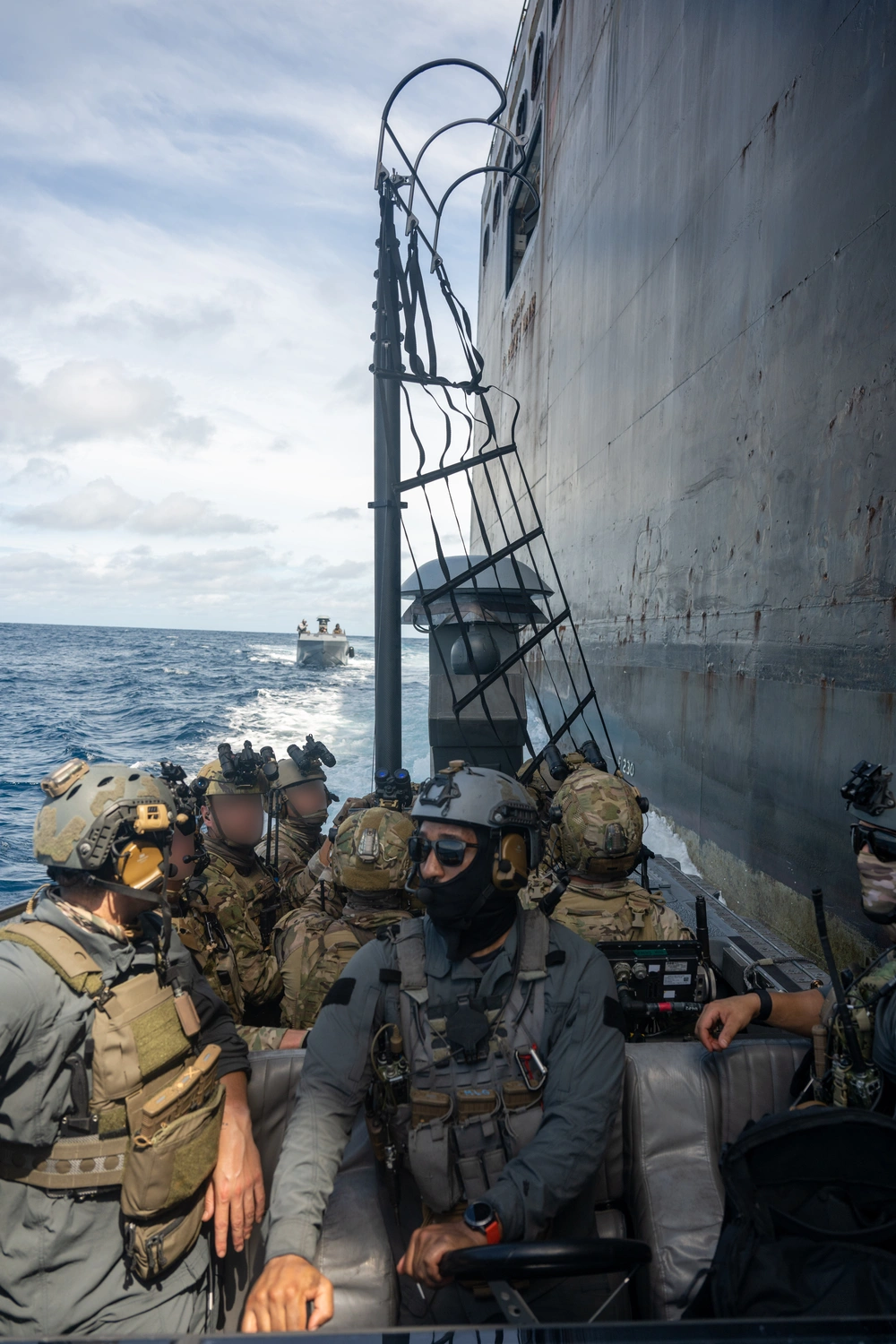
U.S. Navy SEALs with Coast Guard MSRT in VBSS training

=== Maritime Safety & Security Teams (MSST) ===
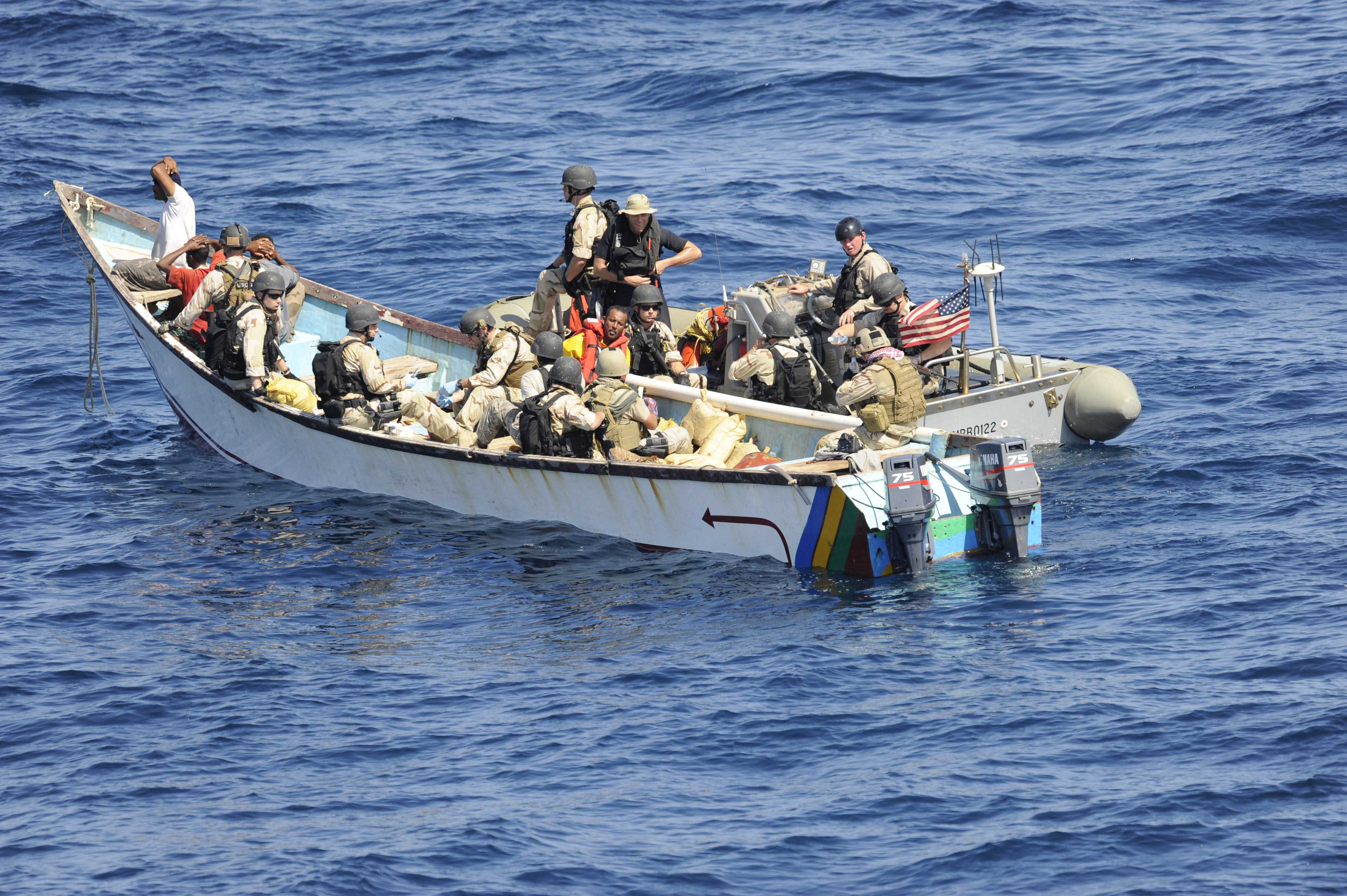
MSST conduct counter-piracy operations off the coast of Somalia and Gulf of Aden

Maritime Safety and Security Teams (MSSTs) are counterterrorism (Force-Presence) units created under the Maritime Transportation Security Act of 2002 (MTSA) in response to the terrorist attacks of September 11, 2001. The eleven MSSTs provide both waterborne and shore-side counterterrorism and force protection for strategic shipping, high interest vessels, and critical infrastructure. MSSTs are a quick response force capable of rapid worldwide deployment via air, ground or sea transportation in response to changing threat conditions and evolving Maritime Homeland Security (MHS) mission requirements. Multi-mission capability facilitates augmentation for other selected Coast Guard missions. Other units and federal agencies that MSSTs train with are the Navy's Special Boat Teams (SWCC), Border Patrol Search, Trauma, and Rescue (BORSTAR), CBP Air and Marine Operations, FBI, and other various SWAT Teams.

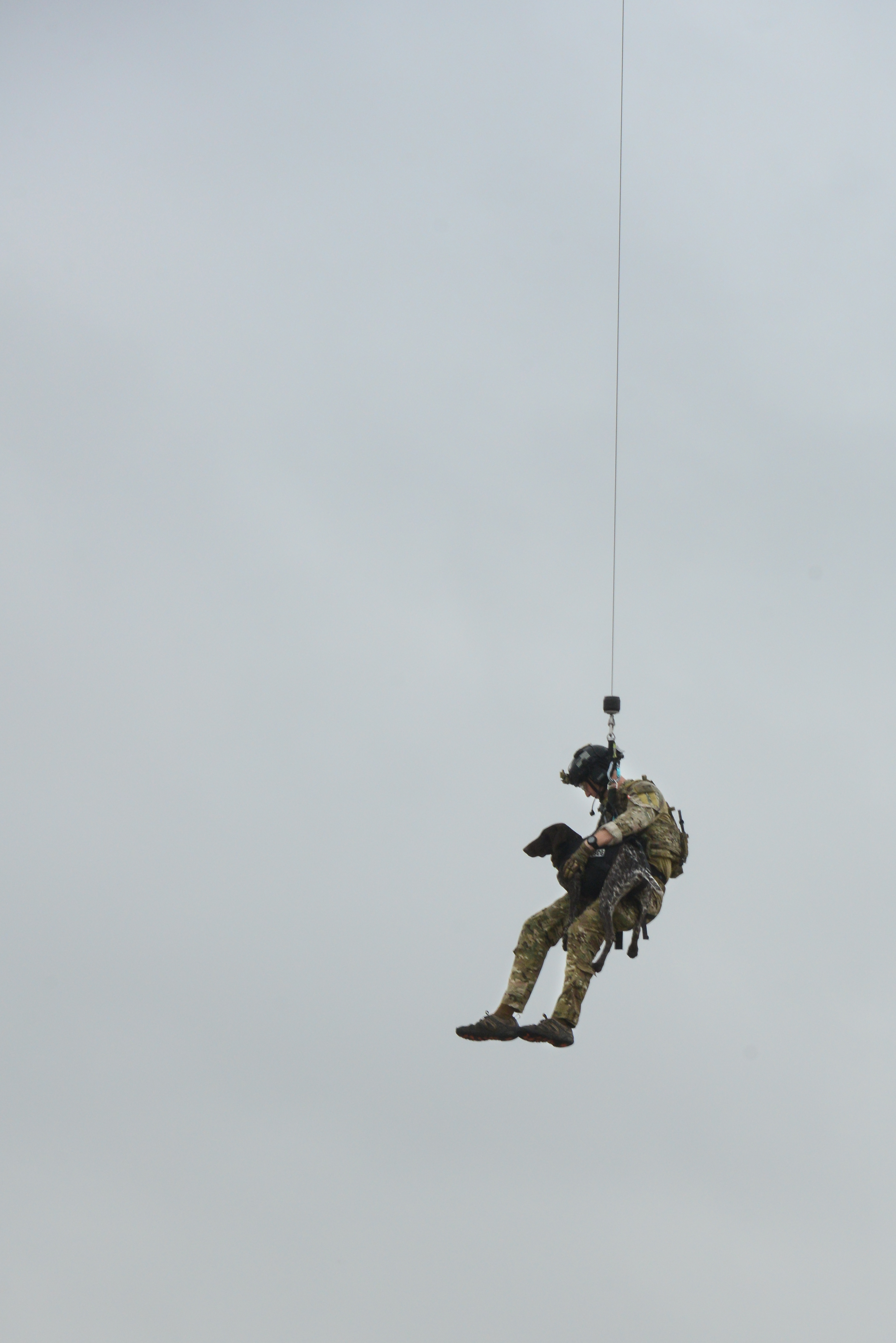
MSST crewman and his K9 being lowered down

MSST special capabilities include:

- Maritime interdiction and law enforcement
- Counter-terrorism/Force Protection
- Security detail
- CBRN-E Detection
- Search and Rescue (limited)
- Port Protection/Anti-sabotage
- Dive Lockers
- K9 Handling Teams (Explosive detection)
- Tactical Boat Operations
- Non-compliant boarding operations

=== National Strike Force (NSF) ===
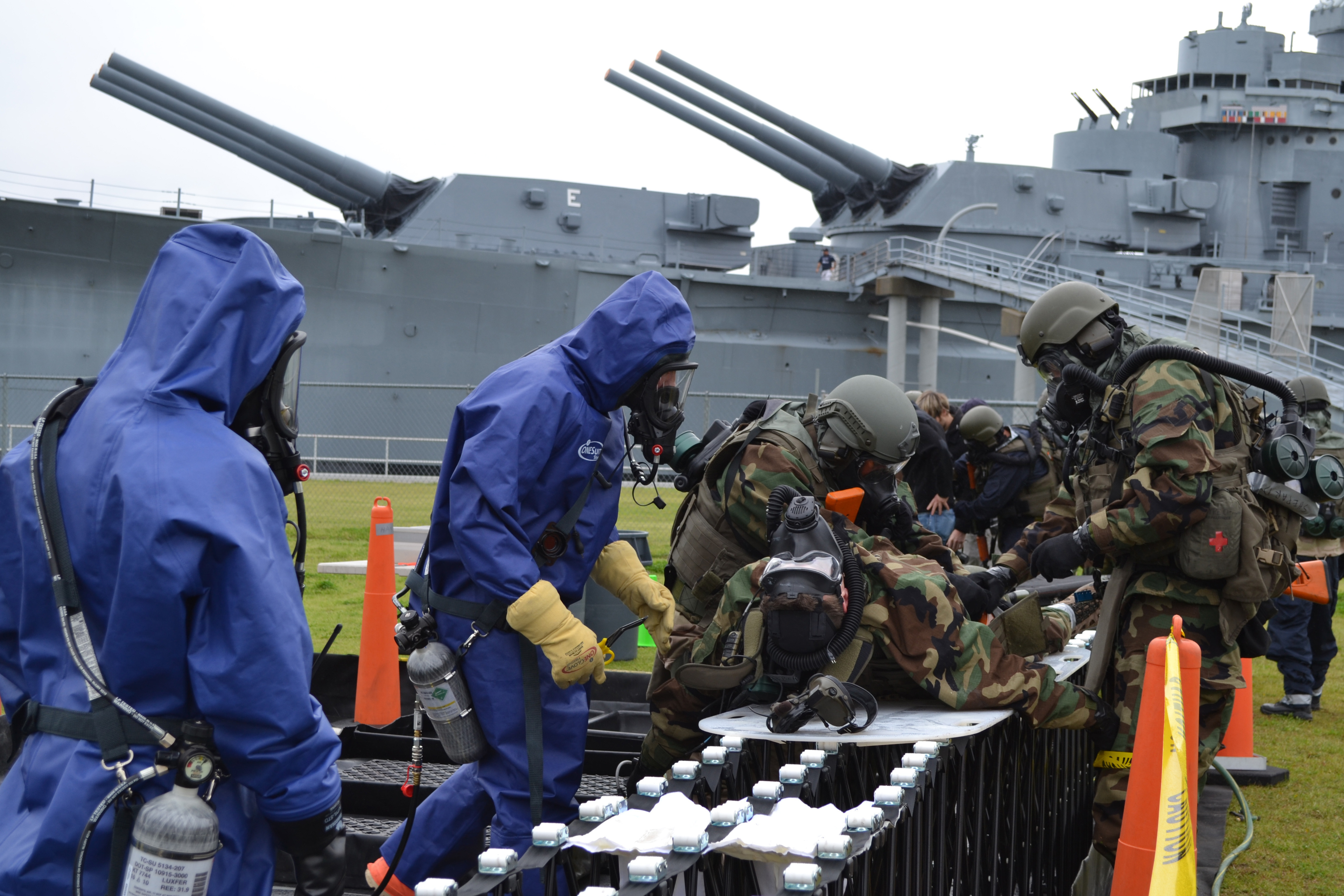
Coast Guardsmen, both with the Strike Team, perform decontamination procedures on an FBI SWAT member with artificial wounds during a joint agency exercise

The National Strike Force (NSF) was established in 1973 as a direct result of the Federal Water Pollution Control Act of 1972. The NSF provides highly trained, experienced personnel and specialized equipment to Coast Guard and other federal agencies to facilitate preparedness for and response to oil discharges, hazardous materials releases, and weapons of mass destruction (WMD) incidents.

The National Strike Force (NSF) includes five units with over 200 active duty, civilian, reserve, and auxiliary personnel. It is commanded by a captain.

- The National Strike Force Coordination Center (NSFCC) provides support and standardization guidance to the three strike teams.
- Each Strike Team is a highly trained cadre of Coast Guardsmen who maintain and rapidly deploy with specialized equipment and incident management skills wherever needed. The strike teams are recognized worldwide as expert authorities in the preparation for and response to the effects resulting from oil discharges, hazardous substance releases, weapons of mass destruction events, and other emergencies on behalf of the American public. There are three strike teams within the NSF. The Atlantic Strike Team is based at Fort Dix, New Jersey, the Gulf Strike Team is based at the Coast Guard Aviation Training Center in Mobile, Alabama, and the Pacific Strike Team is based at Novato, California.
- The Public Information Assistance Team (PIAT) provides emergency public information services to Federal On-Scene Coordinators primarily during oil spills and hazardous material releases. It is located at the National Strike Force Coordination Center.
- The Incident Management Assist Team (CG-IMAT) assists Operational Commanders in preparing for, responding to, and mitigating the effects of all risks and all hazard incidents and events
  - Response Support Capability: The CG-IMAT provides qualified and proficient National Incident Management System (NIMS) Type 1 and Type 2 Incident Management Assistance Teams and individuals to assist operational commanders manage incidents.
  - Training Support Capability: The CG-IMAT assists Areas, Districts, Sectors, Bases and Force Readiness Command (FORCECOM) by supporting Incident Command System (ICS) training and on-going efforts to qualify for position-specific qualifications.
  - Exercise Support Capability: The CG-IMAT assists in the design, planning, training, conduct and evaluation of exercises, plans, procedures and capabilities both at national and regional level

=== Naval Coastal Warfare ===
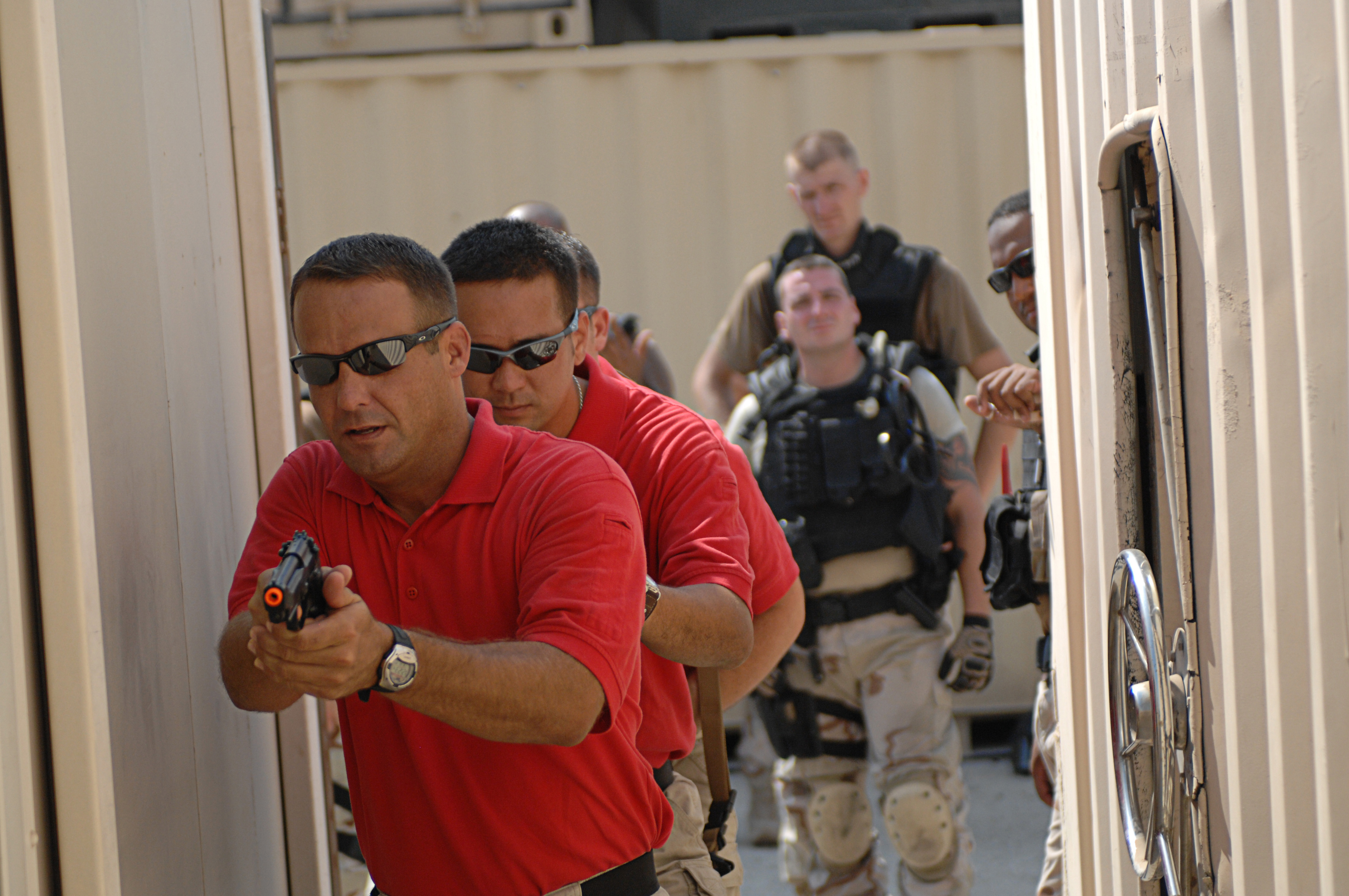
USCG Maritime Engagement Team conducts training in Middle East

Naval Coastal Warfare (NCW) These Coast Guard units are part of an interoperable force and are part of the Department of Defense international and domestic security. Similar to PSU's they provide anti-terrorism / force protection for forward deployed base camps and ports around the world where needed. Coast Guard billets assigned to NCW Groups support NECC expeditionary ops.

=== Port Security Units (PSU) ===
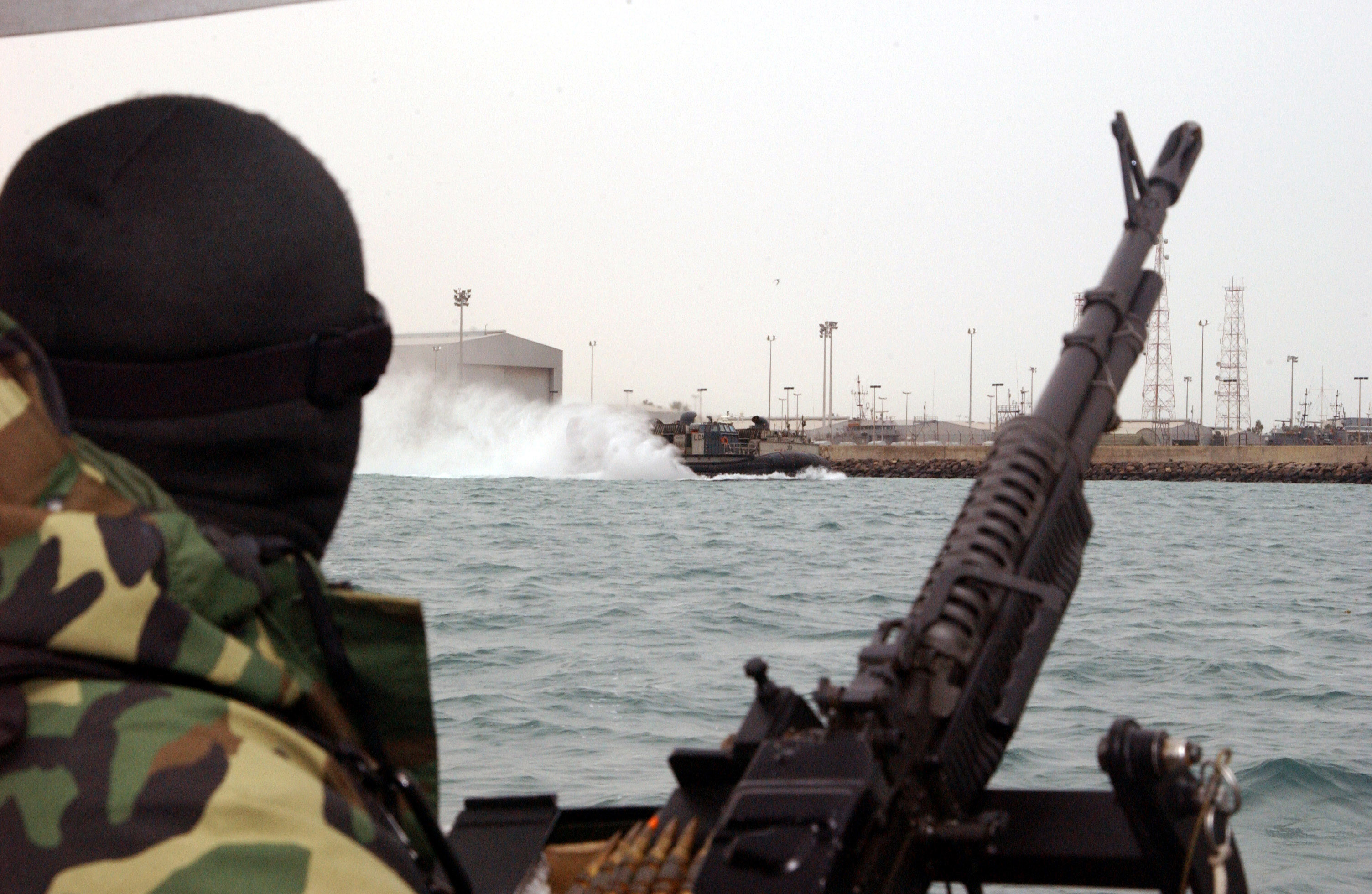
Port Security Unit 307 in Operation Iraqi Freedom

The Port Security program of the Coast Guard can be traced back all the way back to 1917 with the passage of the Espionage Act and due to the Black Tom explosion. Port Security Units are deployable expeditionary security and anti-terrorism units similar to Marine Corps Security Force Regiment or Air Force's Deployed Aircraft Ground Response Element (DAGRE). Port Security Units serve as a rapid reaction force, capable of worldwide deployment on short notice. Unlike any other Coast Guard Units, Port Security Units are the only sustained forward deployable unit, with the ability to deploy within 96 hours of a crisis and establish operations within 24 hours of arrival. PSUs are the only Coast Guard unit that uniquely train and provide ground combat security capability for the Coast Guard if needed. Other units that PSUs train and integrate with are Navy Expeditionary Combat Command or abroad in support of various Department of Defense operations. PSUs receive their initial training at Marine Corps Base Camp Lejeune's Special Missions Training Center.

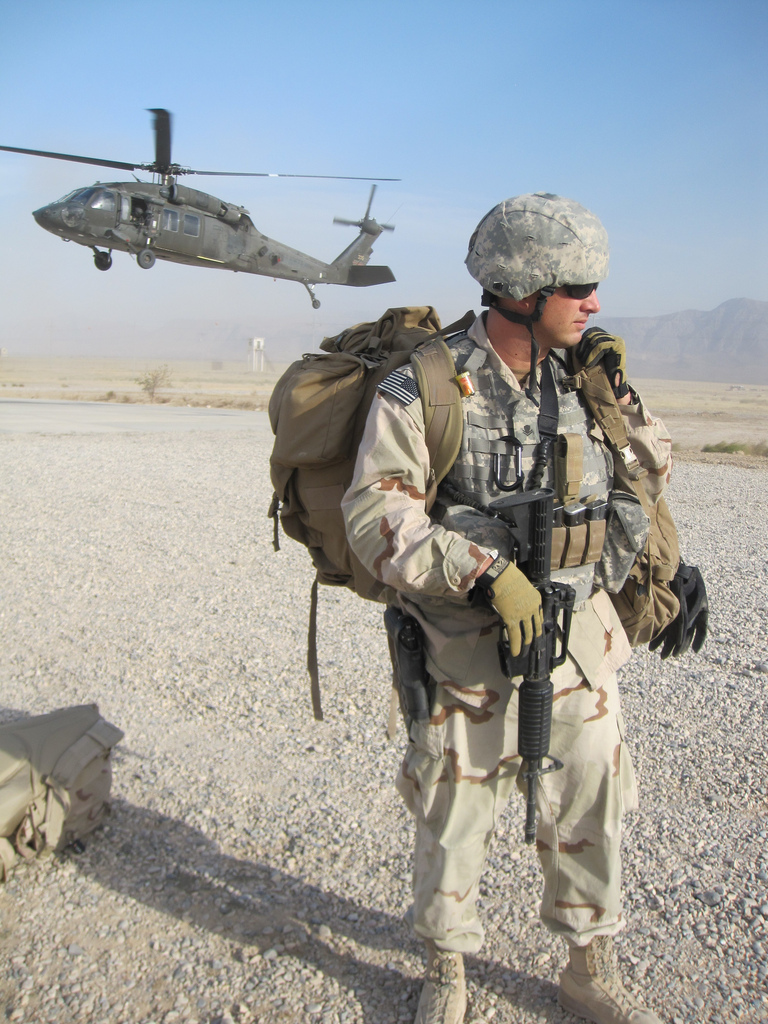
Coast Guard RAID team PSU reservist in Afghanistan

Port Security units are trained and equipped to provide:

- Anti-Terrorism/Force Protection (ATFP) Security missions
- Ground Combat
- Counter-Piracy
- Maritime Interdiction
- Military Combat Operations
- Humanitarian Response
- Inspections
- Amphibious operations
- Point defense of strategic shipping, designated critical infrastructure, and high value assets.

=== Regional Dive Lockers ===
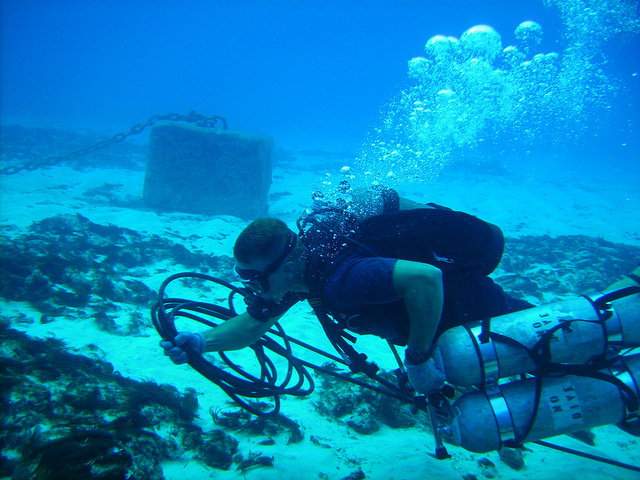
Coast Guard diver, moves underwater equipment in preparation for lifting operations. Coast Guard Regional Dive Locker West deployed with Coast Guard Cutter Sequoia to work on aids to navigation

The DSF has three Regional Dive Lockers that provide full-time diving capability for three primary missions: Ports and Waterways Coastal Security (PWCS); Aids to Navigation (ATON); and ship husbandry and repair in remote polar regions. The Dive Lockers, which became fully operational on October 1, 2008, following a cold water familiarization diving accident in the Arctic aboard U.S. Coast Guard Cutter Healy. Regional Dive Locker East (RDLE) is located at Portsmouth, Virginia, Regional Dive Locker West (RDLW) is located at San Diego, California and Regional Dive locker Pacific (RDLP) which is located in Honolulu, Hawaii.

=== Tactical Law Enforcement Teams (TACLET) ===
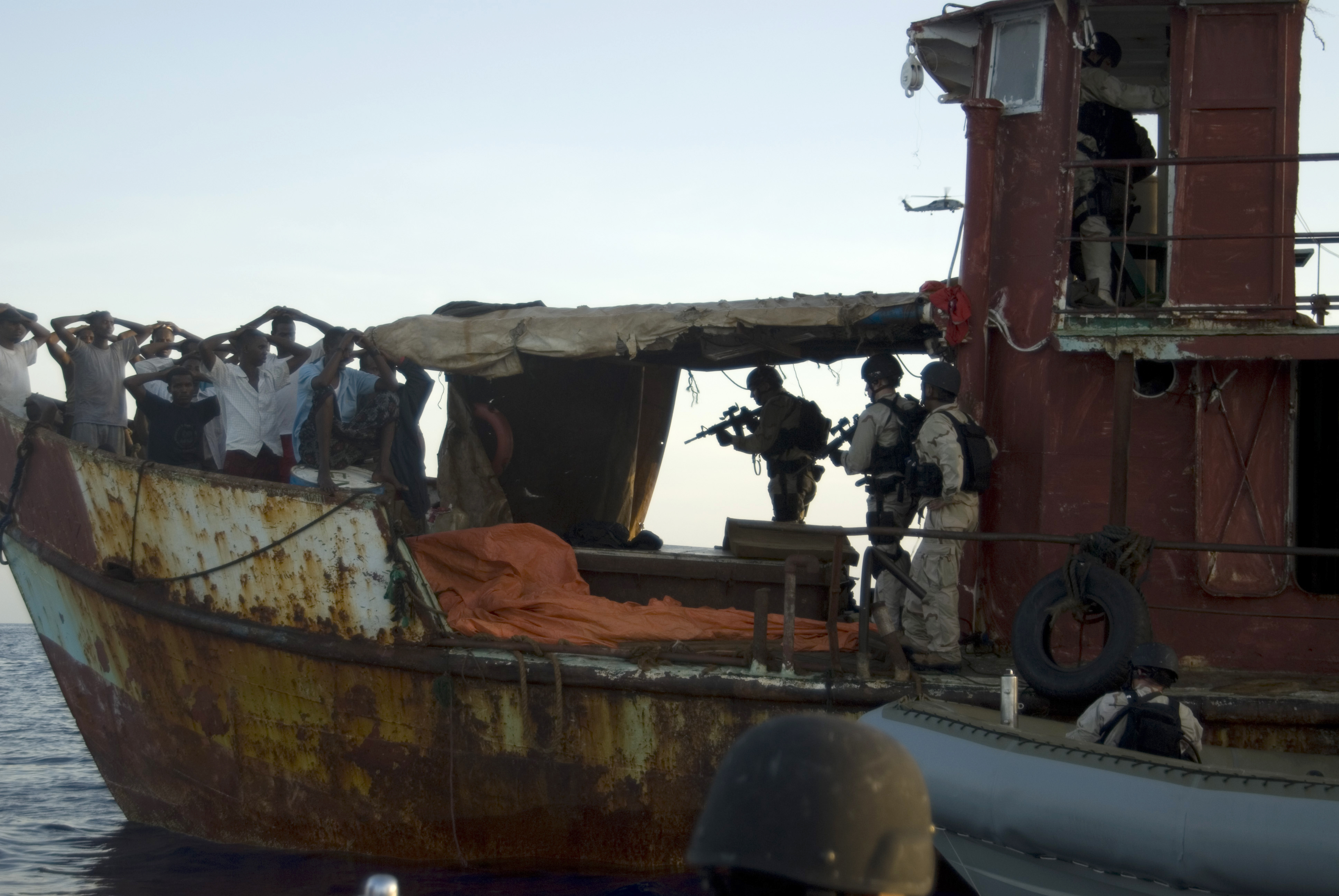
A boarding team from USS Gettysburg and Law Enforcement Detachment 409 capture suspected pirates off Somalia.

Tactical Law Enforcement Teams provide specialized Law Enforcement Detachments (LEDET) to conduct counter-narcotics law enforcement and maritime interdiction operations from U.S. and allied naval vessels. There are currently two units, Tactical Law Enforcement Team South based in Opa-locka, Florida and the Pacific Area Tactical Law Enforcement Team (PACTACLET) based in San Diego, California. The Coast Guard formally established the Law Enforcement Detachment program in 1982. Originally, LEDETs operated directly under Coast Guard "groups," local commands that operated under Coast Guard districts. Other federal agencies that TACLETs train with are the DEA Special Response Teams, ATF Special Response Teams, and various local SWAT Teams

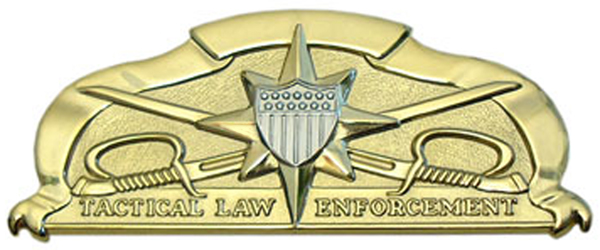
Tactical Law Enforcement Badge worn by qualified TACLET members.

TACLET groups duties include:

- Maritime interdiction missions
- Counter-piracy
- Military combat operations
- Alien migration interdiction
- Military force protection
- Counter terrorism
- Homeland security
- Humanitarian response

=== Unit Level Testing ===
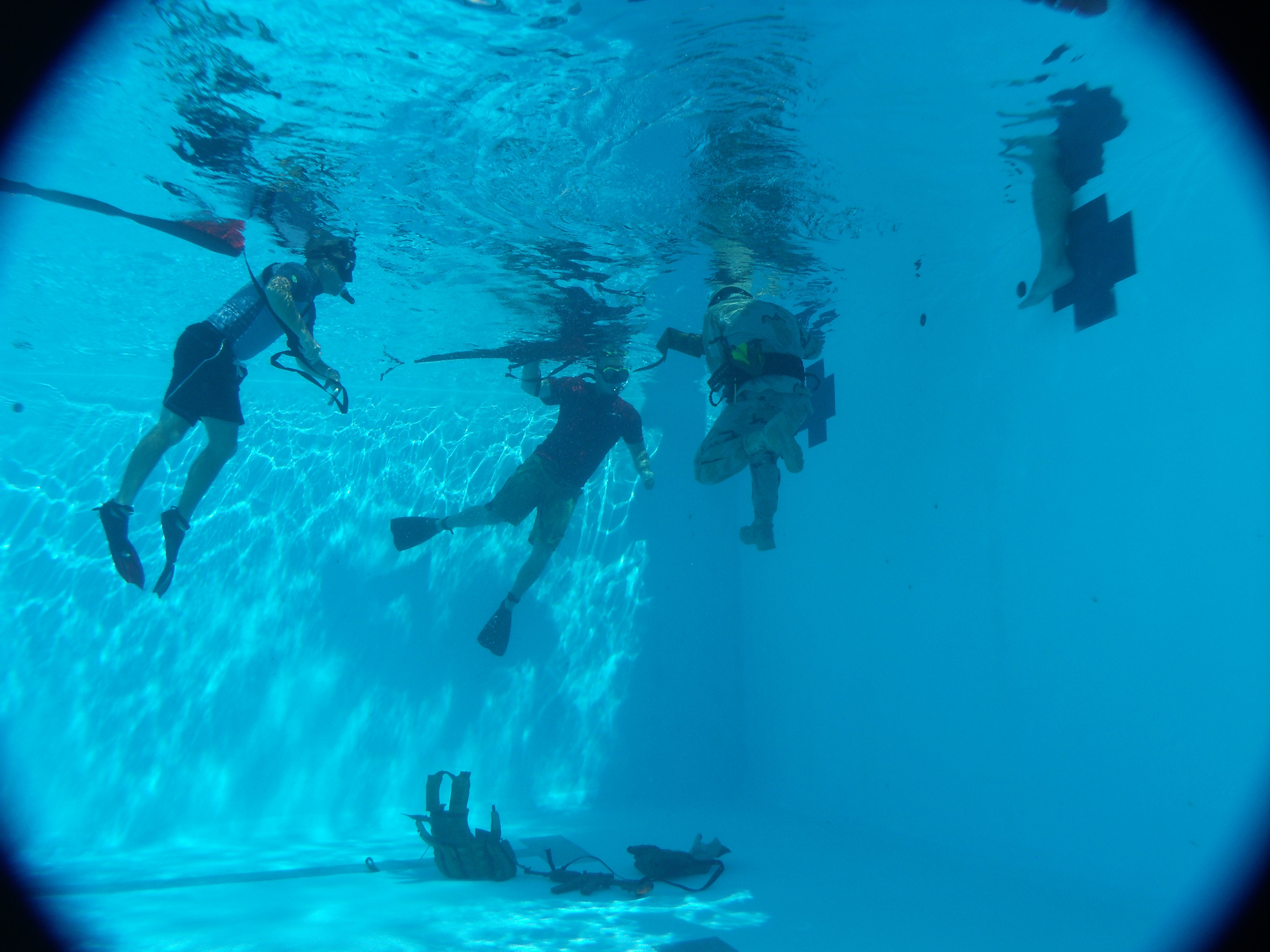
Coast Guard MSST 91110 members perform water survival training.

The standard unit level testing falls into three levels of physical fitness. The test is very similar to the FBI test or applying to a local or state police agencies SWAT team. The units have an indoctrination phase sometimes referred to as "Green Team". Each unit member will go through water survival training.

The Tier One Fitness test is:

Men / Women	All Ages
1.5 Mile Run	11:38 or under
Situps 1 Minute	42
Pushups 1 Minute	38
300m Sprint	48 Seconds
Vertical Jump	23 Inches
Under 12 Minute Swim (Side Stroke / Breaststroke)	500 Yards

The Tier Two fitness is:

Men	Under 30 Years Old
1.5 Mile Run	12:51 or under
Situps 1 Minute	38
Pushups 1 Minute	29
12 Minute Swim (Side Stroke / Breaststroke)	500 Yards
Sit and Reach	16.5 Inches

Women	Under 30 Years Old
1.5 Mile Run	15:26 or under
Situps 1 Minute	32
Pushups 1 Minute	23
12 Minute Swim (Side Stroke / Breaststroke)	400 Yards
Sit and Reach	19.25 Inches

== Operations ==
USCG TACLET boarding team interdicts suspected drug smuggling vessel

Coast Guard MSRT personnel boarding Venezuelan oil tanker Operation Southern Spear on December 10, 2025, part of crisis in Venezuela

Under the Maritime Drug Law Enforcement Act and UN resolutions, its mission includes seizing drugs in international waters or on behalf of partner nations. The United States Coast Guard is the only military branch with law enforcement capabilities to board and seize.

$	Description	USCG Asset	Date
$100 million	10,000 lbs of cocaine	USCG LEDET 409 with USCGC Resolute	24-Aug-09
$22 million	1,900 lbs of cocaine. A video from a CBP P-3 plane shows a shootout between the drug smugglers and TACLET operators.	USCG Tactical Law Enforcement Team South with Royal Netherland Navy	23-Nov-12
$569 million	17,000 lbs. of cocaine as part of a monthslong operations. LEDET team interdicted a Self-Propelled Semi-Submersible. A LEDET member was captured on film jumping onto the vessel, causing it to heave to. The dramatic video went viral and was cited by the President of the United States.	USCG LEDET, Pacific Area Tactical Law Enforcement Team (PACTACLET) with USCGC Munro	18-Jul-19
N/A	Cache of weapons consisted of thousands of AK-47 assault rifles, light machine guns, heavy sniper rifles, rocket-propelled grenade launchers, and crew served weapons. Other weapon components included barrels, stocks, optical scopes and weapon systems.	USCG Advanced Interdiction Team (AIT) with U.S. NAVY	11-Feb-21
N/A	Cache of weapons included dozens of advanced Russian-made anti-tank guided missiles, thousands of Chinese Type 56 assault rifles, and hundreds of PKM machine guns, sniper rifles and rocket-propelled grenades launchers. Other weapon components included advanced optical sights.	USCG Advanced Interdiction Team (AIT) with U.S. NAVY	7-May-21
N/A	Advanced Interdiction Team seized approximately 1,400 AK-47 assault rifles and 226,600 rounds of ammunition from a stateless fishing vessel during a flag verification boarding in accordance with customary international law in the North Arabian Sea.	USCG Advanced Interdiction Team (AIT) with U.S. NAVY	22-Dec-21
$4 million	(kg not listed) heroin	USCG Advanced Interdiction Team (AIT) with U.S. NAVY	27-Dec-21
$475 million	24,700 lbs of cocaine and 3,892 pounds of marijuana	USCG LEDET 101 and LEDET 401 with joint USCG & U.S. NAVY assets.	17-Sep-22
$69 million	1,986 lbs. of marijuana	USCG Law Enforcement Detachment (LEDET) 406 with U.S. NAVY	27-Ap-23
$42 million	1000 kg hashish, 802 kg methamphetamine	USCG Advanced Interdiction Team (AIT) with U.S. NAVY	21-Apr-23
$63 million	4,800 lbs of cocaine. USCG Tactical team shot and sank the drug smuggling speedboat.	USCG LEDET 110 and Helicopter Interdiction Tactical Squadron (HITRON)	04-June-24
$473 million	76,140 lbs illicit narcotics (61,740 lbs cocaine; 14,400 lbs marijuana) – largest single offload in Coast Guard history from 19 interdictions	Multiple USCG cutters including USCGC Hamilton (WMSL-753), LEDET teams, HITRON	25-Aug-25
$64.5 million	Over 10,000 lbs illicit narcotics (primarily cocaine) from multiple interdictions	USCGC Diligence (WMEC-616)	Sep-25
N/A (not released)	8,700 lbs cocaine from go-fast vessel	Multiple cutters under Operation Pacific Viper	Sep-25
$362 million	49,010 lbs cocaine – largest single-patrol seizure by any Coast Guard cutter in history	USCGC Stone (WMSL-758) with LEDET/HITRON under Operation Pacific Viper	Nov-25
N/A (not released)	20,000 lbs cocaine – single go-fast vessel record by a national security cutter	USCGC Munro (WMSL-755) with LEDET/HITRON teams	5-Dec-25
N/A (sanctions enforcement)	Crude oil tanker Skipper (approx. 1.8 million barrels Venezuelan crude) seized	USCG Deployable Specialized Forces (MSRT) with DoD support under Operation Southern Spear	10-Dec-25
N/A (sanctions enforcement)	Crude oil tanker (last docked in Venezuela, e.g., Centuries) apprehended	USCG Deployable Specialized Forces (MSRT) with DoD support under Operation Southern Spear	20-Dec-25
$3.8 billion	Nearly 510,000 lbs cocaine – record annual seizure	Multiple cutters, LEDET, HITRON under Operation Pacific Viper	FY 2025

== Notable service members ==
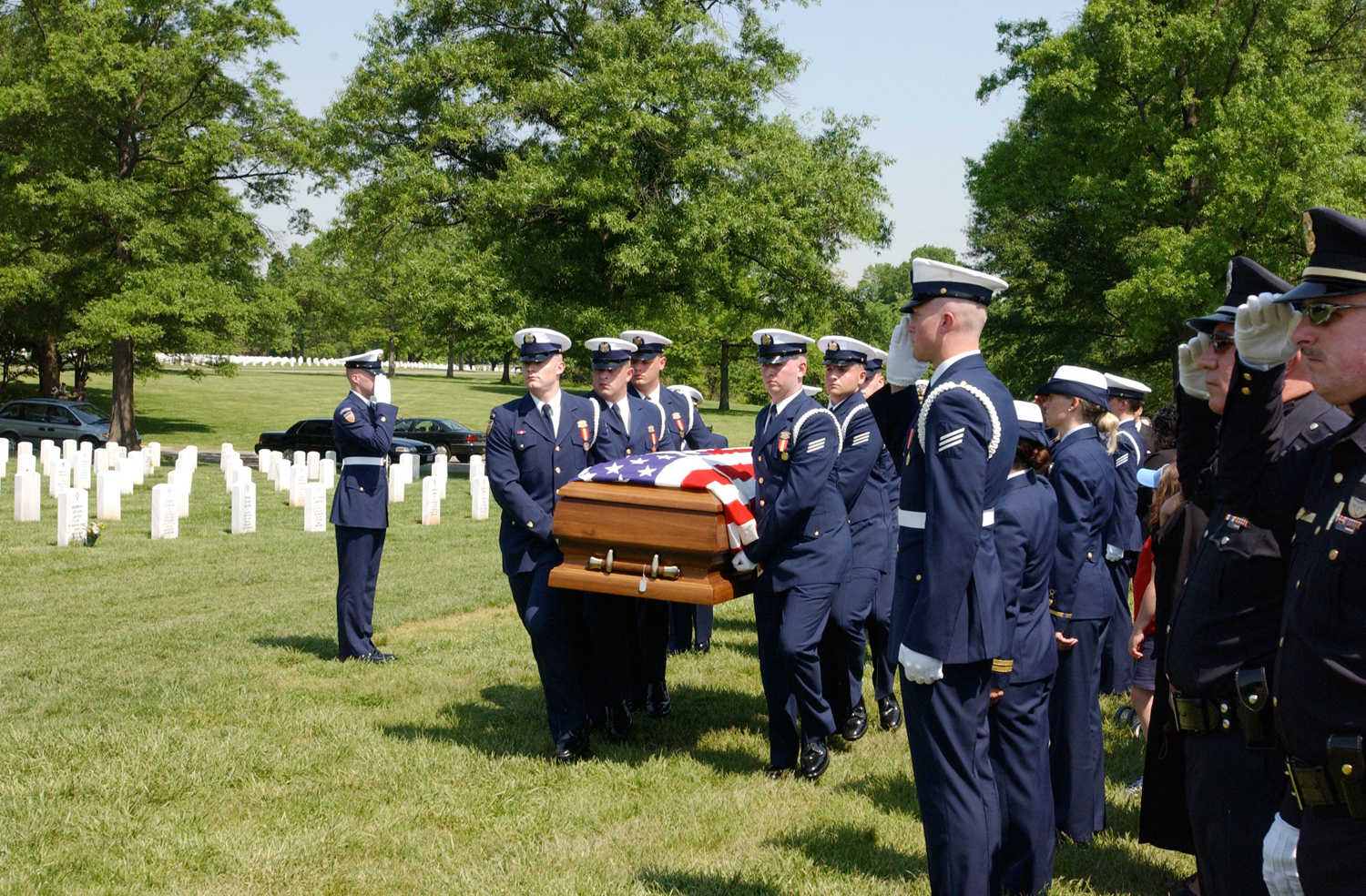
Bruckenthal was the first Coast Guardsman to lose their life in battle since Vietnam War during Operation Iraqi Freedom.

- Petty officer third class Nathan Bruckenthal was posthumously awarded the Bronze Star Medal with Combat Distinguishing Device and the Purple Heart. He died in the Iraq War in support of the war on terror.

== See also ==
- Special Missions Training Center
- Patrol Forces Southwest Asia
- Maritime Force Protection Unit
- Helicopter Interdiction Tactical Squadron
- Naval Expeditionary Combat Command
- U.S. Border Patrol Special Operations Group
