= 2025–2026 United States oil blockade of Venezuela =

- Part of Operation Southern Spear and US military buildup in the Caribbean
- A video of U.S. Coast Guard Maritime Security Response Team personnel seizing the Skipper published by United States attorney general Pam Bondi on X
- Type: Ship seizure
- Location: Caribbean Sea off the coast of Venezuela
- Planned by: United States
- Target: Sanctioned oil tankers trading in and out of Venezuela
- Date: December 10, 2025 − present (9 months, 1 week and 5 days)
- Executed by: United States Department of Homeland Security; United States Coast Guard; Maritime Security Response Team (MSRT); United States Navy; United States Marines; 22nd Marine Expeditionary Unit (SOC); United States Army; 1st SFOD-D; 160th SOAR(A); Supported by: United Kingdom (Note: Marinera (Bella 1) seizure.); Royal Navy; Royal Air Force
- Outcome: 10 oil tankers intercepted by the United States
- Casualties: None

As part of Operation Southern Spear, the United States enacted a blockade on sanctioned oil tankers traveling in and out of Venezuela on 17 December 2025, after placing additional sanctions affecting oil trade with the country. A week before announcing the blockade, the US seized the oil tanker Skipper in the Caribbean Sea off the coast of Venezuela on 10 December, and then focused its military efforts on intercepting and pursuing other tankers trading with Venezuela. On 7 January 2026, the United States boarded and seized the Russian oil tanker Marinera (formerly Bella 1) in the Atlantic near Iceland and the Panama-flagged M Sophia in the Caribbean Sea.

Skipper had been sanctioned by the United States Department of the Treasury in 2022 for alleged involvement in an oil trafficking shadow fleet of vessels involving the Islamic Revolutionary Guard Corps and Hezbollah. Marinera and Sophia had also been sanctioned by the Treasury Department.

The Venezuelan government condemned the seizure of Skipper, describing it as an "act of international piracy". UN Security Council members urged restraint and some UN representatives condemned the naval blockade, and analysts said US actions tested maritime law.

== Background ==
On 7 August 2025, the United States Department of Justice raised a reward for the arrest of Venezuelan president Nicolás Maduro to US$50 million; Maduro was indicted by a US federal court in 2020 and is accused of narcoterrorism and conspiracy to import cocaine to the United States. The Trump administration accuses the Maduro government of flooding the US with drugs, and has pressured Maduro to step down. Over the following months, the United States Navy conducted its largest naval deployment in the Caribbean Sea since the Cuban Missile Crisis in 1962. As a part of the naval deployment, the US began launching air strikes on alleged drug trafficking vessels in the Caribbean Sea in September. By 10 December, the United States had carried out 22 air strikes that killed at least 87 people.

The Venezuelan economy is heavily reliant on oil exports. Venezuelan oil is extracted and exported by Petroleos de Venezuela (PDVSA), the state-owned oil company. Oil production has significantly decreased since the early 2000s due to corruption, PDVSA mismanagement, and sanctions implemented on the country by the United States. In March 2025, United States president Donald Trump signed Executive Order 14245 that placed a 25% tariff on any country that imported Venezuelan oil due to Venezuela being "very hostile". In August, Venezuelan defense minister Vladimir Padrino López announced that the Bolivarian Navy of Venezuela would be deployed to protect Venezuela's main oil hub. Maduro said in October 2025 that the US wanted to seize Venezuela's oil and that the Bolivarian Army of Venezuela had been mobilized to repel a land invasion.

The Russian tanker Seahorse, sanctioned by the European Union and the UK, attempting to deliver naphtha (a product necessary to help export Venezuela's heavy crude) to Venezuela was forced several times by USS Stockdale to turn back towards Cuba, although it eventually reached Venezuela in November 2025.

== Interdiction activity ==
=== Skipper (Adisa) ===
Skipper, previously named Adisa (IMO number 9304667), is owned by Triton Navigation Corp., based in the Marshall Islands and operated by Nigeria-based Thomarose Global Ventures. At 310,309 DWT, it was built by Imabari Shipbuilding at Saijō, Ehime, Japan, in 2005 as yard number 2507, named Toyo and managed by the Japanese NYK Line. The supertanker is a Very Large Crude Carrier (VLCC), making it too large for some ports.

In November 2022, the United States Department of the Treasury placed sanctions against Adisa, for allegedly being involved in an oil smuggling network that financed both the Islamic Revolutionary Guard Corps and Hezbollah. The network was led by a Ukrainian citizen living in Switzerland, Viktor Sergiyovitch Artemov, who was sanctioned by Office of Foreign Assets Control. Artemov was a Russian oil magnate and was accused by the US of coordinating a global Iranian "oil smuggling network" with the help of Triton Navigation.

According to a New York Times analysis of satellite imagery and data from TankerTrackers.com, Skipper issued false transponder readings from October to December 2025 that falsified the ship's location. TankerTrackers.com co-founder Samir Madani referred to Skipper as being part of a "global dark fleet" of tankers that falsify their location information. Moments before the seizure, the tanker was flying the Guyanese flag, despite not being registered in that country. Reportedly, Skipper docked at least twice in Iran since July 2025, and in Hong Kong in August 2025.

==== Seizure ====
On 10 December, ten Maritime Security Response Team personnel from the United States Coast Guard (USCG) and ten special operations personnel from the United States Marine Corps (USMC) aboard two helicopters launched from USS Gerald R. Ford boarded and took control of Skipper shortly after it left a Venezuelan port.

Skipper had left Puerto José in Venezuela on 4 December with about 1.8 million barrels of crude oil from PDVSA. Soon after its departure, near Curaçao, the tanker offloaded a portion of its oil to another ship, Neptune 6, which was en route to Cuba. Skipper then turned east, headed towards Asia. The oil tanker was in international waters between Grenada and Trinidad when it was boarded by US forces.

According to US attorney general Pam Bondi and anonymous US officials, Skipper was seized in accordance with a seizure warrant issued two weeks earlier by a federal judge for allegedly transporting "sanctioned oil". The ship was seized on the day the warrant was set to expire. Anonymous US officials stated to The New York Times that the sealed warrant was issued "because of the ship's past activities smuggling Iranian oil, not because of links to the Maduro government", while Bondi stated it had transported both Venezuelan and Iranian crude.

Bondi posted a short video excerpt of the seizure on X, adding that it was "conducted safely and securely" and was part of an investigation "to prevent the transport of sanctioned oil". According to The New York Times, three anonymous United States government officials said Skipper's crew did not resist, there were no casualties, and they expected that more seizures would occur in the following weeks as "part of the administration's efforts to weaken Mr. Maduro's government by undermining its oil market".

The US planned additional seizures of vessels transporting Venezuelan crude.

=== Centuries ===
On 20 December, the USCG boarded a second ship, the Panama-flagged Centuries (IMO number 9206310), carrying 1.8 million barrels of crude oil off the coast of Venezuela, reported as "intercepted" by Reuters. According to The Washington Post, neither the vessel nor its owner are sanctioned entities, and an unnamed source said the boarding was based on a history of the vessel transporting oil to China, and a "right to visit" law that "allows a warship to board and inspect a vessel it suspects is engaging in illicit activity". Permission to board was obtained from Panama, which later stated that the vessel had violated Panamanian maritime law by turning off its transponder while sailing with crude. Centuries had a history of faking its location. As of 22 December, it was not clear if the vessel would be released or when. In February, the ship was reported to be moored at the Galveston Offshore Lightering Area.

=== Marinera (Bella 1) ===
Munro shadowing the tanker Bella 1

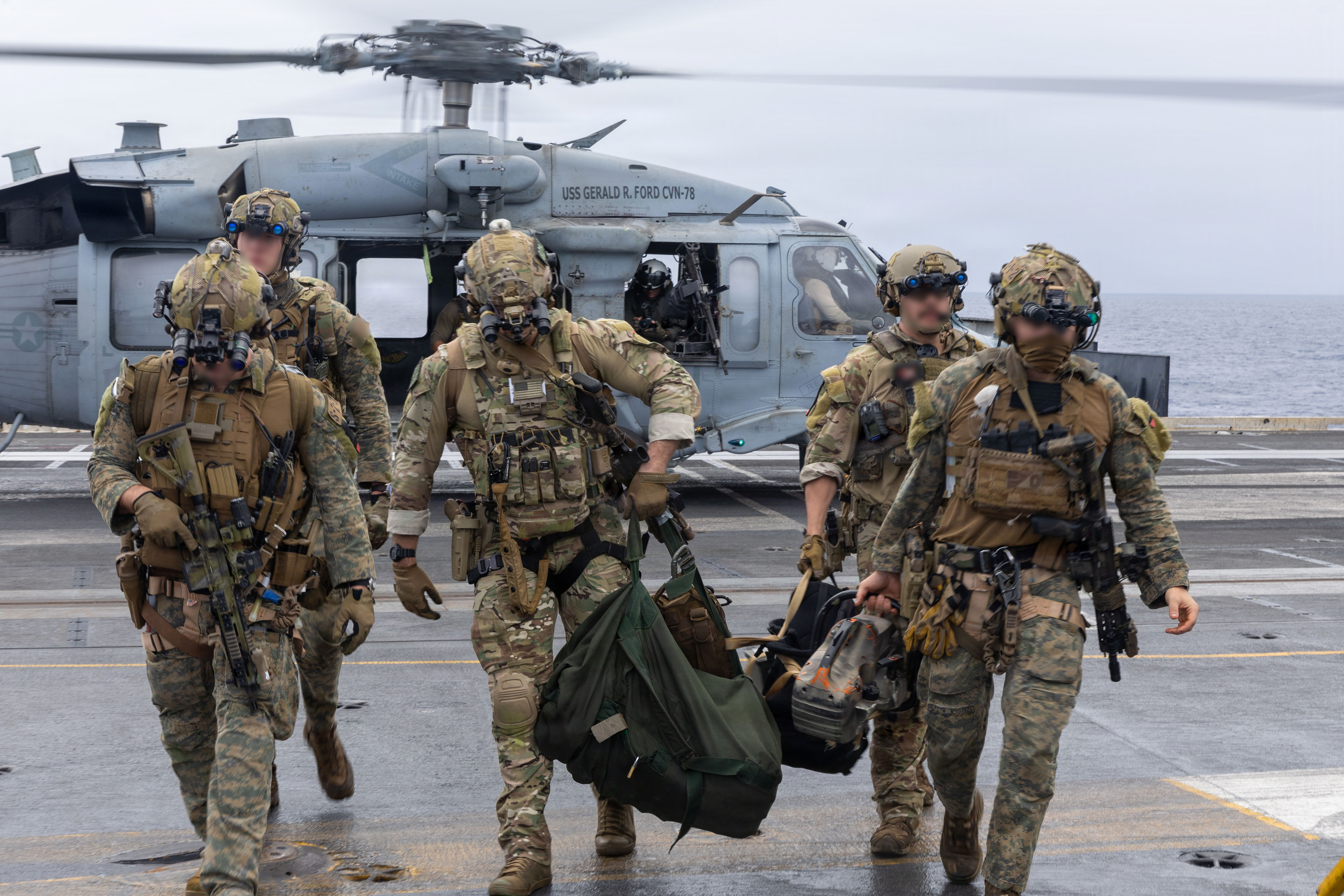
USCG and Marines, attached to HSC-9 aboard the USS Gerald R. Ford, following a right of visit operation in the Atlantic Ocean, 7 January 2026

The USCG had been pursuing a third VLCC, Bella 1 (IMO number: 9230880), since 20 December 2025, from the Caribbean through the Atlantic Ocean. The tanker had previously transported Iranian oil, and was en route to load Venezuelan oil purchased by a company associated with the recently-sanctioned Panamanian, Pedro Carretero. The vessel was sanctioned by the US for "allegedly carrying black-market Iranian oil on behalf of ... Hezbollah and the Houthis" and "has links to the Quds Force". The tanker is owned by Louis Marine Shipholding Enterprises, a Turkish company, sanctioned by the US Treasury in 2024. The US had a seizure warrant for Bella 1, which had a history of spoofing its location, was sailing without a valid flag, and did not submit to boarding.

Heading for Venezuela with no cargo, the ship's crew resisted boarding on 20 December and the vessel made a U-turn with the USCG in pursuit. The USCG requires a Maritime Special Response Team to intercept a hostile ship. Officials told The Wall Street Journal the team was in place, but because the tanker was old and not carrying oil, "there has been some debate within the Coast Guard and the Navy over whether the tanker should be captured".

A Russian flag was painted on the vessel reported on 31 December in what US officials said was "an apparent attempt to claim protection from Moscow" although "international law stipulates that ships aren't permitted to change their flags mid-voyage unless there is a change of ownership or registration". On that day, Russia sent a request through diplomatic channels to ask the United States to stop its pursuit of the tanker. By 1 January 2026, the vessel appeared on the Russian Maritime Register of Shipping under a new name, Marinera, complicating the seizure matter. On 6 January, it was reported that Marinera was being escorted by a Russian submarine and a navy vessel. On that day, the Russian Foreign Ministry announced it was monitoring the situation, with US officials confirming Russia had asked the US to stop the pursuit. The tanker appeared bound on a voyage towards a Russian port in the Arctic.

The United States European Command (EUCOM) announced on 7 January 2026, that Marinera had been seized by the USCG cutter Munro in the Atlantic Ocean waters between Iceland and Scotland, traveling northward and eastward; an unnamed US official told The Washington Post that the vessel was secure and the Russians had not interfered with the seizure. US military aircraft and special operation forces, including Navy SEALs, were reported to have been prepositioned in Scotland to board the vessel, which was boarded by helicopter. Boeing P-8 Poseidon, Lockheed AC-130J and Pilatus U-28A Draco aircraft assisted the helicopter boarding. The United Kingdom acted as a supporting force by contributing a number of Royal Air Force (RAF) surveillance aircraft to monitor and assist the seizure, while the replenishment vessel RFA Tideforce was provided to support US vessels. Icelandic media reported that the seizure happened in international waters within Iceland's exclusive economic zone, with the Icelandic Coast Guard monitoring the vessel but not intervening in the seizure.

Russia accused the US of "outright piracy" in violation of the United Nations Convention on the Law of the Sea, and demanded that Russian members of the crew be repatriated. The Russian Ministry of Transport stated that previously the vessel had received a temporary permit to sail under the Russian flag, in accordance with both Russian and "international" law. US Department of Homeland Security (DHS) Secretary Kristi Noem justified the interception by claiming that the Marinera was "responsible for transporting sanctioned oil from Venezuela and Iran". The US had previously cited the alleged statelessness of the vessel as justification for the seizure. Unnamed US officials indicated that the seizure was meant to deter other sanctioned tankers from changing their flag to the Russian flag to evade sanctions. Marinera was described by the British Secretary of State for Defence John Healey as being part of "shadow fleet activity", which he also called "a sanctioned, stateless vessel".

The crew was reported to consist of 17 Ukrainian, six Georgian, three Indian and two Russian citizens, with the captain being Georgian. (Note: Initial reporting suggested 20 Ukrainian, six Georgian, and two Russian citizens as part of the crew. Later reporting by Russian state media indicating that three Indian nationals were aboard, together with Ukrainian diplomatic sources reporting the number of Ukrainians to be 17, suggests that three Indian crew members had initially been mislabeled as Ukrainian.) Journalists from Current Time TV and Radio Free Europe/Radio Liberty reported that the tanker was linked to two Kremlin allies, Moldovan pro-Russian fugitive oligarch Ilan Shor and Ukrainian pro-Russian fugitive politician Viktor Baranskyi. The Russian Foreign Ministry called the potential legal prosecution of the crew by the US "categorically unacceptable". On 9 January, the Russian Foreign Ministry announced that the United States had decided to release the two Russian citizens aboard the vessel after appealing to Trump. Marinera was moored on 13 January in the Moray Firth, northeastern Scotland. While First Minister of Scotland John Swinney complained he had received no advance notice from the British government regarding the mooring, the British government said the ship had entered UK waters to replenish essential supplies, including food and water for the crew. On 16 January, the BBC reported that Marinera would be taken to the US to be "subject to a judicial forfeiture process" and that the individuals involved in its attempt to flee would be prosecuted by American authorities. The captain and first officer were reportedly transferred to the UCG cutter Munro and removed from Scottish jurisdiction despite a Scottish court order prohibiting their removal pending a full hearing. The United States had not confirmed whether it had planned to release the Russians by 20 January, leading Russian foreign minister Sergei Lavrov to call on his American colleagues to "fulfill their promises". With the exception of the captain and the first officer, the crew was released and disembarked on January 26, with the Russian sailors returning home soon after. The Security Service of Ukraine (SBU) reportedly opened an investigation about the Ukrainian sailors of the Marinera.

On 10 August 2026, the captain of Marinera was sentenced to a 10-month prison term by a United States district court after pleading guilty to one count of refusing to obey USCG orders.

=== M Sophia ===
On 7 January 2026, US Southern Command (USSOUTHCOM) announced that it had seized the oil tanker M Sophia (IMO number 9289477) in the Caribbean Sea. It described the vessel as a "stateless, sanctioned dark fleet motor tanker". M Sophia was flying a Panamanian flag and reportedly had its transponder off for approximately five months before being seized. Unnamed US officials indicated on 28 January that M Sophia would be returned to Venezuelan authorities.

=== Olina (Minerva M) ===
On 9 January, USSOUTHCOM announced that it had seized MV Olina (IMO number 9282479) in the Caribbean in a joint operation with the USCG. The oil tanker was reported to be flying the false flag of Timor-Leste and left Venezuela fully loaded with sanctioned oil. The seizure was carried out by sailors and marines from USS Gerald R. Ford. The Aframax tanker was previously named Minerva M and sanctioned by the US in 2021, and also by the UK and EU.

After Trump stated the vessel's departure from Venezuela was unauthorized, and Olina had been seized "in coordination with the interim authorities of Venezuela", PDVSA announced the tanker was being returned to Venezuela as part of a joint operation with the US. Trump said: "The oil will be sold through the GREAT Energy Deal, which we have created for such sales".

=== Veronica ===
On 15 January 2026, USSOUTHCOM announced it had seized Veronica (IMO number 9256860), a crude oil tanker, in the Caribbean. They said the ship was in defiance of Trump's "quarantine of sanctioned vessels". While the oil tanker was sailing under the flag of Guyana, the International Maritime Organization's database indicated it was previously registered in Russia under different names.

=== Sagitta ===
On 21 January, USSOUTHCOM announced it had seized a seventh tanker in the Caribbean, Sagitta (IMO number 9296822), "without incident". It indicated that the tanker was "operating in defiance of President Trump's established quarantine of sanctioned vessels in the Caribbean". Sagitta was owned and registered by a Hong Kong-based company and was sanctioned by the US Treasury in the wake of the 2022 Russian invasion of Ukraine. The vessel was sanctioned while flying the Panamanian flag, and was seized while reportedly flying the Liberian flag. At the time of capture, the ship was also in the sanctions lists of Australia, Canada, the European Union, New Zealand, Switzerland, Ukraine, and the United Kingdom.

=== Aquila II ===
On 9 February, United States Indo-Pacific Command (INDOPACOM) directed an overnight boarding and capture of the Suezmax tanker Aquila II (IMO number 9281152) in the Indian Ocean. The vessel had previously departed Venezuelans waters in January 2026, with approximately 700,000 barrels of crude oil headed for China. According to Defense Secretary Pete Hegseth this was against the "quarantine of sanctioned vessels in the Caribbean."

=== Summary of seizures of oil tankers ===
No.	Vessel	IMO number	Size	Date	Location	Oil cargo (mil. bbl)	Sanctions	Notes and sources
1	Skipper (Adisa)	9304667	VLCC	2025-12-10	International waters between Grenada and Trinidad	1.85	United States	
2	Centuries	9206310	VLCC	2025-12-20	Near Venezuela	1.83	—	Apprehended as a "False flag ship"
3	Marinera (Bella 1)	9230880	VLCC	2026-01-07	Atlantic Ocean, between Iceland and Scotland	0	United States	
4	M Sophia	9289477	VLCC	2026-01-07	Caribbean Sea	1.8	United States; United Kingdom	False identity as Varada Blessing
5	Olina (Minerva M)	9282479	Aframax	2026-01-09	Caribbean Sea	0.7	United States; United Kingdom; European Union	Returned to Venezuela in a joint operation
6	Veronica	9256860	Aframax	2026-01-15	Caribbean Sea	0	United States	
7	Sagitta	9296822	Aframax	2026-01-20	Caribbean Sea		United States; United Kingdom; European Union; Switzerland; New Zealand; Australia	
8	Aquila II	9281152	Suezmax	2026-02-09	Indian Ocean	0.7	United States	
9	VERONICA III	9326055	VLCC	2026-02-14	Indian Ocean	1.9	United States	
10	Bertha			2026-02-24	Indian Ocean		United States	

== Additional sanctions and naval quarantine ==
The day after the Skipper seizure, additional sanctions targeting Maduro's family and oil shipments were imposed by the US, intent on placing financial pressure on Maduro via "maximum" enforcement of sanctions. Mike Waltz, the US ambassador to the United Nations, stated in a December meeting of the UN Security Council that the sanctioned vessels provide the "primary economic lifeline" that furthers Maduro's "ability to sell Venezuela's oil", enabling "his fraudulent claim to power and his narco-terrorist activities".

Among those sanctioned were six companies and six vessels that had recently transported Venezuelan crude, and Ramón Carretero Napolitano, a Panamanian who allegedly had business ties to Maduro's family involving oil.

On 17 December, Trump announced a "blockade" targeting sanctioned oil tankers trading in and out of Venezuela. Because the action is limited to sanctioned oil tankers, it is better described as a quarantine; a blockade is an act of war, while enforcing sanctions is a legal matter. One week later, US officials said Trump had ordered the "military to focus 'almost exclusively' on interdicting Venezuelan oil", without specifying what that exclusive focus meant.

After the capture of Nicolás Maduro by US Forces on 3 January 2026, at least 16 tankers fled Venezuelan ports as of 5 January in an attempt to evade the US quarantine by heading in different directions at the same time. They tried to avoid detection by transmitting false names and position data or turning off their AIS transmitters; 15 were under previous sanctions. A New York Times article cited sources who stated the ships did not act upon orders of acting president Delcy Rodríguez, but were controlled by sanctioned businesses and individuals close to Maduro. Oil industry sources stated that the tankers were "contracted by the oil traders Alex Saab and Ramón Carretero" and that by coordinating their departure, the vessels could overwhelm the quarantine; Carretero was sanctioned by the US in December 2025.

== Impact ==
The interdictions have led to a sharp decline in crude exports, as fears of seizure have caused several tankers, some of which are sanctioned, to remain in Venezuelan waters. Several oil tankers en route to Venezuela also made U-turns or halted their navigation following the interdictions. As of 24 December, only two oil tankers carrying PDVSA crude have attempted to enter international waters; one of these, Centuries, was also intercepted. More than 30 ships in Venezuela that are sanctioned by the United States could also be seized, according to Reuters.

As excess crude accumulated, PDVSA began to drain onshore oil storage to oil tankers in order to avoid cutting production. On 28 December PDVSA began to shut down wells in the Orinoco Belt, an action seen as a last resort due to the high costs and logistical challenges associated with restarting them.

Only oil tankers linked to Chevron Corporation could freely travel through international waters with Venezuelan crude. (Note: Chevron is licensed by the US Government to carry crude oil to US ports, exempt from sanctions, through its joint ventures with PDVSA.) Chevron spokesperson Bill Turenne reported that its operations in Venezuela continued without disruption.

Morningstar DBRS stated in January 2026 that heightened geopolitical tensions and enforcement actions linked to Venezuela have elevated risks for the global property and casualty insurance sector, particularly in specialty lines such as marine and aviation insurance with exposure to Caribbean shipping lanes and airspace coverage. While "direct exposure to Venezuela appears limited for most international insurers, regional spillovers matter because of increased geopolitical tail risks".

== Analysis ==
The BBC characterized the seizure and additional sanctions as a "sharp escalation in the US pressure campaign against Maduro". The Wall Street Journal described a "paralyzed tanker traffic" to Venezuelan ports—also documented by Reuters—as "an existential crisis for a regime that runs on oil revenue" that "creates an escalating series of crises" that experts said could be destabilizing.

China buys most of Venezuela's oil at discounted prices. US actions could aggravate tensions between the US and China over control of the Panama Canal.

Representatives of the Office of the United Nations High Commissioner for Human Rights (OHCHR) condemned the sanctions and quarantine, saying the US is "violating fundamental rules of international law". Other analysts say the US has never ratified the United Nations Convention on the Law of the Sea (UNCLOS), but its novel actions in the Venezuela case will test established maritime practices and may encourage other countries to seize vessels in international waters.

International law scholars have broadly agreed that the boarding of Skipper was made in accordance to UNCLOS due to the ship flying a Guyanese flag despite not being registered there, thus making it stateless. However, several highlighted that the extent of the boarding party's jurisdiction over the vessel, people and cargo is not settled, because while some states adhere to the view that a boarding party has total jurisdiction over a boarded stateless vessel, others adhere to a more limited jurisdiction interpretation.

== Reactions ==
=== United States ===
When Trump confirmed the seizure of Skipper, he stated that "we've just seized a tanker on the coast of Venezuela—a large tanker, very large, the largest one ever seized actually" and that it was "seized for a very good reason". When Trump was asked what the United States would do with Skipper, he responded "we keep it, I guess". Trump administration officials like Kristi Noem and Karoline Leavitt connected the oil tanker's seizure to the administration's war on drugs in Latin America.

Pete Hegseth, the United States Secretary of Defense, wrote that – as part of Operation Southern Spear – the US would "unflinchingly conduct maritime interdiction operations ... to dismantle illicit criminal networks. Violence, drugs, and chaos will not control the Western Hemisphere."

From the Republican Party, Senator Roger Marshall told reporters that the United States "should be pushing back on Venezuela", adding that he was "concerned about the drug cartel that is running" Venezuela, referring to Cartel of the Suns. Senator Rand Paul told NewsNation reporter Hannah Brandt that the seizure "sounds a lot like the beginning of a war". Representative Rick Crawford told NewsNation's Elizabeth Vargas that the seizure was part of an "ongoing action" against Maduro's government, adding that it was "a pretty strong signal to Maduro".

From the Democratic Party, Senator Chris Coons also told NewsNation that he was "gravely concerned that [Trump] is sleepwalking [the United States] into a war with Venezuela". Senator Chris Van Hollen stated that seizure of Skipper demonstrated that the Trump administration wanted "regime change [in Venezuela]—by force".

=== Venezuela ===
The Venezuelan government "strongly denounced and repudiated" what it considered to be "a shameless robbery and an act of international piracy"; according to Reuters, "legal specialists said it did not fall under such a definition under international law". Maduro's government stated that it would "defend its sovereignty, natural resources, and national dignity with absolute determination". It accused Trinidad and Tobago of participating in the ship's seizure, without saying how they had participated, and canceled all natural gas agreements between the two countries.

Following the announcement of the naval quarantine, Venezuela's National Assembly, controlled by Maduro's party, introduced and passed in two days a bill to criminalize the support, financing or participation in "acts of piracy, blockades or other international illegal acts"; the Associated Press stated that opposition leader María Corina Machado has supported the vessel seizures.

Venezuelan navy vessels began to escort oil tankers carrying Venezuelan petroleum products, though have been limited to unsanctioned tankers and have been contained to the country's territorial waters.

=== Other ===
The government of Guyana stated that Skipper was falsely flying the flag of Guyana as it was not registered in the country. Cuba's foreign ministry called the oil tanker's seizure an "act of piracy and maritime terrorism," aimed at obstructing Venezuela's right to free trade.

China condemned the United States for seizing oil tankers in December 2025, stating the action was in violation of international law. In a subsequent diplomatic call between Beijing and Caracas, the two countries' top diplomats reaffirmed China's opposition to unilateralism and bullying.

Iranian Foreign Ministry spokesperson, Esmail Baghaei, condemned the US seizure of the oil tanker as "an act of piracy" that he said had no legal basis under international law and that all countries should condemn.

Russia's foreign ministry expressed support for Maduro's government and called the US action "lawlessness in the Caribbean Sea, where long-forgotten theft of other people's property, namely piracy, and banditry, are being revived".

At a special meeting of the UN Security Council in December 2025, other countries supported concerns over maritime law and member sovereignty; Panama and Argentina were among the countries supporting the US.

== See also ==
- 2026 United States naval blockade of Iran
- MV Morning Glory, an oil tanker seized by the United States in 2014 off the coast of Sidra, Libya
- Crisis in Venezuela
- Venezuelan shadow fleet

== External sources ==
- List of officially sanctioned tankers (latest)
- List of officially sanctioned tankers (at 31 December 2025)
