= MV Younara Glory =

Crude oil tanker built in 2004

History
- Name: Younara Glory
- Operator: DHT Management
- Launched: 31 August 2004
- Identification: IMO number: 9289477
- Status: in active service

General characteristics
- Class & type: Oil tanker
- Tonnage: 320,051 DWT; 161,235 GT
- Length: 333.02 m (1,092 ft 7 in)
- Beam: 60.04 m (197 ft 0 in)
- Draft: 22.47 m (73 ft 9 in)
- Propulsion: MAN B&W 6S90MC-C diesel engine; 39,500 hp (29,500 kW) at 76 rpm.
- Speed: 16.5 knots (30.6 km/h; 19.0 mph) (maximum)
- Capacity: 340,584 m^{3} (2,142,210 bbl) (at 98%)

The oil tanker MV Younara Glory is one of the world's longest ships. She was built in 2004 at the Daewoo Shipbuilding & Marine Engineering as Delos. She was later renamed DHT Condor, Younara Glory and then M Sophia in 2021. She is a crude carrier with tonnages of 320,051 tons deadweight (DWT) and 161,235 gross tonnage (GT). The overall length of the ship is 333.00 metres (1,092 ft 6 in), the extreme beam is 60.00 metres (196 ft 10 in) and the draught is 22.47 metres (73 ft 9 in). The cargo ship has total tank capacity for 340,584 cubic metres (2,142,210 bbl) at 98%.

== Engineering ==
The main engine of the ship is MAN B&W 6S90MC-C with output power of 39,500 horsepower (29,500 kW), achieved at 76 rpm. The output power together with the improved propulsion system and high-effective propeller, allow the cargo ship to operate with service speed of 15 knots (28 km/h; 17 mph). The maximum achieved speed during the trial tests was over 16.5 knots (30.6 km/h; 19.0 mph).

== 2026 Seizure ==
On 7 January 2026, the U.S. Southern Command announced they had seized the ship as part of Operation Southern Spear. They described the ship as a "stateless, sanctioned dark fleet motor".
