= Executive Order 14245 =

2025 U.S. executive order imposing tariffs on Venezuelan oil

- Imposing Tariffs on Countries Importing Venezuelan Oil
- Front page of Executive Order 14245
- Type: Executive order
- Number: 14245
- President: Donald Trump
- Signed: March 24, 2025

Federal Register details
- Federal Register document number: 2025-05440
- Publication date: March 27, 2025

Summary
- 25% tariff on all goods imported into the United States from any country that imports Venezuelan oil

Executive Order 14245, titled Imposing Tariffs on Countries Importing Venezuelan Oil, is an executive order signed by Donald Trump on March 24, 2025. It imposes a tariff of 25 percent on all goods imported into the United States from any country that imports Venezuelan oil.

It is the one of many tariffs signed by Donald Trump during his second presidential term.

== Provisions ==
Under the order the Secretary of State may impose a 25% tariff on goods from any country that imports Venezuelan oil, directly or indirectly, on or after April 2, 2025.

Additionally under section 3 of the order, the Secretary of the Treasury, the Secretary of Commerce, the Secretary of Homeland Security and the United States Trade Representative are authorized to take a number of different steps and actions to enforce the order. They include determining whether a country has imported Venezuelan oil directly or indirectly, issuing regulations, guidance, and determinations as necessary to implement the order, coordinating with heads of other executive departments and agencies to ensure compliance and taking actions consistent with applicable law to carry out the order.

== Background ==
On March 24, 2025, President Donald Trump announced that he would be placing a 25% tariff on all imports from any country that buys oil or gas from Venezuela, as well as imposing new tariffs on the country itself, which would take effect on April 2.

In a post made to Truth Social, in which he made the announcement, he claimed as one of the reasons for the tariffs "...that Venezuela had purposefully and deceitfully sent to the United States, tens of thousands of high level, and other, criminals, many of whom are murderers and people of a very violent nature." including members of the Tren de Aragua gang, who Trump had classified as a foreign terrorist organization.

The Venezuelan Foreign Ministry responded to the tariffs, saying in a statement that they rejected the tariffs and called them "arbitrary, illegal, and desperate." The President of Venezuela Nicolás Maduro also responded, stating “Imperial announcements only motivate us to work harder.”

Later that same day Trump signed Executive Order 14245 to enact the announced tariffs.
