= Visit, board, search, and seizure =

United States military term

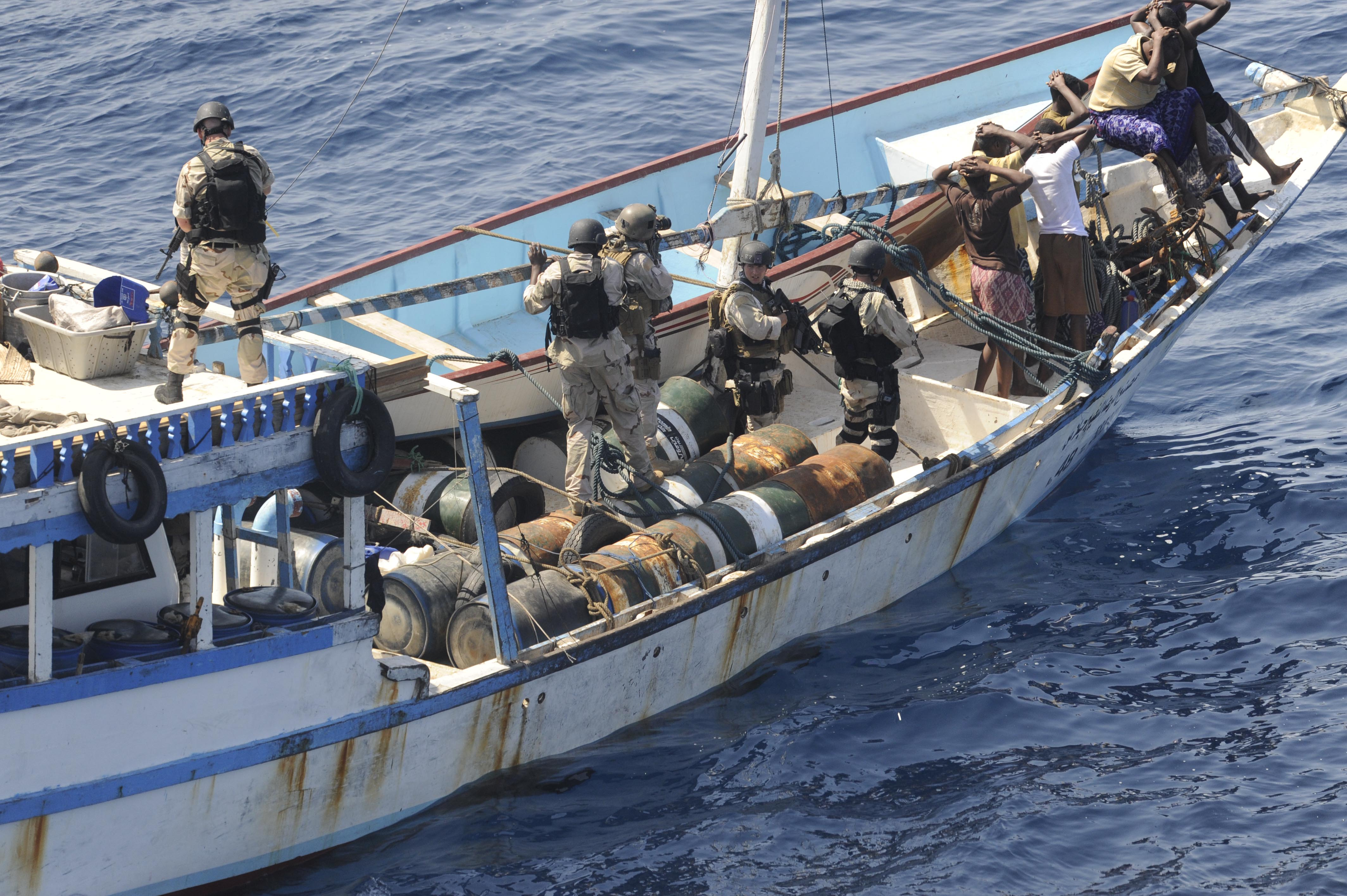
A combined U.S. Navy/U.S. Coast Guard VBSS team from USS Chosin (CG-65) and embarked MSST personnel inspects a suspected pirate dhow in the Gulf of Aden, November 2009.

Visit, board, search, and seizure (VBSS) is the term used by United States military and law enforcement agencies for maritime boarding actions and tactics. VBSS teams are designed to capture enemy vessels, combat terrorism, piracy, and smuggling, and to conduct customs, safety and other inspections.

== United States Navy training ==
The initial training continuum includes three courses, lasting a total of eight weeks (SRF-B, SRF-A, VBSS), with some team members receiving additional follow-on training. Skills taught in VBSS training revolve around Close Quarters Battle (CQB). Training consists of proficiency in hand-to-hand combat tactics, search procedures, tactical team movements, shooting, rappelling, searching, and arrest procedures for compliant and non-compliant combatants. This aspect of the Navy plays a role in maintaining security and freedom of sea lanes worldwide. Some advanced units, known as Helicopter Visit, Board, Search, and Seizure (HVBSS) teams, have been trained to fast rope aboard vessels from helicopters.

All sailors in the U.S. Navy are eligible to serve aboard a VBSS team, but those who aspire to join a team have to be approved by their ship's command. Being approved does not guarantee inclusion on a VBSS team, as it is possible (and not uncommon) for candidates to wash out of VBSS school. The attrition rate for VBSS is 25-30%, on average.

U.S. Navy VBSS teams are generally armed with M4 carbines, Mossberg 500 shotguns, and Beretta M9 pistols. The body armor is generally with kevlar ballistic plate inserts and a buoyant tactical vest that doubles as a life preserver. The majority of U.S. naval ships deploying with VBSS teams are smaller, such as destroyers, cruisers, etc. VBSS teams are used to combat illegal narcotics, arms trafficking, and piracy.

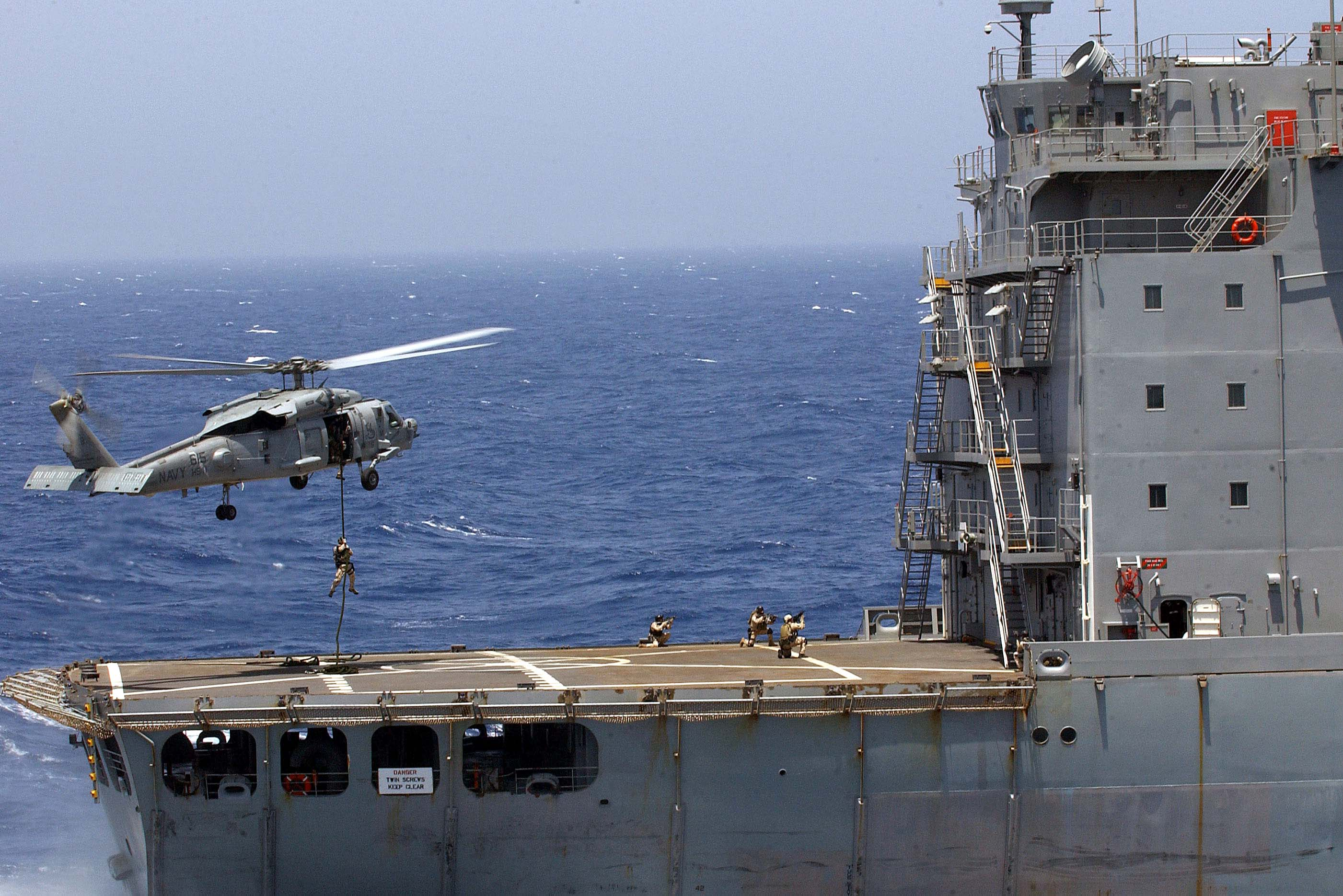
US Navy SEALs demonstrate VBSS techniques for the 2004 Joint Civilian Orientation Conference.

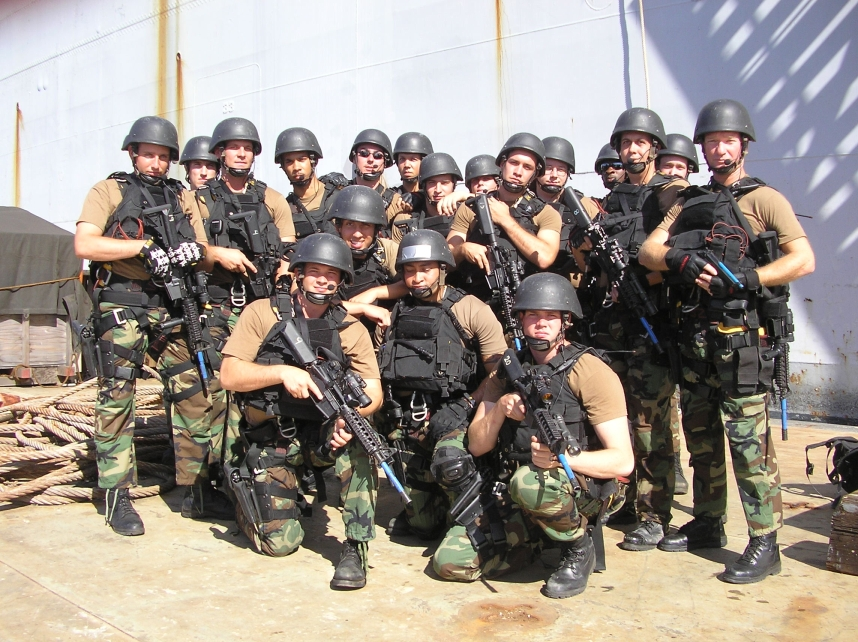
US Navy VBSS Team assigned to the USS Gary (FFG-51) training at Naval Station Pearl Harbor.

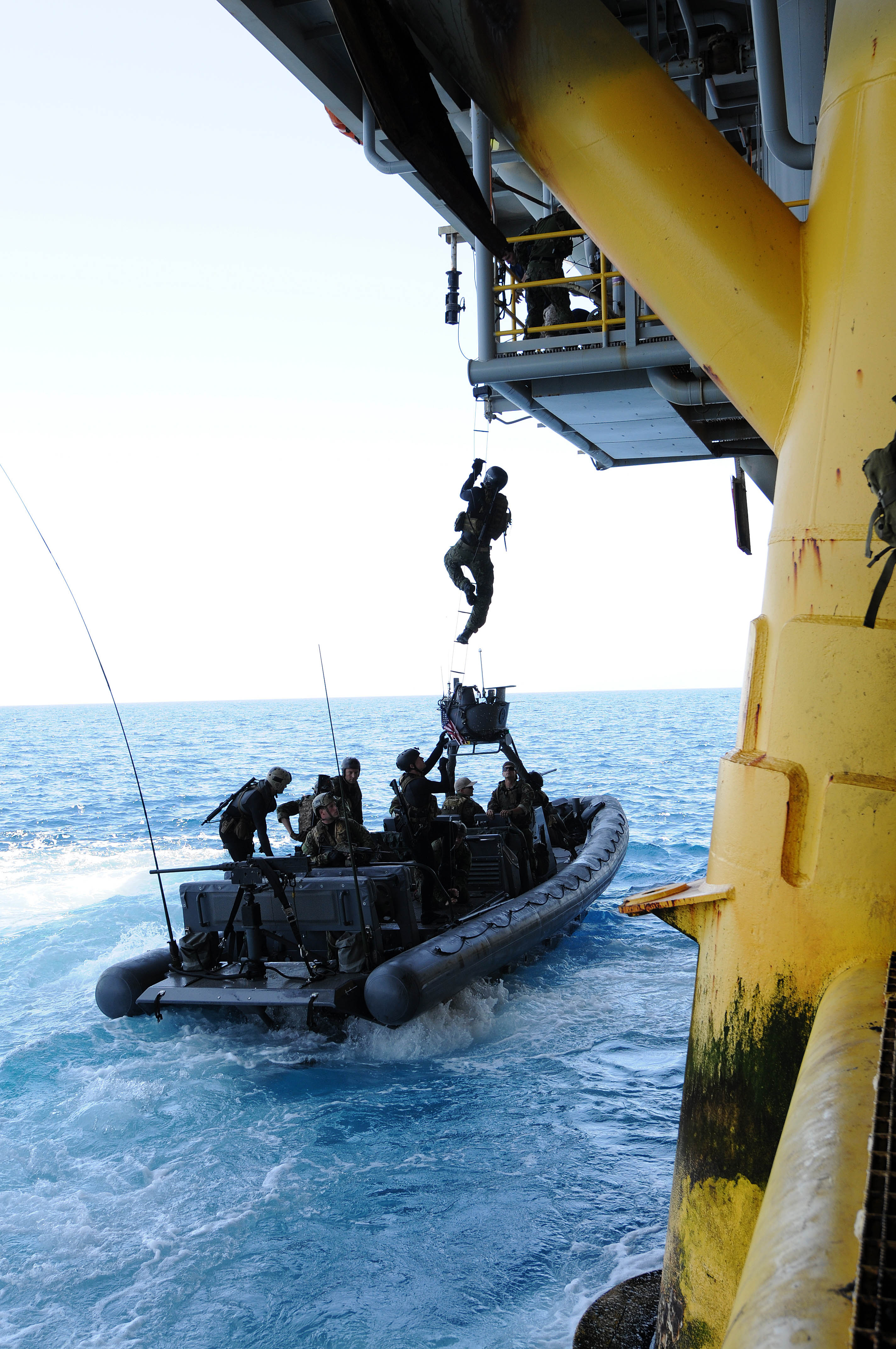
U.S. Navy SEALs train with Special Boat Team 12 on the proper techniques of how to board gas and oil platforms from a moving vessel near Long Beach, Calif., on July 28, 2011.

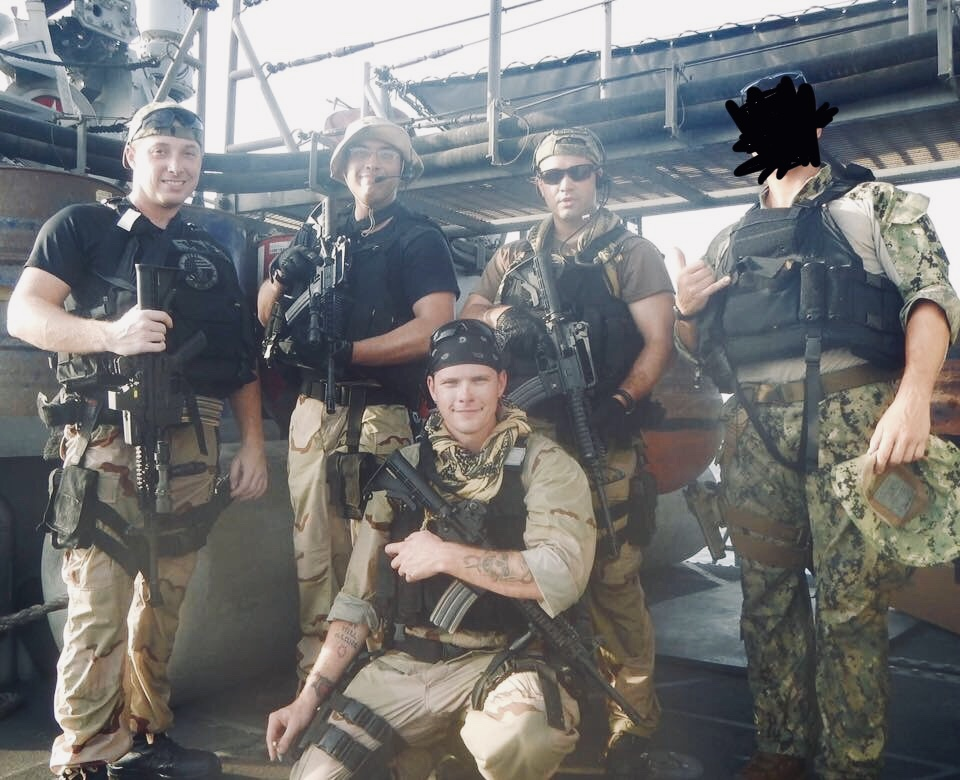
VBSS Team attached to USS Whirlwind (PC-11).

== United States Marine Corps ==
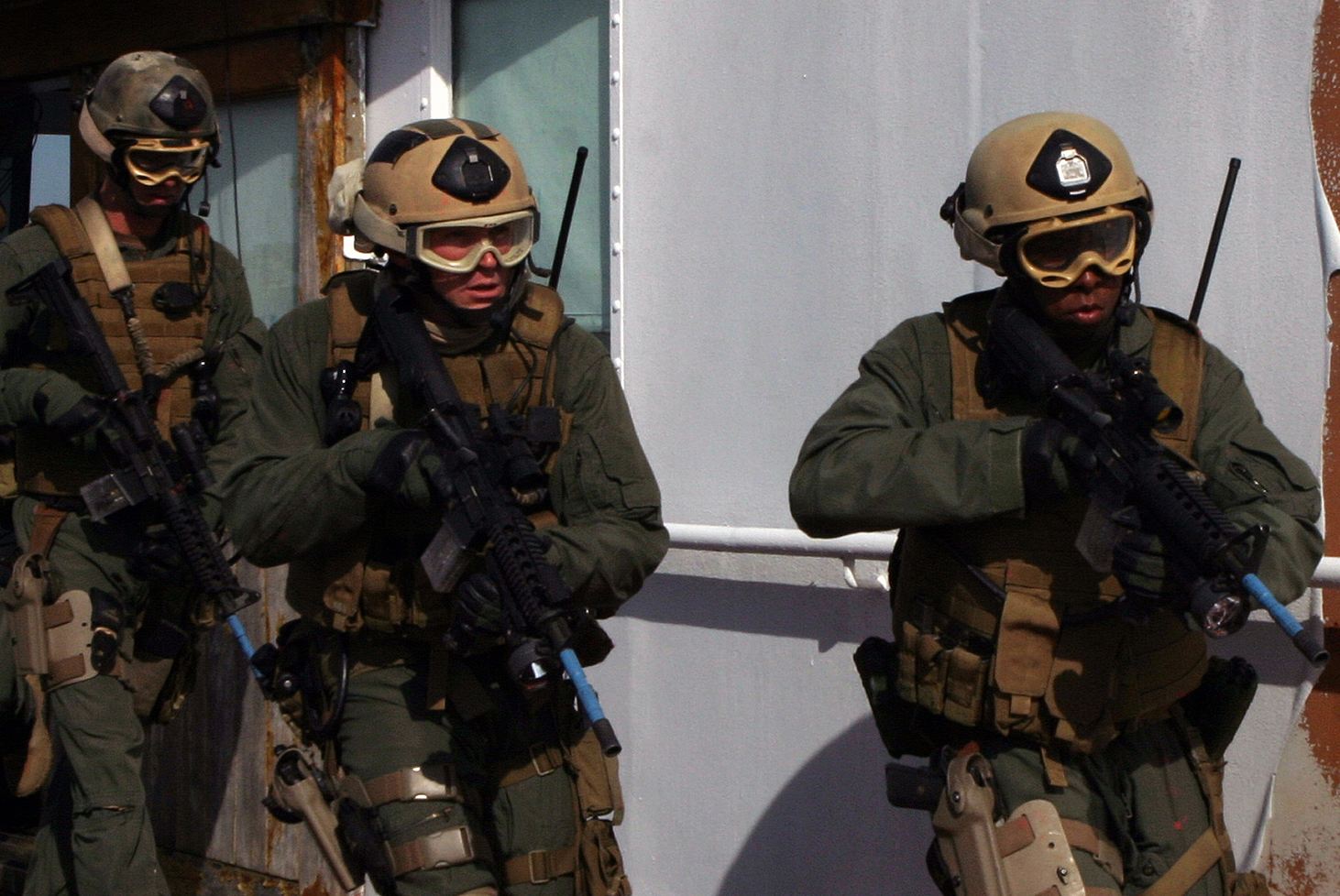
Marines from the 24th Marine Expeditionary Unit conduct VBSS training

The United States Marine Corps has several units that conduct VBSS. The premier VBSS force is the ARG/MEU's Maritime Raid Force (MRF), previously known as the Maritime Special Purpose Force. Additionally the various Fleet Antiterrorism Security Teams are trained to varying levels of proficiency in VBSS.

=== MRF ===
The MRF is a sub-unit of the ARG/MEU that is task-organized for each specific mission. However, it typically consists of three platoons: a Force Reconnaissance Platoon as the assault element, an Amphibious Reconnaissance Platoon as the support element, and a Battalion Landing Team infantry platoon as the security element. Together these form the backbone of the MRF and are usually augmented by explosive ordnance disposal technicians, counter-intelligence/human intelligence, joint terminal attack controllers, military information support operators, United States Coast Guard Law Enforcement Detachments, and chemical, biological, radiological, and nuclear (CBRN) specialists, among others as needed.

The backbone platoons and enablers are then married with the needed support assets for a particular mission, such as USN and USMC aircraft and small boats. Integral to the ARG/MEU construct, and bringing to bear the full range of ARG/MEU capabilities, the MRF is a conventional force that is capable of many 'SOF-like' missions, including opposed VBSS.

== United States Coast Guard ==
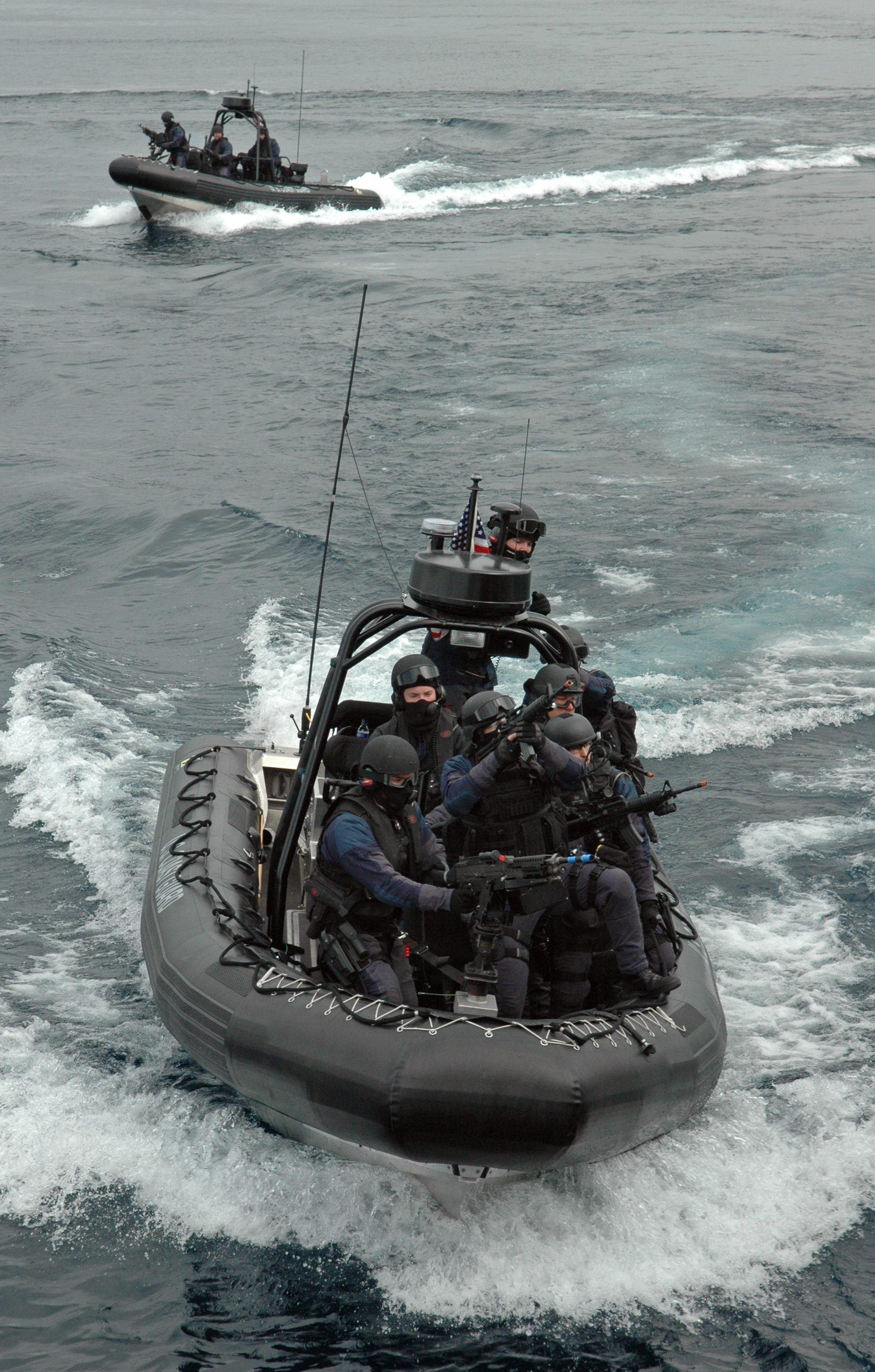
MSST Over the Horizon Boat

The U.S. Coast Guard is another service that commonly conducts VBSS. The USCG belongs to the Department of Homeland Security, and not the Department of Defense, and therefore their VBSS teams act in a law enforcement capacity where the US may exercise its jurisdiction. Law enforcement boarding teams from cutters and stations are generally armed with SIG P229 pistols, Remington M870P shotguns, and rifles of the M16 rifle family, (commonly a Mk 18 or M4 carbine). Additionally, the Coast Guard has a number of specialized units, including the Maritime Security Response Teams, and Tactical Law Enforcement Teams, that have advanced boarding capabilities.

In addition to law enforcement, the USCG will often use VBSS to conduct at-sea safety inspections of civilian vessels to ensure they are abiding by applicable safety regulations and U.S. law.

== See also ==
- Maritime Interdiction Operations (MIO)
- Maritime Security Operations (MSO)
- Military operations other than war (MOOTW)
- MV Magellan Star (Opposed VBSS by 15th MEU MRF)
