= Counterproliferation =

Efforts to stop weapon proliferation

Counterproliferation refers to diplomatic, intelligence, and military efforts to combat the proliferation of weapons, including weapons of mass destruction such as chemical or nuclear weapons, long-range missiles, and certain conventional weapons. Measures to combat proliferation by analysing and preventing related financial transactions are referred to as counter-proliferation financing. Nonproliferation and arms control are related terms. In contrast to nonproliferation, which focuses on diplomatic, legal, and administrative measures to dissuade and impede the acquisition of such weapons, counterproliferation focuses on intelligence, law enforcement, and sometimes military action to prevent their acquisition.

== Weapons delivery ==
=== Missile technology ===
Long-range missile technology is of greatest threat when the missiles carry weapons of mass destruction, but long-range weapons with precision guidance can be serious threats with explosive or other conventional warheads. This has been supplemented by the International Code of Conduct against Ballistic Missile Proliferation (ICOC), also known as the Hague Code of Conduct.

Technical means of verification, including space-based sensors that can scan large parts of the world, can provide early warning of long-range missile development. Space-based Staring Infrared Sensors can detect the heat of rocket launching motors. Various radars can monitor range and other characteristics, but they need to be in a place where they have line-of-sight to the missile trajectory. The United States, probably Russia, and possibly other nations have aircraft-based and ship-based sensors that can monitor such tests, but there has to be warning of potential tests so these sensors can be deployed.
