= Maritime Law Enforcement Specialist =

United States Coast Guard agent

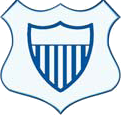
- Rating insignia
- Issued by: United States Coast Guard
- Type: Enlisted rating
- Abbreviation: ME
- Specialty: Law enforcement Counter-Terrorism

The Maritime Enforcement Specialist (ME) rating is the uniformed law enforcement specialist of the United States Coast Guard. Responsible for law enforcement and force protection, these personnel are trained in traditional maritime law enforcement, anti-terrorism, force protection, port security and safety, and unit-level training.

== Mission ==
MEs are the Coast Guard's tactical specialists. When situations demand the high risk tactics, such as helicopter insertion or Visit, board, search, and seizure, MEs get the call. Most MEs are typically assigned to special mission unit: Deployable Specialized Forces (DSF). MEs can also be assigned to a Maritime Force Protection Unit (MFPU), or United States Coast Guard Police shore units.

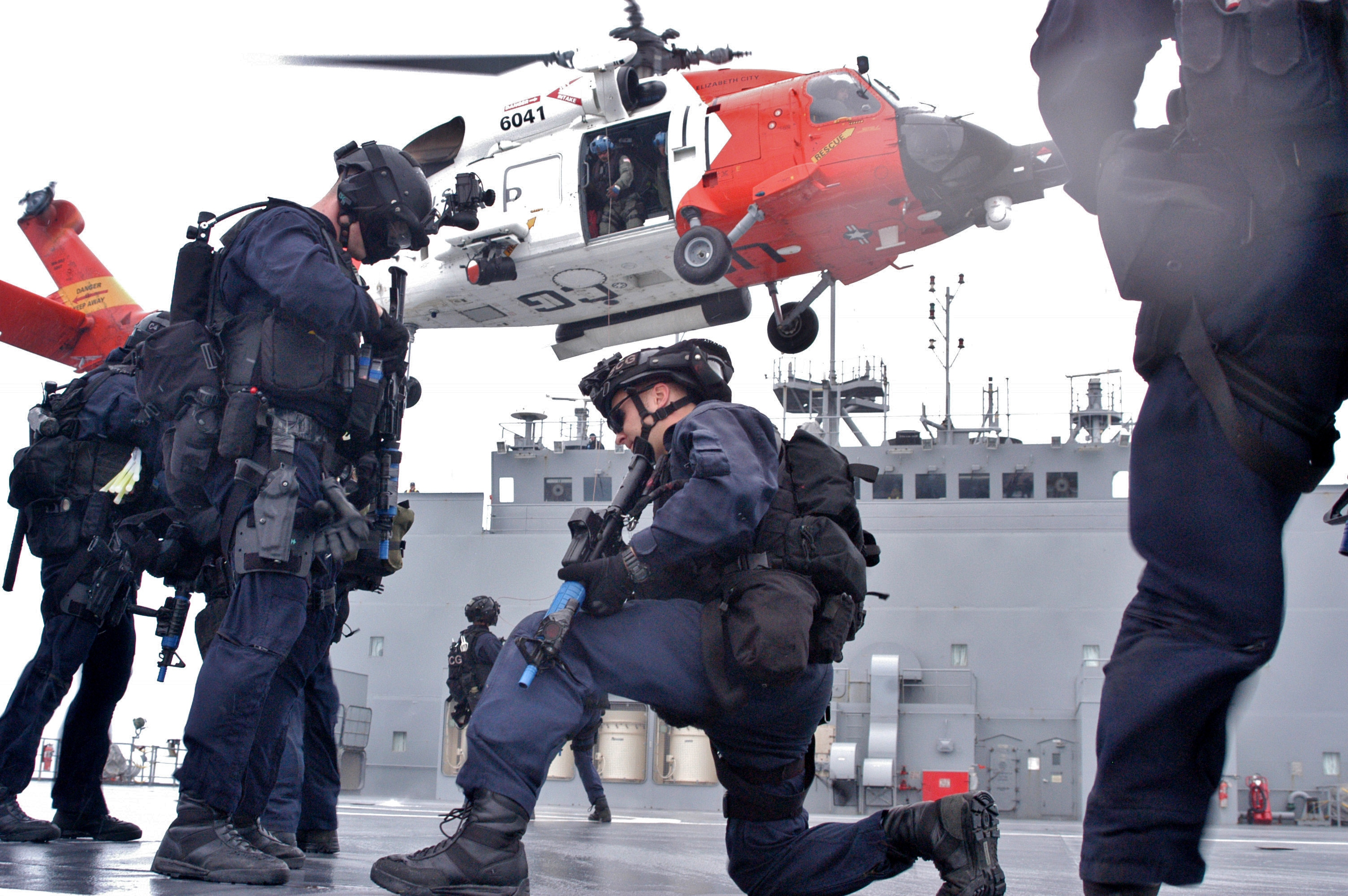
MSRT MEs depart USNS Sisler via Coast Guard helicopter

Professionals serving in areas such as: inter-agency operations, security and response, security and anti-terrorism force protection, training, and administration.

== History ==
A recent addition to the personnel of the U.S. Coast Guard inventory, Coast Guardsmen in the ME rating are trained and qualified to provide security and law enforcement support for U.S. Coast Guard assets. The first class of Coast Guardsmen graduated from ME "A" School on 14 April 2010.

=== Port Security Specialist ===
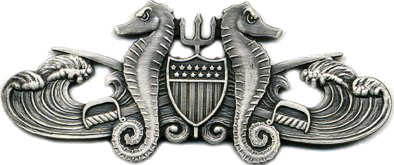
Port Security Enlisted Qualification Badge

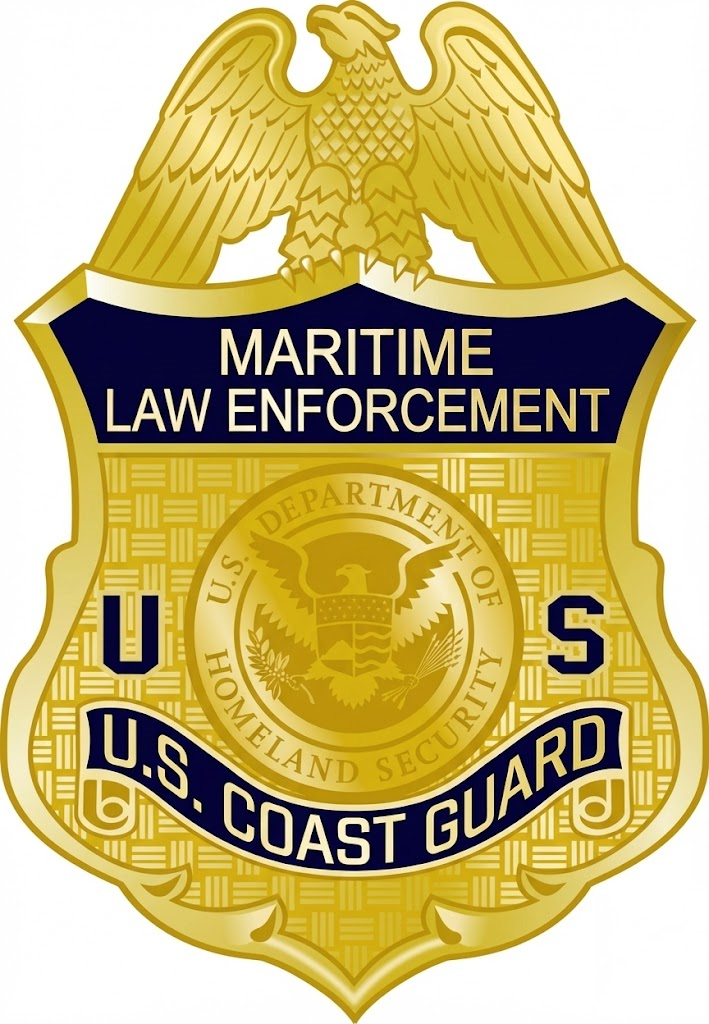
Maritime Law Enforcement Badge

Port Security Specialist (PS) was disestablished and merged into the Maritime Enforcement (ME) rating in 2010. Port Security Specialists supported Department of Defense national-defense operations overseas as a member of a Naval Coastal Warfare Unit, or a Coast Guard Port Security Unit. Worked at a Sector to ensure the physical security of a major U.S. port, or were members of a Maritime Safety and Security Team (MSST). MSSTs are capable of being deployed throughout the United States to provide heightened waterside and shoreside security in support of maritime homeland security operations.

== Training and qualifications ==
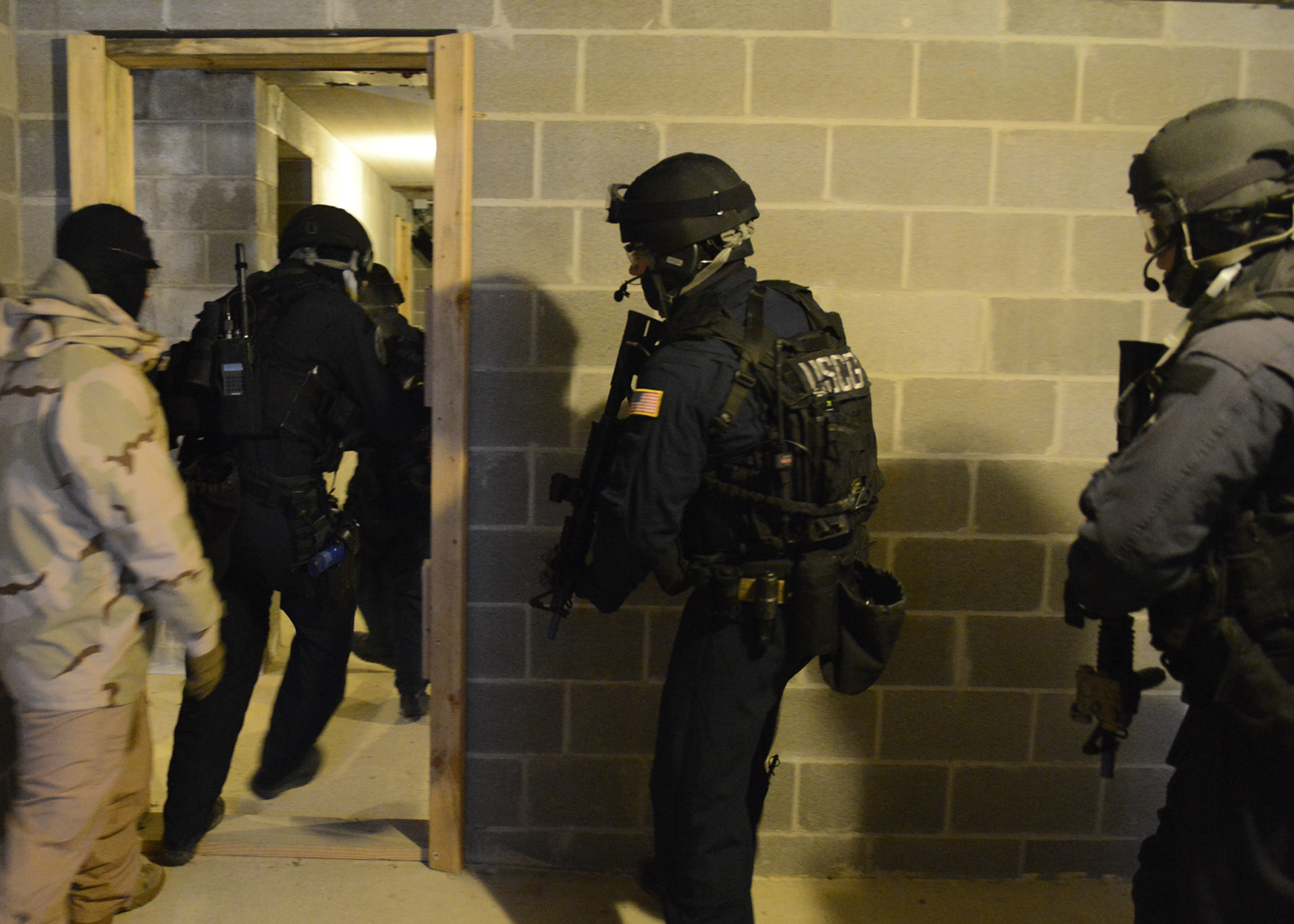
MEs tactical CQB training

=== Maritime Enforcement "A" school ===
Personnel selected to attend the 10-week long ME "A" School, located in Charleston, South Carolina at the Federal Law Enforcement Training Centers must first meet certain eligibility requirements.

=== Individual Specialty Training ===
These courses lead to required qualifications and designations that collectively allow MEs to advance as operators. Many of the schools are from Special Missions Training Center (SMTC) and Maritime Law Enforcement Academy.

- Crew Served Weapon, Mk 19, 40mm Machine Gun Course
- Boarding Team Member (BTM) Course
- Ports, Waterways, and Coastal Security Course
- Port Security Unit Basic Skills Course
- Close Quarters Combat Course (CQC)
- Basic Tactical Operations Course (BTOC)
- Boarding Officer Course (BOC)
- Tactical Coxswain Course (TCC)
- Radiation Detection Level II Operators Course
- Advanced Tactical Operations Course
- Precision Marksman Course
- Advanced Marksmanship Instructor Course (AMI)
- Close Quarters Combat Instructor (CQCI)
- Precision Marksman Instructor

=== Minimum Qualifications ===
The following are the eligibility criteria to be selected as an ME:

- Minimum ASVAB score: VE + AR = 100
- Eligible for a secret clearance. Commands must certify that the member is a U. S. citizen and has an approved NACLC security package on file.
- Normal color perception in accordance with the Medical Manual, COMDTINST M6000.1 (series).
- Member is within maximum allowable weight in accordance with Allowable Weight Standards for Coast Guard Military Personnel, COMDTINST M1020.8 (series).
- Eligible to possess a firearm (Lautenberg Amendment Compliance – DD 2760) in accordance with COMDTINST 10100.1(series).
- A valid state drivers license.
- 24 months of obligated service from date of graduation.
