= JMTC =

JMTC may refer to:

- Joint Maritime Training Center, a joint U.S. Coast Guard, Navy, and Marine Corps training center
- Joint Multinational Training Command, a U.S. Army training command
