= Sea marshal =

Law enforcement officer classification

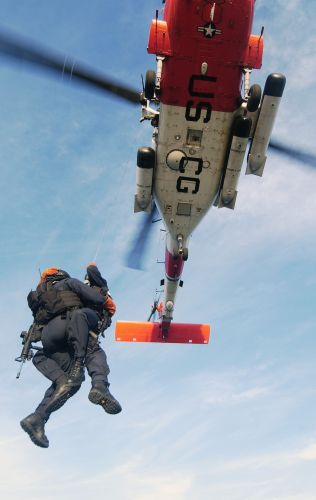
Two USCG Sea Marshals from the Deployable Specialized Forces boarding a vessel by means of vertical delivery from a USCG HH-60 Jayhawk helicopter

Sea marshal is an internationally recognized term to describe armed law enforcement officers who board, sweep, search, protect, escort, and maintain control of vessels to prevent hijacking or acts of terrorism. In the United States of America, a sea marshal (more recently renamed "boarding officer") is a federal law enforcement officer who conducts fully armed boardings of maritime vessels for the purposes of ensuring the security and safety of the United States as well as the boarded ship, its cargo, and crew. Sea marshals/boarding officers operate under the jurisdiction of the United States Coast Guard within the US Department of Homeland Security.

== History ==
The sea marshal program was first created following the terrorist attacks of September 11, 2001. It was initially launched using reservists from the Coast Guard Investigative Service (CGIS) in the Port of San Francisco immediately following the attacks as a temporary effort to provide port security. Sea marshals were later deployed in the ports of Long Beach, Los Angeles, and San Diego California. On the east coast, a large team of mobilized reservists - mostly civilian police officers from the New York-New Jersey region - was created to protect the Port of NY/NJ. Similar units were created in Boston, Miami, Fort Lauderdale, and Hampton Roads.

The sea marshal concept was driven by the idea of a cruise ship, cargo vessel, container ship, freighter or another large maritime vessel entering a port unsecured; a large and vulnerable target for attack, or potentially even bearing destructive intentions itself. Vessels commonly carry stowaways, and terror operatives have been discovered as recently as 2003. This terrorist delivery route was proven effective by the seaborne 2008 Mumbai attacks, in India. After hijacking a fishing trawler and killing the crew to provide cover and avoid detection by the Indian Coast Guard, terrorists showed fake identification papers to Indian Coast Guard boarding officers and were allowed to continue on their way. Terrorist teams then sailed close to the Mumbai coast and deployed in a smallboat laden with arms and explosives. Once ashore, they killed and wounded hundreds in a standoff battle that went on for four days.

In the US, sea marshals were created to provide a line of defense against ports, the critical infrastructure within and underneath them, and the economic throughput of maritime industry in the United States: ports and cargo ships account for 95% of all economic trade in the country.

== Composition of boarding teams ==
US Coast Guard boarding teams consist of both boarding officers and boarding team members. Members of the boarding teams can be enlisted, warrant officers, or commissioned officers.

== Operations ==
The coast guard conducts both random and required boardings of all types of ships incoming to U.S. ports; typically large port-bound vessels. The boardings are usually conducted offshore while the vessel is en route to the port to ensure they arrive safely, and to minimize interruptions to the economic flow within the port.

Boarding teams are trained to board from the side of a vessel via a rope ladder from a pilot boat or another coast guard vessel, or by vertical delivery from a helicopter.

Although boardings are intended to focus on homeland security missions, while conducting searches on the vessel, boarding members also come across illegal drugs, smuggling and other violations of maritime laws. They have the authority to enforce all such laws, while boarding officers (not boarding team members) may also conduct arrests based on violations of maritime law.

Sea marshals receive extensive tactical and operational law enforcement training by the US Coast Guard, but also conduct cross-training and joint operations with the FBI, Customs, US Navy, and other agencies.

Qualified boarding team members and boarding officers can also serve in other coast guard units, including TACLET and LEDET units, as well as on board coast guard cutters.

== Legal jurisdiction ==
United States Code, Title 14, Section 89(a) provides the legal authority and jurisdiction for the US Coast Guard to operate the program and for its officers to board incoming vessels:

Sec. 89. Law enforcement

(a) The Coast Guard may make inquiries, examinations, inspections, searches, seizures, and arrests upon the high seas and waters over which the United States has jurisdiction, for the prevention, detection, and suppression of violations of laws of the United States. For such purposes, commissioned, warrant, and petty officers may at any time go on board of any vessel subject to the jurisdiction, or to the operation of any law, of the United States, address inquiries to those on board, examine the ship's documents and papers, and examine, inspect, and search the vessel and use all necessary force to compel compliance. When from such inquiries, examination, inspection, or search it appears that a breach of the laws of the United States rendering a person liable to arrest is being, or has been committed, by any person, such person shall be arrested or, if escaping to shore, shall be immediately pursued and arrested on shore, or other lawful and appropriate action shall be taken; or, if it shall appear that a breach of the laws of the United States has been committed so as to render such vessel, or the merchandise, or any part thereof, on board of, or brought into the United States by, such vessel, liable to forfeiture, or so as to render such vessel liable to a fine or penalty and if necessary to secure such fine or penalty, such vessel or such merchandise, or both, shall be seized.

(b) The officers of the Coast Guard insofar as they are engaged, pursuant to the authority contained in this section, in enforcing any law of the United States shall:

(1) be deemed to be acting as agents of the particular executive department or independent establishment charged with the administration of the particular law; and
(2) be subject to all the rules and regulations promulgated by such department or independent establishment with respect to the enforcement of that law.

(c) The provisions of this section are in addition to any powers conferred by law upon such officers, and not in limitation of any powers conferred by law upon such officers, or any other officers of the United States.

(Aug. 4, 1949, ch. 393, 63 Stat. 502; Aug. 3, 1950, ch. 536, Sec. 1, 64 Stat. 406.)

== See also ==
- Maritime Safety and Security Team
