= Law Enforcement Detachments =

Team of United States Coast Guard

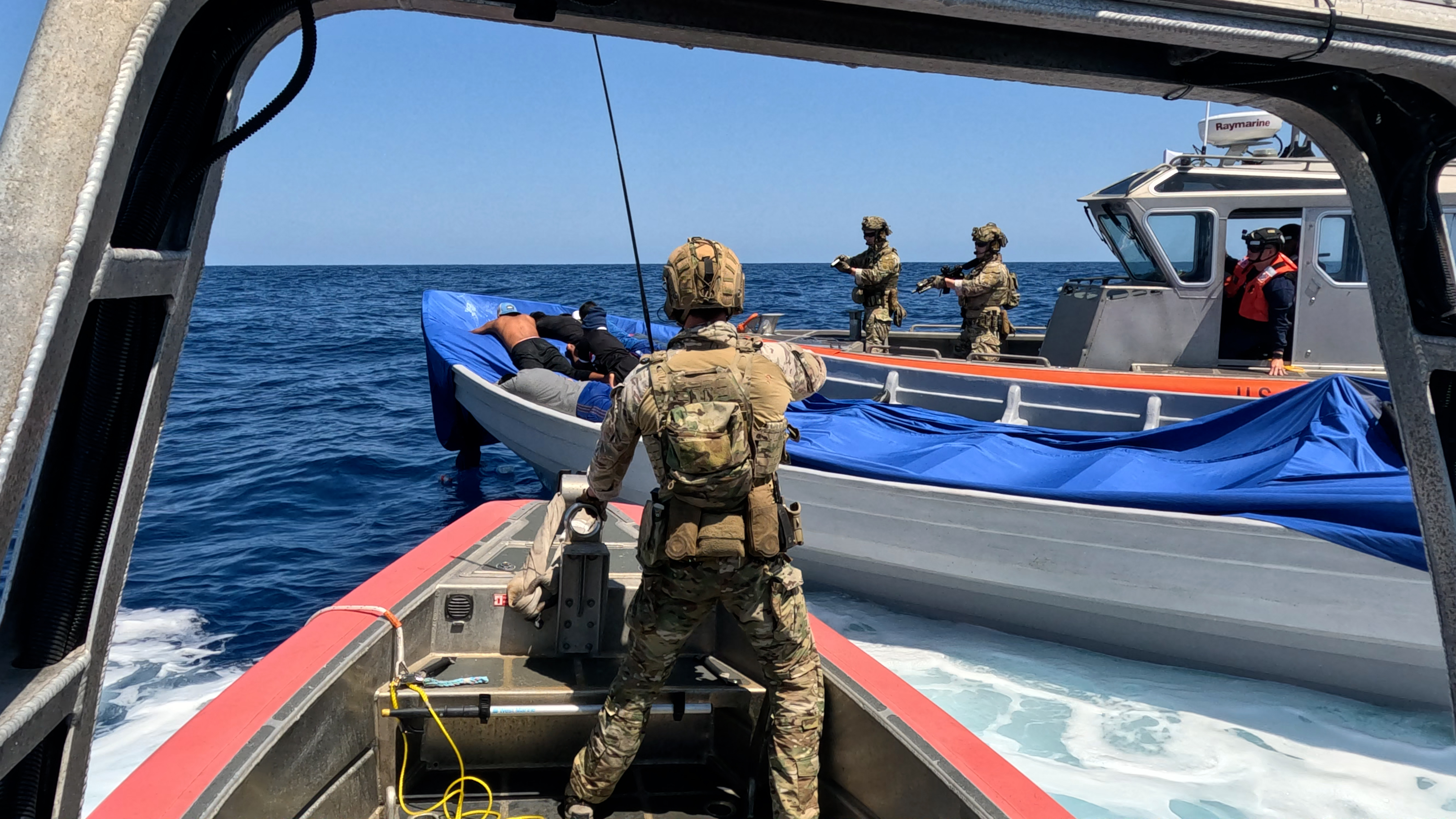
Tactical Law Enforcement Team South interdicts illegal drugs in Eastern Pacific Ocean

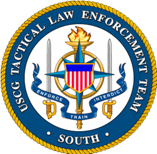
U.S. Department of Homeland Security, Coast Guard, Tactical Law Enforcement emblem

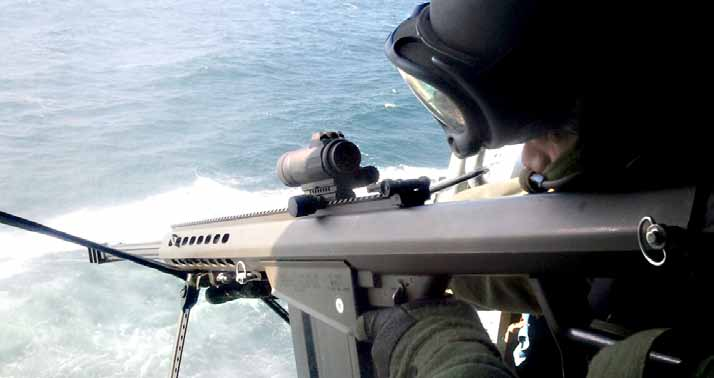
TACLET Sniper Airborne use of force

Law Enforcement Detachments (LEDETs) are specialized, deployable maritime law enforcement teams of the United States Coast Guard. First established in 1982, their primary mission is to deploy aboard U.S. and allied naval vessels to conduct counter-drug operations and support maritime law enforcement, interdiction, or security operations. LEDETs are the operational elements of the Coast Guard’s two Tactical Law Enforcement Teams (TACLETs) which are part of the Coast Guard’s Deployable Specialized Forces (DSF). As of April 2010 there are seventeen LEDETs.

== History ==
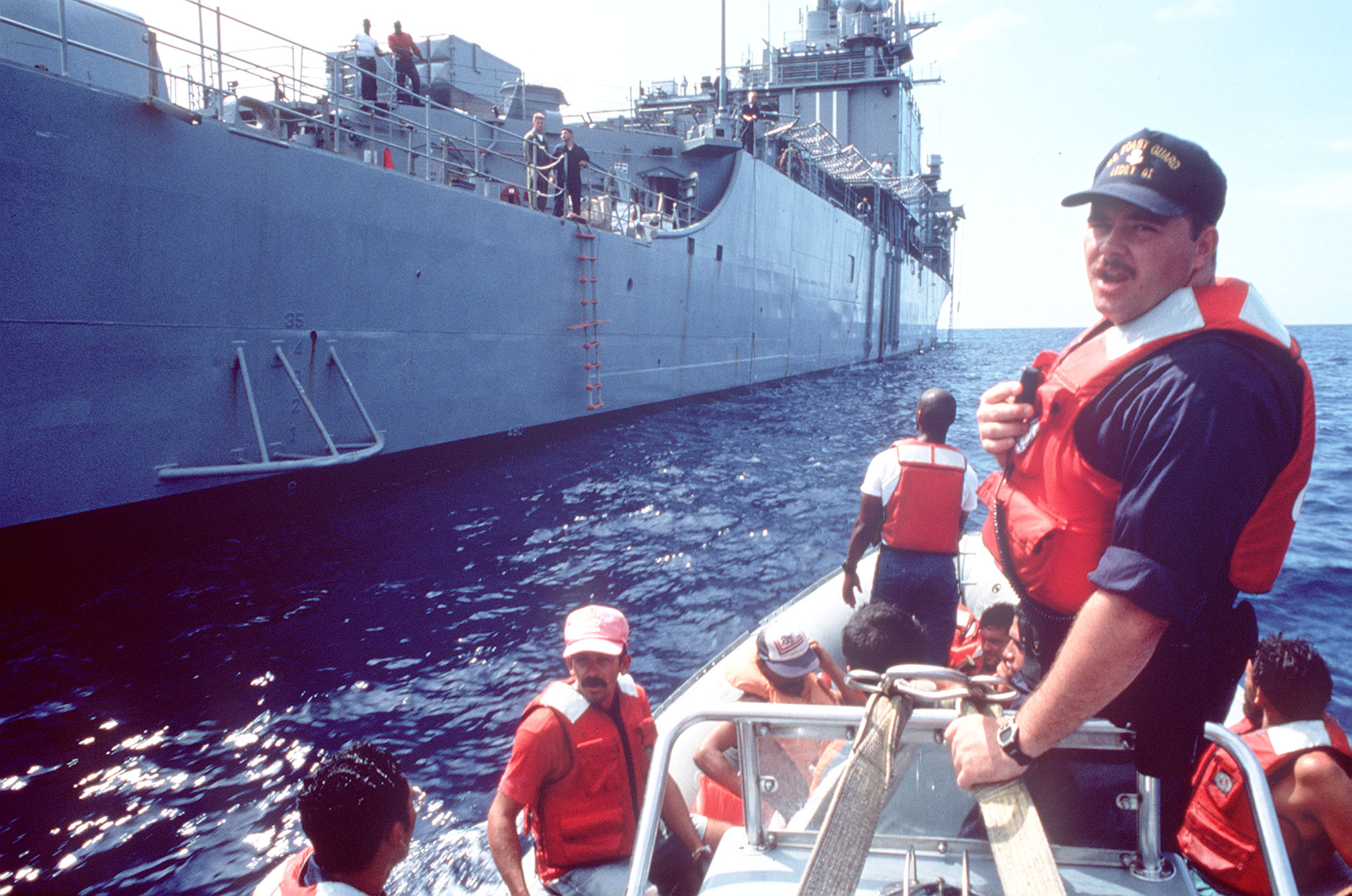
Members of LEDET 1 conduct migrant interdiction operations during Operation Able Vigil in September 1994.

The Coast Guard officially established the Law Enforcement Detachment program in 1982. The first LEDETs operated directly under Coast Guard groups and districts, where they served as law enforcement specialists, conducting training and local operations. In 1986, Public Law (P.L.) 99-570 specifically authorized the establishment of billets for active duty Coast Guard personnel to carry out drug interdiction operations from naval surface vessels provided by the Department of Defense (DoD). Since the Posse Comitatus Act and department policy strictly prohibit Department of Defense personnel from directly engaging in law enforcement activities, LEDETs were tasked with operating aboard United States Navy (USN) ships to investigate contacts and conduct boardings in accordance with Coast Guard policy and directives. In accordance with P.L. 99-570, LEDETs were to deploy aboard U.S. Navy "ships of opportunity", transiting or operating in areas frequently used by illegal drug traffickers. In 1988, P.L. 100-456 made it a requirement that Coast Guard law enforcement personnel be assigned to each appropriate Navy surface vessel that transits a drug interdiction area.

The 1989 National Defense Authorization Act designated the DoD as the lead agency of the Federal Government for the detection and monitoring of aerial and maritime trafficking of illegal drugs into the United States or any of its commonwealths, territories, or possessions. In turn, the Coast Guard was designated the lead agency for the interdiction and apprehension of illegal drug traffickers on the high seas. In order to meet these statutory responsibilities, the DoD began deploying surface assets to drug interdiction areas, making ships available for direct support of Coast Guard law enforcement operations.

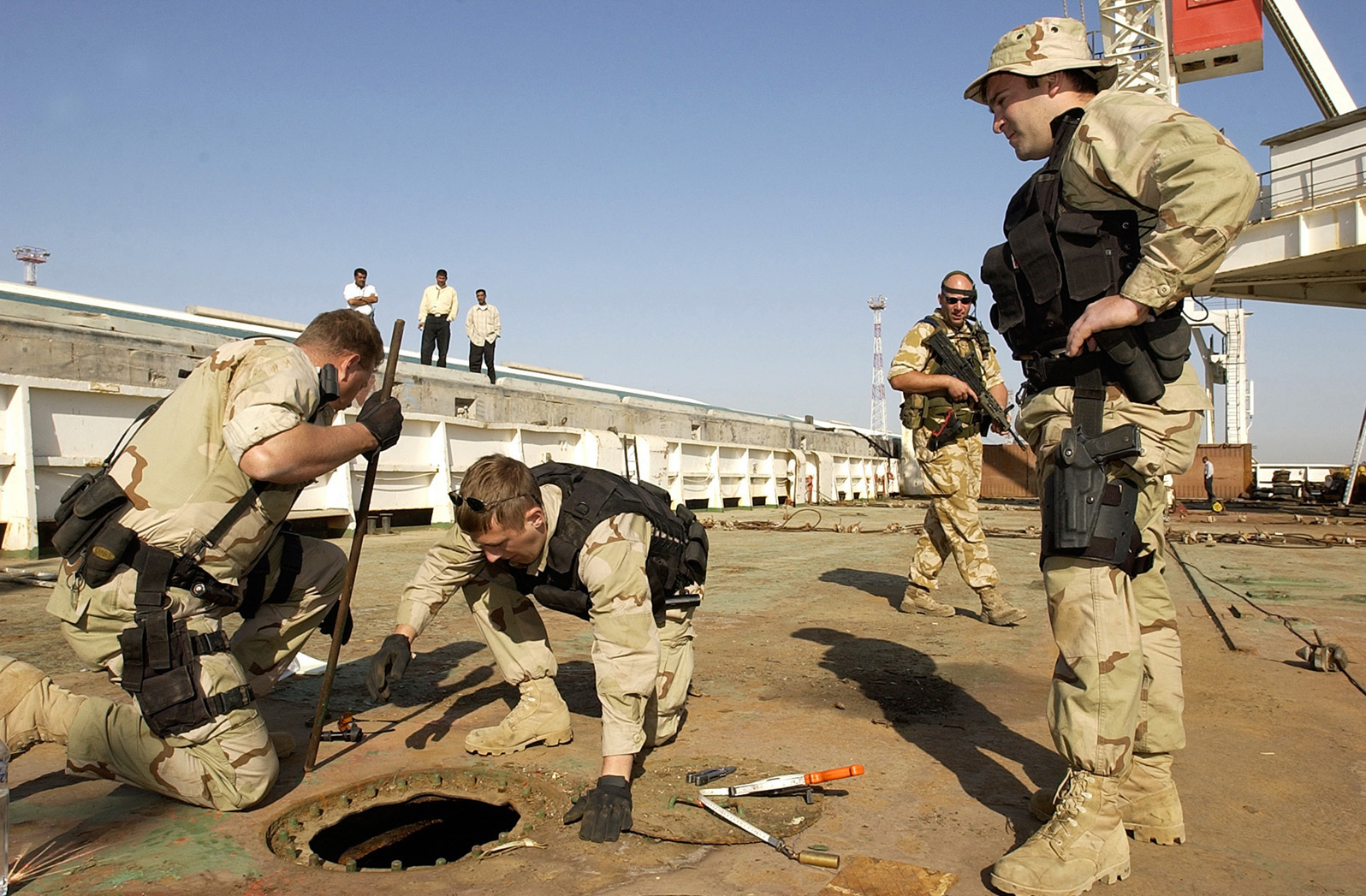
Law Enforcement Detachment 203 conducting dockside inspection of suspected smuggling on oil ship during Operation Iraqi Freedom

In the 1990s, the individual LEDETs were consolidated under three Tactical Law Enforcement Teams (TACLETs): Tactical Law Enforcement Team North (TACLET North) based in Chesapeake, Virginia, Tactical Law Enforcement Team Gulf (TACLET Gulf) based in New Orleans, Louisiana, Tactical Law Enforcement Team South (TACLET South), based in Opa-locka, Florida, and the Pacific Area Tactical Law Enforcement Team (PACTACLET) based in San Diego, California. In 2004, TACLET North was decommissioned and merged with Maritime Safety and Security Team 91102 to form a new counter-terrorism unit which was eventually named the Maritime Security Response Team (MSRT).

From July 2007 to April 2013, the Tactical Law Enforcement Teams and Law Enforcement Detachments were part of the Coast Guard's Deployable Operations Group (DOG) in an effort to organize the Coast Guard's various deployable specialized forces (DSF) under a single command. In April 2013, the DOG was disbanded and the TACLETs returned to control of the area commanders.

== Capabilities ==
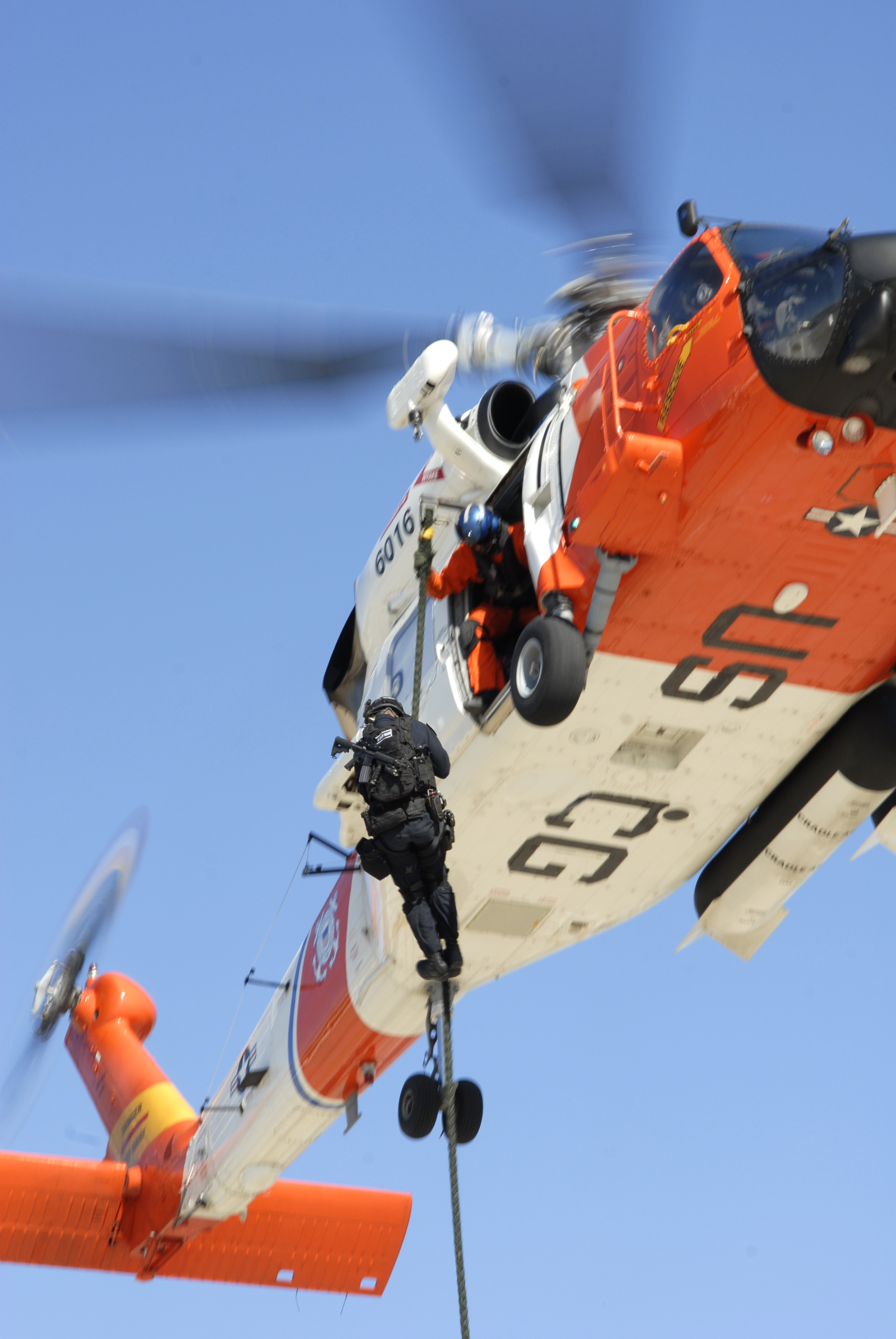
A member of PACTACLET conducts a vertical insertion drill

Law Enforcement Detachments currently consist of anywhere between six and eleven members and are usually commanded by a Lieutenant (junior grade) or Lieutenant. Personnel are trained in close quarters combat (CQC), vertical insertion techniques, and container climbing. Personnel also receive special training as precision marksmen, emergency medical technicians, or linguists. In addition to providing law enforcement boarding teams, LEDETs also have specially trained aerial gunners which can deploy aboard ship-based Navy helicopters to provide airborne use of force against smugglers, filling a role similar to the Coast Guard's Helicopter Interdiction Tactical Squadron.

LEDET members are eligible to receive the Tactical Law Enforcement Badge after eighteen months of LEDET duty.

== Operations ==
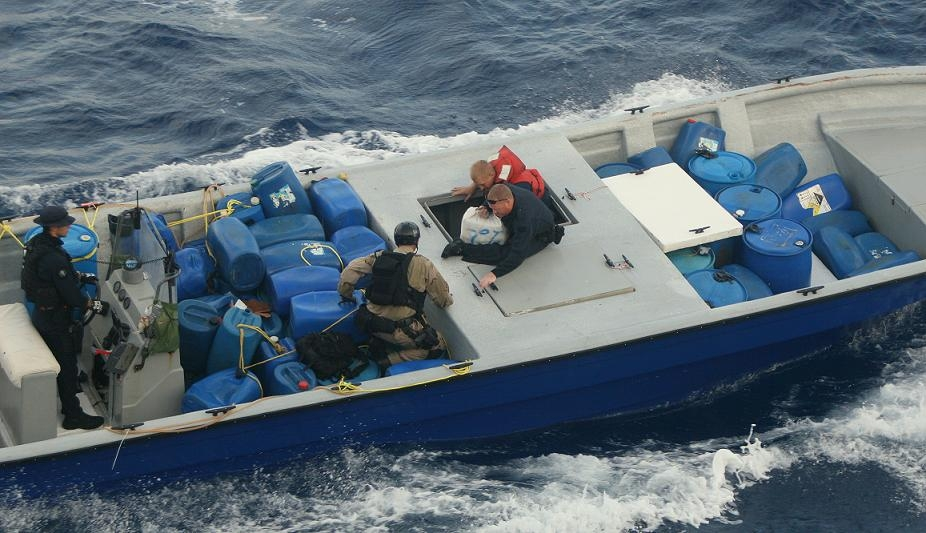
Members of LEDET 409 aboard a seized go-fast boat

=== Drug interdiction ===
Counter-drug operations are the LEDETs primary mission, although they also conduct other military indication mission types. Beginning in May 1993, LEDETs began deploying aboard foreign as well as U.S. naval vessels. LEDETs have successfully deployed aboard vessels of the British Royal Navy, the Royal Netherlands Navy, the Belgian Navy, and the Royal Canadian Navy. LEDETs have successfully seized numerous smuggling vessels including go-fast boats, larger fishing vessels, and self propelled semi-submersible vessels and as of March 2007, LEDETs had taken part in nine of the eleven largest cocaine seizures.

=== Examples of counter-drug operations ===
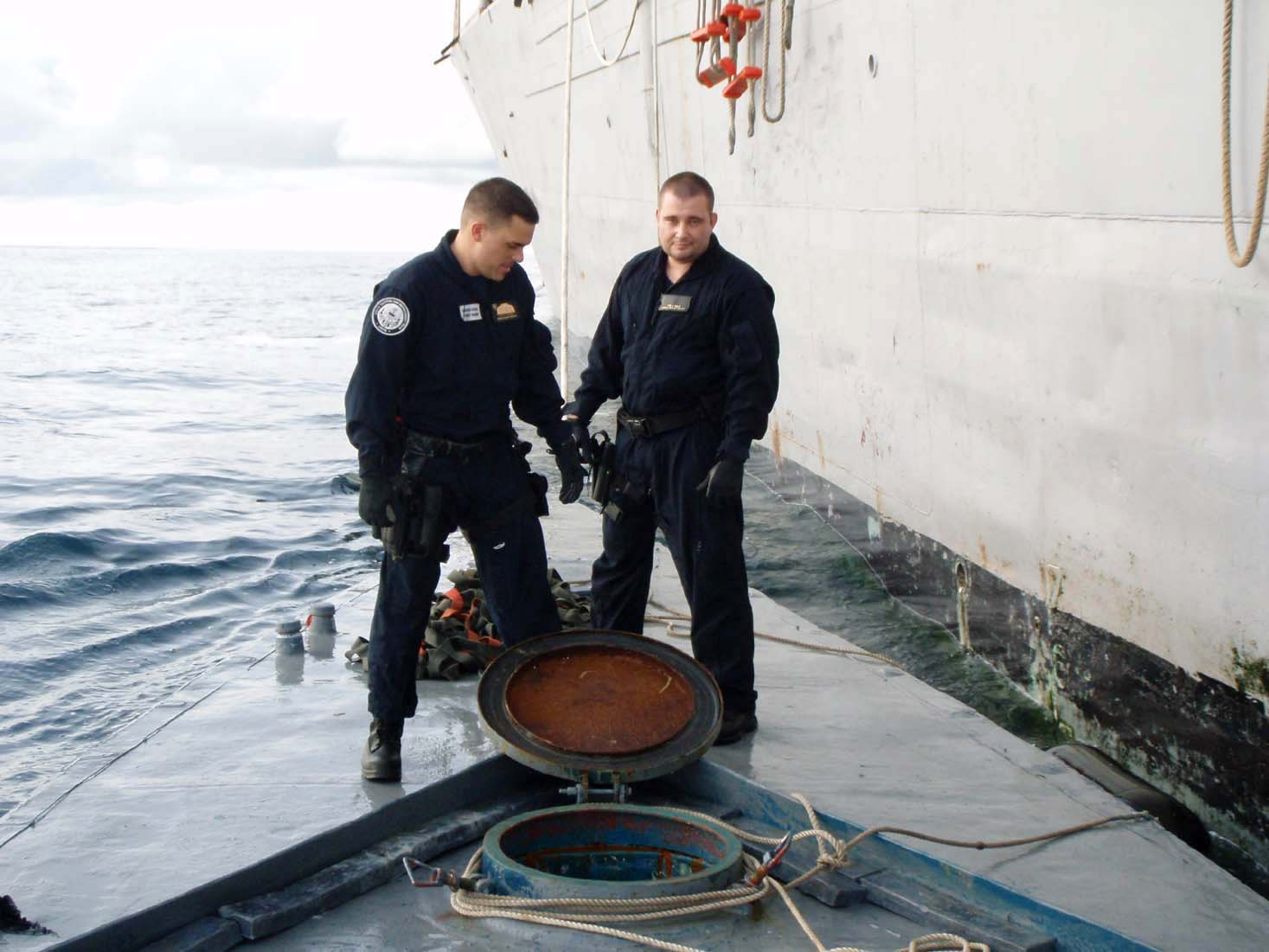
LEDET aboard semi-submersible

The first joint U.S. Coast Guard-U.S. Navy airborne use of force interdiction occurred on 10 September 2006 when USS John L. Hall, LEDET 408 from TACLET South, and Detachment 1 from U.S. Navy Helicopter Anti-Submarine (Light) Squadron 60 (HSC-60) intercepted a go-fast boat north of the Colombian coast.

On 13 September 2008 LEDET 404 deployed aboard USS McInerney seized a 59-foot (18 m) self-propelled, semi-submersible (SPSS) vessel 350 miles (560 km) west of Guatemala during a nighttime boarding. The SPSS had been detected by a U.S. Navy patrol aircraft which vectored McInerney towards the vessel. McInerney launched two small-boats to interdict the vessel and LEDET 404 boarded the vessel under cover of darkness effectively surprising the crew. Upon realizing that they were being boarded, the smugglers first tried to throw the boarding team from the vessel by rapidly reversing the engines and then opened seacocks to scuttle the vessel but then complied with the boarding team’s orders to close them again. The vessel was found to be carrying seven tons of cocaine.

In April 2010, a LEDET deployed aboard McInerney utilized an unmanned aerial vehicle, namely a MQ-8 Fire Scout, to interdict a go-fast vessel carrying approximately 570 lb (260 kg) of cocaine. During nighttime hours, the Fire Scout detected a cocaine laden go-fast vessel transiting in the Eastern Pacific Ocean. It was able to covertly monitor the go-fast for three hours, capturing video evidence of the go fast rendezvousing with a logistics/refueling vessel. The LEDET, launching from McInerney, nabbed both the go-fast and the logistics vessel, seizing approximately 130 lb (60 kg) of cocaine and causing the drug runners to jettison another 440 lb (200 kg).

In July 2019, a LEDET from the Pacific Tactical Law Enforcement Team deployed aboard the Coast Guard Cutter Munro interdicted a Self-Propelled Semi-Submersible. A LEDET member was captured on film jumping onto the vessel, causing it to heave to. The dramatic video went viral and was cited by the President of the United States.

=== Maritime interdiction and security ===
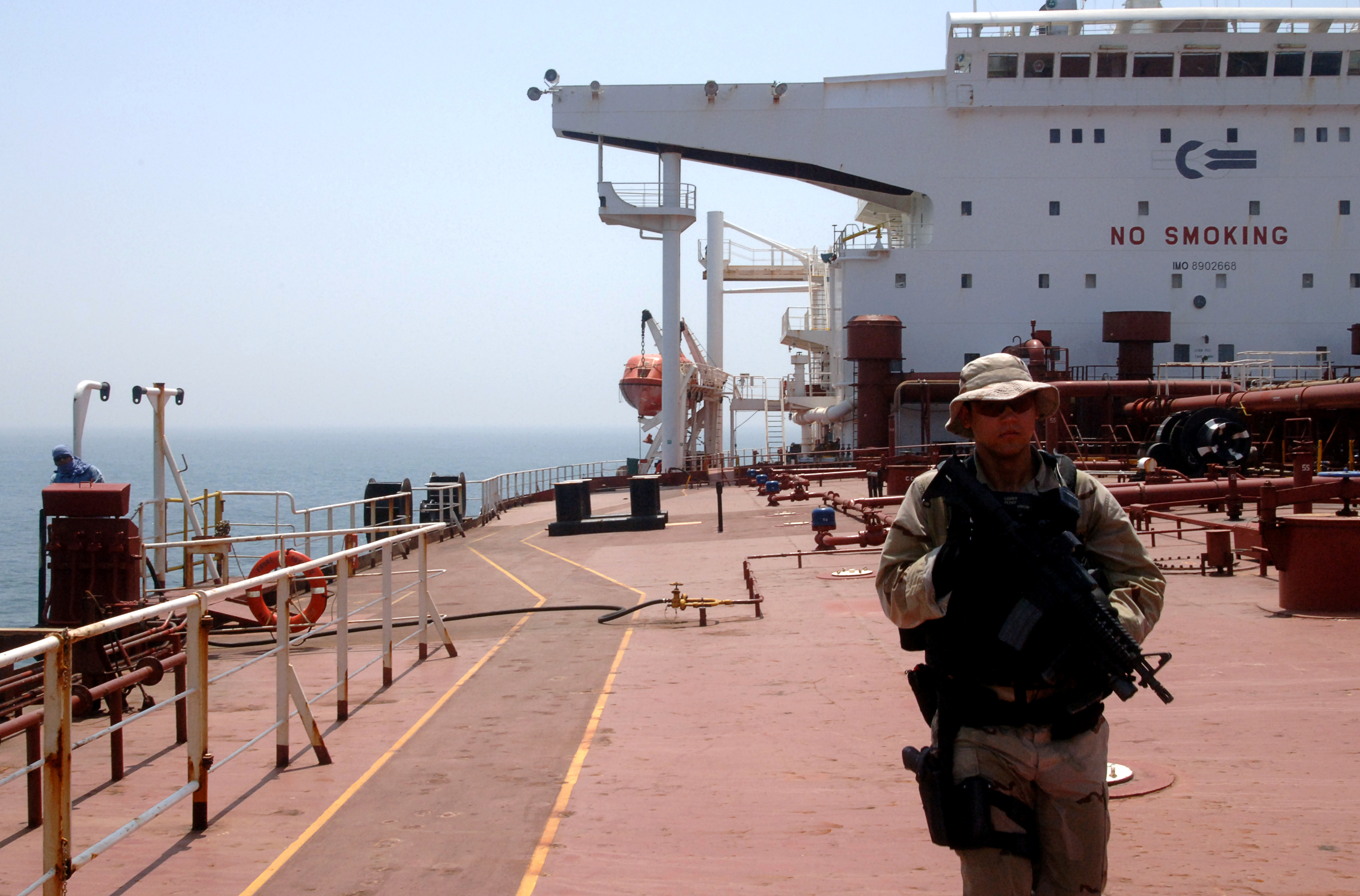
A member of LEDET 106 performs a security sweep aboard a tanker in the North Persian Gulf

While counter-drug law enforcement is one of the LEDETs' largest missions, they have played an important role in military maritime interdiction and maritime security operations, conducting boardings and assisting in training U.S. and allied boarding teams.

During Operations Desert Shield and Desert Storm in 1990 and 1991, ten four-member LEDETs were deployed to the Persian Gulf to support the enforcement of the United Nations sanctions against Iraq. The first boarding of an Iraqi vessel conducted by a LEDET occurred on 30 August 1990. Five days later, a Coast Guard-led boarding team from USS Goldsborough seized control of the Iraqi cargo ship Zanoobia and took it to Oman after the master refused to take his ship to a non-Iraqi or Kuwaiti port. Of the six hundred boardings conducted by U.S. naval forces, Coast Guard LEDETs either led or supported approximately sixty percent. LEDETs also assisted in training allied boarding teams and, shortly after the beginning of Operation Desert Storm, the LEDET aboard USS Nicholas assisted in clearing eleven Iraqi oil platforms and taking twenty three prisoners.

In November 1993 four LEDETs were deployed aboard NATO vessels in Southern Europe to support the operations enforcing the United Nations embargo against the former Socialist Federal Republic of Yugoslavia during the Yugoslav Wars.

Law Enforcement Detachments also played a role in the Iraq War. Two LEDETs were already deployed to the Northern Persian Gulf before preparation for Operation Iraqi Freedom began. During Operation Iraqi Freedom LEDETs were deployed aboard navy coastal patrol vessels. On 24 April 2004 Petty Officer 3rd Class Nathan Bruckenthal, assigned to LEDET 403 deployed aboard USS Firebolt, was killed in action at the Khawr Al Amay Oil Terminal off the coast of Iraq in a terrorist-suicide bombing. Petty Officer Bruckenthal was the first Coast Guardsman killed in action since the Vietnam War and was posthumously awarded the Bronze Star and the Purple Heart.

=== Counter-piracy ===
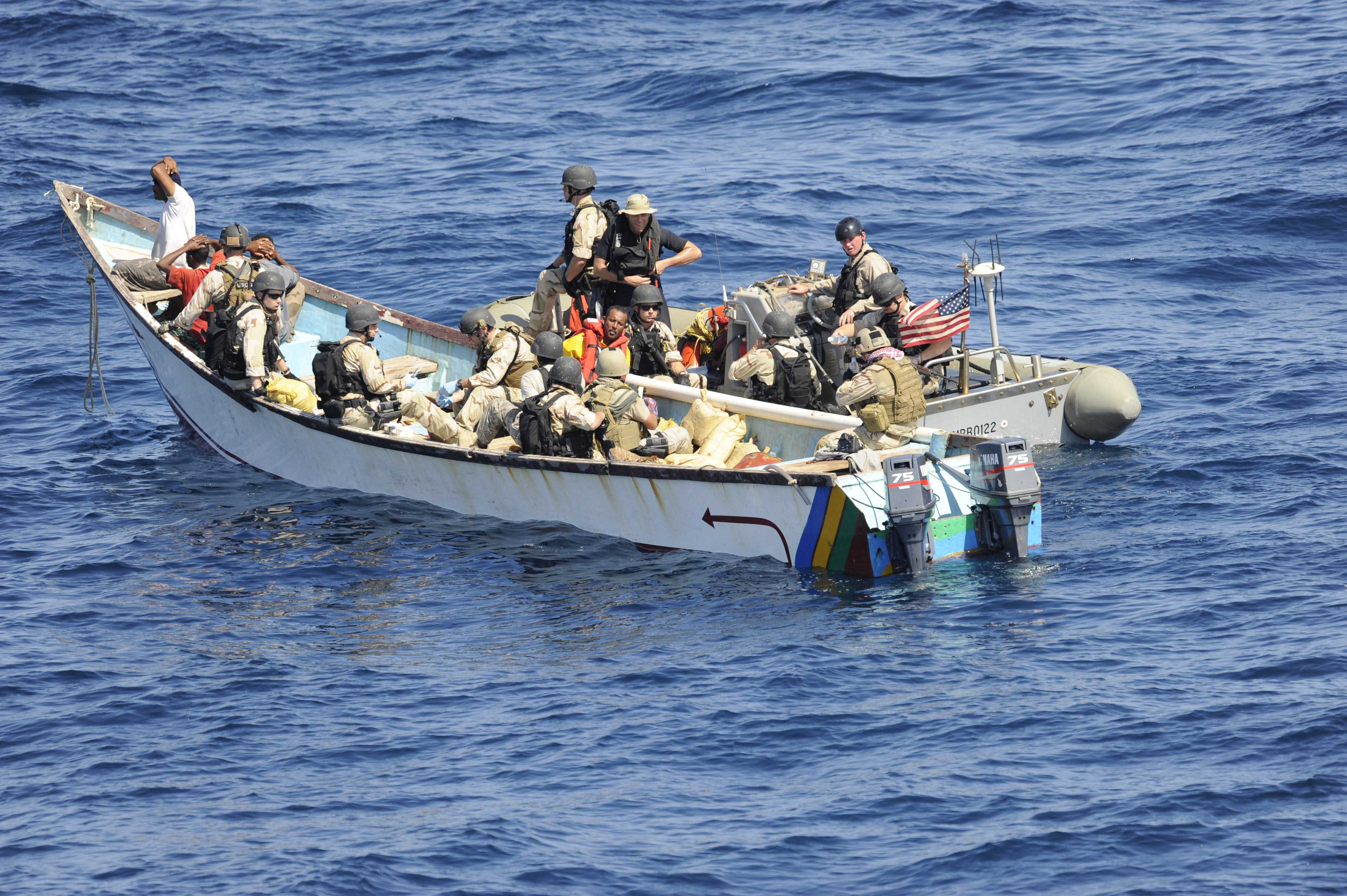
Members of a visit, board, search and seizure team from the guided-missile cruiser USS Anzio (CG 68) and U.S. Coast Guard Maritime Safety and Security Team 91104 search a skiff off the coast of Somalia

LEDETs deployed aboard U.S. Navy ships as part of Combined Task Force 151 (CTF-151) to conduct counter-piracy operations off the coast of Somalia. On 13 May 2009 LEDET 409 assisted in the first capture of a pirate "mother ship" by CTF-151 after a U.S. Navy helicopter responding to a vessel under attack by pirates located a suspected pirate dhow. LEDET 409 and a Visit, Board, Search, and Seizure (VBSS) team from USS Gettysburg boarded the dhow and apprehended seventeen suspected pirates after finding assault rifles and a rocket-propelled grenade launcher aboard.

In May 2010, another LEDET operating in the Gulf of Oman with USS San Jacinto stopped a dhow which had been hijacked by pirates. They captured 13 pirates and freed the Yemeni mariners.

=== Alien migrant interdiction ===
LEDETs have conducted operations to interdict illegal migrants including Operation Able Vigil in 1994. One of the most dangerous migrant interdiction operations occurred in September 1998 after USCGC Douglas Munro interdicted the motor vessel Chih Yung with 172 Chinese migrants aboard. The cutter requested support in handling the migrants and two teams from PACTACLET were deployed to assist. The LEDET and the cutter's boarding team had to combat riots, hunger strikes, and suicide attempts before all 172 migrants were turned over to Immigration and Naturalization Service officials in San Diego.

== Selection and training ==
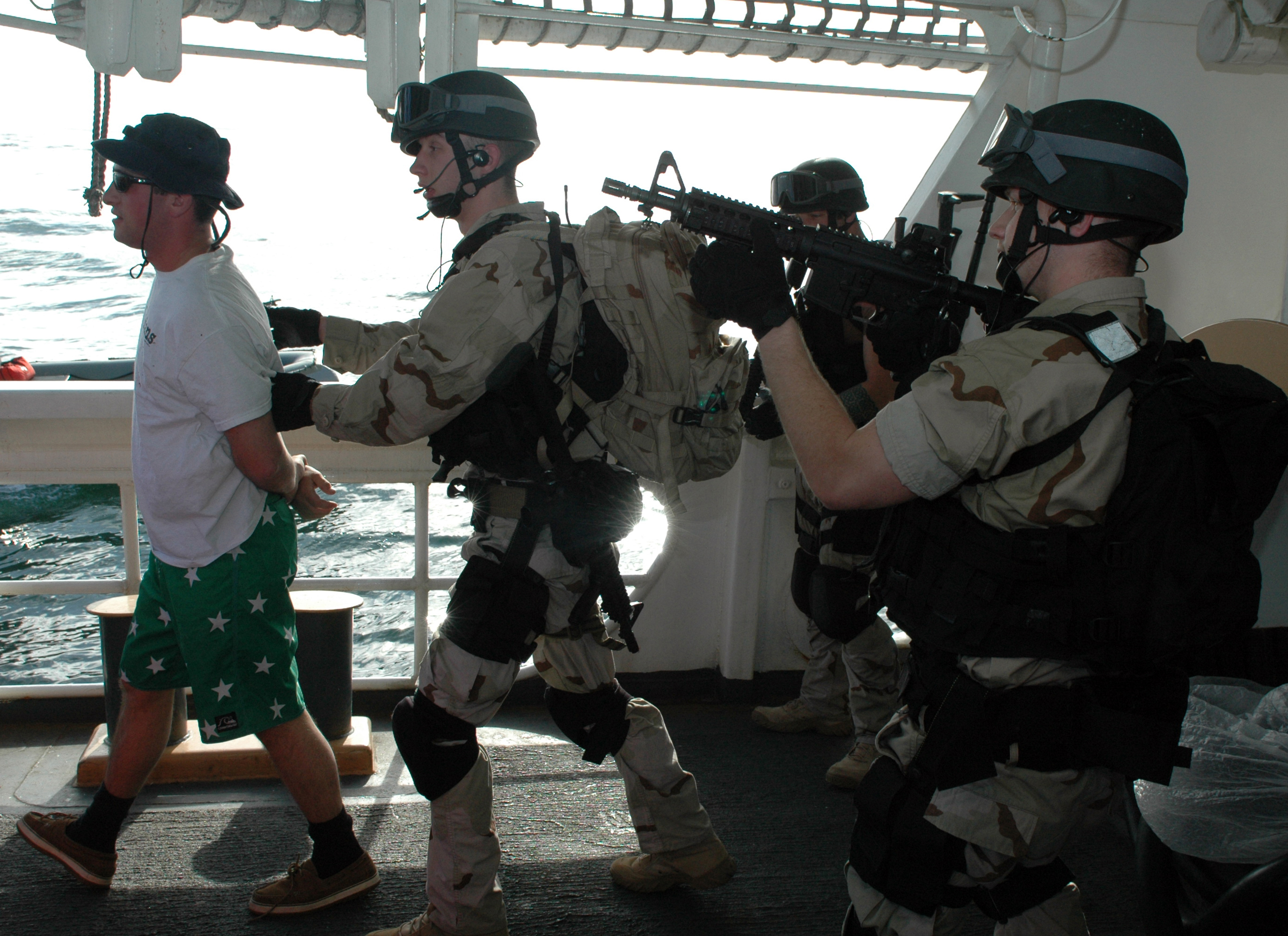
Boarding team conducting exercise

A competitive candidate should have attended Boarding Officer (BO) school or, at a minimum, Boarding Team Member (BTM) school and have prior Coast Guard maritime law enforcement experience.

During selection, candidates can expect to undergo 8 weeks of indoctrination or, Green Team, where they are tested mentally and physically through tasks such as water survival, drug and counter drug interdiction, East pacific and Caribbean geography, drug law as well as dive deeper into maritime law. Upon graduation from Green Team, members are assigned to a LEDET. After being selected, LEDET members will prepare and train within their unit for the Tactical Operations Course (TOC) held at the Special Missions Training Center. This 12 week course delivers maritime interdiction common tactical skills and advanced tactical marksmanship to prepare personnel for high risk response mission operations.

Following TOC, LEDET trainees will attend the Boarding Officer Course at the Maritime Law Enforcement Academy. The Boarding Officer Course (BOC) is offered to U.S. Coast Guard personnel and foreign naval officers. The purpose of the BOC is to prepare Boarding Officers for the arduous duties associated with enforcing laws and treaties at sea. Graduates of BOC possess the skills and knowledge necessary to lead a Coast Guard boarding team in the enforcement of U.S. laws and regulations in a safe and professional manner.

In unit training consists of vertical insertion, hook and climb, and various other squad and team level assaults. Select members of the 12 man LEDETs will continue to receive more specialized training as medics, communications specialists, breaching specialists, precision marksmen, or language specialists. Training in the unit takes 18 months, graduation from TOC and certification as a Boarding Officer before a candidate is awarded the Tactical Law Enforcement Badge.

== See also ==
- Helicopter Interdiction Tactical Squadron
- Maritime Safety and Security Team
- Maritime Security Response Team
- Patrol Forces Southwest Asia
- Visit, Board, Search, and Seizure
