= Maritime Law Enforcement Academy =

US Coast Guard school in Charleston, South Carolina

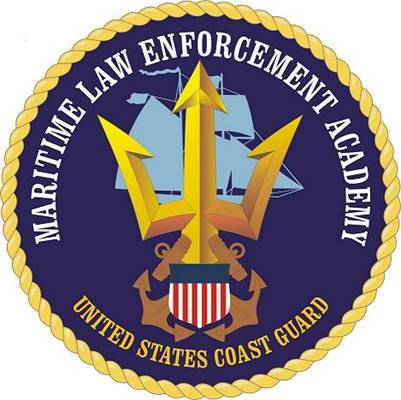
United States Coast Guard Reserve

The Maritime Law Enforcement Academy (MLEA) is a United States Coast Guard school located at the Federal Law Enforcement Training Center (FLETC) in Charleston, South Carolina. It was created from the relocation and merger of the former Law Enforcement School at Yorktown, Virginia, and the former Boarding Team Member School at Petaluma, California.

== Training ==
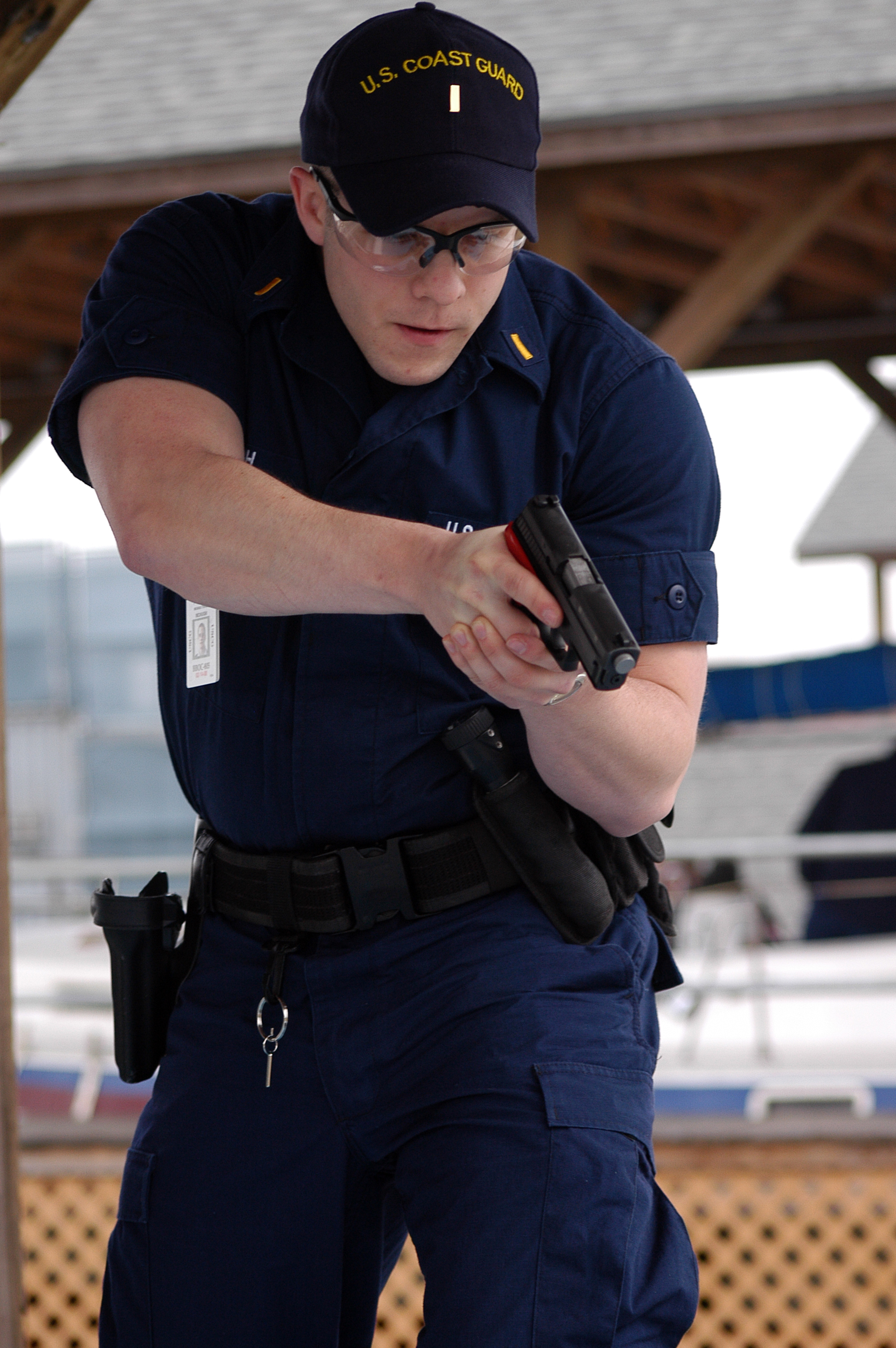
A boarding officer student conducts a mock boarding

Courses offered at the MLEA include:

- Boarding Officer Course (BOC): The purpose of the BOC is to prepare Boarding Officers for the arduous duties associated with enforcing laws and treaties at sea. The course consists of twenty three training days over five weeks and is open to U.S. Coast Guard personnel and foreign naval officers.
- Boarding Team Member (BTM) Course: The BTM course consists of nine training days over two weeks and trains Coast Guard personnel to serve as Boarding Team Members under the supervision of a Boarding Officer.
- Radiation Detection Level II Operators Course: This is a three-day course that prepares Coast Guard personnel to conduct radiation detection operations on board vessels and ashore.
- Ports, Waterways, and Coastal Security Course: This is a five-day program designed to provide boarding officers with the specific concepts and experience necessary to safely conduct Security Boardings and Law Enforcement Ashore at facilities in compliance with Coast Guard policy, U.S. law, and international treaties.

Training ranges from criminal law and the use of force to boarding team member certification to the use of radiation detection equipment. Much of the training is live, using handguns with laser inserts or firing simulation rounds.

The Academy is also home to the Maritime Enforcement Specialist "A" school.

== See also ==
- Joint Maritime Training Center
- Maritime Law Enforcement Specialist
