= Special Missions Training Center =

US military training facility on Camp Lejeune, North Carolina

Special Missions Training Center/Joint Maritime Training Center
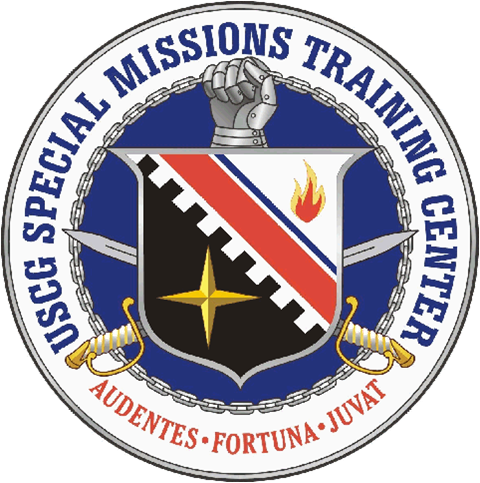
- Seal of Special Missions Training Center
- Country: United States of America
- Branch: United States Coast Guard United States Navy United States Marine Corps
- Role: Joint military maritime training and pre-deployment training
- Part of: Marine Corps Base Camp Lejeune
- Motto: Audentes Fortuna Juvat
- Website: Official website

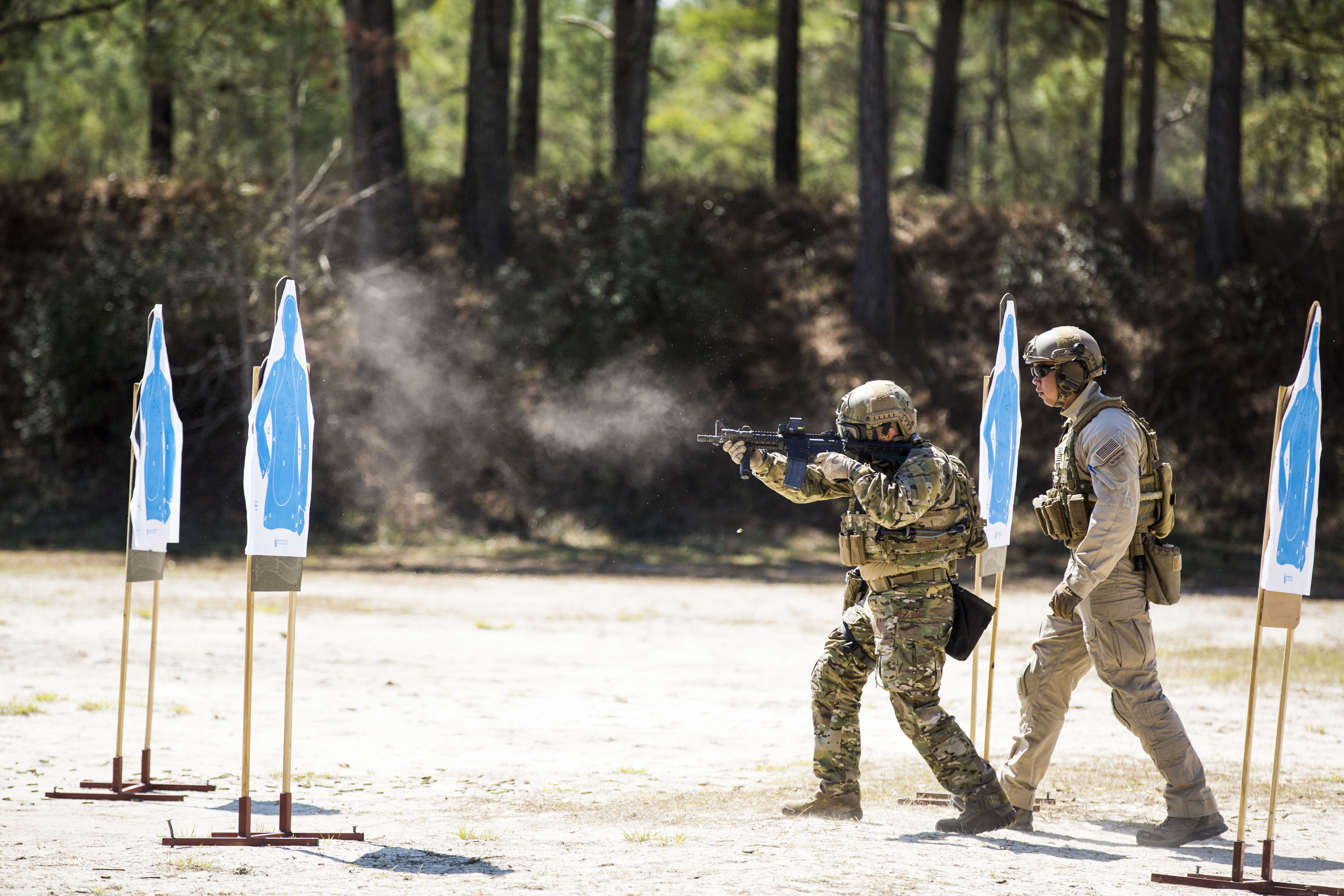
US Coast Guardsmen participate in Advanced Tactical Operations Course

The Special Missions Training Center (SMTC), also known as the Joint Maritime Training Center (JMTC), is a joint United States Coast Guard, Navy, and Marine Corps training facility located on Camp Lejeune, North Carolina.

SMTC's mission is to provide relevant and credible Maritime Security Training and Operational Testing and Evaluation in support of Department of Defense and Department of Homeland Security missions. SMTC comprises four main divisions: Weapons, Port Security, Engineering / Logistics, and Fast Boat.

== History ==
The origins of the Special Missions Training Center lie in the Coast Guard Deployable Specialized Forces (DSF), Port Security Unit Training Detachment (PSU TRADET). Originally located in Port Clinton, Ohio, the PSU TRADET was tasked with improving the mission effectiveness, unit readiness, and providing pre-deployment support for the Coast Guard PSU's.

In November 1998 PSU TRADET relocated to Marine Corps Base Camp Lejeune, North Carolina and by the summer of 2001 its mission had expanded to include non-lethal weapons and the Fast Boat Center of Excellence, as well as conducting training for cutter small boats over-the-horizon tactics designed to enhance interdiction abilities in counter narcotics operations. After the terrorist attacks of 11 September 2001, the PSU TRADET began training the newly created Coast Guard Maritime Safety and Security Teams (MSSTs).

The unit grew and evolved to accommodate the broadened responsibilities and growing inter-agency and international training requests. In August 2002, the name of the command changed to Coast Guard Special Missions Training Center (SMTC) to better incorporate its multi-faceted capabilities. SMTC was commissioned as a Headquarters unit on 29 July 2003.

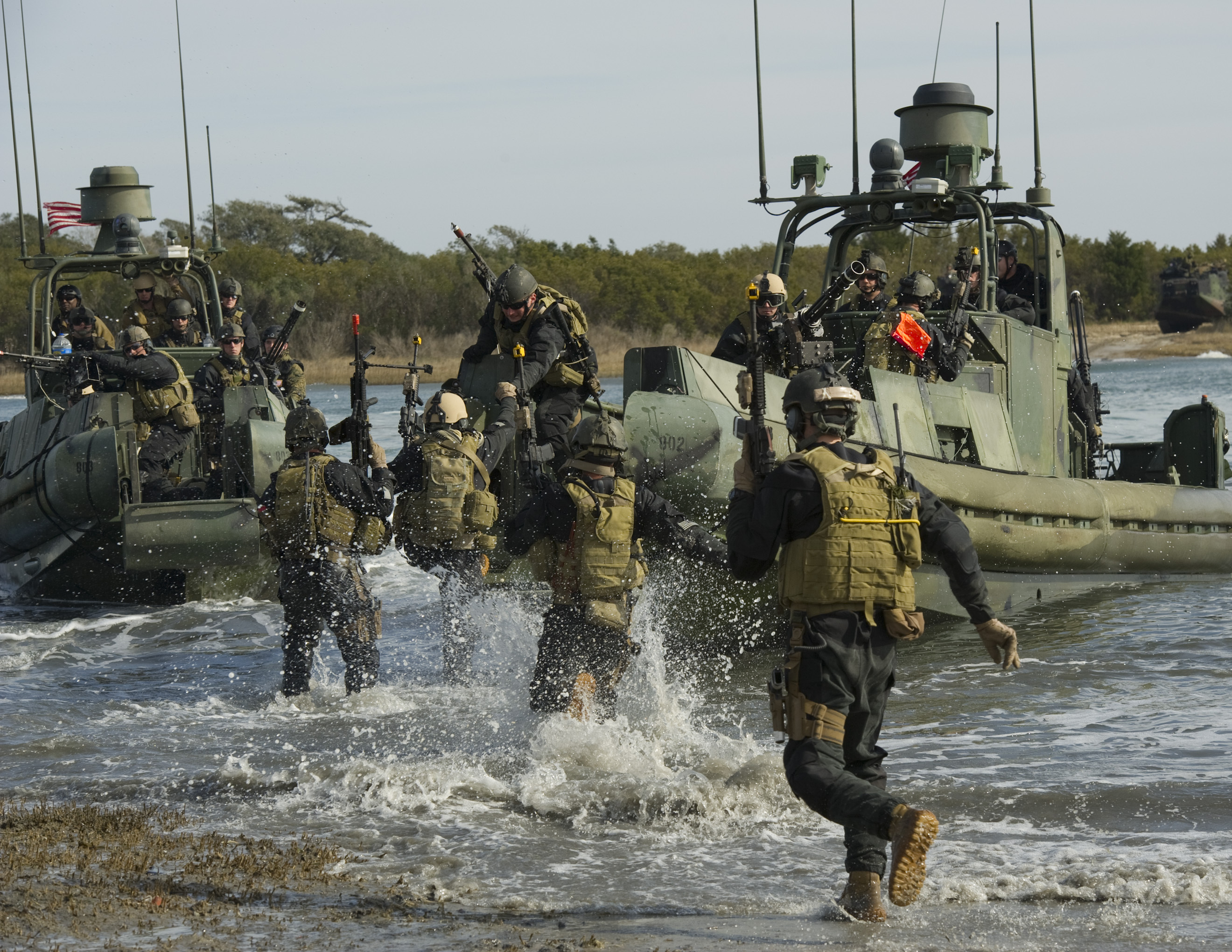
Sailors aboard riverine assault boats execute a hot extract

In 2003, the U.S. Navy established a training detachment within SMTC to train Mobile Security Force (MSF) personnel as Tactical Coxswains and Crewmen, and in 2004 added crew served weapons training. The Marine Corps also established a small boat training detachment (SBTD) to support USMC operational requirements. In 2006, the NAVDET and MARDET commenced a two-year training surge for the Navy's new Naval Expeditionary Combat Command (NECC) Riverine Forces.

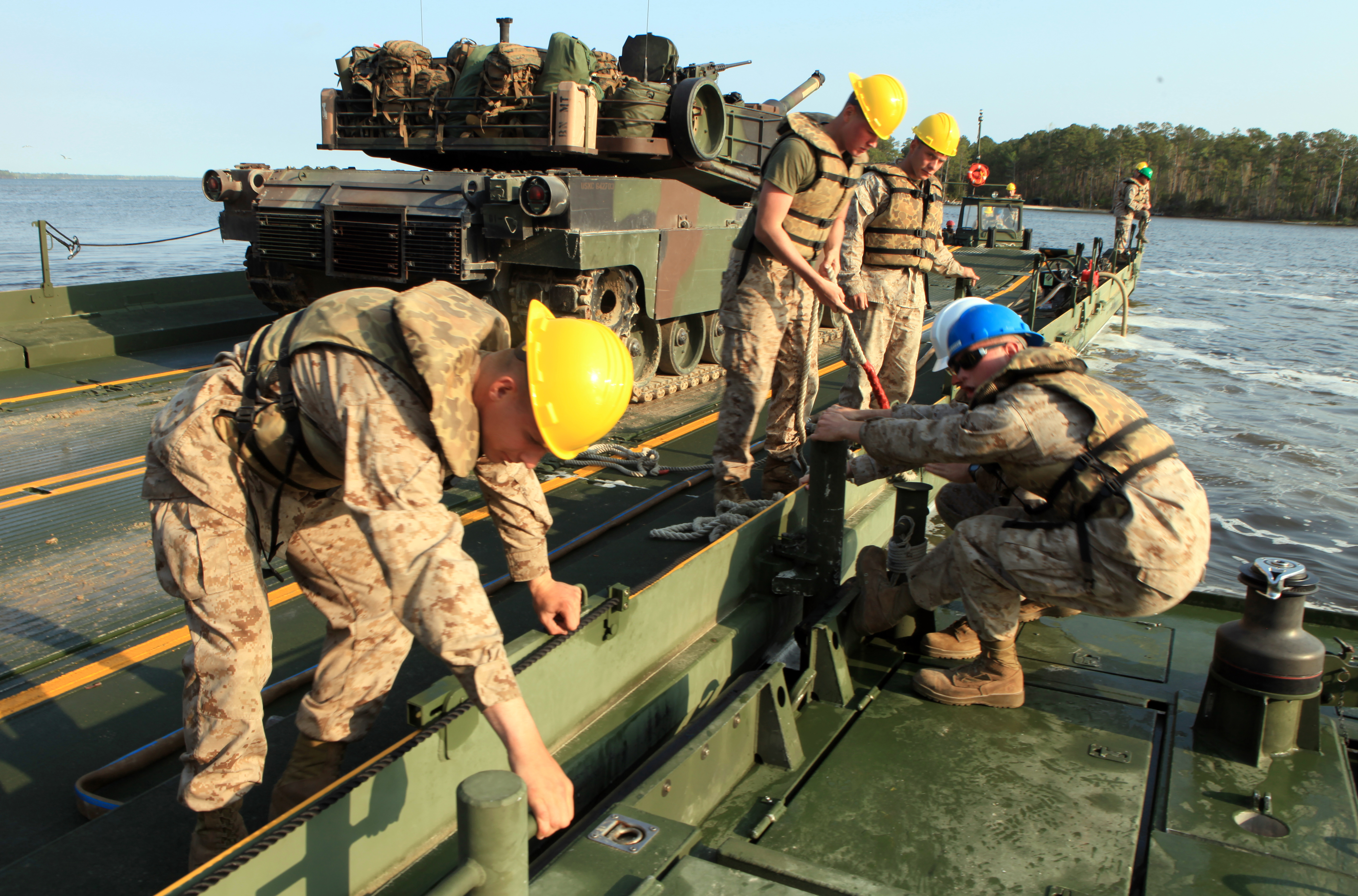
Marines with 8th Engineer Support Battalion, 2nd Marine Logistics Group tie a MKIII Bridge Erection Boat to the side of a raft during an operation at JMTC

In 2008, SMTC completed the move to four new buildings within Courthouse Bay, and the unit was renamed for the second time as the Joint Maritime Training Center (JMTC) to more accurately reflect the unit's diverse range of multi-service military personnel and training center.

Currently, Coast Guard DSF members and select specialized Navy units attend training at Special Missions Training Center. All Coast Guardsmen who have been selected to serve in the Middle East in support of Patrol Forces Southwest Asia and Operation Inherent Resolve also attend pre-deployment training at SMTC.

== Training ==
=== Coast Guard courses ===
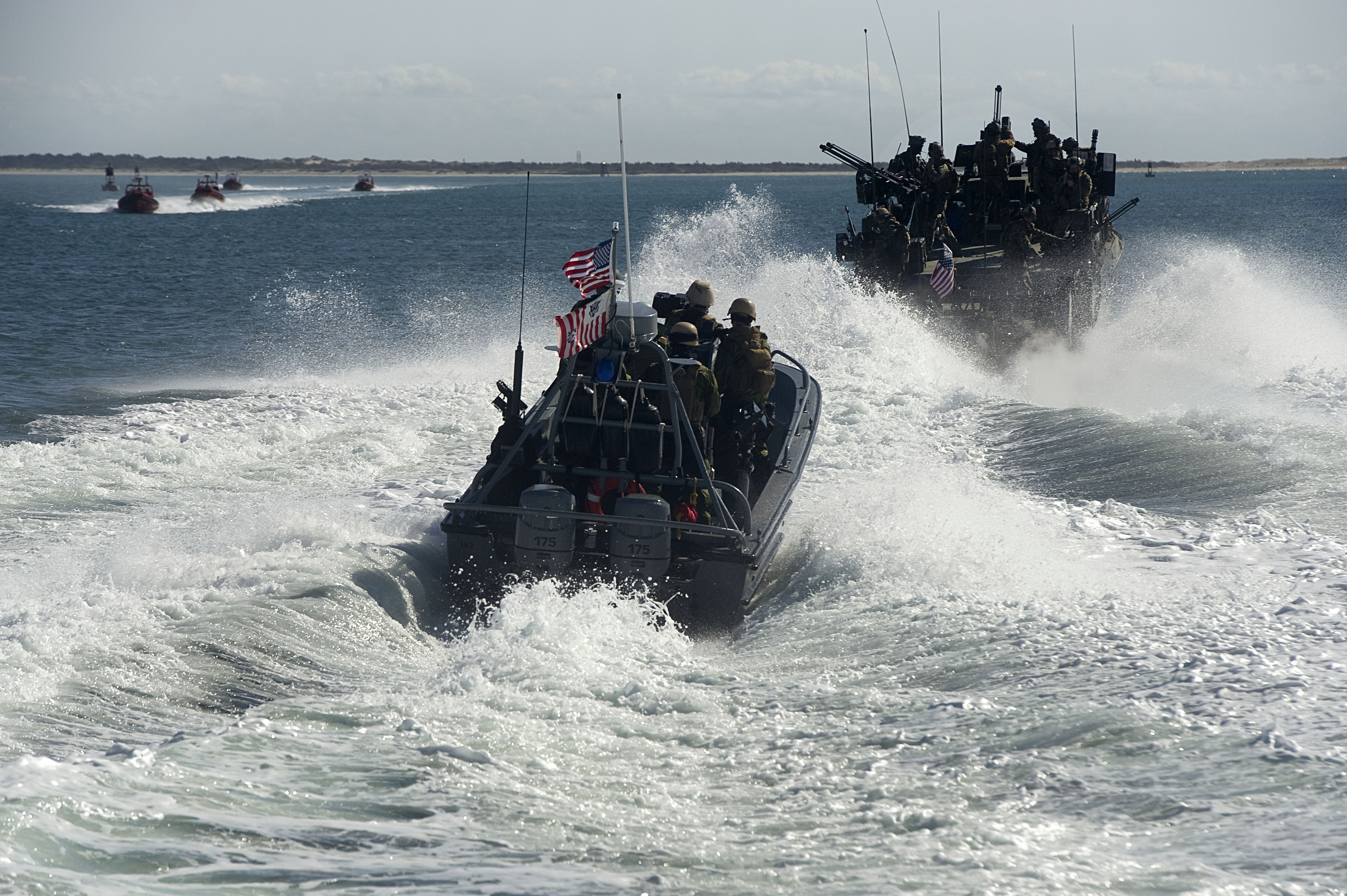
Coast Guard transportable Port Security Unit 308 and Navy riverine command boats used by Special warfare boat operators conduct training at SMTC

- Non-Compliant Vessel Pursuit Course (NCVP)
- Port Security Unit Basic Skills Course
- Opposing Force Tactical Coxswain Course (OPFOR)
- Tactical Coxswain Course (TCC)
- Tactical Boat Crew Member Course (TBCM)
- Tactical Bow Gunner Course (TBGC)
- Crew-served weapon, Mk 19, 40mm Machine Gun Course
- Basic Tactical Operations Course (BTOC)
- Close Quarters Combat Instructor (CQCI)
- Advanced Tactical Operations Course
- Advanced Marksmanship Instructor Course (AMI)
- Precision Marksman Course (PMC)
- Precision Marksman Instructor (PMI)

=== Navy courses ===
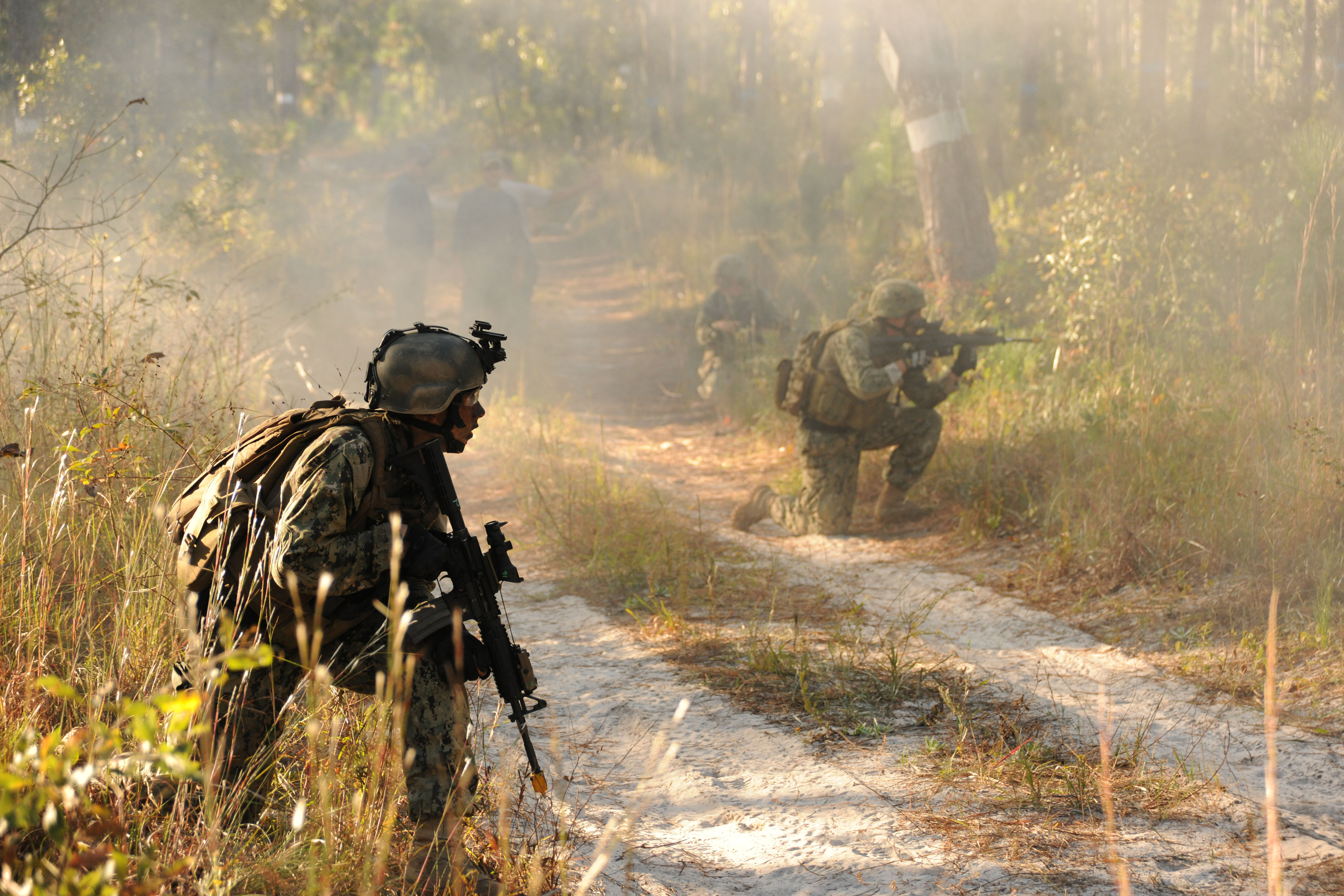
Sailors conduct land missions

- Riverine Combat Skills Course (RCS)
- Riverine Crewman Course (RCC)
- Riverine Unit Level Leaders Course (RULL)
- Riverine Security Team Trainer (RSTT)

=== Marine Corps courses ===
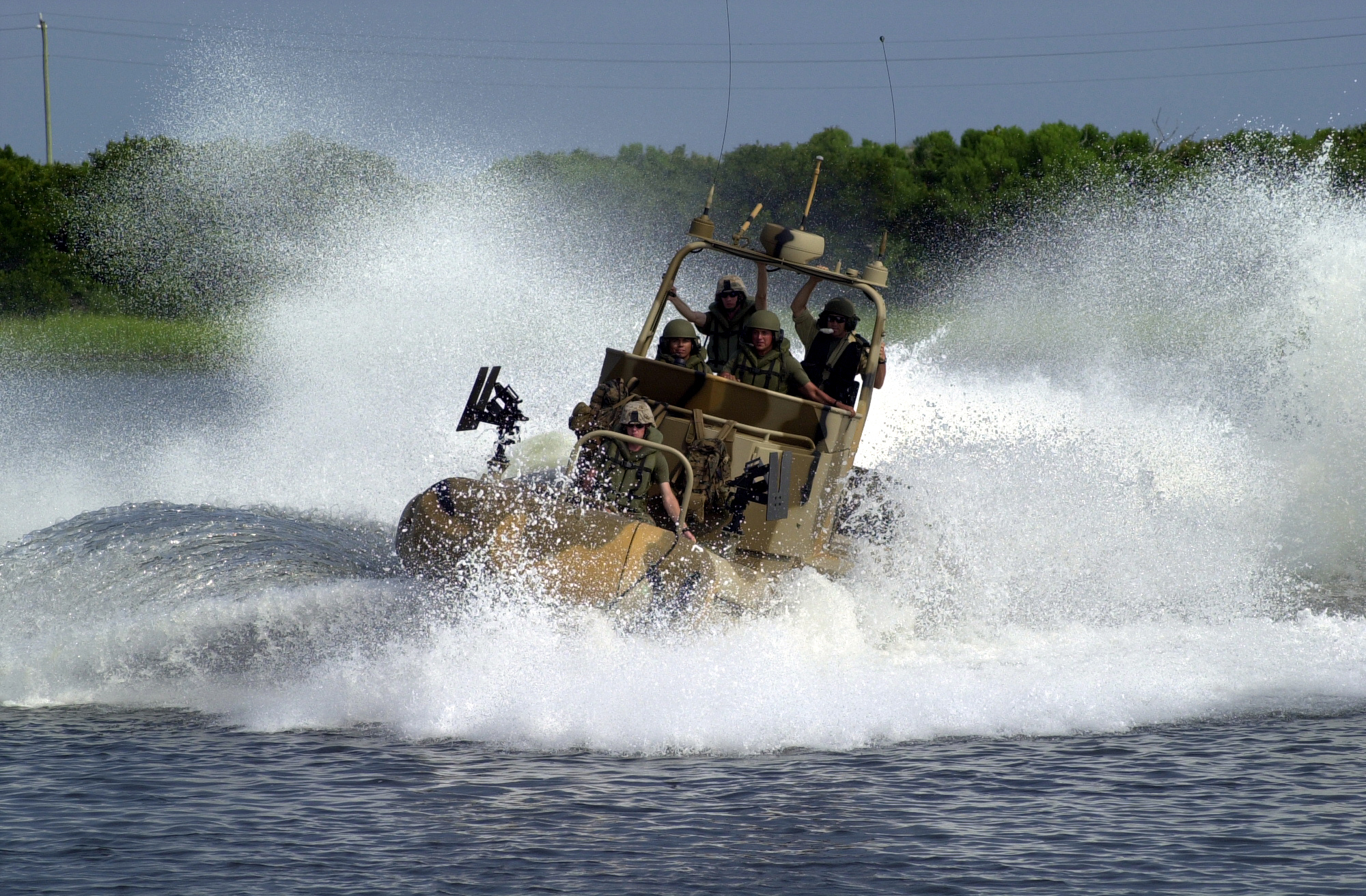
Marines undergoing the Small boat Coxswain Course at SMTC

- Small Craft Mechanics Course (SCMC)
- Combat Rubber Reconnaissance Craft Repair Course (CRRC-RC)
- Small Boat Detachment Maneuvers Course

== Divisions ==
=== Weapons Division ===
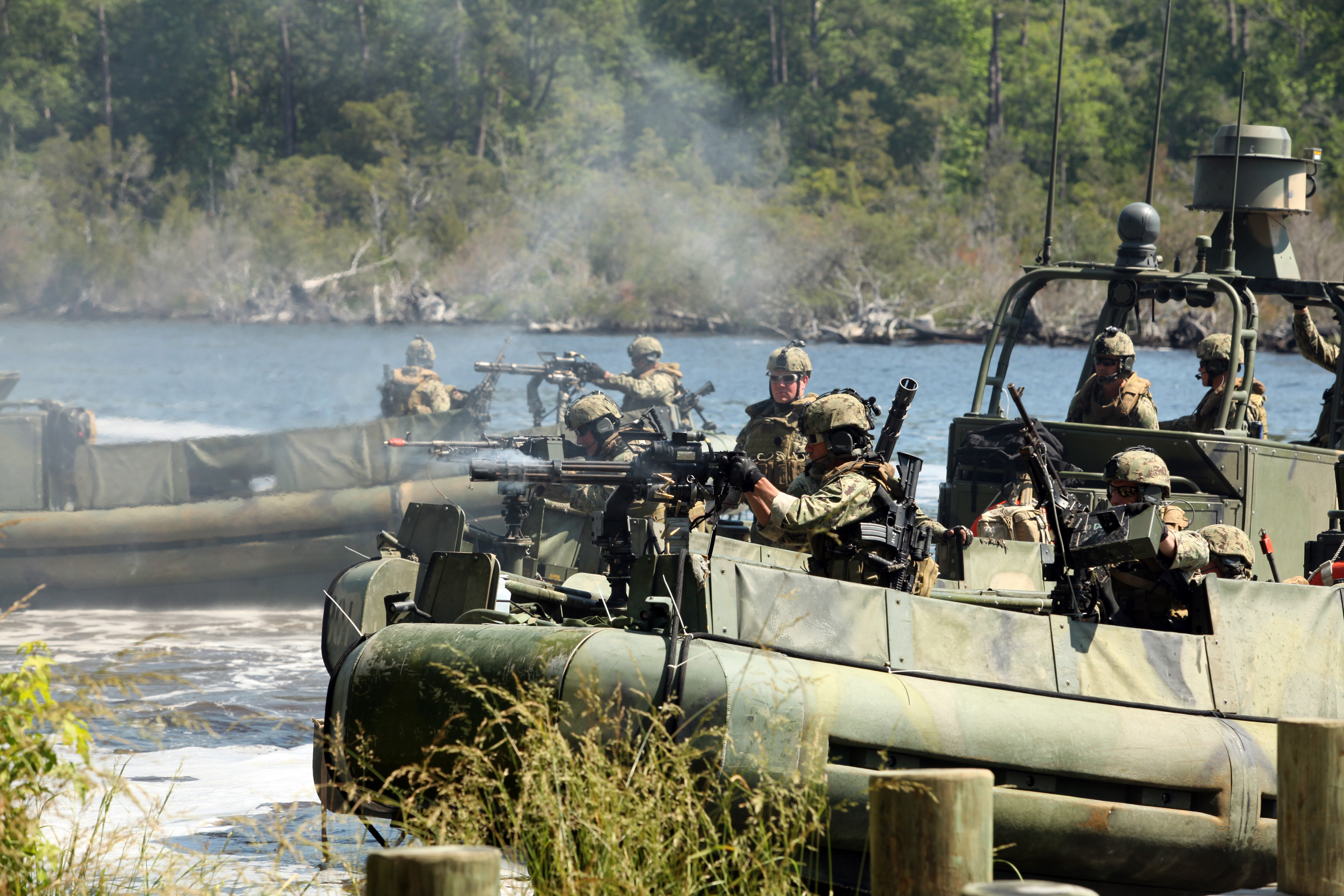
Navy boat operators conduct extraction training for U.S. Marines ground combat element

The Weapons Division is responsible for providing less-lethal weapons testing for the US Coast Guard. The Weapons Division identifies, tests, evaluates and develops tactics, techniques and procedures for maritime delivered weapons technologies. Additionally, the Weapons Division provides weapons training and support to both Fast Boat and Port Security Divisions. Training includes various service small arms, such as the M240B, M2 Browning machine gun and the Mk 19 grenade launcher crew-served weapons system. JMTC also operates Fire Arms Training Simulator IV (FATS), which supports crew served weapons training and tactics development.

=== Port Security Division ===
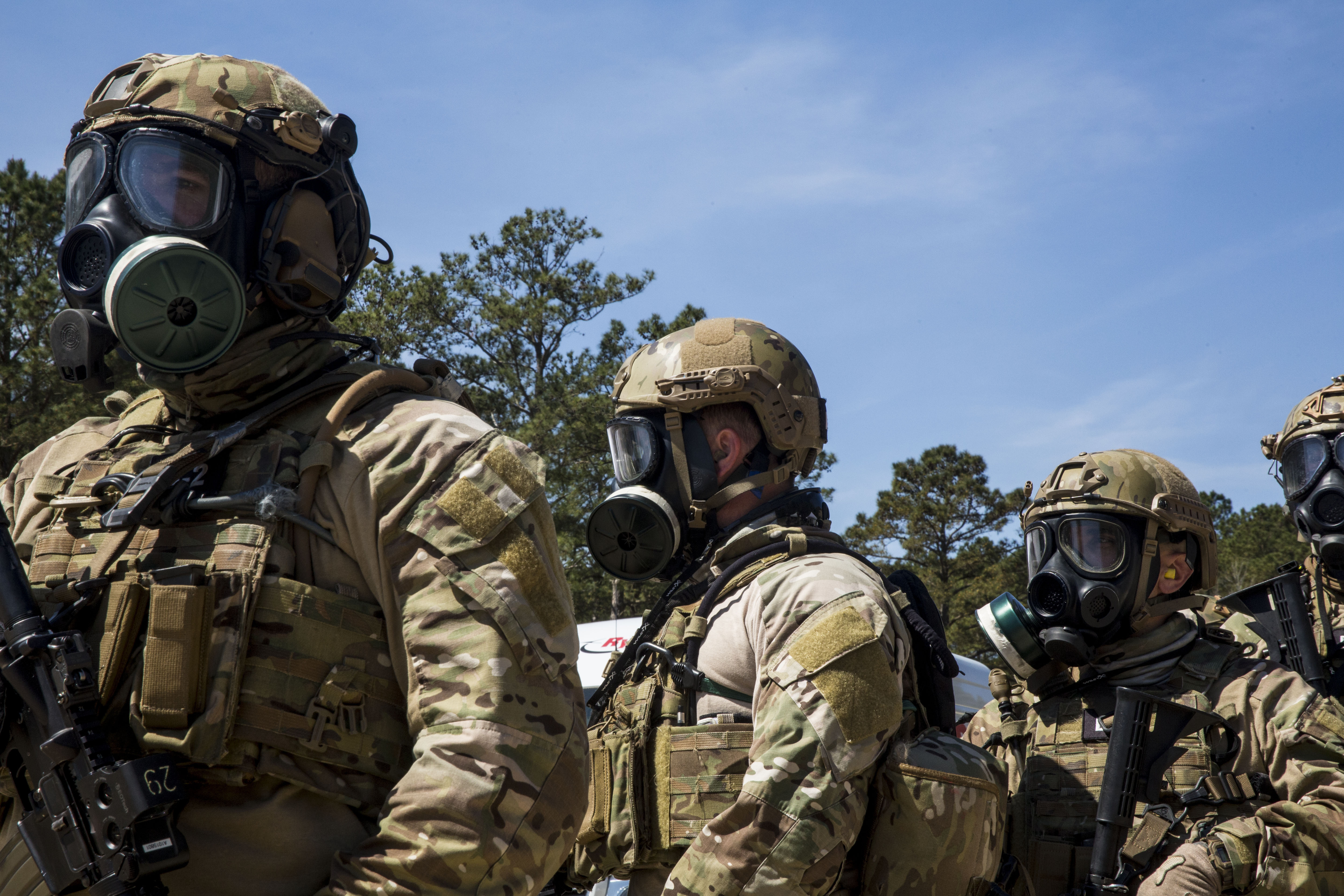
Advanced Tactical Operations Course CBRNE training

The Port Security Division provides Port Security Unit (PSU) and Maritime Safety and Security Team (MSST) training in counter-terrorism and force protection tactics, techniques, and procedures. Courses include chemical, biological, and radiological, Explosive defense, basic combat skills courses, pier and vehicle searches, and military operations in urban terrain (MOUT). The Port Security Division also maintains a group of cultural guides and charts, maps, imagery and publications of strategic ports worldwide.

=== Engineering/Logistics Division ===
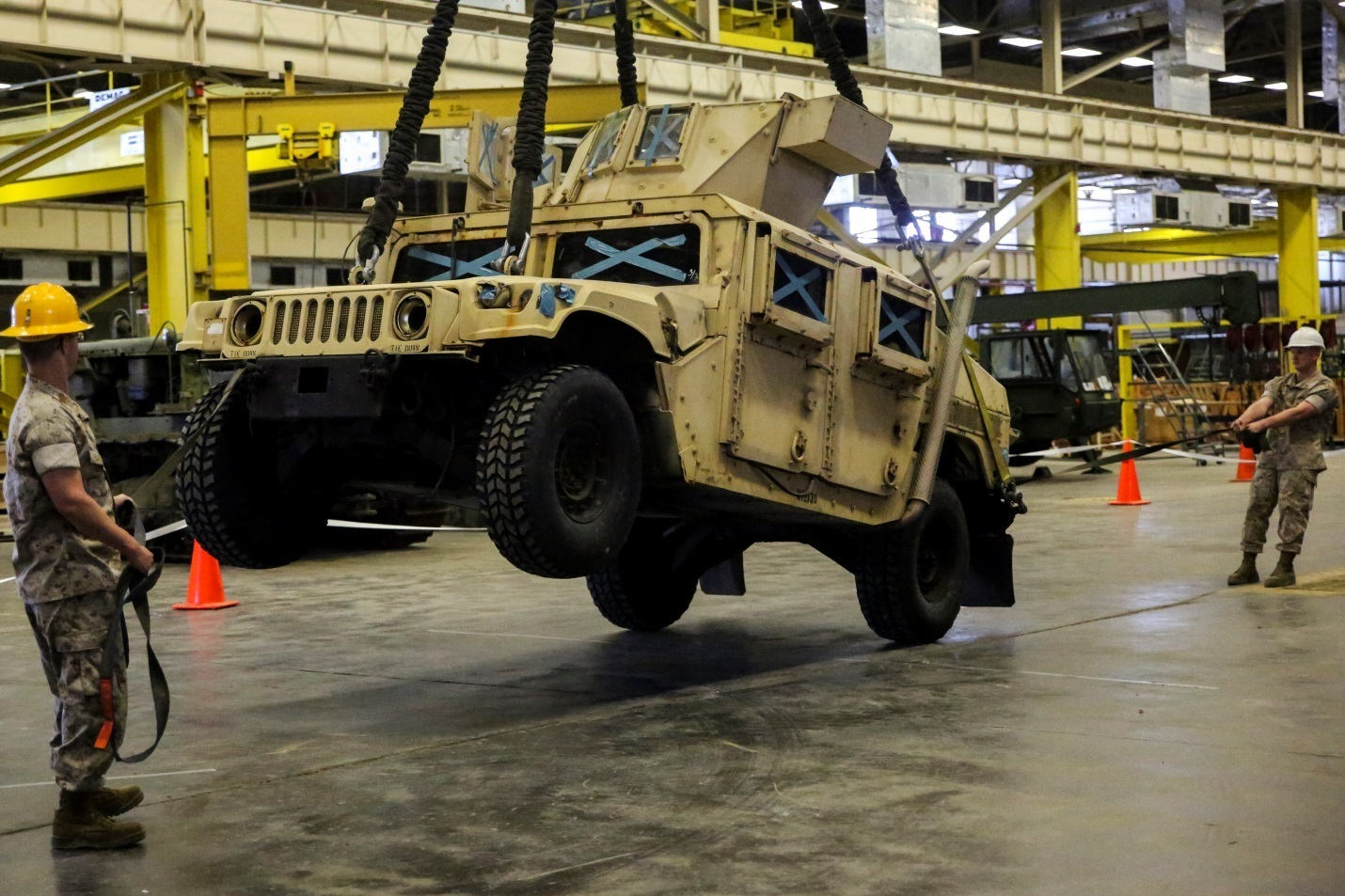
Marines with 2nd Maintenance Battalion at JMTC

The Logistics Department, part of the Engineering and Logistics Division, provides the support, supplies and maintenance for all activities at JMTC. Procurement and contracting are done through various sources including those used by Marine Corps Base Camp Lejeune as well as UNICOR, General Services Administration and commercial vendors. The Engineering Division handles all of the aspects of the vehicle and boat maintenance from routine preventative maintenance to ordering parts for vehicles used during training.

=== Fast Boat Division ===
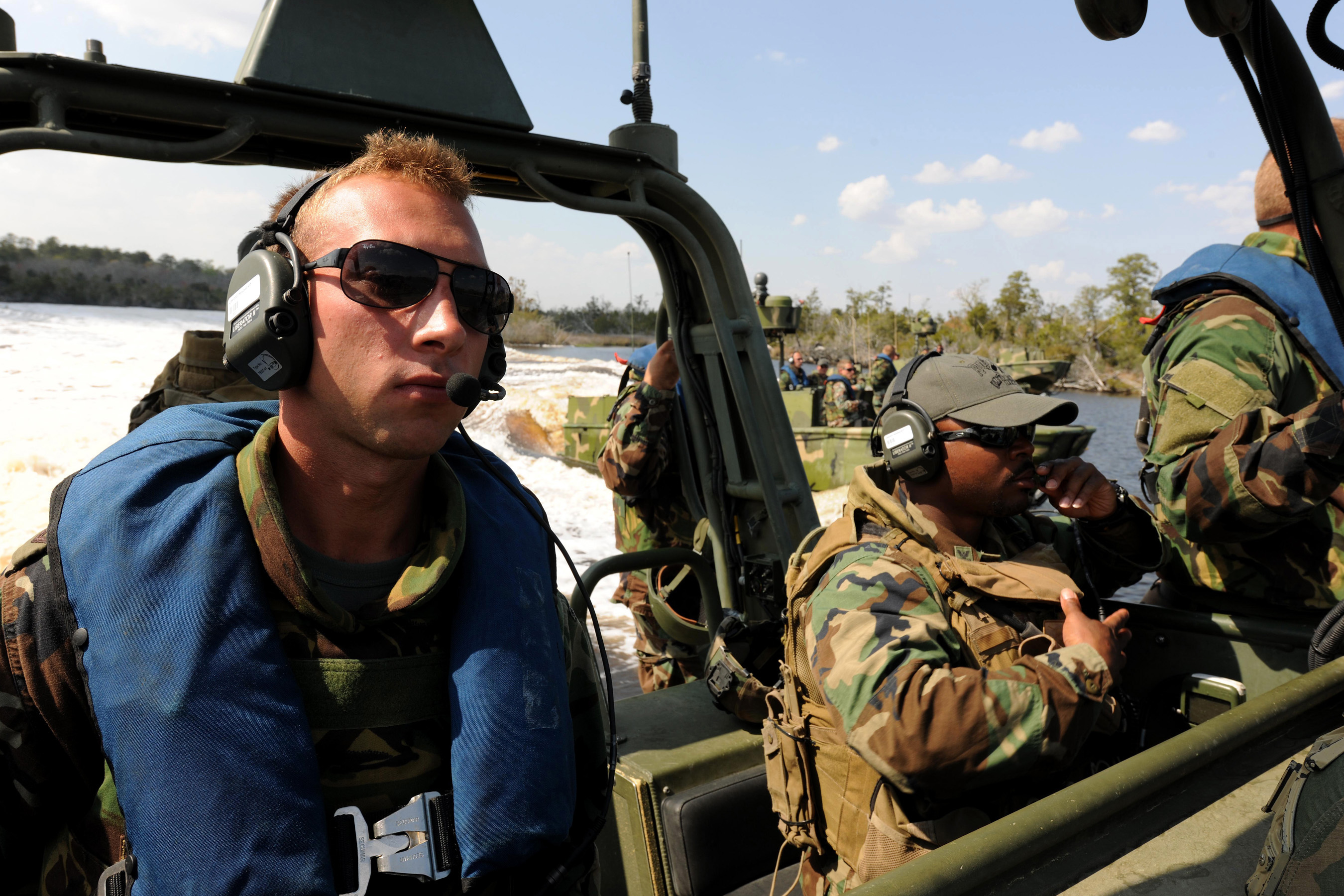
US Navy assigned to Riverine Squadron 3, calls out formation orders over the radio to marines from the Royal Netherlands marine corps during riverine combat boat maneuver drills during a three-week cross-training exercise

The Fast Boat Division provides standardized, safe and relevant fast boat tactics and training to U.S. and foreign forces. Inherent in this mission is the requirement for knowledgeable instructors, who maintain proficiency in the most up-to-date fast boat tactics, techniques and procedures for all US Coast Guard, US Navy, and US Marine Corps small boats. Within the Fast Boat Division, there are two sections: the Tactical Coxswain section, which instructs Marine Special operations capable personnel, Navy Mobile Security Forces (NMSF), Maritime Special Purpose Force, Maritime Safety and Security Teams (MSST), and Port Security Unit (PSU) coxswains, and the Cutter Boat Over-the-Horizon (CB-OTH) section, which teaches counter-narcotic operations to the cutter fleet.

== See also ==
- Deployable Specialized Forces
- Maritime Law Enforcement Academy
- Maritime Law Enforcement Specialist
- Maritime Special Purpose Force
- Marine Forces Special Operations Command (MARSOC)
- Naval Small Craft Instruction and Technical Training School (NAVSCIATTS)

== Notes ==
- FATS (Firearms Training Simulator)
