= Maritime Safety and Security Team =

Counter-terrorism team of US Coast Guard

United States Coast Guard Maritime Safety and Security Team (MSST) emblem

A Maritime Safety and Security Team (MSST) is a counter-terrorism team of the United States Coast Guard established to protect local maritime assets. It is also a harbor and inshore patrol and security team that includes detecting and, if necessary, stopping or arresting submerged divers, using the Underwater Port Security System.

MSSTs were created under the Maritime Transportation Security Act of 2002 (MTSA) in direct response to the terrorist attacks on September 11, 2001, and they are a part of the United States Department of Homeland Security's layered strategy directed at protecting seaports and waterways. MSSTs provide waterborne and a modest level of shore-side counter-terrorism force protection for strategic shipping, high interest vessels, and critical infrastructure. MSSTs are a quick response force capable of rapid nationwide deployment via air, ground or sea transportation in response to changing threat conditions and evolving Maritime Homeland Security (MHS) mission requirements. Multi-mission capability facilitates augmentation for other selected Coast Guard missions.

MSST personnel receive training in Advanced Tactical Boat Operations and counter-terrorism force protection at the Special Missions Training Center at Camp Lejeune, North Carolina.

== Mission ==
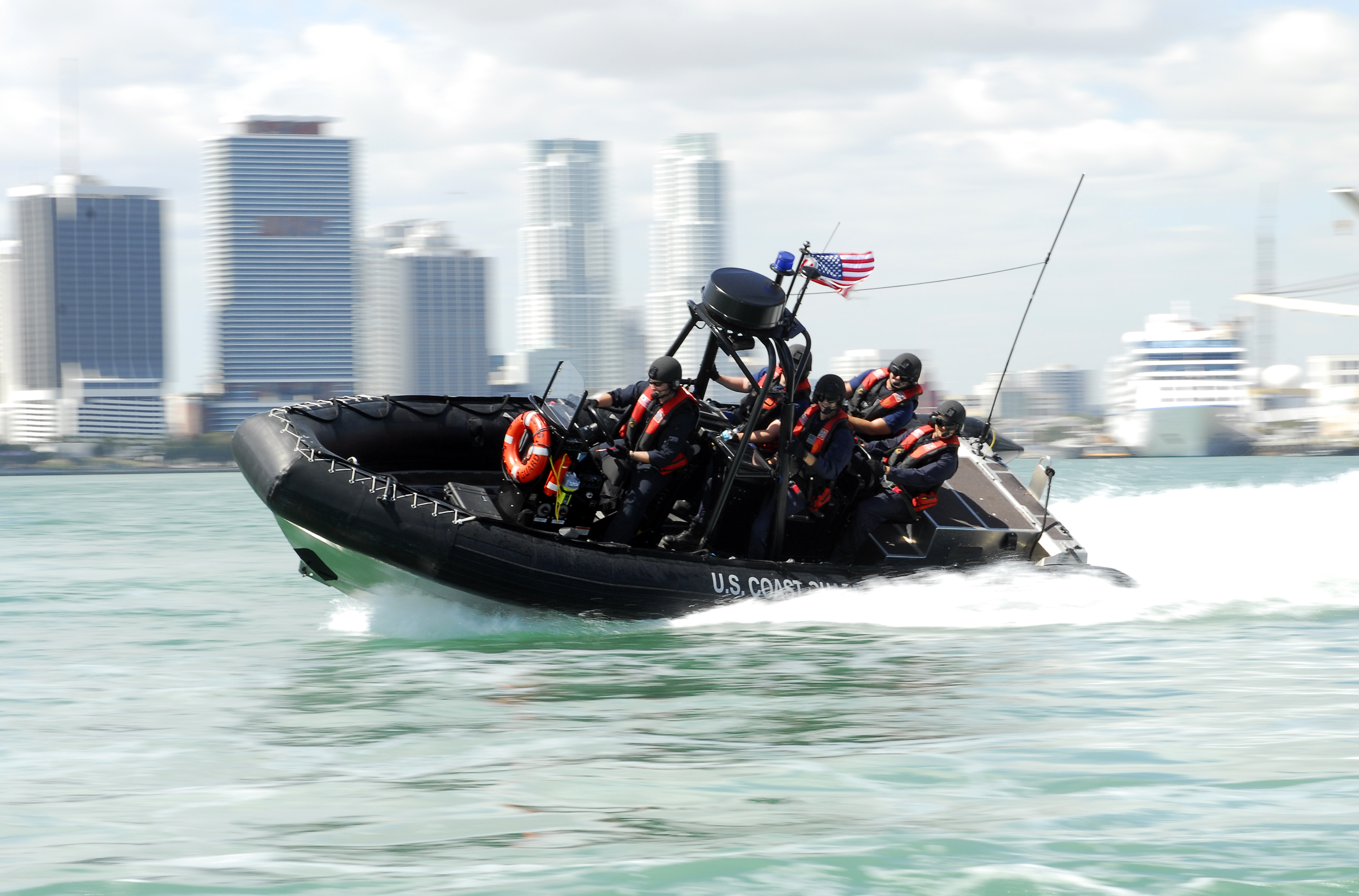
A boatcrew from Coast Guard Maritime Safety and Security Team 91114 conducts high-speed maneuvers during a security patrol south of the Port of Miami

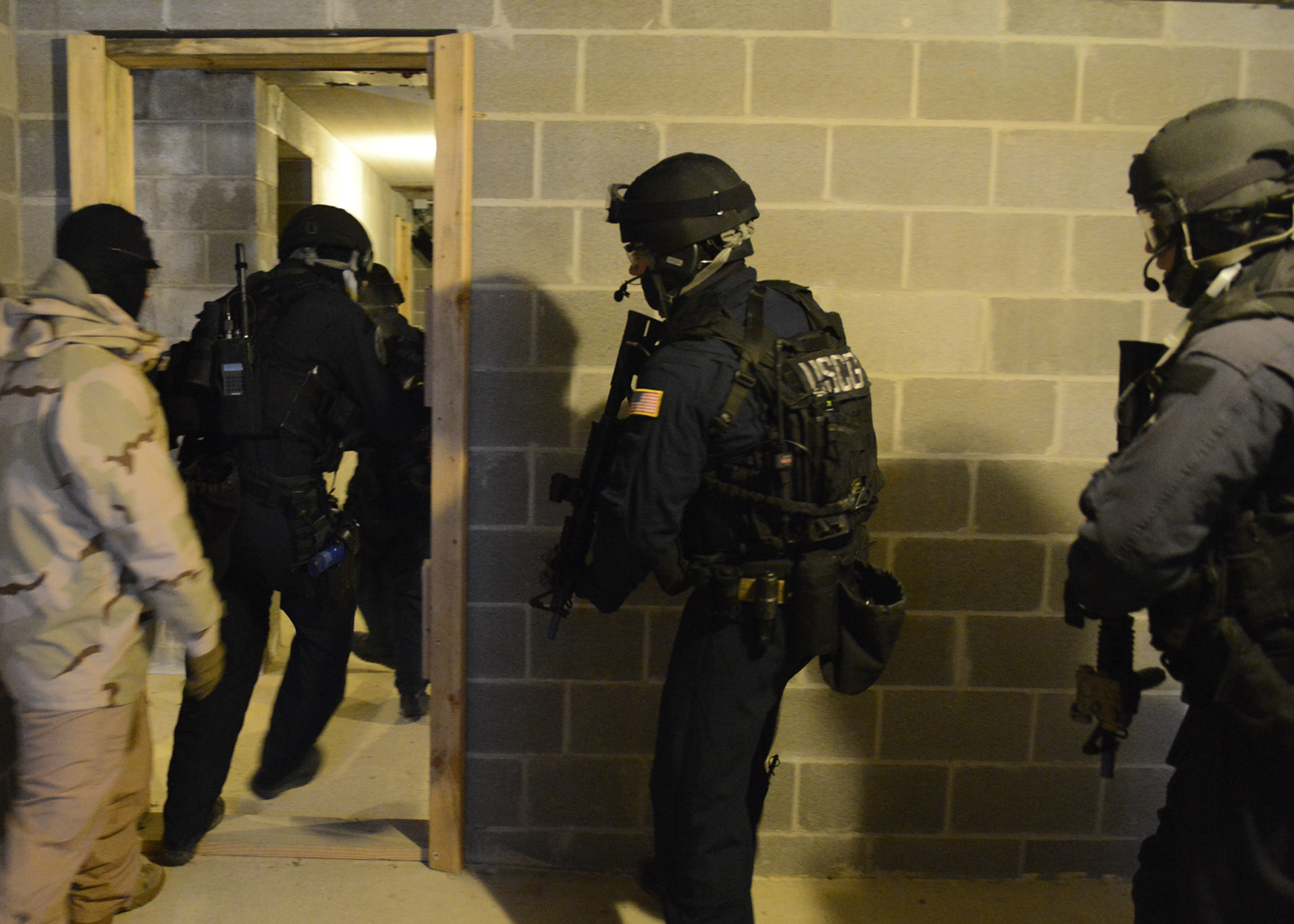
Coast Guard tactical CQB training

Modeled after the Port Security Unit (PSU) and Law Enforcement Detachment (LEDET) programs, MSSTs provide a complementary non-redundant capability designed to close critical security gaps in United States strategic seaports. MSSTs are staffed to support continuous law enforcement operations both ashore and afloat. In addition, MSSTs:

- Jointly staffed to maximize effectiveness executing Port, Waterways, and Coastal Security (PWCS) operations (enforce security zones, port state control boarding, protection of military out-loads and major marine events, augment shore-side security at waterfront facilities, detect WMD weapons/agents, and participate in port level counter-terrorism exercises).
- Provide enhanced port safety and security and law enforcement capabilities to the economic or military significant port where they are based.
- Deploy in support of National Special Security Events (NSSEs) requiring Coast Guard presence, such as OpSail, Olympics, Republican and Democratic national conventions, major disasters or storm recovery operations.
- Prototype/employ specialized capabilities to enhance mission performance (K-9 program, radiation detectors, dive program, vertical insertion, running gear entangling systems, less-than-lethal weapons, etc.).
- Deploy on board cutters and other naval vessels for port safety and security, drug law enforcement, migrant interdiction, or other maritime homeland security mission requirements.
- Support Naval Coastal Warfare requirements during Homeland Defense (HLD) and in accordance with long standing agreements with DOD and the Combatant Commanders (protect strategic shipping, major naval combatants and critical infrastructure at home and abroad)

== Capabilities ==
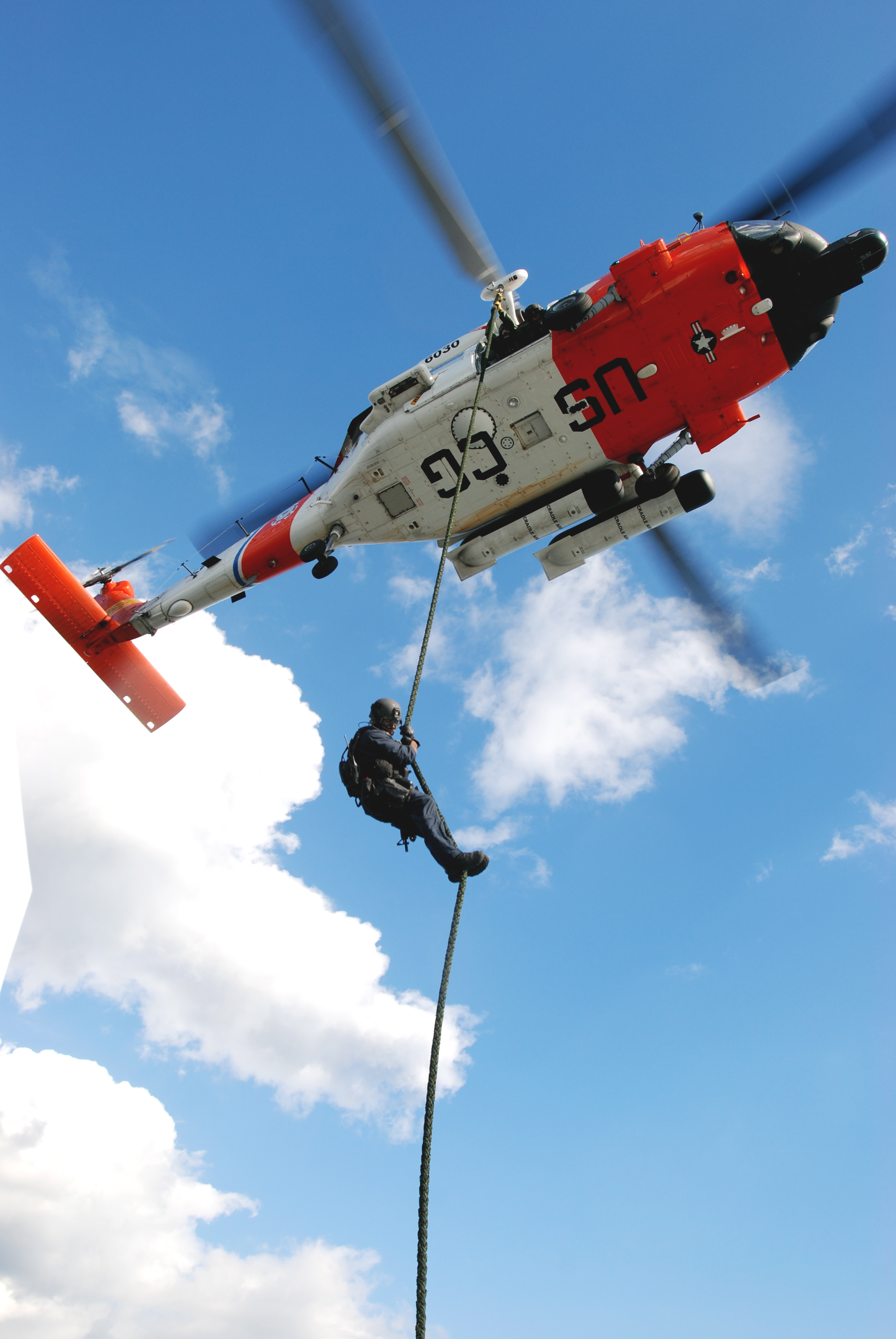
A Maritime Safety and Security Team member conducts a vertical insertion from an HH-60 Jayhawk helicopter

Capabilities

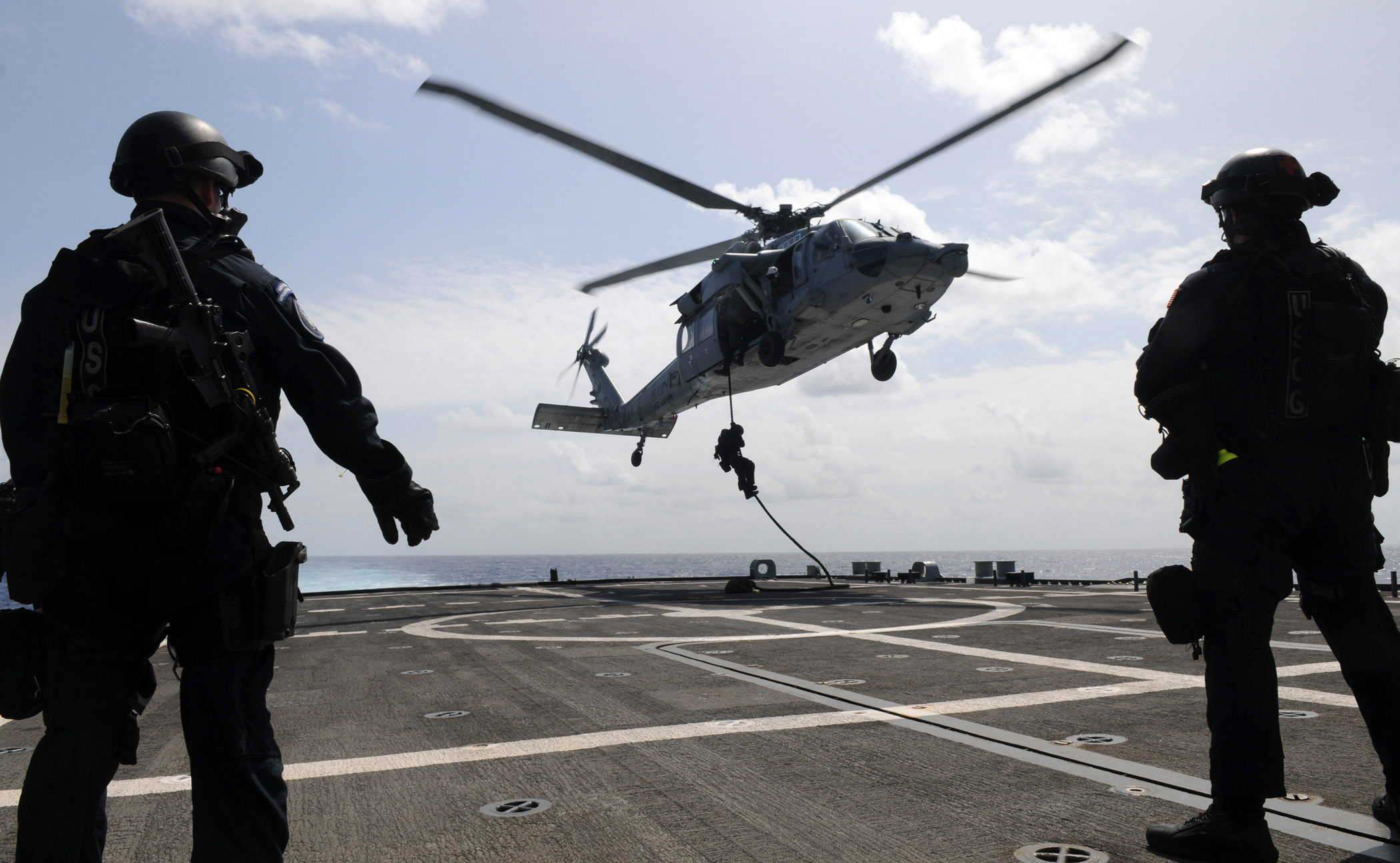
U.S. Coast Guard's MSST fast-ropes onto the flight deck of USS Freedom (LCS 1)

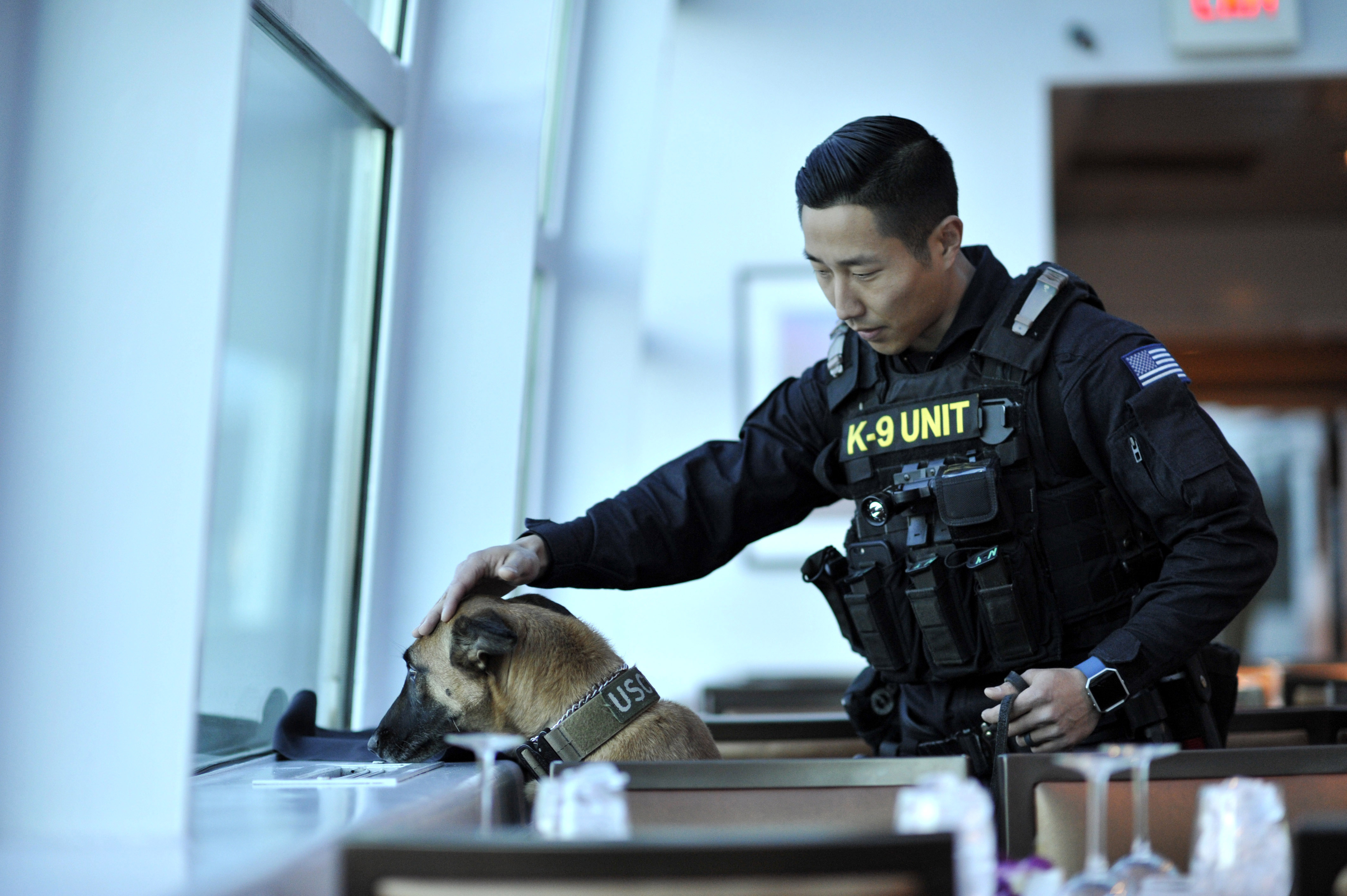
Coast Guard MSST K-9 team supports the 58th Presidential Inauguration security

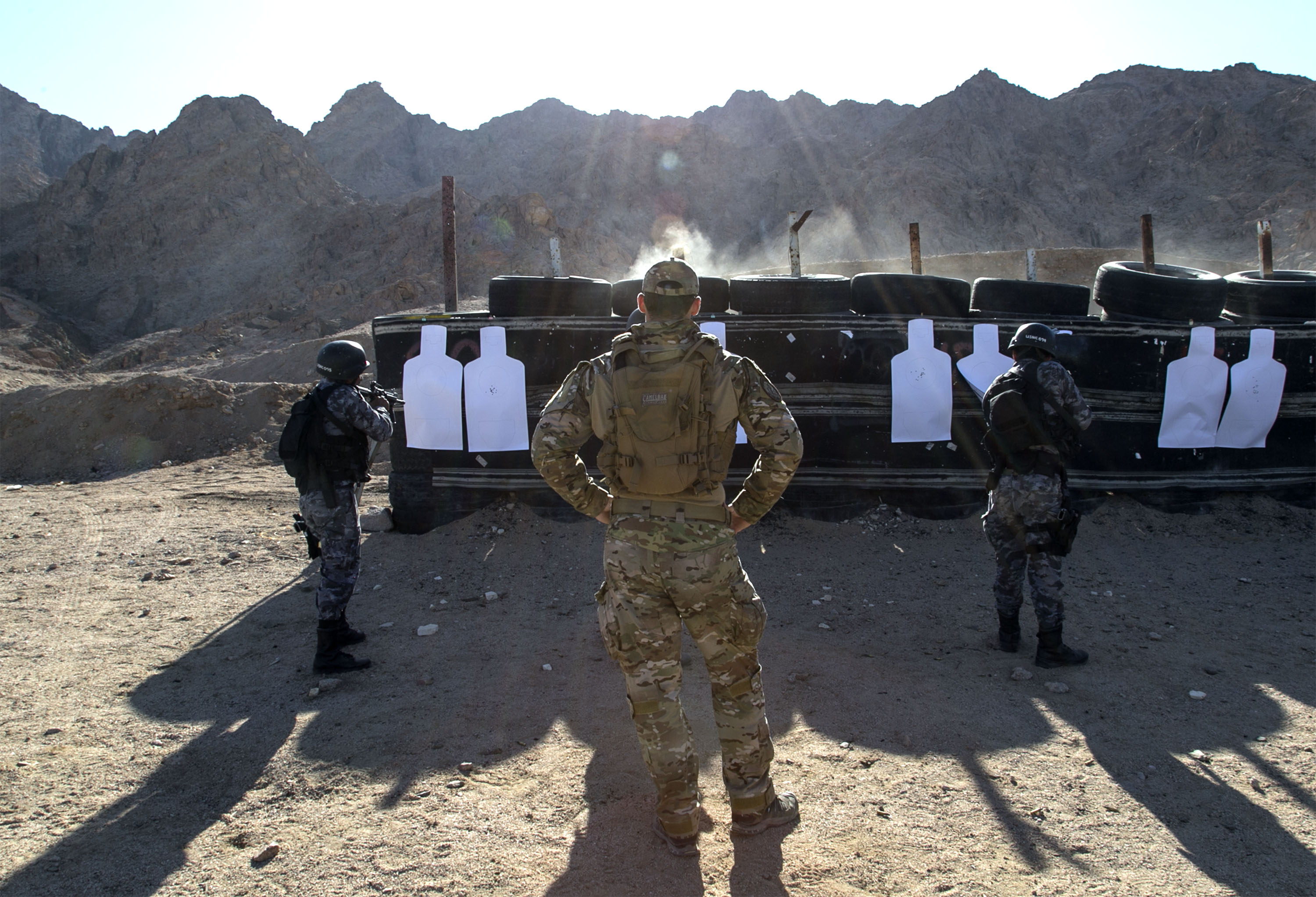
A MSRT member trains with Royal Jordanian Marines
- Maritime interdiction and law enforcement
- Security detail
- Counter-terrorism/Force Protection
- Visit, Board, Search and Seizure
- CBRN-E Detection
- Search and Rescue (limited)
- Port Protection/Anti-sabotage
- Underwater Port Security
- Canine Handling Teams (Explosive detection)
- Tactical Boat Operations
- Non-compliant boarding operations

== Commissioning schedule ==
- MSST 91101 -- Seattle (Established 2002)
- MSST 91102 -- Chesapeake, Va. (Established 2002. Merged with TACLET North in 2004 to form the prototype Enhanced Maritime Safety and Security Team - "EMSST" which, in 2006, was finally named the Maritime Security Response Team - "MSRT;" the Coast Guard's only high-risk/counter-terrorism unit)
- MSST 91103 -- Los Angeles/Long Beach (Established 2002)
- MSST 91104 -- Houston/Galveston (Established 2002)
- MSST 91105 -- San Francisco (Established 2003)
- MSST 91106 -- Fort Wadsworth, Staten Island, NY (Established 2003)
- MSST 91107 -- Honolulu, HI (Established 2005)
- MSST 91108 -- St. Marys, Georgia (Naval Submarine Base Kings Bay) (Established 2003)
- MSST 91109 -- San Diego, CA (Established 2005) (transitioned into MSRT West in 2016, the Coast Guard' 2nd high-risk/counter-terrorism unit, also parent command of all Coast Guard dive lockers)
- MSST 91110 -- Cape Cod, MA (Boston Established 2003 relocation in 2018)
- MSST 91111 -- Anchorage, Alaska (Established 2004) (Disassembled 2011)
- MSST 91112 -- New Orleans (Established 2004)
- MSST 91114 -- Miami, FL (Established 2005)

== See also ==
- Law Enforcement Detachments
- Port Security Unit
