= The Soldiers (TV program) =

South Korean reality television show

- Promotional poster
- Hangul: 더솔져스
- RR: Deosoljeoseu
- MR: Tŏsoljŏsŭ
- Genre: Reality television; Military
- Created by: Park Jae-yong
- Written by: Lee Min-jung; Kim Min-ji; Yang Gyu-ok; Lee Soo-min; Kwon Yeo-reum
- Presented by: Kim Sang-joong
- Music by: Jo Young-joon
- Country of origin: South Korea
- Original language: Korean
- No. of episodes: 10

Production
- Executive producers: Sung Gi-hoon; Min Sun-hong (CP)
- Producers: Cha Min-young; Son Ji-young; Kim Hak-sung; Choi Jun-hwan; Hong Deok-hwan; Shin Jun-ho
- Editor: Han Gwang-man
- Running time: 75 minutes
- Production company: New Button

Original release
- Network: SBS TV
- Release: November 19, 2021 – January 28, 2022

The Soldiers (Korean: 더솔져스) is a South Korean military-themed reality television show. The show seeks to find the "best special forces operator in the world," beginning with selecting the best Korean special forces representatives through a series of missions. Twenty male South Korean reservists who served in various special forces units of the Republic of Korea Armed Forces competed on the show. The cast also includes four former special forces operators from the United Kingdom, Sweden, the United States and South Korea who serve as mentors and later team leaders to the participants.

The show aired on SBS TV from November 19, 2021, to January 28, 2022, every Friday at 23:10 (KST). Longer, uncut versions of each episode were released the following Wednesday at 18:00 (KST) on the YouTube channel "뉴띵 NDD".

In the first episode, the show was explained as a three-season project:

- Season 1: select the best team of South Korean special forces reservists
- Season 2: compete with national representative teams across Asia-Pacific
- Season 3: find the strongest team across the globe

The survival program has been compared by media and viewers to Steel Troops, which has a similar special forces premise and aired its first season half a year earlier. In response to the comparison, show host Kim Sang-joong said that "[The Soldiers] is more upgraded and entertaining, with more intense missions." Show producer Gi Sang-soo also asserted that The Soldiers is "the first television program of its kind," with its global focus bearing the largest distinction.

== Cast ==
=== Host and mentors ===
Role	Name	Nationality	Military background
Host	Kim Sang-joong	South Korea	ROK Marine Corps (Discharged as Byeongjang/Sergeant)
Mentor	Jay Morton	United Kingdom	British Army Special Air Service (SAS), 10 years Former cast of SAS: Who Dares Wins
Mentor	Johan Reispass	Sweden	Swedish Armed Forces Special Operations Task Group (SOG), 17 years Former cast of Elitstyrkans Hemligheter
Mentor	Wilrolan "Wil" Ravelo	United States	US Army Special Forces (Green Berets), 13 years US Marine Corps Force Recon, 4 years
Mentor	Lee Chang-jun	South Korea	ROK Army 707th Special Mission Group (Sangsa/Master Sergeant on reserve, 13 years active duty)

=== Participants ===
Name	Unit	Military Branch
Go In-ho	KDIC (Korean Defense Intelligence Command)	Republic of Korea Navy
Kim Yeong-cheol	KDIC (Korean Defense Intelligence Command)	Republic of Korea Navy
Gong Gi-hwan	UDT 해군특수전전단	Republic of Korea Navy
Kim Hyeon-gon	UDT 해군특수전전단	Republic of Korea Navy
Park Seong-min	UDT 해군특수전전단	Republic of Korea Navy
Kim Ho-jong	SSU (Sea Salvage & Rescue Unit) 해난구조전대	Republic of Korea Navy
Park Yo-sep	Marine Corps Special Recon 해병대수색대	Republic of Korea Navy
Park Han-gyeol	Marine Corps Special Recon 해병대수색대	Republic of Korea Navy
Lee Kang-woo	Marine Corps Special Recon 해병대수색대	Republic of Korea Navy
Chu Bu-yeon	Marine Corps Special Recon 해병대수색대	Republic of Korea Navy
Kim Yeong-hwan	707th Special Mission Group 제707특수임무단	Republic of Korea Army
Hong Guk-seong	707th Special Mission Group 제707특수임무단	Republic of Korea Army
Hong Beom-seok	707th Special Mission Group 제707특수임무단	Republic of Korea Army
Park Se-won	Special Warfare Command 육군특수전사령부	Republic of Korea Army
Park Jang-ho	Special Warfare Command 육군특수전사령부	Republic of Korea Army
Park Hyeok-gyu	Special Warfare Command 육군특수전사령부	Republic of Korea Army
Song Byeong-seok	Special Warfare Command 육군특수전사령부	Republic of Korea Army
Jo Seung-jun	Special Warfare Command 육군특수전사령부	Republic of Korea Army
Hwang Seong-hyun	SDT (Special Duty Team) 군사경찰특임대	Republic of Korea Army
Kim Chang-wan	CCT (Combat Control Team) 공군공정통제사	Republic of Korea Air Force

== List of episodes ==
In the ratings below, the highest rating for the season will be in red and the lowest rating for the season will be in blue.

Episodes	Broadcast Date	Rating
1	November 19, 2021	2.8%
2	November 26, 2021	2.6%
3	December 3, 2021	2.1%
4	December 10, 2021	2.9%
5	December 17, 2021	2.0%
6	December 24, 2021	2.3%
7	January 7, 2022 (Note: The show did not air a new episode on December 31, 2021 due to the airing of the 2021 SBS Drama Awards.)	1.7%
8	January 14, 2022	1.2%
9	January 21, 2022	1.8%
10	January 28, 2022	1.4%

== Mission results ==
The show began with an individual competition, spanning episodes 1 to 3, to assess and rank the 20 participants. At the end of this stage, 4 participants were eliminated. The mentors then collectively ranked the remaining 16 participants prior to selecting their desired team members. However, the top 4 ranked participants were given the right to choose which mentor's team to join instead. From the second half of episode 3, the show then proceeded with the main team competition. In the tables below,

- results in red indicate a penalty given, such as an extra mission or becoming a candidate for elimination.
- results in green indicate either gaining a mission benefit or surviving an elimination round.
- the final champion is indicated in gold.

Participant	Unit	Individual Competition				
Participant	Unit	Inclined March Race (Note: Based on their ranking, participants were divided into "higher ranking" (1st to 10th) and "lower ranking" (11th to 20th) bunks for the first night.)	Assault Course (Note: As 8 participants failed to complete the full assault course, a rematch was conducted with a shortened assault course to determine the first 4 elimination candidates.)	Tire Tug & Deep Tank	Boxing Battle	Overall Rank
Go In-ho	UDU	6th	Group 4: Failed		Won	15th
Kim Yeong-cheol	UDU	8th	Group 1: Failed		Eliminated	
Gong Gi-hwan	UDT	9th	Group 1: 3rd	Group 3: 2nd		4th
Kim Hyeon-gon	UDT	7th	Group 3: Failed	Group 4: 2nd		9th
Park Seong-min	UDT	12th	Group 2: Failed		Won	13th
Kim Ho-jong	SSU	14th	Group 2: 1st	Group 1: 2nd		7th
Park Yo-sep	MCSR	17th	Group 2: Failed	Group 3: 4th	Eliminated	
Park Han-gyeol	MCSR	10th	Group 4: 1st	Group 1: 3rd		5th
Lee Kang-woo	MCSR	19th	Group 1: Failed	Group 4: 4th	Won	16th
Chu Bu-yeon	MCSR	15th	Group 3: Failed	Group 4: 1st		10th
Kim Yeong-hwan	707	4th	Group 4: 4th	Group 4: 3rd		6th
Hong Guk-seong	707	3rd	Group 3: 1st	Group 1: 4th	Won	11th
Hong Beom-seok	707	1st	Group 1: 1st	Group 1: 1st		1st
Park Se-won	SWC	16th	Group 4: 3rd	Group 3: 3rd		14th
Park Jang-ho	SWC	13th	Group 4: 2nd	Group 2: 4th	Eliminated	
Park Hyeok-gyu	SWC	20th	Group 3: 2nd	Group 2: 1st		12th
Song Byeong-seok	SWC	2nd	Group 2: 2nd	Group 2: 3rd		3rd
Jo Seung-jun	SWC	11th	Group 3: 3rd	Group 3: 1st		8th
Hwang Seong-hyun	SDT	18th	Group 2: Failed		Eliminated	
Kim Chang-wan	CCT	5th	Group 1: 2nd	Group 2: 2nd		2nd

Participant	Unit	Team	Team Competition					
Participant	Unit	Team	Obstacle Route March	Cave Escape	Mud Car Rescue	Counter-terrorism Rescue	Underwater Retrieval Mission	Battlefield
Lee Chang-jun (South Korea)	Leader	Alpha	1st		3rd	2nd	1st	Won
Kim Chang-wan	CCT	Alpha	1st		3rd	2nd	1st	Won
Kim Ho-jong	SSU	Alpha	1st		3rd	2nd	1st	Won
Chu Bu-yeon	MCSR	Alpha	1st		3rd	2nd	1st	Won
Hong Beom-seok	707	Alpha	1st		3rd	2nd	1st	Won
Jay Morton (United Kingdom)	Leader	Bravo	2nd		1st	1st	2nd	Eliminated
Gong Gi-hwan	UDT	Bravo	2nd		1st	1st	2nd	Eliminated
Kim Yeong-hwan	707	Bravo	2nd		1st	1st	2nd	Eliminated
Kim Hyeon-gon	UDT	Bravo	2nd		1st	1st	2nd	Eliminated
Song Byeong-seok	SWC	Bravo	2nd		1st	1st	2nd	Eliminated
Johan Reispass (Sweden)	Leader	Charlie	3rd	Won	2nd	Eliminated		
Go In-ho	HID	Charlie	3rd	Won	2nd	Eliminated		
Park Se-won	SWC	Charlie	3rd	Won	2nd	Eliminated		
Park Han-gyeol	MCSR	Charlie	3rd	Won	2nd	Eliminated		
Jo Seung-jun	SWC	Charlie	3rd	Won	2nd	Eliminated		
Wil Ravelo (United States)	Leader	Delta	4th	Failed		3rd	Eliminated	
Park Seong-min	UDT	Delta	4th	Failed		3rd	Eliminated	
Park Hyeok-gyu	SWC	Delta	4th	Failed		3rd	Eliminated	
Lee Kang-woo	MCSR	Delta	4th	Failed		3rd	Eliminated	
Hong Guk-seong	707	Delta	4th	Failed		3rd	Eliminated	
