= List of counter-terrorism agencies =

This is a list of counter-terrorism agencies by country.

A counter-terrorism agency is a government agency or military agency responsible for counter terrorism.

Albania	Anti-Terror Department; Albanian Police; · State Intelligence Service
Australia	Australian Security and Intelligence Organization (ASIO); · Tactical assault group
Austria	Austrian Military Police; · EKO Cobra
Bangladesh	RAB; Bangladesh Police · ATU; Rajshahi Metropolitan Police · CRT; Chittagong Metropolitan Police · CTD; National Security Intelligence · Anti Terrorism Cell; Directorate General of Forces Intelligence · CTIB; Bangladesh Army · Anti Terrorism Squad; Special Branch · CTTI; Dhaka Metropolitan Police · CTTC; SWAT
Bosnia and Herzegovina	SIPA
Canada	Royal Canadian Mounted Police; Integrated National Security Enforcement Teams; Canadian Security Intelligence Service; Integrated Terrorism Assessment Centre
Croatia	SOA; VSOA
Czechia	Police - Rapid Response Unit Military - 601 SFG
Estonia	KaPo; K-Commando
France	RAID: GIGN · Gendarmerie Nationale; BRI DGSI , DGSE , UCLAT , DRSD 1 er rpima Commando marine Police Nationale
Georgia	Designated – Counter Terrorism Center State Security Service; Federal: MIA – Special Emergency and Crisis Center
Greece	EKAM; NIS
Hungary	Counter Terrorism Centre; Alert Police; Hungarian Homeland Defence Forces
India	Intelligence Bureau; Multi-Agency Centre; National Investigation Agency; National Security Guard; Rashtriya Rifles; Research and Analysis Wing
Indonesia	BNPT|Densus 88|Brimob
Iran	PSP; SAHEFAJA; SAHEFASA; VAJA
Iraq	Directorate-General for Intelligence and Security (DGIS); INIS; KRSC; Iraqi Counter Terrorism Service
Ireland	IMIS; C3
Israel	Mossad; Shin Bet; · Yamam
Japan	CIRO Counter Terrorism Intelligence Coordination Center; JCG Security and Intelligence Division; NPASB; PSB; PSIA Second Intelligence Department Section 1; · Special Assault Team
Malaysia	SB
Myanmar	OCMSA; SID
Namibia	NCIS
Nepal	DMI; NID
Nigeria	National Intelligence Agency
North Korea	MSSDPRK
Pakistan	CTD; FIA; IB; ISI; NACTA
Papua New Guinea	NIO
Russia	FSB; FSO; GRU; SVR
Singapore	ISD
Slovenia	SOVA; SEP Slovenian national police forces
Somalia	NISA; Somali Police Force (SPF)
South Korea	707th Special Mission Group; NIS; KCG Intelligence Division; KNPA Intelligence Bureau
Spain	CITCO; CGI; SIGC
Thailand	Counter Terrorist Operations Center (CTOC); NIA Counterterrorism Division; RTP Counter Terrorism Sub-Division; SBB
Ukraine	ATC; SBU
United Kingdom	Counter Terrorism Policing; Intelligence Corps; Specialist Firearms Command; Security Service (MI5); MI6; Joint Terrorism Analysis Centre; GCHQ; · Special Air Service
United States	Bureau of Counterterrorism and Countering Violent Extremism, CIA Counterterrorism Mission Center; U.S. Coast Guard, Deployable Specialized Forces; Customs and Border Protection (CBP), Border Protection Special Operations Group (BORTAC); Department of Homeland Security (DHS), Homeland Security Investigations, Counterterrorism and Criminal Exploitation Unit; Diplomatic Security Service; FBI Counterterrorism Division; Federal Air Marshal Service; Intelligence Support Activity (ISA); National Counterterrorism Center; National Security Agency (NSA); U.S. Secret Service, (Secret Service Counter Assault Team)
Vietnam	Asia Intelligence Bureau; Bureau of Secret Intelligence

== See also ==
- List of intelligence agencies
- List of law enforcement agencies
- List of counterintelligence organizations
- List of protective service agencies
- List of police tactical units
- List of military special forces units
