= Steel Troops =

South Korean television program

- Promotional poster for Season 2
- Also known as: The Iron Squad
- Genre: Reality television, military
- Starring: Kim Sung-joo; Kim Hee-chul; Kim Dong-hyun; Choi Young-jae; Chuu (Season 1, 3); Yoon Doo-joon (Season 3); Jang Dong-min (Season 1-2); An Yu-jin (Season 2)
- Country of origin: South Korea
- Original language: Korean
- No. of seasons: 3
- No. of episodes: 28 + 6 specials

Production
- Running time: 100 minutes

Original release
- Network: Channel A, ENA (formerly skyTV)
- Release: March 23, 2021 – present

Steel Troops (Korean: 강철부대; RR: Gangcheolbudae) is a South Korean reality show broadcast on Channel A and ENA (formerly skyTV). Dubbed a "military survival program," the show features male South Korean reservists who served in various special forces units across different branches of the Republic of Korea Armed Forces. Participants go head to head in teams of four, representing their respective unit to fight for the title of the best special forces unit in Korea.

A series of missions, designed by military experts, test the participants' physical stamina, mental strength, and cooperation to determine the last team standing. Episodes also include concurrent commentary from a panel of hosts, including the "Master" who runs the competition events.

Season 1 aired every Tuesday at 22:30 (KST) from March 23, 2021, to July 20, 2021. This season featured 24 participants from six units across the Republic of Korea Army and Republic of Korea Navy. It was also released on Netflix under the title The Iron Squad and gained a high viewership ranking on release.

Season 2 aired every Tuesday at 21:20 (KST) from February 22, 2022, to June 7, 2022. The new season introduces two new units not featured in Season 1, including one from the Republic of Korea Air Force, for a total of 32 participants hailing from eight units.

Season 3 premiered on September 19, 2023 and airs every Tuesday at 22:30 (KST). Another two new units were introduced, including the first non-Korean team, composed of former retired US special forces members, alongside new participants from the top four units of Season 2.

== Hosts ==
Panelist	Season 1	Season 2	Season 3	W
Kim Sung-joo	All episodes	All episodes	All episodes	All episodes
Jang Dong-min	All episodes	Ep. 1–8		
Kim Hee-chul	All episodes	Absent in ep. 9	All episodes	All episodes
Kim Dong-hyun	All episodes	Absent in ep. 5–6	All episodes	All episodes
Choi Young-jae (Master)	All episodes	All episodes	All episodes	All episodes
Chuu	Absent in ep. 13–14		All episodes	All episodes
An Yu-jin		Absent in ep. 10–12		
Yoon Doo-joon			All episodes	
Jang Eun-sil				All episodes
Guest Panelists
Park Goon	Ep. 13	Ep. 6, 10–16 (Note: Park Goon joined as a fixed panelist from episode 10, following Jang Dong-min's departure from the show.)		
Yujeong (Brave Girls)	Ep. 14			
Oh Jong-hyuk		Ep. 5, 9		
Yuk Jun-Seo		Ep. 9–12		
Jo Sung-won				Ep. 7–10

== Participants ==
Each team consists of four reservists representing their respective special forces unit, with a team leader (indicated in bold) selected by the team members.

Part of a Season 2 promotional poster featuring team emblems used on the show

Season 1

Unit Name	Military Branch	Members	Reservist Rank
Special Warfare Command (육군특수전사령부)	ROK Army	**Park Jun-woo (Park Goon)**	Sangsa (Master sergeant)
Special Warfare Command (육군특수전사령부)	ROK Army	Jeong Tae-gyun (Marvel.J)	Jungwi (Lieutenant)
Special Warfare Command (육군특수전사령부)	ROK Army	Kim Hyun-dong	Hasa (Staff sergeant)
Special Warfare Command (육군특수전사령부)	ROK Army	Park Do-hyeon	Jungsa (Sergeant first class)
Marine Corps Special Recon (해병대특수수색대)	ROK Marine Corps	**Oh Jong-hyuk**	Byeongjang (Sergeant)
Marine Corps Special Recon (해병대특수수색대)	ROK Marine Corps	Ahn Philip	Hasa (Staff sergeant)
Marine Corps Special Recon (해병대특수수색대)	ROK Marine Corps	Jeong Hoon	Jungwi (Lieutenant)
Marine Corps Special Recon (해병대특수수색대)	ROK Marine Corps	Ahn Tae-hwan	Byeongjang (Sergeant)
707th Special Mission Group (제707특수임무단)	ROK Army	**Lee Jin-bong**	Jungsa (Sergeant first class)
707th Special Mission Group (제707특수임무단)	ROK Army	Im Woo-young	Jungsa (Sergeant first class)
707th Special Mission Group (제707특수임무단)	ROK Army	Yeom Seung-chul	Jungsa (Sergeant first class)
707th Special Mission Group (제707특수임무단)	ROK Army	Kim Pil-sung (Note: Kim Pil-sung joined the 707 team from episode 12, replacing Park Soo-min.)	Jungsa (Sergeant first class)
707th Special Mission Group (제707특수임무단)	ROK Army	Park Soo-min (Note: Park Soo-min stepped down from the show following a personal scandal. His appearances in pre-taped footage were edited out entirely from episodes 4 to 11.)	Jungsa (Sergeant first class)
UDT (해군특수전전단)	ROK Navy	**Kim Bum-Seok (Kim Min-jun)**	Jungsa (Sergeant first class)
UDT (해군특수전전단)	ROK Navy	Yuk Jun-seo	Hasa (Staff sergeant)
UDT (해군특수전전단)	ROK Navy	Jeong Jong-hyun	Jungsa (Sergeant first class)
UDT (해군특수전전단)	ROK Navy	Kim Sang-wook	Byeongjang (Sergeant)
SDT (Special Duty Team) (군사경찰특임대)	ROK Army	**Kim Min-su**	Byeongjang (Sergeant)
SDT (Special Duty Team) (군사경찰특임대)	ROK Army	Lee Jeong-min	Byeongjang (Sergeant)
SDT (Special Duty Team) (군사경찰특임대)	ROK Army	Kang Jun	Byeongjang (Sergeant)
SDT (Special Duty Team) (군사경찰특임대)	ROK Army	Kang Won-jae	Byeongjang (Sergeant)
SSU (Sea Salvage & Rescue Unit) (해난구조전대)	ROK Navy	**Jeong Seong-hoon**	Hasa (Staff sergeant)
SSU (Sea Salvage & Rescue Unit) (해난구조전대)	ROK Navy	Jeong Hae-chul	Byeongjang (Sergeant)
SSU (Sea Salvage & Rescue Unit) (해난구조전대)	ROK Navy	Kim Min-su	Byeongjang (Sergeant)
SSU (Sea Salvage & Rescue Unit) (해난구조전대)	ROK Navy	Hwang Chung-won	Byeongjang (Sergeant)

Season 2

Unit Name	Military Branch	Members	Reservist Rank
Special Warfare Command (육군특수전사령부)	ROK Army	**Kim Hwang-jung** (Note: Kim Hwang-jung stepped down from the show in episode 7 due to personal injury. He was succeeded by Choi Yong-jun as the team leader.)	Jungwi (Lieutenant)
Special Warfare Command (육군특수전사령부)	ROK Army	Oh Sang-young	Jungsa (Sergeant first class)
Special Warfare Command (육군특수전사령부)	ROK Army	**Choi Yong-jun**	Jungsa (Sergeant first class)
Special Warfare Command (육군특수전사령부)	ROK Army	Jeong Tae-pung	Byeongjang (Sergeant)
Special Warfare Command (육군특수전사령부)	ROK Army	Seong Tae-hyun (Note: Seong Tae-hyun joined the show from episode 7, replacing Kim Hwang-jung.)	Jungsa (Sergeant first class)
Marine Corps Special Recon (해병대특수수색대)	ROK Marine Corps	**Jeong Ho-geun**	Jungwi (Lieutenant)
Marine Corps Special Recon (해병대특수수색대)	ROK Marine Corps	Park Gil-yeon	Hasa (Staff sergeant)
Marine Corps Special Recon (해병대특수수색대)	ROK Marine Corps	Lee Dae-young	Byeongjang (Sergeant)
Marine Corps Special Recon (해병대특수수색대)	ROK Marine Corps	Gu Dong-yeol	Byeongjang (Sergeant)
707th Special Mission Group (제707특수임무단)	ROK Army	**Lee Ju-yong**	Jungsa (Sergeant first class)
707th Special Mission Group (제707특수임무단)	ROK Army	Hong Myeong-hwa	Jungsa (Sergeant first class)
707th Special Mission Group (제707특수임무단)	ROK Army	Gu Seong-hwi	Jungsa (Sergeant first class)
707th Special Mission Group (제707특수임무단)	ROK Army	Lee Jeong-won	Jungsa (Sergeant first class)
UDT (해군특수전전단)	ROK Navy	**Yoon Jong-jin**	Hasa (Staff sergeant)
UDT (해군특수전전단)	ROK Navy	Gwon Ho-je	Jungsa (Sergeant first class)
UDT (해군특수전전단)	ROK Navy	Gu Min-cheol	Hasa (Staff sergeant)
UDT (해군특수전전단)	ROK Navy	Kim Myeong-jae	Byeongjang (Sergeant)
SDT (Special Duty Team) (Note: As a military police unit, SDTs exist in each branch of the ROK Armed Forces. Season 2 includes representatives across all branches, unlike Season 1.) (군사경찰특임대)	ROK Navy	**Song Bo-geun**	Byeongjang (Sergeant)
SDT (Special Duty Team) (군사경찰특임대)	ROK Army	Choi Seong-hyeon	Byeongjang (Sergeant)
SDT (Special Duty Team) (군사경찰특임대)	ROK Army	Ji Won-jae (Note: Ji Won-jae stepped down in episode 6 after sustaining a leg injury during a mission. He was replaced by Kang Jun from Season 1.)	Byeongjang (Sergeant)
SDT (Special Duty Team) (군사경찰특임대)	ROK Air Force	Kim Tae-ho	Byeongjang (Sergeant)
SDT (Special Duty Team) (군사경찰특임대)	ROK Army	Kang Jun	Byeongjang (Sergeant)
SSU (Sea Salvage & Rescue Unit) (해난구조전대)	ROK Navy	**Kim Dong-rok**	Jungsa (Sergeant first class)
SSU (Sea Salvage & Rescue Unit) (해난구조전대)	ROK Navy	Heo Nam-gil	Hasa (Staff sergeant)
SSU (Sea Salvage & Rescue Unit) (해난구조전대)	ROK Navy	Kim Jeong-woo	Hasa (Staff sergeant)
SSU (Sea Salvage & Rescue Unit) (해난구조전대)	ROK Navy	Kim Geon	Byeongjang (Sergeant)
SART (Special Air Rescue Team) (특수탐색구조대대)	ROK Air Force	**Jeon Hyeong-jin**	Hasa (Staff sergeant)
SART (Special Air Rescue Team) (특수탐색구조대대)	ROK Air Force	Kang Cheong-myung	Jungsa (Sergeant first class)
SART (Special Air Rescue Team) (특수탐색구조대대)	ROK Air Force	Jo Seong-ho	Hasa (Staff sergeant)
SART (Special Air Rescue Team) (특수탐색구조대대)	ROK Air Force	Lee Yu-jeong	Jungsa (Sergeant first class)
HID (Headquarters of Intelligence Detachment) (국군정보사령부특임대)	ROK Army (ROK Defence Intelligence Command)	**Kim Seung-min**	Undisclosed (Note: Due to the unit's classified status, the members' individual ranks were not disclosed.)
HID (Headquarters of Intelligence Detachment) (국군정보사령부특임대)	ROK Army (ROK Defence Intelligence Command)	Lee Min-gon	Undisclosed
HID (Headquarters of Intelligence Detachment) (국군정보사령부특임대)	ROK Army (ROK Defence Intelligence Command)	Han Jae-sung	Undisclosed
HID (Headquarters of Intelligence Detachment) (국군정보사령부특임대)	ROK Army (ROK Defence Intelligence Command)	Lee Dong-gyu	Undisclosed

Season 3

Unit Name	Military Branch	Members	Reservist Rank
Special Warfare Command (육군특수전사령부)	ROK Army	**Bae Yi-jeong**	Daewi (Captain)
Special Warfare Command (육군특수전사령부)	ROK Army	Park Mun-ho	Jungsa (Sergeant first class)
Special Warfare Command (육군특수전사령부)	ROK Army	Jeong Seung-hun	Jungsa (Sergeant first class)
Special Warfare Command (육군특수전사령부)	ROK Army	Kim Dae-seong	Jungsa (Sergeant first class)
707th Special Mission Group (제707특수임무단)	ROK Army	**Hong Beom-seok**	Sangsa (Master sergeant)
707th Special Mission Group (제707특수임무단)	ROK Army	Oh Yo-han	Daewi (Captain)
707th Special Mission Group (제707특수임무단)	ROK Army	Park Chan-gyu	Jungsa (Sergeant first class)
707th Special Mission Group (제707특수임무단)	ROK Army	Lee Yu-seok	Jungsa (Sergeant first class)
UDT (해군특수전전단)	ROK Navy	**Kim Gyeong-baek**	Sangsa (Master sergeant)
UDT (해군특수전전단)	ROK Navy	Lee Jeong-jun	Daewi (Captain)
UDT (해군특수전전단)	ROK Navy	Jeong Jong-hyun (Note: Returning participant, previously on Season 1's UDT team)	Jungsa (Sergeant first class)
UDT (해군특수전전단)	ROK Navy	Lee Han-jun	Hasa (Staff sergeant)
HID (Headquarters of Intelligence Detachment) (육군첩보부대)	ROK Army (ROK Defence Intelligence Command)	**Kang Min-ho**	Undisclosed
HID (Headquarters of Intelligence Detachment) (육군첩보부대)	ROK Army (ROK Defence Intelligence Command)	Go Ya-yung	Undisclosed
HID (Headquarters of Intelligence Detachment) (육군첩보부대)	ROK Army (ROK Defence Intelligence Command)	Park Ji-yun	Undisclosed
HID (Headquarters of Intelligence Detachment) (육군첩보부대)	ROK Army (ROK Defence Intelligence Command)	Lee Dong-gyu (Note: Returning participant, previously on Season 2's HID team)	Undisclosed
UDU (Underwater Demolition Unit) (해군첩보부대)	ROK Navy (ROK Defence Intelligence Command)	**Kim Su-won**	Undisclosed
UDU (Underwater Demolition Unit) (해군첩보부대)	ROK Navy (ROK Defence Intelligence Command)	Kim Hyeon-yeong	Undisclosed
UDU (Underwater Demolition Unit) (해군첩보부대)	ROK Navy (ROK Defence Intelligence Command)	Go In-ho	Undisclosed
UDU (Underwater Demolition Unit) (해군첩보부대)	ROK Navy (ROK Defence Intelligence Command)	Lee Byeong-ju	Undisclosed
USSF (United States Special Forces)	US Navy SEALs	Kaj Larsen (Age: 46)	Lieutenant Commander (Ret.)
USSF (United States Special Forces)	US Navy SEALs	Ian Schinelli (Age: 37)	Petty Officer First Class (Ret.)
USSF (United States Special Forces)	US Navy SEALs	Jeff Gum (Age: 39)	Petty Officer First Class (Ret.)
USSF (United States Special Forces)	US Green Beret and Marine Force Recon (not listed on show)	Wil Ravelo (Age: 46)	Sergeant First Class (Ret.)

== List of episodes ==
In the ratings below, the highest rating for the season will be in red and the lowest rating for the season will be in blue.

Season 1

Episode	Broadcast Date	Rating
1	March 23, 2021	2.943%
2	March 30, 2021	3.484%
3	April 6, 2021	4.353%
4	April 13, 2021	4.900%
5	April 20, 2021	4.746%
6	April 27, 2021	4.834%
7	May 4, 2021	6.267%
8	May 11, 2021	5.902%
9	May 18, 2021	6.844%
10	May 25, 2021	5.777%
11	June 1, 2021	5.721%
12	June 8, 2021	5.628%
13	June 15, 2021	5.410%
14	June 22, 2021	4.746%
"Reunion" Special
15	June 29, 2021	4.210%
16	July 6, 2021	3.712%
"Behind the Scenes" Special
17	July 13, 2021	3.022%
18	July 20, 2021	1.6%

Season 2

Episodes	Broadcast Date	Rating
1	February 22, 2022	4.209%
2	March 1, 2022	4.377%
3	March 8, 2022	3.722%
4	March 15, 2022	3.330%
5	March 22, 2022	2.9%
6	March 29, 2022	3.1%
7	April 5, 2022	3.833%
8	April 12, 2022	3.379%
9	April 19, 2022	3.545%
10	April 26, 2022	3.506%
11	May 3, 2022	3.415%
12	May 10, 2022	3.589%
13	May 17, 2022	3.537%
14	May 24, 2022	3.105%

== Mission results ==
=== Season 1 ===
The first three elimination stages followed a double-elimination tournament style, with a main mission (indicated in bold) determining the participants of the "Death Match" elimination round. Following the revival round, the competition switched to a single-elimination style without a Death Match. Each stage also featured a "Benefit Mission" where the winner would be given an advantage in the main mission that followed. In the case of the second elimination stage, the lowest-ranking team was also sent directly to Death Match, bypassing the main mission.

Stage	Mission		SWC	MCSR	707	UDT	SDT	SSU
Strongest member contest (Note: Conducted as an individual contest, the final winner was crowned the "strongest member" and his team awarded a benefit in the first main mission.)	Round 1: Trench Combat		2 advanced	3 advanced	1 advanced	2 advanced	2 advanced	2 advanced
Strongest member contest	Round 2: Assault Course		2 advanced	0 advanced	0 advanced	1 advanced	1 advanced	1 advanced
Strongest member contest	Round 3: Winter Sea Rescue		3rd, 4th			2nd	5th	1st (Note: Jeong Hae-chul of the SSU team was crowned the "strongest member" of Season 1.)
First elimination	**IBS Rescue**		Lost (vs 707)	Lost (vs UDT)	Won (vs SWC)	Won (vs MCSR)	Lost (vs SSU)	Won (vs SDT)
First elimination	Death Match: Tire Flip		1st	**Eliminated**			2nd	
Second elimination	Benefit Mission	Round 1: Highland Race	2nd		1st	4th	5th	3rd
Second elimination	Benefit Mission	Round 2: Range Shooting				Lost	Won	
Second elimination	**Counter-terrorism Rescue**		Won (vs SDT)		Won (vs SSU)		Lost (vs SWC)	Lost (vs 707)
Second elimination	Death Match: 10 km Mountain March					1st	**Eliminated**	2nd
Third elimination	Benefit Mission	Round 1: Capture the Leader	Won (vs SSU)		Lost (Note: The 707 team voluntarily ceded victory to the UDT team before the match.) (vs UDT)	Won (vs 707)		Lost (vs SWC)
Third elimination	Benefit Mission	Round 2: Tire Tug-of-war	Lost			Won		
Third elimination	**Nightfall Joint Operation** (SWC & 707 vs UDT & SSU)		Won		Won	Lost		Lost
Third elimination	Death Match: Tire Scramble					Won		**Eliminated**
Revival Round: Breaching Garorim Bay				2nd			3rd	**Revived**
Round of 4	Benefit Mission: Target Shooting		3rd		2nd	1st		
Round of 4	**Recapture the Ship** (SWC vs UDT)		**Eliminated**			Won		
Round of 4	**Frontline Supplies** (707 vs SSU)				**Eliminated**			Won
Final	Benefit Mission: Marine Infiltration					Won		Lost
Final	**Operation Isabu**					**Won**		**Runner-up**

=== Season 2 ===
The second season largely continued with the format of main missions and Death Matches until the round of 4, with the exception of the first stage which was a direct elimination round. Other notable changes include:

- Upgraded benefits, such as an increased quantity (strongest member contest) or automatic advancement to the next stage (second Benefit Mission)
- Use of live firing in shooting contests, instead of airsoft guns as used in Season 1
- Joint elimination, as in the third stage
- Possibility of mission failure, as in the second and final stages

Stage	Mission		SWC	MCSR	707	UDT	SDT	SSU	SART	HID
Strongest member contest (Note: This individual contest in Season 2 provided 3 different benefits to the top 3, as opposed to a single benefit for the top 1 in Season 1.)	Round 1: Trench Combat		2 advanced	2 advanced	2 advanced	2 advanced	2 advanced	1 advanced	0 advanced	1 advanced
Strongest member contest	Round 2: Assault Course		1 advanced	1 advanced	2 advanced	0 advanced	1 advanced	1 advanced		0 advanced
Strongest member contest	Round 3: 100 kg Log Pull		3rd	2nd	1st, (Note: Lee Ju-yong of the 707 team was crowned the "strongest member" of Season 2.) 6th		4th	5th		
First elimination	**Winter Highland Race** (Note: Each match's winning team automatically advanced, while the losing team with the slowest time was eliminated.)		Won (vs SDT)	Won (vs SSU)	Won (vs HID)	Lost (vs SART)	Lost (vs SWC)	Lost (vs MCSR)	Won (vs UDT)	Lost (vs 707)
First elimination	**Winter Highland Race**		Won (vs SDT)	Won (vs SSU)	Won (vs HID)	Survived	Survived	**Eliminated**	Won (vs UDT)	Survived
Second elimination	Benefit Mission	Round 1: Precision Shooting	2nd (27)	6th (22)	7th (19) (Note: Lee Ju-yong shot a total of 28 points, but his last shot was disqualified as it exceeded the 10-second time limit.)	2nd (27)	5th (24)		4th (26)	1st (28)
Second elimination	Benefit Mission	Round 2: Infiltration Sniper	3rd			2nd				1st
Second elimination	**Counter-terrorism Hostage Rescue**		Won (vs 707)	Won (vs SART)	Lost (vs SWC)	Won (vs SDT)	Lost (vs UDT)		Lost (vs MCSR)	Advanced
Second elimination	Death Match: 50 kg Signal Gear Transport				2nd		**Eliminated**		1st	
Third elimination (Note: Alliances of two teams each were formed and maintained for all missions in this stage.)	Benefit Mission: Rucksack Foot Volleyball		Won	Advanced	Lost	Lost			Advanced	Won
Third elimination	Benefit Mission: Rucksack Foot Volleyball		Won	Lost					Lost	Won
Third elimination	**Maritime Joint Operation**		2nd (with HID)	3rd (with SART)	1st (with UDT)	1st (with 707)			3rd (with MCSR)	2nd (with SWC)
Third elimination	Death Match: Alliance Tire Flip		Won	**Eliminated**					**Eliminated**	Won
Round of 4	Benefit Mission	Round 1: Capture the Flag	Won (vs 707)		Lost (vs SWC)	Lost (vs HID)				Won (vs UDT)
Round of 4	Benefit Mission	Round 2: Capture the Leader	Lost (vs HID)							Won (vs SWC)
Round of 4	**Recapture the Plane** (SWC vs 707)		Won		**Eliminated**					
Round of 4	**Garorim Bay Supplies** (UDT vs HID)					Won				**Eliminated**
Final	Benefit Mission: Shooting Roundup (Note: This Benefit Mission was split into three rounds, where the first team to secure two victories won the benefit.): Round 1: Precision Shooting; Round 2: Mobile Shooting; Round 3: Infiltration Sniper		Lost (1:2)			Won (2:1)				
Final	**Operation Nuri**		**Won**			**Runner-up**				

=== Season 3 ===
As of the second elimination stage, the competition format remains unchanged. This season opened with a notably higher calibre team introductions segment, where the customary pull-up friendly contest in a filming studio was upgraded to live firing at sea on a Korean Coast Guard vessel. Other show firsts included:

- Access to military bases for events involving live firing
- Use of MILES gear by opposition forces
- Participants joining the opposition forces against their competitors, as in the second stage

Stage	Mission		SWC	707	UDT	HID	UDU	USSF
Strongest member contest (Note: As in Season 1, only the top "strongest member" won the benefit for his team.)	Round 1: Trench Combat		2 advanced	0 advanced	4 advanced	4 advanced	2 advanced	0 advanced
Strongest member contest	Round 2: Assault Course		0 advanced		2 advanced (Note: Lee Han-jun eventually forfeited his place in the next round after suffering a leg injury while finishing the assault course.)	3 advanced	1 advanced	
Strongest member contest	Round 3: Hostage Rescue & Shooting				Won (Note: Jeong Jong-hyun of the UDT team was crowned the "strongest member" of Season 3.)	Lost	Lost	
First elimination	**Marine Explosive Disposal**		Lost (vs UDU)	Won (vs HID)	Lost (vs USSF)	Lost (vs 707)	Won (vs SWC)	Won (vs UDT)
First elimination	Death Match: 3-ton Truck Push		**Eliminated**		1st	2nd		
Second elimination	Benefit Mission 1	Round 1: Multi-Firearm Shooting		3rd	4th	1st	1st	5th
Second elimination	Benefit Mission 1	Round 2: Infiltration Sniper		3rd		1st	2nd	
Second elimination	Benefit Mission 2: Tire Tug-of-war			3rd	3rd		2nd	1st
Second elimination	**Counter-terrorism Joint Operation** (707 & USSF vs UDT & UDU)			Won	Lost	Advanced	Lost	Won
Second elimination	Death Match: Mud Flat Tire Flip				Won		**Eliminated**	
Round of 4	**Mopping-up Operations** (HID vs USSF)					Won		**Eliminated**
Round of 4	**Supply Foot March** (707 vs UDT)			Won	**Eliminated**			
Final	Benefit Mission: Integrated Mobile Shooting (Note: This Benefit Mission was a time attack split into three rounds, where the team with the shorter recorded time wins.): Round 1: Pistol Shooting; Round 2: Breaching and Rifle Shooting; Round 3: Marine Infiltration Sniper			Won (Quickest time over combined 3 rounds) 1.Lost 2. Win 3. Lost		Lost 1.Win 2. Lost 3. Win		
Final	**Summit VIP Rescue Operation**		**HID Won**					
