= Underwater Port Security System =

Defense against hostile swimmer incursions

Underwater Port Security System (UPSS) was developed for the United States Coast Guard and the Maritime Safety and Security Teams (MSSTs) for defense against swimmer incursions. It includes the Underwater Inspection System (UIS) and the Integrated Anti-Swimmer System (IAS). Recent developments in terrorism have highlighted the need for underwater anti-frogman security. The UPSS is made in the United States and is reported to be compact enough fit in a large suitcase.

The Coast Guard unveiled the system in February 2005 at the Coast Guard Integrated Support Command in San Pedro, California.

== Ship Protection System ==
The Ship Protection System (SPS) is a ship-based underwater threat detection system manufactured by FarSounder, Inc. Based on FarSounder's 3D forward looking sonar, their SPS offers 360° coverage of underwater threats to vessels at anchor or at dock. This is a commercial product suitable for mega yachts.

SAES has developed an active diver detection sonar DDS-03 that has been specifically designed for the detection of underwater threats such as divers and crewed and uncrewed underwater vehicles (SDV, ROV or UUV), offering protection and surveillance to counter the threat of underwater attacks against harbours, critical facilities, ships, offshore platforms, coastal power plants, shipwrecks, environmentally protected areas and maritime special events.

== Underwater Inspection System ==
The Underwater Inspection System (UIS) is a system manufactured by CodaOctopus and consists of the unique Echoscope Real Time 3D Sonar that is used to scan the underwater environment in zero visibility waters. The UIS system can be mounted on a small boat to scan harbor walls, piers, bridges for an underwater threat and can be used to complement long range diver detection systems by classifying the threat in 3D in real time. The same system can be mounted on remotely operated vehicles (ROVs) to create 3D ship hull scans detecting small mine size objects.

== Integrated Anti-Swimmer System ==
The Integrated Anti-Swimmer System is a United States Coast Guard underwater anti-diver ultrasound weapons system. IAS includes:-

- SM2000 (Underwater Surveillance System), a search sonar made by Kongsberg Maritime.
- An underwater warning loudspeaker.
- An underwater shockwave emitter that can force divers to surface, or stun or kill them. The US Coast Guard calls it an "nonlethal interdiction acoustic impulse".

It can track underwater objects, similarly to an air traffic control radar. Like other systems, such as the Cerberus or DDS-03 are semi-intelligent and can distinguish humans from marine animals, partly because of their different shapes and typical movements underwater. This is not impeded by darkness or fog or low underwater visibility, and is a great improvement on scanning the water surface by eye from above. Various test attempts by MSST divers to trick the system did not work.

In most cases the detected diver would be warned by the underwater loudspeaker; after that, the shockwave emitter would be fired once as a warning, before it is fired to stun or kill. (There is no discussion of other conceivable situations, such as where the diver has a pre-existing hearing impairment and/or where the diver merely mistakes the shockwave as originating for some other reason completely unrelated to port security.)

Other Anti-Swimmer-based systems that have been invented, instead of shock-waves, use sound-waves which 'disrupt' the diver causing sickness and disorientation. This technique is considered non-lethal and has been developed using an array of underwater speakers.
