= Diver detection sonar =

Acoustic location systems to detect divers and submerged swimmer delivery vehicles

Diver detection sonar (DDS) systems are sonar and acoustic location systems for detecting, tracking and classifying underwater threats, such as divers and submerged swimmer delivery vehicles (SDVs). DDS systems have been developed to provide underwater security for ports, coastal facilities, offshore installations, pipelines, and ships. A DDS system should be able to distinguish threats from other phenomena, such as large sea mammals, shoals of fish or a ship's wake. DDS systems have been developed for mounting on the seabed, a pier, or the hull of a vessel. For complete port security, DDS systems are integrated with the surface surveillance and security systems employed at ports, coastal facilities and offshore installations.

== Evaluation of DDS systems ==
In 2006, R. T. Kessel and R. D. Hollet published a report at the NATO Undersea Research Center, evaluating cost-effectiveness and maturity of DDS systems. This study was performed in conjunction with the Italian navy.

=== Cost-effectiveness ===
According to the report, sonar has the lowest cost per square meter of underwater coverage, compared to other means of surveillance, such as radar, video or visual. This is due to sound waves having a low attenuation and long propagation distance in turbid harbor waters compared to other means of sensing (electromagnetic waves, visual light, temperature, magnetism). The leading sonar technology for detecting and tracking underwater intruders is active, monostatic sonar, taking advantage of conventional beam forming in its signal processing.

=== Maturity ===
- DDS demonstrated 360 degree coverage with detection ranges of 300 to 800m against intruders wearing open-circuit breathing equipment. This coverage is significant given the area of open water and the possible entry points for intruders in many harbors.
- Reduced detection range and track fragmentation can be accounted for by environmental conditions.
- Random false alarms are rare and clearly recognizable due to their short duration and lack of a clear track.
- Non-random false alarms caused by non-threat underwater contacts (e.g. large fish, schools of fish, marine mammals), can usually be recognized by an experienced operator by evaluating the path of their track. In addition, such false alarms confirm the correct functioning of the DDS system.
- Usability of DDS systems is optimized by hiding the echograph generated by the sonar units from the operator. Instead, DDS systems employ automated algorithms that extract relevant tracking information from source data and display this on a navigation chart. These algorithms are capable of detecting and tracking many contacts simultaneously.

== Commercial use ==
Below is a list of commercial DDS purchases sorted by date:

- June 2007: The Port of Gdańsk purchased the first DDS system to be installed in a commercial oil terminal.
- December 2008: A DDS system was purchased by an undisclosed EMEA government. It was installed in an area with critical infrastructure, including a port and energy production facilities.
- March 4, 2009: A $1.7M order for an underwater security system was placed, to be used for protecting a large energy facility at an undisclosed location in Asia.
- March 12, 2009: Multiple DDS sensors were purchased for protecting a strategic site against underwater intrusion.
- May 25, 2009: US Navy ordered additional DDS systems.
- December 2011: An Asian customer placed the world's largest DDS order so far, for protection of oil platforms.
- March 2012: Undisclosed navy placed repeat order for multiple DDS systems.
- May 2012: Multiple DDS systems were ordered for protecting undisclosed middle eastern facilities.
- August 2012: The Ministry of Defense of one of the world's largest armies ordered a portable DDS system.
- June 2016: The armed forces of Kazakhstan ordered several DDS systems for the second time.
- January 8, 2018: The Indian Navy ordered 78 PointShield portable DDS units.

== See also ==
- Anti-frogman techniques
- Cerberus Swimmer Detection System
- DDS-03 es:SAES
- Swimmer detection sonar AN/WQX-2
- NORBIT Intruder detection sonars (GUARDPOINT)
