= Counter Terrorism Service =

Counter Terrorism Service may refer to:

- Iraqi Counter Terrorism Service
- Counter Terrorism Service (Gaza)

== See also ==
- Counterterrorism
- Counter Terrorism Department
