= AN/WQX-2 =

Diver detection sonar used in defense against underwater incursions

The AN/WQX-2 is a diver detection sonar used for defense against swimmer incursions by the US Navy. Its primary function is finding range and bearing of the detected swimming target (surface or submerged) relative to the sonar. The sonar uses a complex set of track analysis heuristics and image classification algorithms to separate swimmers and divers from schools of fish, marine mammals, drifting debris and bubbles from boat wakes. This information allows personnel to locate and potentially neutralize potential threats.

In accordance with the Joint Electronics Type Designation System (JETDS), the "AN/WQX-2" designation represents the second design of an Army-Navy electronic device for combined surface and underwater sonar for identification and recognition. The JETDS system also now is used to name Coast Guard systems.

- AN/ - Army/Navy nomenclature system
- W - Water surface and underwater combined
- Q - Sonar and underwater sound
- X - identification and recognition
- 2 - Second type in this family of equipment

== History ==
The WQX-2 was developed by the Applied Research Laboratories, University of Texas at Austin (ARL: UT) in the 1990s. Once developed, it was integrated into the Waterside Security System (WSS) and installed at several Navy sites worldwide. Sonar parameters including beam width, frequency and transmitted power, were all optimized for swimmer detection. The WQX-2 can automatically detect, track, classify and alert users on both surface swimmers and divers in a 360-degree, 800 yards (730 m) coverage area. It provides the user with range and bearing information of the detectde target. Using the Command, Control, Communications, and Display (C^{3}D) console, this information is converted to a GPS position. Currently, the WQX-2 does not provide depth information of the swimmer to the user.

A presentation by the National Defense Industrial Association in the early 2000s described short-term and long term efforts to improve WSS subsurface operations. Planned efforts included adopting AN/WQX-2 software to other commercial off-the-shelf (COTS) products in the short-term, while modernizing the WQX-2 itself in the long term. Modernizations were made to the processor's software and hardware components of the sonar for a next generation AN/WQX-2 Advanced Capability (ADCAP) and included a new user interface.

During the summer of 2003, the US Coast Guard tested an Integrated Anti-swimmer System (IAS) which used an improved WQX-2 system. The much improved IAS included a reduced soundhead weight from 1,100 pounds (500 kg) to less than 200 pounds (91 kg). Based on "highly successful testing", the Coast Guard bought the systems and deployed them for operational use.

== See also ==
- List of military electronics of the United States
