= Multi-Agency Centre =

Intelligence-sharing centre under India's Intelligence Bureau

The Multi-Agency Centre (MAC) is an intelligence fusion and coordination centre functioning under the Intelligence Bureau (IB) of the Ministry of Home Affairs, Government of India. It serves as India's apex platform for real-time intelligence sharing and coordination among central and state agencies involved in intelligence, security, defence and law enforcement.

As of 2026, the MAC brings together 28 central and state agencies for the exchange of counter-terrorism and national-security information. It is supported by Subsidiary Multi-Agency Centres (SMACs) across the states and union territories, which process local intelligence and coordinate with state police and other field agencies.

== History ==
The Multi-Agency Centre was established in 2001 as part of reforms to India's intelligence and national-security system following the Kargil War and the subsequent Kargil Review Committee and Group of Ministers reviews.

The Intelligence Bureau was authorised to establish the centre in New Delhi to improve the exchange and coordination of intelligence collected by different central and state organisations. An annual report of the Ministry of Home Affairs for 2008–09 stated that MAC had been created and operationalised within the Intelligence Bureau in Delhi, and that participating intelligence agencies, state governments and union territories were expected to exchange intelligence through the system.

Subsidiary Multi-Agency Centres were subsequently established to extend the intelligence-sharing system to the states. Following the 2008 Mumbai attacks, the MAC-SMAC system was strengthened to facilitate faster sharing of intelligence between central and state agencies.

By 2015, the government stated that MAC had been strengthened and reorganised to operate continuously on a 24-hour basis for the real-time collation and sharing of intelligence between central intelligence agencies and state governments.

== Organisation and functions ==
MAC is housed within the Intelligence Bureau and functions as an inter-agency intelligence-sharing platform rather than as a separate investigative agency. Its principal function is the collation, assessment and dissemination of intelligence received from participating central and state organisations.

The MAC framework includes intelligence, security, defence, investigative and law-enforcement organisations. According to the Government of India in 2026, 28 central and state agencies participate in the network.

MAC operates continuously to enable proactive and real-time sharing of actionable intelligence among participating agencies and operational authorities. In a July 2024 review of the centre, the Ministry of Home Affairs described MAC as a platform intended to bring together intelligence agencies, law-enforcement organisations, anti-narcotics agencies and cyber-security organisations.

=== Subsidiary Multi-Agency Centres ===
Subsidiary Multi-Agency Centres (SMACs) form the state and union-territory level component of the MAC network. They process intelligence generated at the local level and provide coordination between the national MAC network, state police organisations and other field agencies.

The expansion of the MAC-SMAC network has progressively extended secure intelligence sharing to districts and operational units, including areas with difficult terrain and limited connectivity.

== Modernisation ==
In July 2024, the Ministry of Home Affairs announced a major technical and operational revamp of the MAC framework intended to increase its reach and effectiveness. The proposed modernisation included greater use of big data, artificial intelligence and machine learning for intelligence analysis.

On 16 May 2025, Union Home Minister Amit Shah inaugurated the upgraded Multi-Agency Centre at North Block in New Delhi. The new MAC network was implemented at a cost of more than ₹500 crore (US$52 million) and incorporated new hardware, software and analytical capabilities.

The upgraded system incorporates artificial-intelligence and machine-learning techniques for analysing information contained within MAC databases, together with geographic information system (GIS) capabilities. The system is intended to support functions including trend analysis, hotspot mapping, timeline analysis and other forms of intelligence assessment.

The modernised MAC network connects intelligence, security, law-enforcement and investigative agencies through a secure standalone network. The expanded network provides connectivity to island territories, insurgency-affected regions and mountainous high-altitude areas, with connectivity extending to district-level police authorities.

In June 2026, the Government of India described MAC as the country's apex real-time intelligence-sharing and coordination platform and stated that the technological upgrade had improved hardware infrastructure, network capabilities and AI- and ML-enabled analytical tools.

== Cyber Multi-Agency Centre ==
The Ministry of Home Affairs established the Cyber Multi-Agency Centre (CyMAC) on 22 January 2025 under the MAC framework.

CyMAC provides a dedicated mechanism for real-time coordination and intelligence sharing relating to cybersecurity threats. Its areas of focus include cyber espionage, threats involving emerging technologies and other cyber risks affecting national security.

== Coordination on fugitive cases ==
In October 2025, the Ministry of Home Affairs proposed strengthening coordination between the Intelligence Bureau and the Central Bureau of Investigation through MAC in relation to fugitive offenders. The proposal included the establishment of a joint mechanism for coordinating cases involving fugitives and extradition proceedings.

In January 2026, a Standing Focus Group was constituted under the Multi-Agency Centre to strengthen coordination in fugitive cases. The group was tasked with prioritising cases, standardising dossiers, identifying information gaps, maintaining follow-up with foreign authorities and assisting cases initiated by state agencies.

== Intelligence integration ==
The MAC-SMAC network forms part of India's broader intelligence-sharing architecture alongside systems such as the National Intelligence Grid (NATGRID). While MAC primarily provides an institutional framework for inter-agency intelligence coordination, NATGRID provides authorised agencies with access to information drawn from multiple government databases.

The Ministry of Home Affairs has sought to integrate additional databases maintained by different central agencies with the modernised MAC platform in order to expand its analytical capabilities and enable more integrated intelligence assessment.

== See also ==
- Intelligence Bureau (India)
- National Intelligence Grid
- National Investigation Agency
- Research and Analysis Wing
- Defence Intelligence Agency (India)
- List of Indian intelligence agencies
- List of counter-terrorism agencies
