= Defense against swimmer incursions =

Methods of protection from incursions by divers and swimmers

Defenses against swimmer incursions are security methods developed to protect watercraft, ports and installations, and other sensitive resources in or near vulnerable waterways from potential threats or intrusions by swimmers or scuba divers.

== Risks and threats ==
The need for military underwater security was demonstrated in World War II by the achievements of frogmen against armed forces facilities such as the Italian frogman actions in WWII. Since the late 1950s, the increasing demand for and availability of sophisticated scuba diving equipment has also created concerns about protecting valuable underwater archaeology sites and shellfish fishing stocks.

The 12 October 2000 USS Cole bombing was not carried out by underwater divers, but did bring renewed attention to the vulnerability they present for naval ships. Divers can swim 100 to 200 yards in about three minutes, and large sonar ranges would be required around ships for security forces to detect underwater swimmers in time to make an effective response.

In March 2005 the Philippine military, while interrogating a captured anti-government terrorist bomber, found that two of Southeast Asia's most dangerous terrorist organizations linked to al-Qaeda were said to be jointly training militants in scuba diving for attacks at sea.

Swimmers can approach from the surface or underwater, each presenting its own detection and deterrence challenges. The interception and apprehension of intruders detected in bodies of water pose unique safety risks.

Zones of operations include:

- Underwater.
- At the surface of water.
- In small boats.
- In larger vessels.
- Apprehension of suspected frogmen onshore, before or after they dive.

Potential theaters of operation:

- In an enclosed security area, e.g. a harbor.
- In open water to protect submerged artifacts (usually undersea archaeological sites).
- In open water (often on a frontier) to prevent smuggling.
- In open water to protect sea life. (This, on a small scale, may be defined to include various known unofficial actions by inshore fishermen to protect their shellfish stocks.)

== Recreational divers and underwater security ==
Maintaining underwater security against intrusion on or under the water has been complicated by the expansion of recreational scuba diving since the mid-1950s, making it unacceptable in most democracies to use potentially lethal methods against any suspicious underwater sighting or sonar echo in areas not officially closed to recreational divers. Routine investigation of all "unidentified frogman" reports would be swamped by reports of recreational divers who were not in military areas.

For a long time it would be easy for diving professionals and other experienced divers to distinguish a sport diver with an open-circuit scuba such as an aqualung from a combat frogman with a rebreather; and legitimate civilian divers are normally fairly easy to detect because they dive from land or from a surface boat, rarely or never from an underwater craft, and willingly advertise their presence for their own safety; but recent multiplication in sport rebreather use may have changed that somewhat.

In the past, when scuba diving was less common, many non-divers—including police, patrol, and guards—knew little about diving and did not know of this difference in diving gear, but described all divers as "frogmen". One result was an incident in the inter-ethnic crisis in Cyprus in 1974 when a tourist was arrested for suspected spying because "frogman's kit" was found in his car; it was ordinary sport scuba gear.

After about 1990, the rapid growth in the number of sport diving rebreather brands has clouded this distinction, while advanced sport divers increasingly tackle longer, deeper, riskier dives using equipment once available only to armed forces or professionals. This means that even techniques for trapping them underwater, disorienting them, or forcing them to the surface would be an unacceptable risk to civilian divers' lives.

Another result of sport diving is a risk of civilians independently re-developing, and then using or selling on the free market, technologies, such as technical advances in underwater communications equipment, formerly kept as military secrets.

There have been incidents which have demonstrated poor underwater security, such as when a sport diver with a noisy, bubbly, open-circuit scuba and no combat training entered a naval anchorage and signed his name on the bottom of a warship.

== Detection ==
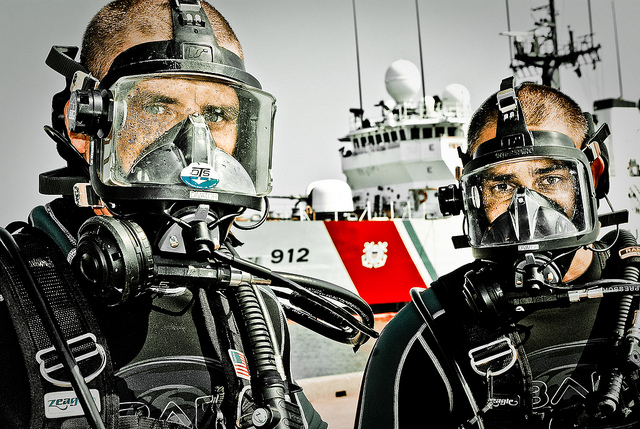
Maritime law enforcement specialists at Regional Dive Locker East in Portsmouth, Va., prepare for a training dive

The Maritime Safety and Security Team (MSST) is a United States Coast Guard harbor and inshore patrol and security team who specialize in Naval Security. They performed underwater inspections of piers and ships, underwater investigations, ship husbandry, aids to navigation (ATON) operations, archaeological surveys, and search/recovery missions.

Maritime Security Response Team (MSRT) is the Department of Homeland Security's premier counterterrorism and high-risk maritime law enforcement unit. It is the only counterterrorism unit authorized and equipped to arrest submerged divers as part of its underwater port security mission.

Besides the visual detection by guards, a number of other systems are also used by security forces to prevent infiltration by frogmen.

=== Underwater ===
Ultrasound detection
Artificial intelligence and electronic neural networks and developments in ultrasound have made possible specialized diver-detector sonars.

Examples of diver-detecting active sonar systems are:

- AN/WQX-2 – Diver detection sonar used in defense against underwater incursions
- Cerberus (sonar) – Diver detection device
- Underwater Port Security System – Defense against hostile swimmer incursions

Trained animals
Trained dolphins and sea lions can find submerged divers. Both can see, and hear direction of sound, well underwater, and dolphins have natural sonar.
The United States Navy’s MK6 Marine Mammal System is supported by SPAWAR and uses dolphins to find and mark mines and divers in the water. This system was used in:
- Vietnam in 1970–71.
- Persian Gulf in 1987–1988.
- San Diego harbor for security during the 1996 Republican National Convention.

Remote-controlled underwater vehicles
A remotely operated underwater vehicle (ROV) could search for submerged divers; but ROVs are expensive to run, and as technology is now could not attack several targets one after another as quickly as a marine mammal.
An underwater ROV needs to be controlled. It could find and identify divers, and perhaps deter them. It should not be easily overpowered or attacked or outpaced by the suspect divers. If it is to attack the suspects, it should carry a suitable weapon.

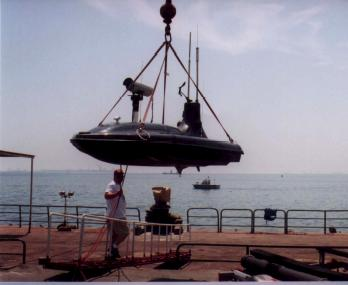
"OWL"-type surface ROV (also known as the Unmanned Harbor Security Vehicle) used to search for submerged divers

Surface ROV
A surface ROV can move on its own and scan below itself with sonar, but without a long-range weapon it can do little against deeply submerged suspect divers.

== Surveillance of civilian divers ==
A few sources claim the FBI asked the US's largest scuba diver certification organizations to turn over the records of all divers certified since 1998; this turning-over is now done once a year.

== Anti-frogman weapons ==
=== Sound ===
The main effects of ultrasound on the human body are heating and cavitation. Analysis of research literature related to effects of ultrasound concluded that reported ultrasound-caused organ damage was associated with sound pressure levels exceeding a certain intensity threshold, regardless of frequency The UPSS/IAS diver-detector sonar system includes an underwater shockwave emitter.

Westminster International have implemented audible sound based defense systems. These systems irritate or cause pain to the target's ears. Diver aversion to low frequency sound is dependent upon sound pressure level and center frequency.

=== Underwater firearms ===
Underwater firearms fire a steel rod, not a bullet, for better range underwater. They are all more powerful than a speargun, and can fire several shots before reloading. Their barrels are not rifled; the fired projectile is kept in line underwater by hydrodynamic effects, and is somewhat inaccurate when fired out of water.

=== Explosives ===
Hand launched depth charges have been developed to specifically target divers. They typically contain a high explosive charge of 250-500g and a hydrostatic fuze that operates at a predetermined depth. The Spanish LM-2 and Italian DC103 DSC are examples.

=== Other underwater man-carried weapons ===
- For a long time the diver's standard weapon and tool has been a heavy knife.
- A catalog issued in 1991 by Life Support Engineering (now Mercury Products) contained several military / commando type diving kit items and also a compressed-air powered speargun.
- Underwater, a baton would have to be used for thrusting or jabbing, not swung, due to water resistance, and designed accordingly. The target's solar plexus will probably be protected by his diving gear.

=== Trained animals ===
The United States Navy has deployed sea lions to detect divers in the Persian Gulf. The sea lion is trained to detect the diver, connect a marker buoy to his leg by a C-shaped handcuff-like clamp, surface, and then bark loudly to raise the alarm. 20 sea lions have been trained for this at the US Naval Warfare Systems Center in San Diego. Some have been flown to Bahrain to help the Harbor Patrol Unit to guard the US Navy's 5th Fleet. Sea lions adapt easily to warm water, can dive repeatedly and swim up to 25 mph, can see in near-darkness, and can determine the direction of underwater sound. In training the sea lions have been known to chase divers onto land.

From 1970 to 1980 trained dolphins killed two Soviet frogmen who were putting limpet mines on a US cargo ship in Cam Ranh bay in Vietnam. Subsequently, Soviet PDSS frogmen were trained to fight back against trained dolphins. In an incident on the coast of Nicaragua, PDSS frogmen killed trained anti-frogman dolphins. The arrival of underwater rifles and pistols has likely reduced the threat of trained animals.

Animals, unlike ROVs etc., need to be fed and kept in training whether they are needed at work or not, and cannot be laid aside in a storeroom until needed.

=== Remote-controlled underwater vehicle, as weapon ===
A ROV, as well as searching, could be equipped to arrest or attack divers on command, but with their technology as it is could not attack several targets one after another as quickly as a marine mammal. A surface-only ROV would need a long-range weapon to be effective against deeply submerged suspect divers.

== Restriction and Prevention ==
=== Restricting public access to frogman-type diving gear, or to any diving gear ===
- Siebe Gorman had a policy in Great Britain until around 1956 of keeping prices of aqualungs too high for most civilians to afford; legal restrictions on exporting currency stopped people from importing cheaper foreign aqualungs. See Timeline of underwater technology#Public interest in scuba diving takes off for how this barrier broke down, starting with British sport divers making their own aqualungs from ex-RAF cylinders and converted Calor gas regulators.
- The Subskimmer, which is useful for covert underwater penetration, took decades to develop and passed through at least three firms and is still too expensive for sport divers and sport diving centers.
- Siebe Gorman consistently refused to sell rebreathers to the civilian public. Mixture rebreather development was kept away from the public eye and the sport scuba trade until the end of the Cold War in 1991. As a result, when North Sea Oil exploration started in the 1960s, the oil drilling firms needing deep-dive work had to develop nitrox diving techniques independently, from concept up, without using the Royal Navy's know-how; and then the Navy revealed that they had used nitrox diving (which the Navy called "mixture") before 1945.
- In the US, military rebreathers were not marketed to the public primarily due to cost and attendant legal liability issues. Legal issues still tend to discourage the development and sale of the rebreather in the US, though acceptance and use is growing. The US military has not tried to stop sales of rebreathers to the public in the US. It has realized that recreational SCUBA has now exceeded earlier military SCUBA in quality, and hopes that a similar increase in quality and decrease in price will come from commercial-off-the-shelf rebreather equipment.

=== Prevention technology ===
Technology exists where underwater speaker systems can be deployed around the designated area. This array of speaker systems can be programmed to send high powered frequencies which then blasts powerful 'disruption' signals into the water. The frequencies have a maximum disorientation effect on the diver(s), which induce discomfort or panic causing them to leave the area or surface for interception. In cases where the divers remain in the water, the frequencies are likely to have a continued adverse effect which could cause sickness and confusion.

=== Preventing public access to water ===
For sport divers and similar who have no means of covert entry, one method is merely to try to stop all divers from reaching water, or stopping them from using boats, in some particular place or area. Such a bylaw may be called for by the military to keep sport divers away from secret underwater sites, or by inshore fishermen to stop alleged poaching of shellfish.

The US has made many such regulations to protect such infrastructure as power plant and nuclear plant water intakes and discharges, bridge foundations, harbor and pier installations, and naval facilities.

Yugoslavia forbade all sport diving except a few government-controlled groups, and required official permission for each campaign of archaeological or scientific diving.
