= Republic of Korea Navy Special Warfare Flotilla =

Special warfare unit of Republic of Korea Navy

- 대한민국 해군 특수전전단
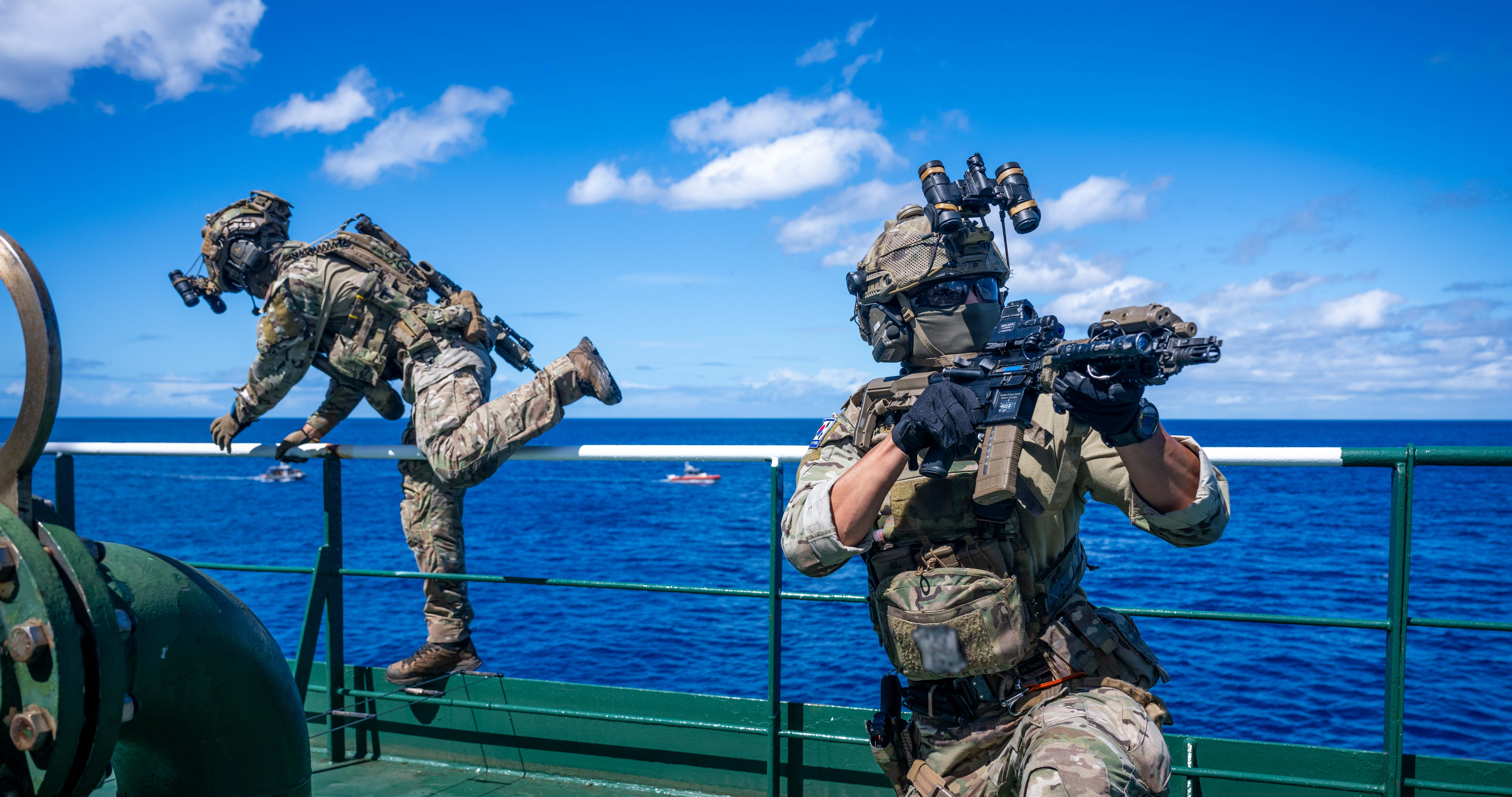
- Operators climb onto a ship during visit, board, search and seizure (VBSS) training during exercise RIMPAC 2024
- Active: 25 November 1955 – present
- Country: South Korea
- Branch: Republic of Korea Navy
- Type: Special operations force
- Role: Special operations
- Part of: Republic of Korea Fleet Command
- Garrison/HQ: Jinhae, South Korea
- Engagements: Vietnam War; War on terror; OEF – Horn of Africa; Operation Dawn of Gulf of Aden

Commanders
- Current commander: Brig. Gen. Yoo Jae-man

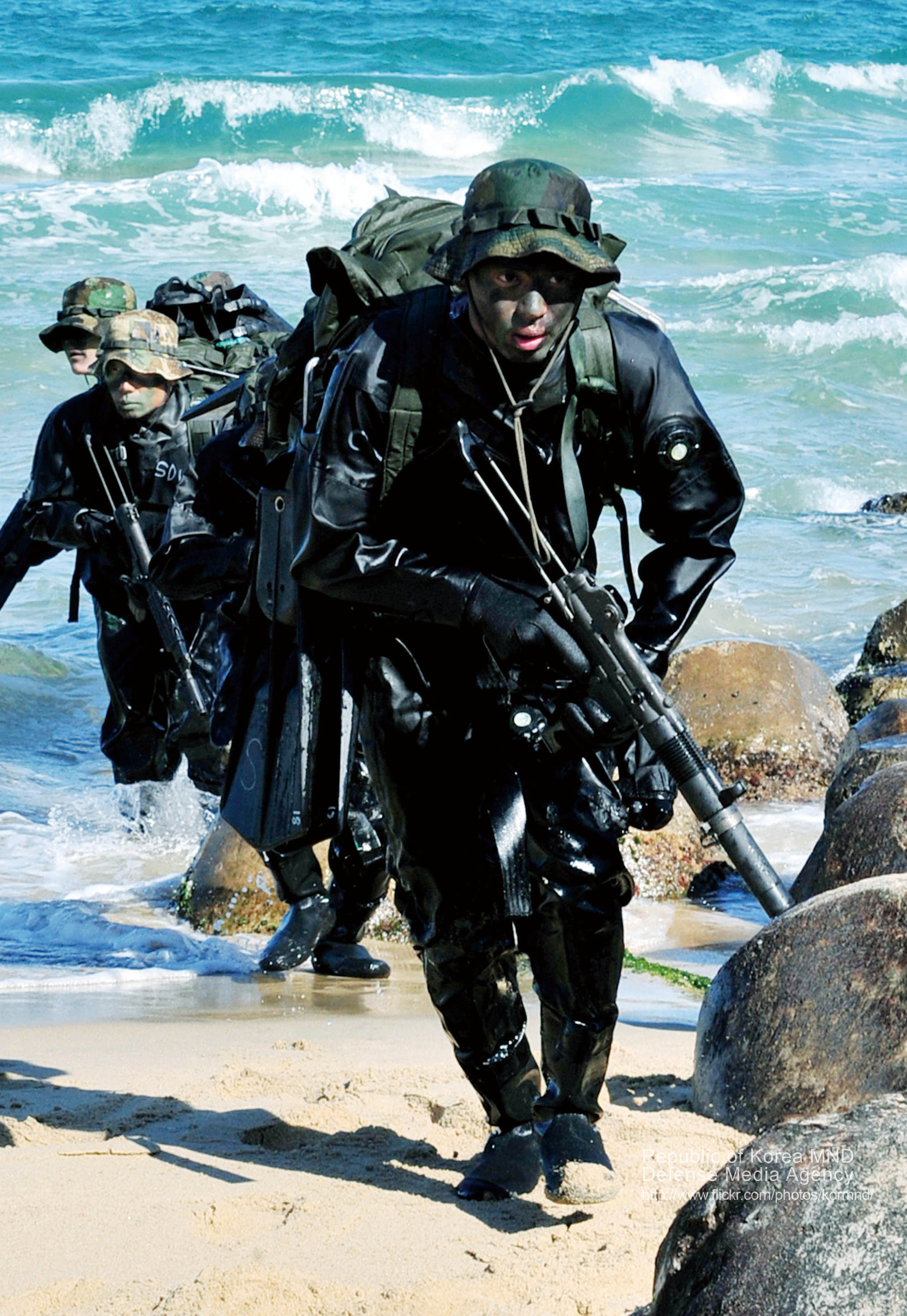
Special Warfare Troops operators

The Republic of Korea Navy Special Warfare Flotilla, (Note: (Korean: 대한민국 해군 특수전전단; Hanja: 大韓民國 海軍 特殊戰戰團)) abbreviated as WARFLOT, is a special operations force of the Republic of Korea Navy. It is commonly referred to as the Underwater Demolition Team or UDT, and sometimes as UDT/SEALs, coming from the fact UDTs are the most prominent branch of the flotilla and their close ties with US Navy SEALs.

The UDT/SEALs under WARFLOT are heavily influenced and inspired by the United States Navy SEALs/Underwater Demolition Team/Special Boat Teams, which initially provided funding and expertise in the unit's creation, and still maintain a strong relationship by regularly undertaking joint combined exchange training (JCET) several times a year, utilizing American helicopter and maritime assets, and enrolling students each year in the U.S. Naval Special Warfare programs at Naval Special Warfare Center such as Naval Small Craft Instruction and Technical Training School and Special Missions Training Center school.

== Organization ==
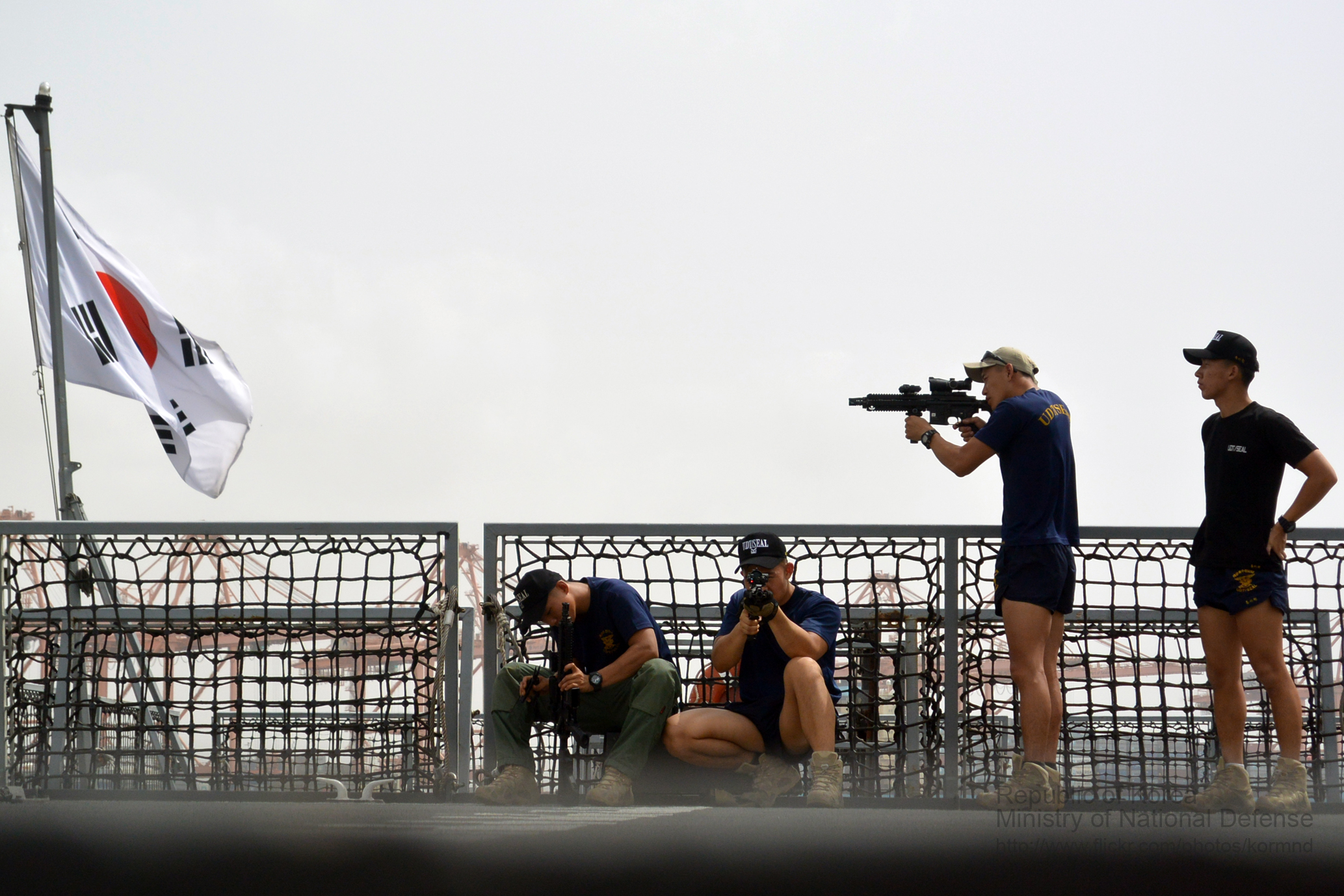
WARFLOT operators in 2013. The operators consist of the Cheonghae Unit, an anti-piracy and counter-terrorist task force.

Naval Special Warfare Flotilla - headquartered in Jinhae:

- Special Mission Squadrons - established January 1st, 2023
  - Counter-Terrorism Unit (CT)
  - Explosive Ordnance Disposal Unit (EOD)
  - Naval Pre-Operation Unit
- Naval Special Warfare Group (UDT/SEAL)
  - 1st Battalion
  - 3rd Battalion
  - 5th Battalion
  - Special Warfare Education and Training Battalion
- Sea Salvage & Rescue Unit (SSU)
- Operational Support Battalion
- Special Boat Unit
- Duty Support Squadron

=== Applicants and selection ===
The Special Warfare Troops (SWF) teams take applicants among conscripts, petty officers, and officers. Most petty officers and all conscripts now apply before basic training while officers apply after commissioning (NA, ROTC, or OCS), completion of Surface Warfare Officer School (SWOS), and after they have been assigned to a ship. The BUD/S (Basic Underwater Demolition/SEAL School) selection process is inspired by and similar to the U.S. Navy SEAL program, consisting of physical and mental challenges, such as Hell Week. The completion rate has been known to dip under 10% and usually hovers between 30 and 40%, leading to manpower problems as the unit continues to expand and has an increasing number of foreign commitments. Between 2010 and 2012 the completion rate was unusually high at 78.4%, which coincided with the unit's expansion.

Since 2010, most washouts have been retained as support personnel and equipment maintenance staff. Those who survive the first ten weeks are trained in open and closed circuit diving, demolition, land warfare and tactics before receiving the special warfare pin. It also includes learning to fight in close quarters under Multi UDT/SEAL Assaulting Tactics (MUSAT) training.

A SEAL/UDT team is made up of seven soldiers: a point man, a platoon leader, a communication expert, a machine gunner, a grenadier, an assistant leader, and rear security. Basic UDT/SEAL training is 10 weeks long for enlisted men and 20 to 26 weeks long for NCO and officers.

== History ==
=== Origins ===
The organization and operation of special operations units transmitted from the U.S. military during the Korean War directly influenced the ROK Navy’s special warfare capabilities. In February 1952, following the dissolution of the U.S. Reconnaissance Intelligence Unit (RIU), the ROK Navy planned the creation of its own reconnaissance intelligence unit. Consequently, in November 1952, the ROK Naval Intelligence District (NID) sent Lieutenant Kim Sung-kwon to the U.S. Navy’s B-6 course, the formal UDT training pipeline. At the time, the stated purpose for establishing the UDT was "assassination of key figures and intelligence gathering." Following Lt. Kim, 12 additional personnel were sent to the B-6 course in 1953 and 1954, laying the foundation for the ROK Navy UDT. On May 17, 1954, an Underwater Demolition Team was organized into four operational sections—Inland Reconnaissance, Coastal Reconnaissance, Underwater Reconnaissance, and Demolition—modeled after the U.S. UDT structure. On June 23 of that same year, the unit was formally established under the Coastal Unit of the ROK Fleet's 2nd Flotilla. On May 25, 1955, the ROK Fleet B-6 Training Unit (UDT detachment) was created, and on November 9, 1955, the first class of 26 men completed the course, marking the official inception of the ROK Navy UDT.

During the planning phase, ROK Navy leadership looked to the U.S. Navy UDT as the primary model, noting their distinguished contributions during WWII and the Korean War in performing critical strategies such as "coastal reconnaissance, intelligence acquisition, maritime reconnaissance, inland sabotage and assassination, underwater obstacle removal, mine detection/sweeping, guerrilla and VIP transport, special forces extraction support, and underwater demolition." To ensure the unit's success, priority was placed on establishing operational concepts through advanced U.S. training, developing a cadre of domestic instructors, and acquiring necessary equipment. From 1952, naval personnel with strong national values, English proficiency, and physical excellence were recruited or recommended. After passing English examinations administered by the U.S. 8th Army KMAG, they were sent to the U.S. B-6 course. The ROK Fleet UDT was ultimately launched with these U.S.-trained graduates as the core, led by the first UDT branch chief, Captain Jang In-pyo.

These B-6 graduates prepared for the ROK Fleet UDT by announcing recruitment through the Fleet Training Unit (STU) under the 2nd Flotilla. There were no strict prerequisites; any physically healthy naval serviceman could apply regardless of their rating. To attract applicants in an era of post-war recovery—where supplies, food, and clothing were scarce—the Navy offered special incentives, including status equivalent to a 3rd-class civilian official, guaranteed opportunities for U.S. training, and superior rations. These conditions generated significant interest. Over 300 sailors applied. After a two-day selection process involving physical fitness tests (push-ups, running) and swimming/underwater navigation tests in the harbor, 80 finalists were selected.

On August 5, 1955, the first UDT class entered training, beginning with "UDT gymnastics" on August 8. Initial training was conducted by the 2nd Flotilla’s training unit, focusing on physical conditioning and swimming due to a lack of equipment and instructional materials. Despite these shortages, the curriculum mirrored the U.S. UDT course, encompassing 13 weeks of intense training including physical conditioning, "Hell Week" (endurance training), running, swimming, diving, reconnaissance, demolition, and close-quarters combat. Notably, the SCUBA training conducted during this period was the first of its kind in South Korea, marking a significant milestone in the nation's diving history. Although trainees faced immense physical and mental challenges, the instructors—themselves graduates of the U.S. program—pushed them even harder than the U.S. standard to instill the spirit and passion of the UDT. On November 9, 1955, 26 men, led by Petty Officer Lee Man-soo, officially graduated as the first class of the ROK Navy UDT.

On November 9, 1955, concurrent with the graduation ceremony, the ROK Navy UDT was officially established under the Coastal Unit of the 2nd Flotilla, with Captain Jang In-pyo as the first commander, supported by 7 instructors and the 26 graduates of the 1st class, totaling 33 men.

Relationship with the Yeongdo Guerrilla Unit (Maritime Section) - The Maritime Section of the Yeongdo Guerrilla Unit served as the unofficial first Korean UDT and acted as the midwife for the official ROK Navy UDT.

The Yeongdo Guerrilla Unit was a unit that operated during the Korean War, with its headquarters and training ground on Yeongdo, Busan. It conducted air and sea infiltration missions into the Gangwon province and North/South Hamgyong provinces. Because they operated in the East Coast region, they were also known as the "East Coast Anti-Communist Volunteer Army." For a long time after the armistice, the unit’s records remained classified, leaving its affiliation unclear. While sometimes identified as a ROK military-controlled unit due to its commanders being active-duty captains, it was not widely known at the time—even to its leaders—that it was an agency under the U.S. Central Intelligence Agency (CIA).

The unit recruited primarily from residents of the three eastern provinces (North/South Hamgyong and Gangwon), though it also included refugees from other regions like Seoul and Pyongyang living in Busan or Geoje. Generally, they accepted young men who had defected to the South and had no remaining family to support. The Maritime Section was established around June 1951, as the previous practice of infiltrating large teams for long-term operations resulted in frequent loss of contact and low return rates; the strategy shifted to small-scale, short-term infiltration near the coastline. Starting as a small unit of 10 under commander Oh Bak, it grew to 58 personnel composed of veteran guerrillas and recruits from their own training center.

Among those who completed the guerrilla training, those skilled in swimming and boat handling were selected for the Maritime Section. They were trained by U.S. UDT Captain George Atcheson and Sergeant James C. "Joe" Pagnella, who taught them the 16-week U.S. UDT course. While not an enrollment in a formal U.S. military program, this was the first unofficial UDT training received by Koreans. Han In-seop, president of the Yeongdo Unit Veterans Association, testified that "when the formal ROK UDT was established, veterans from the Yeongdo Guerrilla Maritime Section were sent to support them as instructors."

Evolution - From 1955 (1st class) to 1970 (16th class), a total of 395 personnel completed UDT training. Of these, 63 were trainees from other military branches. Among the 332 ROK Navy personnel, 126 were transferred directly to the Naval Intelligence Unit following their training. In 1971, the UDT instructor group was reassigned to the Naval Intelligence Unit to establish an independent UDU training cadre. While the unit began separate recruitments for UDU in 1971, those who completed UDT training from the 1st to 16th classes prior to that year were either deployed for infiltration missions immediately upon completion or received orders to transfer to the Naval Intelligence Unit to carry out such missions after an interval of two to three years. Conversely, there were cases where personnel completed UDU training and subsequently retired from the UDT. Although the intelligence unit began its own internal agent training in 1971, those who completed the training in 1971 were not designated as "UDU 1st Class"; instead, they inherited the existing numbering sequence, becoming "UDU 17th Class."

=== June 23, 1968 incident ===
Fifteen South Korean secret agents, a team of three and two teams of six, were sent to the North on a mission to seize a North Korean naval vessel and to kidnap a key officer. But the mission failed because of miscommunication among the South Korean vessels and the commander's misjudgment. It was about 2 a.m. when the three South Korean vessels approached the bay from the Yellow Sea and met wired obstacles on the water, which made navigating harder. Without warning, the North Korean Navy started an attack that apparently killed six agents. The other nine South Korean agents returned safely to the South.

=== 1996 Gangneung submarine incident ===
SWF were involved in the 1996 Gangneung submarine infiltration incident caused by North Korean agents, on a mission to spy on the naval installations in the area and then return. The submarine made a failed attempt to collect the team on the 17th, and returned the following day. The submarine, however, ran aground in the attempt, and all efforts to try to make her free were in vain. A 49-day-long manhunt ensued, from 18 September through 5 November, resulting in the capture or elimination of all the crew and members of the reconnaissance team, except one, who is believed to have made it back to North Korea. Four civilians and 12 ROK soldiers (eight by firefight and four accidental) died; 27 soldiers were wounded.

=== 1998 Sokcho submarine incident ===
In 1998 the unit was involved in the recovery and search of a North Korean Yono-class submarine that had been accidentally snared in fishing nets near Sokcho, Gangwon Province. A South Korean fishing boat observed several submarine crewmen trying to untangle the submarine from the fishing net. The fishing boat notified the Republic of Korea Navy and a corvette towed the submarine with the crew still inside to a navy base at the port of Donghae. The submarine sank as it was being towed into port, it was unclear if this was as a result of damage or a deliberate scuttling by the crew.

=== Anti-piracy operations ===
Since 2009, the SWF have formed the core of the Cheonghae anti-piracy task group deployed to the coast of Somalia. In the early morning of January 22, 2011, as part of Operation Dawn of Gulf of Aden, 15 SWF operators boarded the 11,000-ton chemical freighter Samho Jewelry which was taken by 13 pirates 6 days prior; 21 sailors had been held hostages. ROKS Choi-Young, a 4600-ton destroyer, dispatched its SWF team at 4:58 am along with a Lynx helicopter which then circled the ship and fired machine guns to distract the pirates. The boarding party of 15 SWF killed 8 pirates and captured 5 without taking any casualties after 3 hours of intense firefighting. All 21 hostages were secured, with one hostage suffering a non-fatal gunshot wound to the abdomen.

=== Sinking of the MV Sewol ===
SWF provided 114 men that took part in the recovery operation during the sinking of the MV Sewol, during which 304, mostly high school students, perished.

== Cultural depictions ==
Steel Troops, dubbed a "military survival program", features male South Korean reservists who served in various special forces units across different branches of the Republic of Korea Armed Forces.

The Soldiers seeks to find the "best special forces operator in the world", beginning with selecting the best Korean special forces representatives through a series of missions.

== See also ==
- Republic of Korea Army Special Warfare Command
- 707th Special Mission Group
- 13th Special Mission Brigade
- United States Navy SEALs
- Naval Special Warfare Development Group
- Information Warfare Command
