= Cerberus (sonar) =

Diver detection device

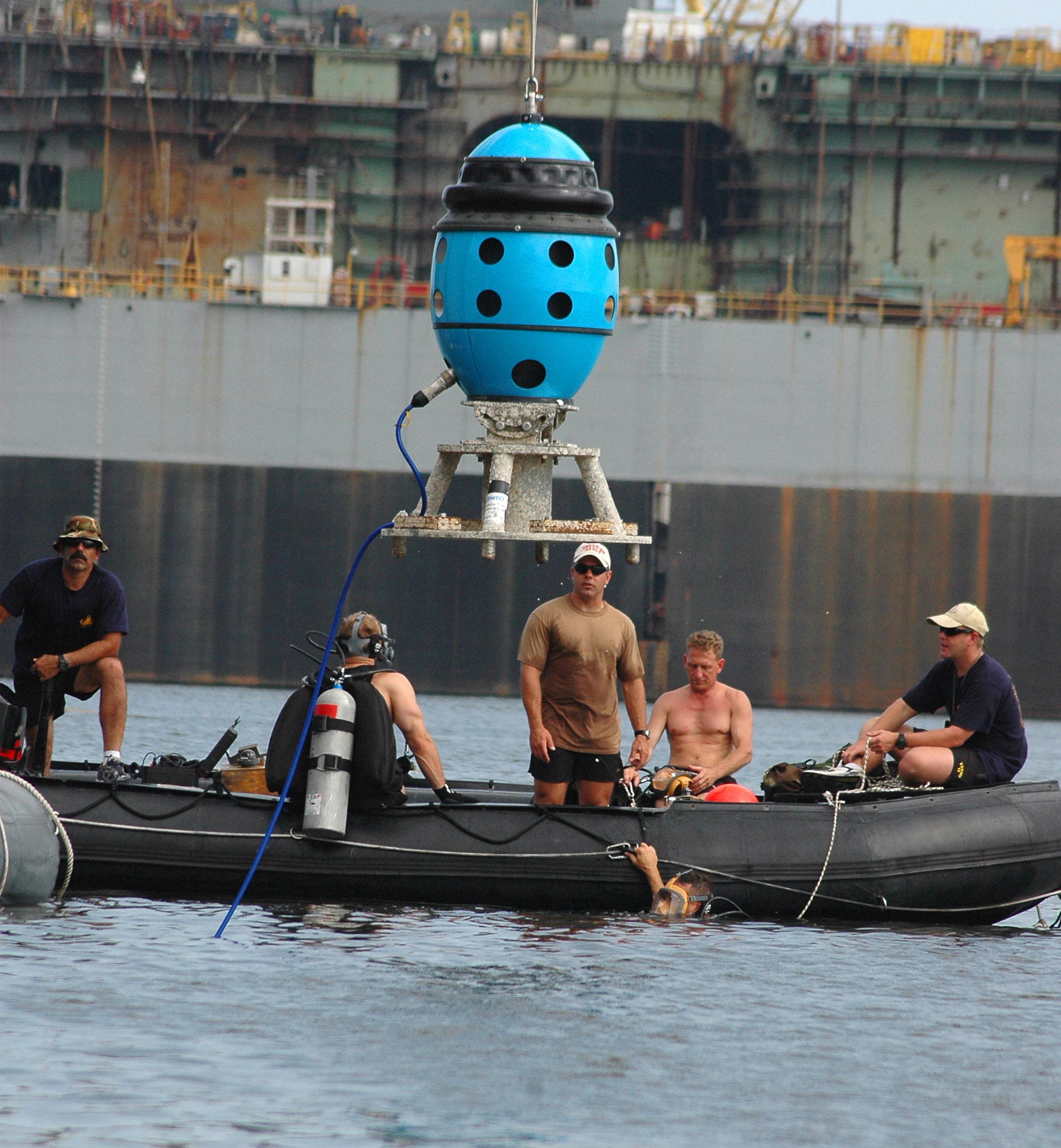
U.S. Navy sailors guiding a Cerberus Mod 1 Swimmer Detection System into the water at Naval Station Pascagoula.

Cerberus is an ultrasound diver detection sonar to detect submerged divers. Mod 1 was made by Qinetiq, in their underwater business division. It was unveiled at UDT 2003. The underwater division was sold to ATLAS ELEKTRONIK UK in 2009 and the Mod 2 version was developed by them. It is semi-intelligent and reportedly can detect an air-filled chest cavity underwater and let its operator tell whether the echo is from a man or something irrelevant such as a seal or dolphin, and to distinguish between: a shoal of fish; a ship's wake; a diver with an open-circuit scuba set; a stealth diver with a rebreather; flotsam and jetsam.

== Cerberus Diver Detection Sonar (Mod 2) ==
The Cerberus DDS system can detect open circuit divers, closed circuit divers, and underwater vehicles (e.g. swimmer delivery vehicles) with a high rate of accuracy. It has the ability to differentiate divers from marine life and other contacts. It can process thousands of contacts on each ping.

The Cerberus system is available in two variants; configured for shipboard deployment or as a fixed system for port and harbour protection. The portfolio includes a range of optional equipment that enables the user to configure their installation appropriately.

The system has a 360° coverage with an area detection of up to 4.5km^{2} dependent on the acoustic environment. The GUI can display 50 tracks simultaneously and, once a threat has been identified, raise an audible and visual alarm to allow the user to take precautionary action.

== See also ==
- Defense against swimmer incursions – Methods of protection from incursions by divers and swimmers
