= National Intelligence Organization (Papua New Guinea) =

State intelligence agency of Papua New Guinea

The National Intelligence Organization (NIO) is the intelligence agency of Papua New Guinea.

It was established by the National Intelligence Organization Act, an Act of Parliament in 1984. As defined by the Act (art.7), the Organization's functions are to "collect, collate and process intelligence information", and provide the authorities with "timely, accurate and impartial assessments, forecasts and reports in respect of–

(a) matters affecting the maintenance of good order in the country; and
(b) the combating of seditious enterprises, espionage and sabotage and the provision of warning of potential military attack, armed incursions into the territory of Papua New Guinea or the use of military pressures against Papua New Guinea; and
(c) the preservation of national sovereignty and the detection of any attempts by a foreign power or person to engage in political, military or economic activities contrary to Papua New Guinea’s interests; and
(d) the prospects for world and regional, political, economic and social stability insofar as these could have implications for, or could affect, Papua New Guinea; and
(e) future trends of the availability of resources and of prices as these could have implications for Papua New Guinea."

The NIO is headed by a Director-General of Intelligence, appointed by the Head of State (the King, whose duties are exercised by the Governor General), who appoints him or her acting on the advice of the Prime Minister, after consultation with the Leader of the Opposition. (art.8(1)(a))

The Act specifies that, before authorising the NIO to "collect intelligence information outside the country by other than overt means", the Director-General must obtain written authorisation from the Prime Minister. (art.12)

The NIO may not search any person or premises, nor subject any person or premises to listening devices, nor access or intercept a person's post, without a warrant delivered by the National Security Council, which consists in the Prime Minister and various Cabinet Ministers. (part VI)

The identity of the Organization's agents and employees (other than the Director-General) is to be kept secret, and divulging the identity of any such agent or employee is an offence. (art.47)

The Organization is currently operational, and the key findings of its reports are occasionally made public and commented on in the media. In 2013, Prime Minister Peter O'Neill appointed former police commissioner Gari Baki to lead the NIC, and to revive it as it had become "run down". O'Neill added that Papua New Guinea was now working with "some intelligence friends from Israel" so as to "beef up our intelligence gathering activities".
