= Counter Terrorism Department =

Counter Terrorism Department may refer to:

- Counter Terrorism Department (Pakistan)
- Counter Terrorism Department (Kurdistan Region)

== See also ==
- Counter-Terrorism Service
- Counterterrorism
