= Military Police (Republic of Korea) =

South Korean military law enforcement service

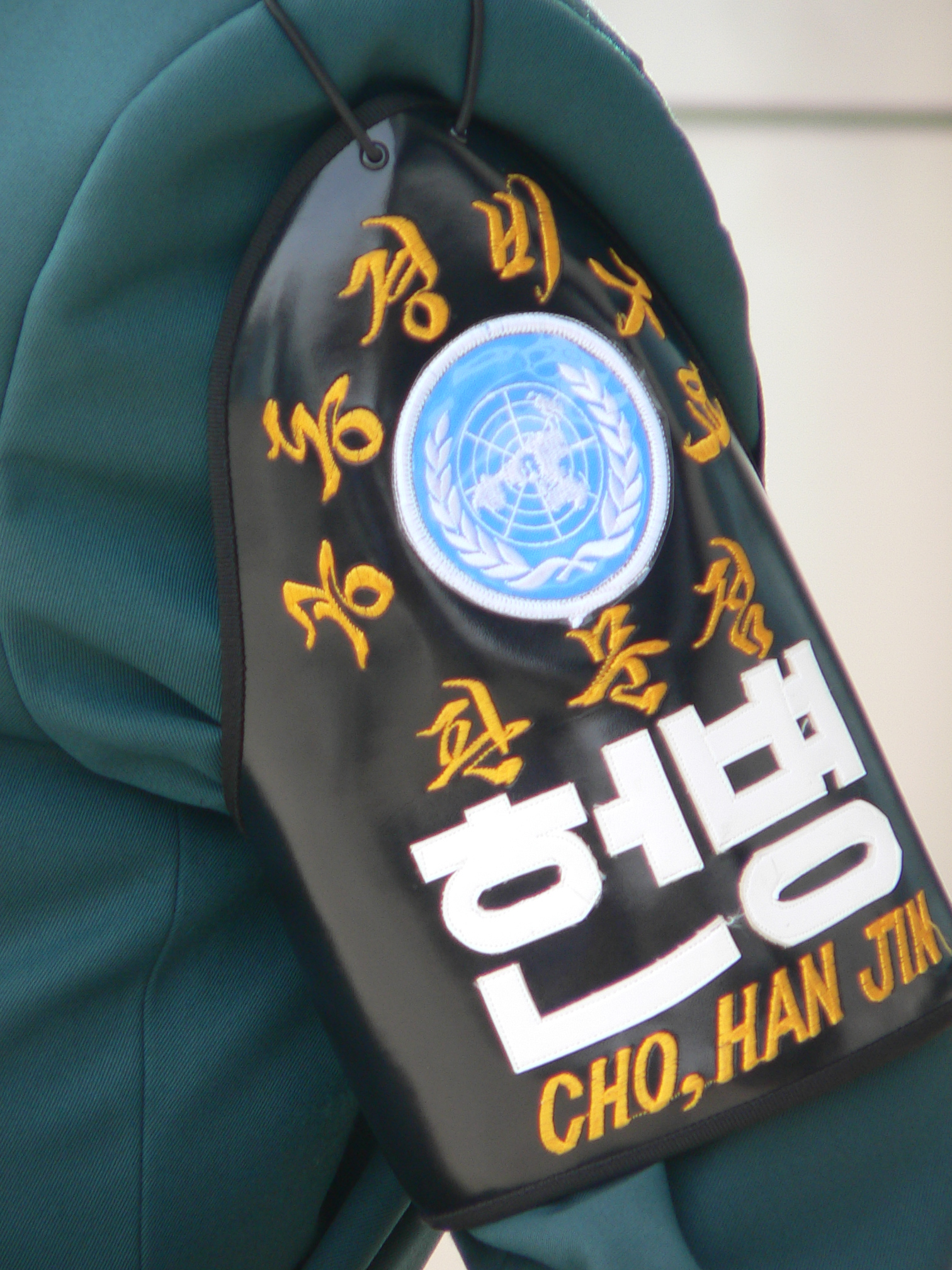
Republic of Korea Military Police arm band. The hangul from top to bottom reads: 'Joint Security Area', 'Panmunjeom' and 'Military Police' respectively.

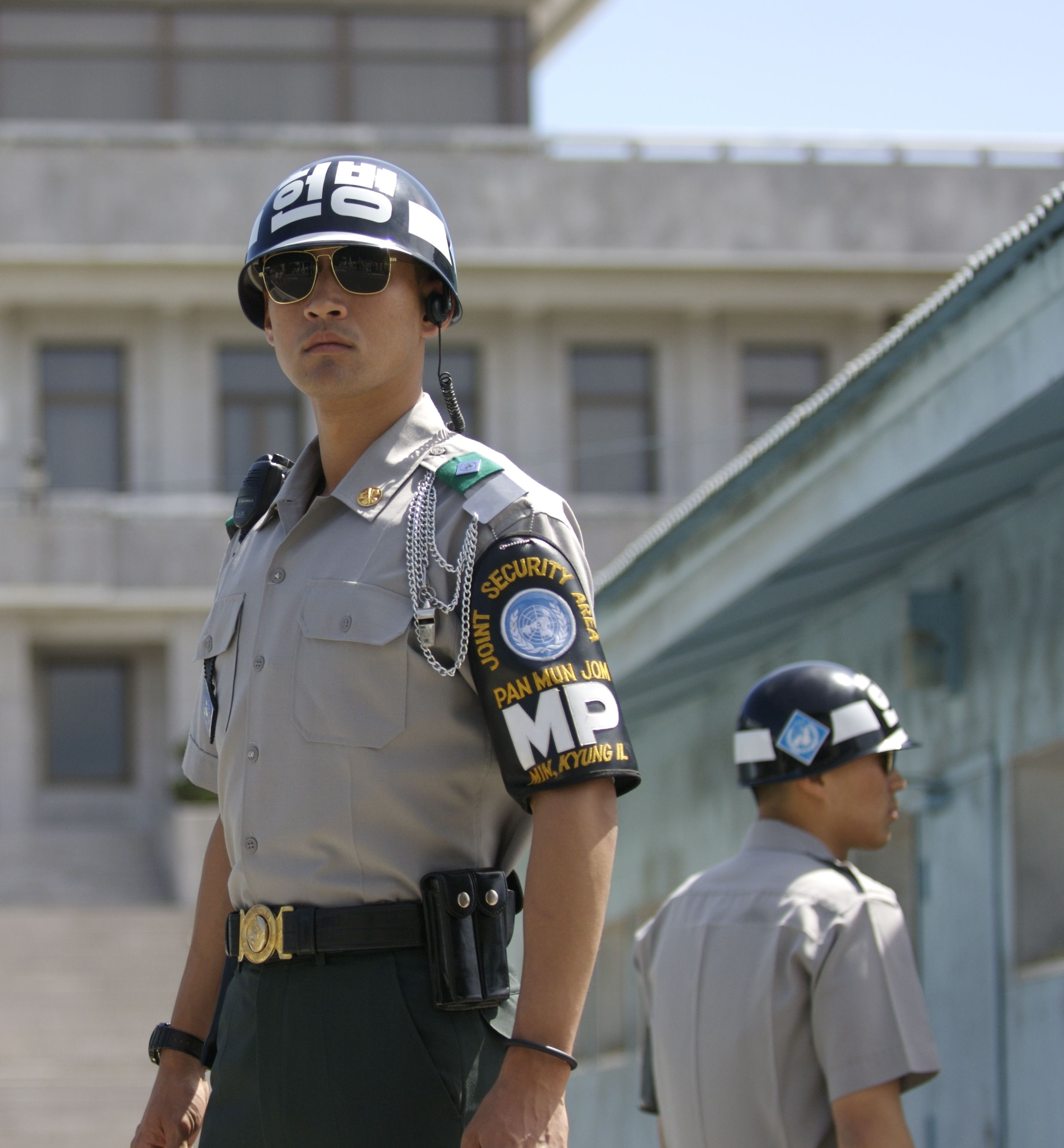
South Korea military police in Joint Security Area

The Republic of Korea Military Police (ROK MP; Korean: 대한민국 국군 군사경찰; Hanja: 大韓民國國軍軍事警察; RR: Daehanminguk Gukgun Gunsagyeongchal), are the uniformed law enforcement agencies of each respective branch of the Republic of Korea Armed Forces. Once operated under a unified Military Police Command (헌병총사령부; 憲兵總司令部; heonbyeong chongsa ryeongbu) between 1953 and 1960, the ROK's MP units are now commanded by the Army, Navy, Marines and Air Force HQs separately. However, despite the confusion, ROK Army MPs strictly do not function as border guards at the Korean Demilitarized Zone (DMZ).

== DMZ guards ==
All ROK troops guarding and patrolling inside the DMZ wears military police armband, although they are mainly members of army's infantry or light infantry units. (Reconnaissance Battalion/Company. The ones deployed in the JSA are members of the United Nations Command Security Battalion). The reason why these soldiers wear MP armbands(of which are currently retired by the Army MPs) is because the armistice that was signed in 1953 that ended the Korean War requires both sides (the North and the South) to restrict access inside the DMZ to MPs only, which means no vehicles, no squad-served weapons (such as mortars and HMGs) and no regular units of the army.

== Main role ==
The Republic of Korea Army Military Polices' main role is to maintain security and order within the barracks, and also serves as gate guards for the base, and guards the checkpoints to keep watch for intruders. Since its main role is a police force within the military, they have motorized units which consists of motorcycles and other police vehicles to patrol the area that they are assigned to. However, in the 1990s, with the continued increase of the threats from their northern counterparts, the Ministry of National Defense assigned a special operations team within the Military Police, which is the Republic of Korea Army Military Police Special Duty Team, also known as the SDT.

== Equipment ==
The ROK MP has the following small arms in their inventory:

- K1A assault carbine
- K2 assault rifle
- K5 semi-automatic pistol
- K14 bolt-action sniper rifle
- Various revolvers of U.S. origin

== See also ==
- Military Police
- Law enforcement in South Korea
- Immigration to South Korea
