= 707th Special Mission Group =

South Korean special forces unit

707th Special Mission Battalion (1981–2019); 707th Special Mission Group (2019–present)
- 제707특수임무단
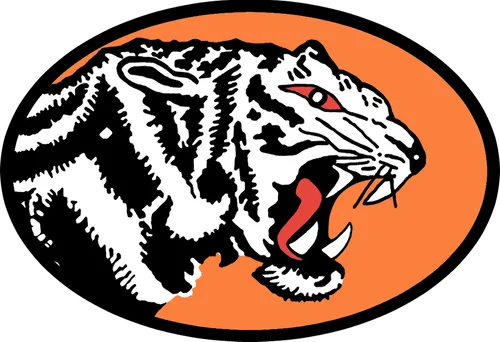
- 707th SMG patch.
- Active: 17 April 1981 – present
- Country: South Korea
- Branch: Republic of Korea Army
- Type: Special forces
- Size: Group
- Part of: ROKA Special Warfare Command
- Garrison/HQ: Classified
- Nickname: White Tiger
- Mottos: 행동으로 논리를 대변하고, 결과로써 과정을 입증한다; Represent logic with action, prove the process with results
- Engagements: War on terror; Operation Enduring Freedom; 2024 South Korean martial law crisis

Commanders
- Current commander: Classified

The 707th Special Mission Group (Korean: 제707특수임무단; Hanja: 第707特殊任務團; RR: Je 707 Teugsu-immudan) is a general-purpose special forces unit of the Republic of Korea Army Special Warfare Command (ROK-SWC).

== History ==
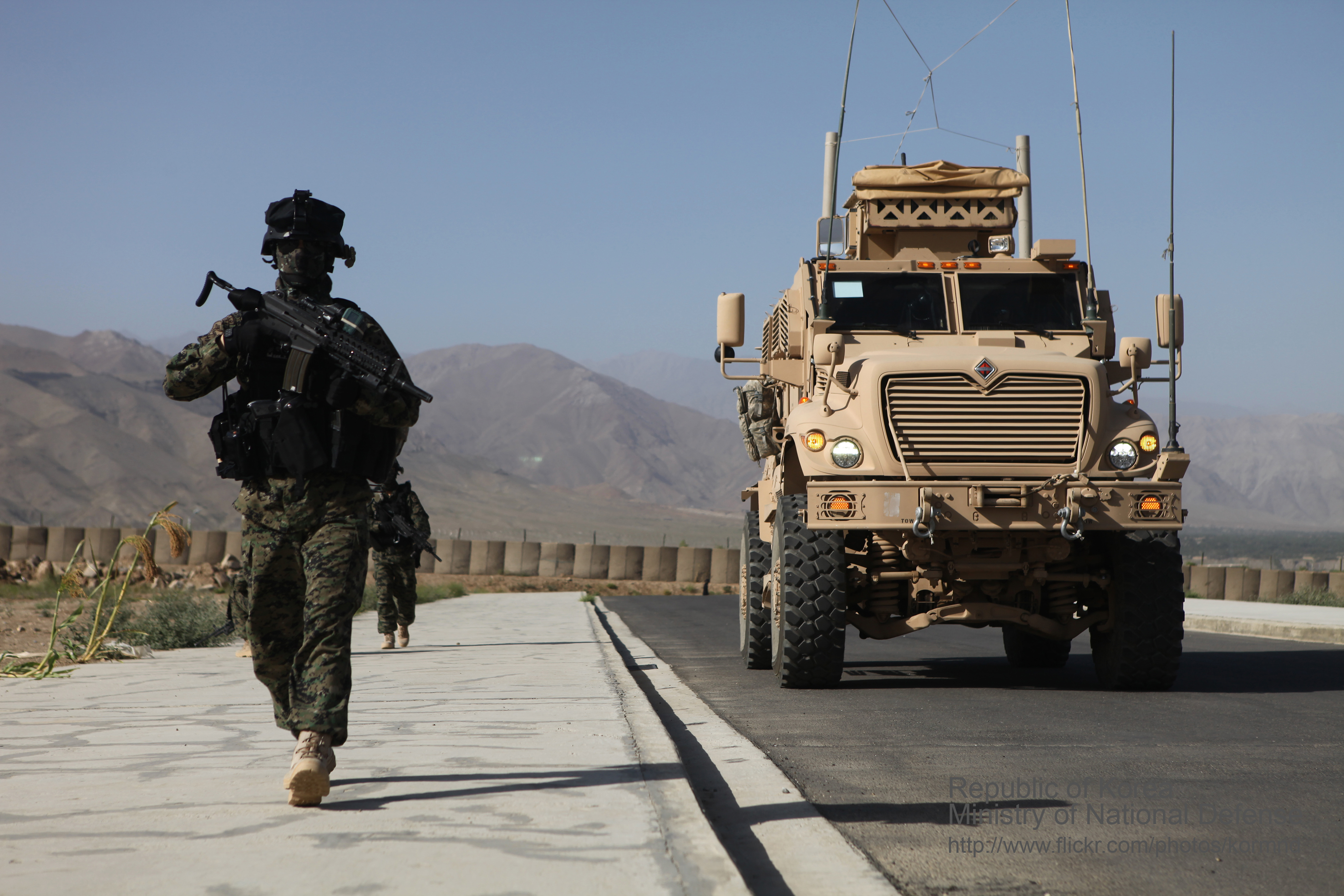
QRF ROK 707th Ashena Unit in Afghanistan

The unit was formed after the Munich massacre, which forced the South Korean government to create a counterterrorism and hostage rescue unit in time for the 1988 Olympics that would be held in South Korea.

In 1984, B Squadron of Delta Force traveled to South Korea to conduct training with the 707th.

During February 2019, the former 707th Special Mission Battalion was reorganized and renamed as the 707th Special Mission Group (제707특수임무단) with additional personnel and equipment to ensure higher readiness against various threats. It is now commanded by a Colonel instead of a Lieutenant Colonel.

Since 2011, the 707th Special Mission Group has maintained a presence in the United Arab Emirates as part of the South Korean Special Forces contingent, named 'Akh Unit,' deployed there to train local forces.

=== 1982 Korean Air Force transport crash ===
On 5 February 1982 a Fairchild C-123J carrying 47 of its members, along with six Korean Air Force personnel, were killed in a crash while on approach to Jeju International Airport, Jeju, South Korea.

It was the deadliest peacetime accident the Korean armed forces experienced since the Korean War, with the exception of another Air Force C-123 that crashed into Mt. Choenggye on 1 June 1982, killing 53, including ROK-SWC's 49 commandos and four air force personnel.

=== 2024 South Korean martial law ===
On 3 December 2024, at approximately 10:27 p.m. Korea Standard Time (KST), South Korean president Yoon Suk Yeol declared martial law during an address broadcast live on YTN television.

He accused the opposition Democratic Party of sympathizing with North Korea and conducting "anti-state activities", further labeling them a criminal organization working with North Korean communists to destroy the country.

The order included the prohibition of any political activities, including of the National Assembly, and a suspension of the freedom of the press.

Members of the 707th Group were dispatched by the president to the National Assembly building and attempted to enter the main hall where they were thwarted by protestors. Some personnel were spotted carrying simunitions rounds rather than live ammunition.

Following the National Assembly's vote to repeal the martial law decree, personnel from the 707th had withdrawn.

== Image ==
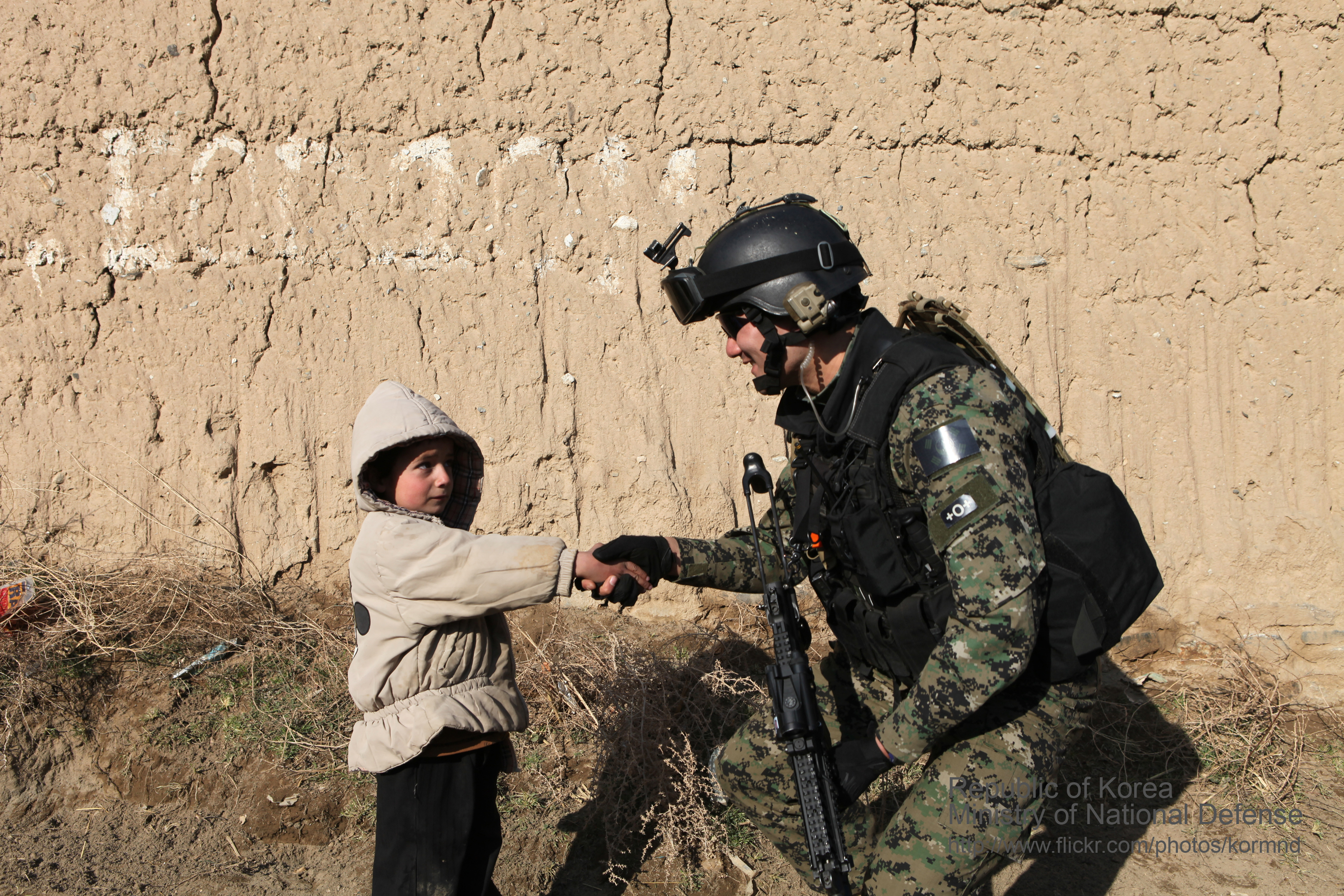
Rep. of Korea 707th The Ashena Unit in Afghanistan

The unit has been called on by the South Korean government to prioritize potential counterterrorism and hostage rescue operations against any possible threats on South Korean soil.

The unit is South Korea's primary black operation, counterterrorism, hostage rescue, and quick reaction force (QRF).

The unit's soldiers – once distinguished by their black berets (before the standardization of the black beret for all active soldiers) – are tasked with conducting against irregular military, constitute the Army's QRF for emergencies, special operations that are extremely high-risk and dangerous, and urban counterterrorism and hostage rescue missions.

The unit's nickname is White Tiger.

== Organisation ==
Prior to reorganization the 707th Battalion had about 200 men and women organized into a:

- Counter-Terrorism Team
- Maritime-Operations Team
- Air-Assault Team
- Sniper Team
- Intelligence Company
- All-female Company

The all-female company could be used as bodyguards or for low-visibility operations, all divided into fourteen-man operating teams, as well as support and demolition teams. The all-female company was deactivated in 2014.

== Training ==
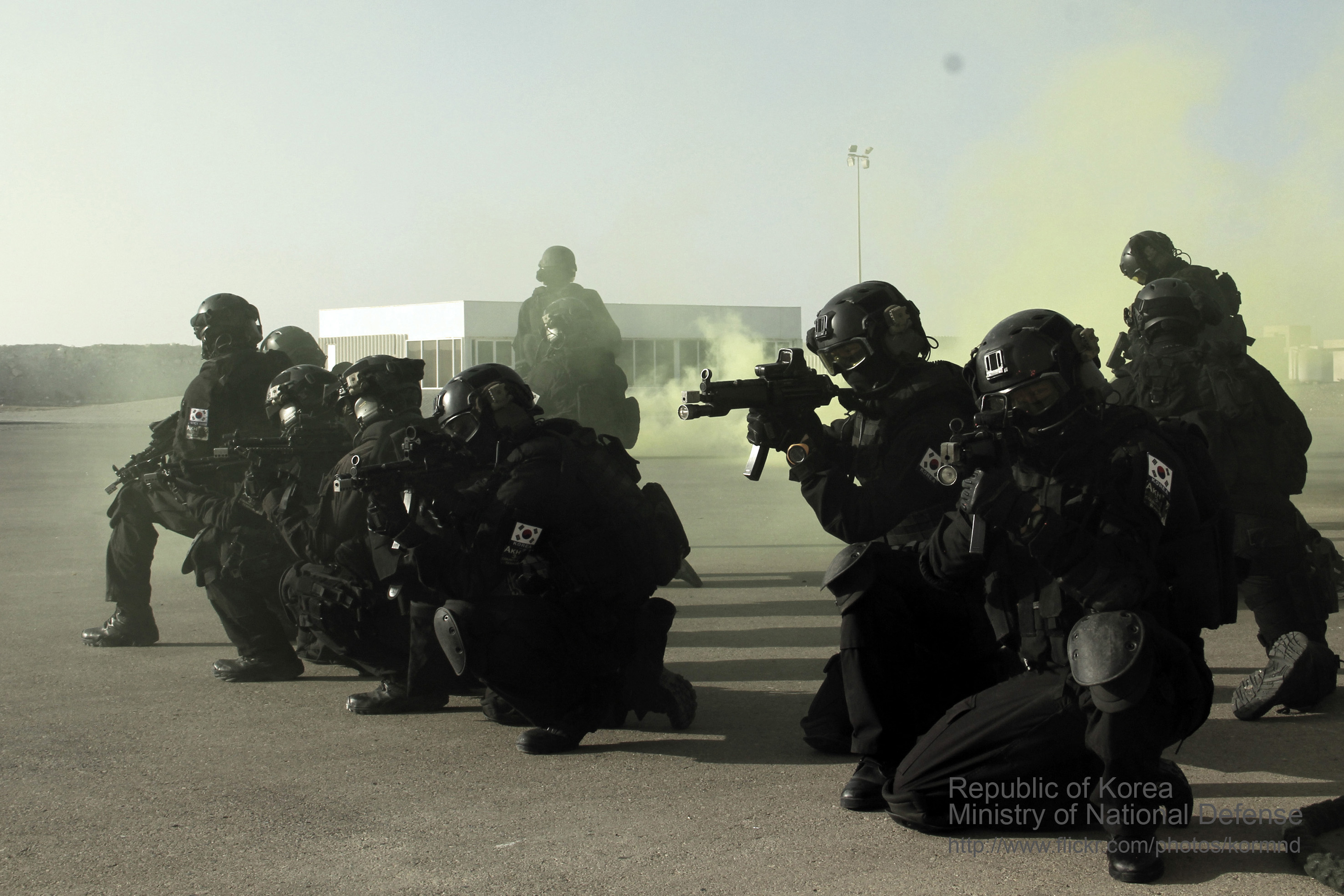
Republic of Korea 707th "Akh Unit" training in UAE

The recruitment process usually involves conscripts from different branches of the Republic of Korea Armed Forces (ROK Armed Forces) who apply and try out to become members of the elite force. Others are handpicked by their superiors across the different branches of the military and try out like their applicant counterparts. The selection process is very rigorous. First applicants will undergo a background check and then undergo a 10-day procedure in which 90% are eliminated.

All members of the 707th Group are SCUBA Diver or UDT/SEAL's and airborne qualified. It is reported that members frequently perform daily calisthenics in the snow and sub-zero temperatures and will swim in freezing lakes without any thermal protection.

707th maintains close ties with similar units from around the globe, including Singapore's STAR group, the Australian SASR and Hong Kong's Special Duties Unit (SDU) although the unit's closest ties are with the US Army's 1st Special Forces Group (Airborne) and Delta Force.

The 707th Group also owns and operates a multi-complex counterterrorism and hostage rescue training site for the ROK-SWC and hosts multi-national counterterrorism and hostage rescue training.

== Equipment ==
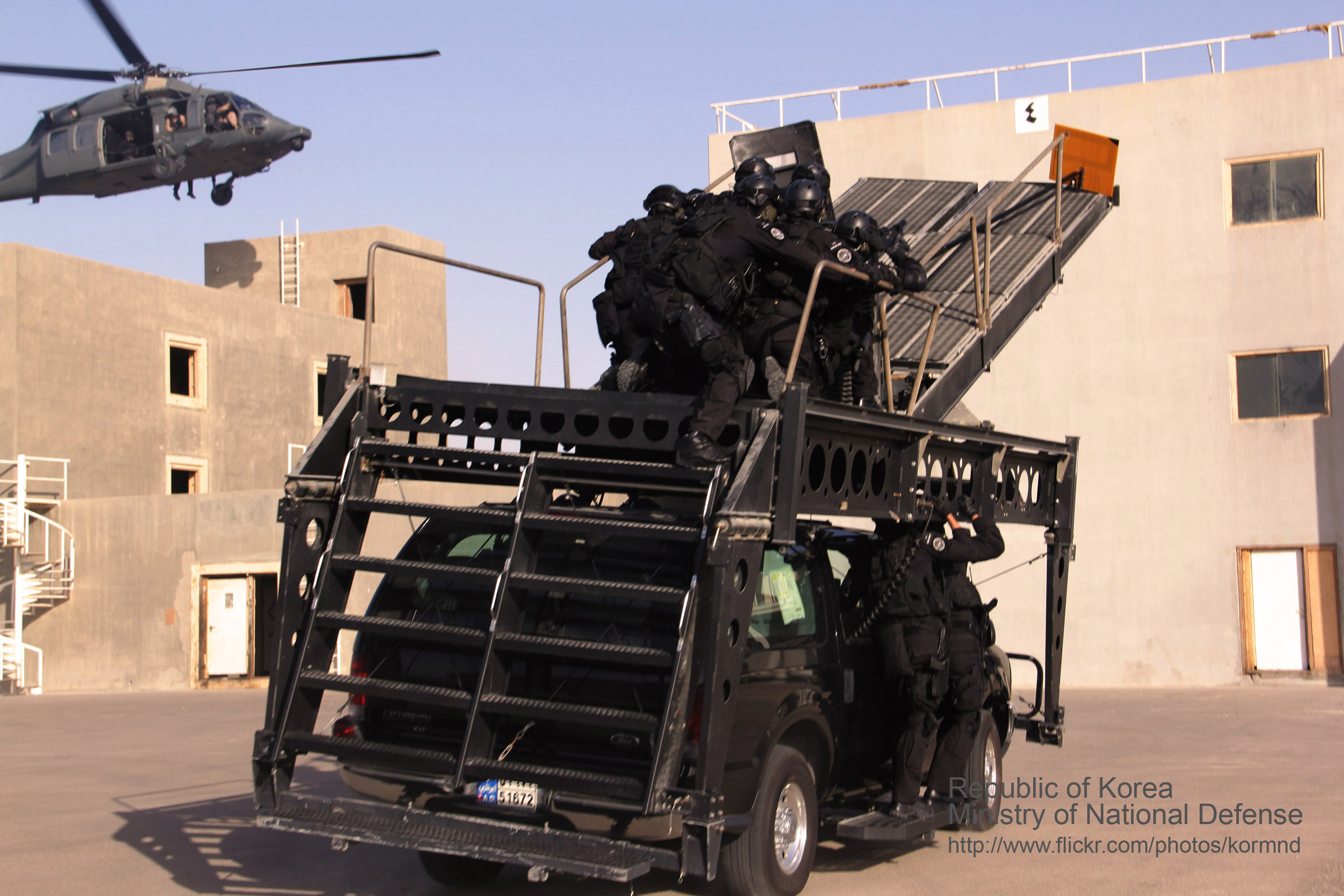
Republic of Korea 707th Akh Unit in UAE

The 707th SMG is known to be using the M2016 Special Warfare Command four-colour desert digital pattern.

=== Small arms ===
707th Special Mission Group snipers in United Arab Emirates.

Model	Origin	Type
Daewoo K5	South Korea	Semi-automatic pistol
Glock 19	Austria	Semi-automatic pistol
Heckler & Koch MP5	Germany	Submachine gun
Brügger & Thomet MP9	Switzerland	Submachine gun
USAS-12	South Korea	Shotgun
Kel-Tec KSG	United States	Shotgun
Daewoo K1	South Korea	Assault rifle
Daewoo K2	South Korea	Assault rifle
FN SCAR-L	Belgium	Assault rifle
M4 carbine	United States	Assault rifle
KAC KS-3	United States	Assault rifle
KAC SR-16	United States	Assault rifle
Daewoo K3	South Korea	Light machine gun
Barrett MRAD	United States	Sniper rifle
Panzerfaust 3	Germany	Rocket launcher

== See also ==
- 13th Special Mission Brigade
