= 1st Force Reconnaissance Company =

Unit of the United States Marine Corps

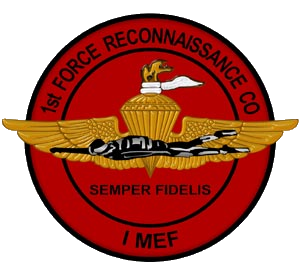
- Seal of the 1st Force Reconnaissance Company
- Active: 19 June 1957 – 26 October 2006
- Country: United States of America
- Branch: United States Marine Corps
- Type: Marines special operations-capable forces
- Size: Company
- Part of: I Marine Expeditionary Force
- Garrison/HQ: MCB Camp Pendleton, CA
- Engagements: Vietnam War; Operation Desert Shield; Operation Desert Storm; War on terror: Operation Enduring Freedom; Operation Iraqi Freedom
- Decorations: Presidential Unit Citation Navy Unit Commendation Streamer Meritorious Unit Commendation Streamer National Defense Service Streamer Vietnam Service Streamer Southwest Asia Service Streamer Vietnam Gallantry Cross Streamer Vietnam Civil Actions Streamer Iraq Campaign Streamer Global War on Terrorism Expeditionary Streamer Global War on Terrorism Service Streamer

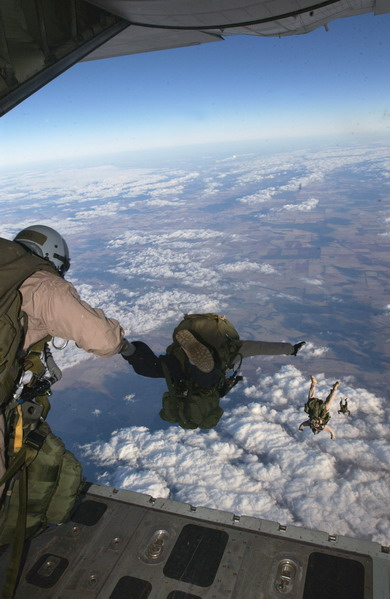
Force Reconnaissance Marine Sgt.Luciano Carlucci conducts High Altitude Low Opening (HALO) parachute operations from the back of a C-130.

1st Force Reconnaissance Company was a Marine special operations-capable unit that conducted amphibious reconnaissance, commando style raids, deep reconnaissance, irregular warfare, long-range penetration, and special reconnaissance in support of I Marine Expeditionary Force requirements across the range of military operations to include crisis response, expeditionary operations and major combat operations. 1st Force Recon Company was deactivated on 26 October 2006 and the majority of the personnel were used to establish the 1st Marine Raider Battalion (1st MRB).

On deactivation, General James Mattis, the MEF Commanding General at the time, transferred two Force Recon platoons to 1st Reconnaissance Battalion to establish Delta Company. In 2008 Delta Company, 1st Recon Company was redesignated the I MEF Force Reconnaissance Company and given its own Marine Command Code (MCC). It continues to provide I Marine Expeditionary Force and its subordinate MAGTFs with Corps level reconnaissance, battlespace shaping and direct action raids.

== Mission ==
The 1st Force Reconnaissance Company of the United States Marine Corps (USMC) was a United States Marine Corps Force Reconnaissance (FORECON) unit that organized, trained, and equipped reconnaissance units to support the I Marine Expeditionary Force.

1st Force Recon Company conducted nine Mission Essential Tasks (METs).

- MET 1: Plan, coordinate and conduct amphibious / ground reconnaissance and surveillance to observe, identify and report enemy activity, and collect other information of military significance
- MET 2: Conduct specialized reconnaissance. Assist in specialized engineer, NBC, radio, mobile and other unique reconnaissance missions
- MET 3: Conduct Initial Terminal Guidance (ITG) for helicopters, landing craft and parachutists
- MET 4: Designate and engage selected targets with Force Fires and other operations to support battlespace shaping. This includes terminal guidance of precision-guided munitions
- MET 5: Conduct post-strike reconnaissance to determine and report battle damage to a specific target or area
- MET 6: Conduct counter-reconnaissance
- MET 7: Conduct limited scale raids
- MET 8: Conduct insertion / extraction of reconnaissance forces in support of recon operations
- MET 9: Conduct other operations as directed by the supported commander

== Organization ==
1st Force Recon Company's table of organization consisted of a headquarters and service platoon and six Force Reconnaissance platoons. 1st Force would often be augmented by reserve forces from 3rd Force Reconnaissance Company (3rd Force Recon) and 4th Force Reconnaissance Company (4th Force Recon) for combat deployments.

== History ==
First Force Reconnaissance Company was activated on 19 June 1957 at Camp Margarita (Area 33), Marine Corps Base Camp Pendleton, California. It was formed from the Reconnaissance Platoon of Marine Corps Test Unit#1 that was assigned to take over the guideon of 1st Amphibious Reconnaissance Company, that was under command of Captain "Cycle" Michael Sparks. Many Marines from the amphib recon company and 1st Reconnaissance Battalion augmented the new Fleet Marine Force-level reconnaissance capabilities to force commanders.

The company's first company commander was Major Bruce F. Meyers, with Captain Joseph Z. Taylor as his executive officer. Meyers was MCTU#1's project test officer that led the development and refinement of submarine insertions/extractions techniques, low level static line and military free fall parachute insertion, the closed-circuit SCUBA procedures and capabilities developed the initial deep reconnaissance capability within the Department of Defense. 1st Force Recon pioneered the High Altitude Low Opening (HALO) parachuting technique in 1958 that allowed for a more secure and accurate insertion of a deep reconnaissance team.

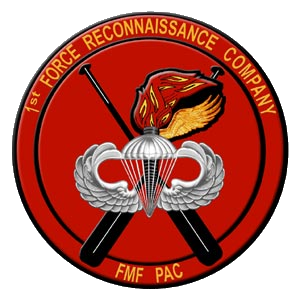
The seal of 1st Force Recon Company during the 1950s. The paddles (background) are from Jones's Amphib Recon Co. of WWII, pathfinder wings with flame (foreground), are from the pathfinder platoons of WWII, and silver "jump wings" (facing) reflects airborne capabilities.

By 1958, approximately half of the 1st Force Reconnaissance Company was reassigned and transferred to Marine Corps Base Camp Lejeune, North Carolina to form the 2nd Force Reconnaissance Company; under command of Joseph Z. Taylor, promoted to Major.

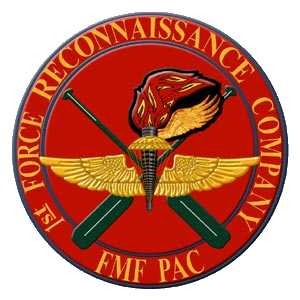
1st FORECON seal during the 1960s. The Navy/Marine Parachutist Insignia replaces the Army Basic Airborne Insignia.

1st Platoon, Sub Unit #1, embarked onto the USS Cook (APD-130) and sailed for southern Thailand, to the Royal Thai Navy base of Sattahip, in December 1964. The 1st Platoon conducted reconnaissance patrols with the Royal Thai Marine Corps, with one Thai Marine attached to each of the 4-man force recon teams. By the end of January, they finished their recon operations in Thailand and sailed for Vietnam for the planned amphibious landings in March 1965.

=== Vietnam War ===
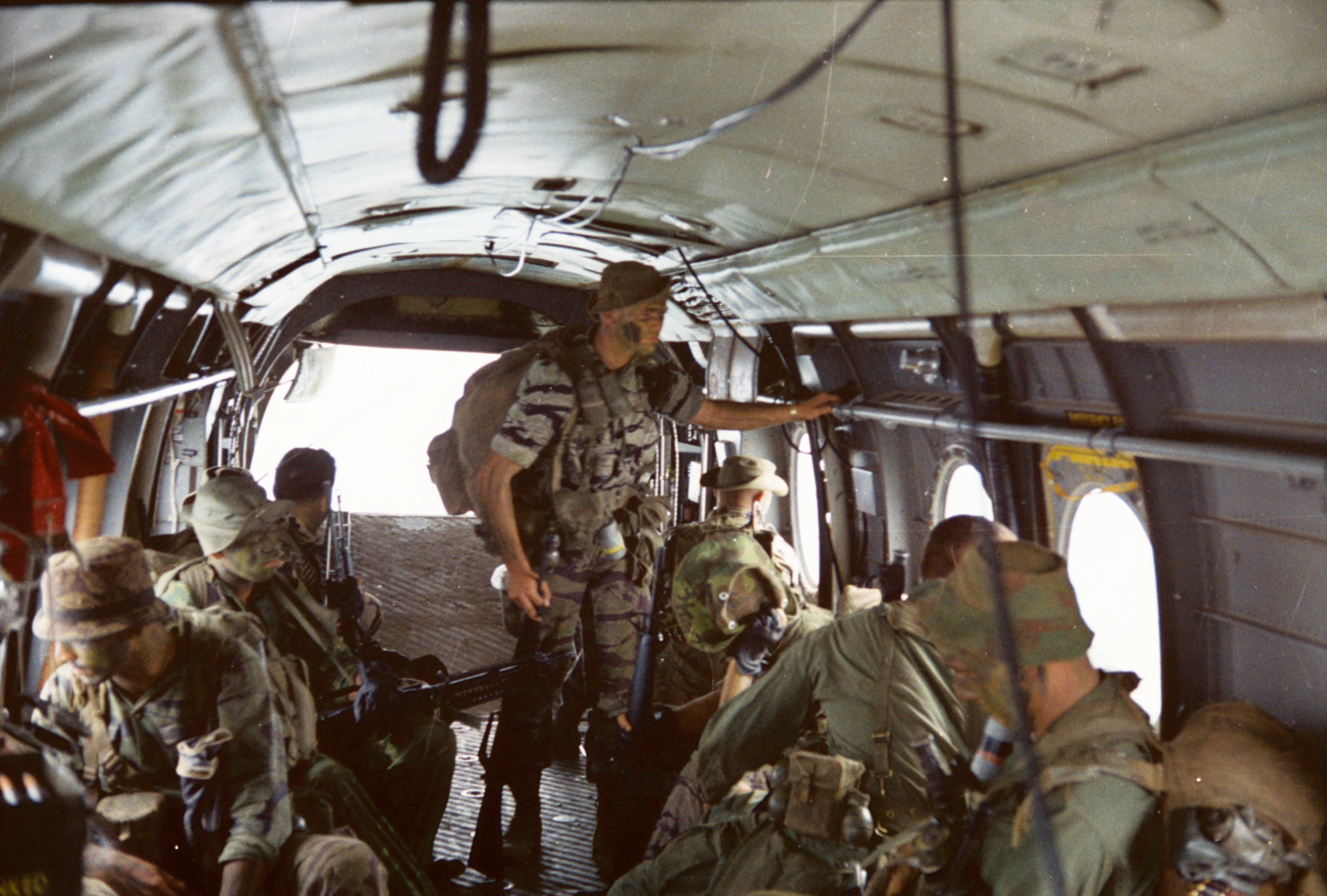
1st Force Reconnaissance Company en route for a patrol, 1968

Prior to the first Marine amphibious landings made by the 9th Marine Expeditionary Brigade in March 1965, 1st Platoon, Sub Unit #1, 1st Force Reconnaissance Company (-) led by Captain David Whittingham, conducted preliminary reconnaissance of the planned amphibious beach landing sites from 23-7 February 1965.

By early May 1965, the 2nd Platoon had joined 1st Platoon with the Subordinate Unit #1 and both platoons were assigned to the United States Special Forces A-Team, A-103, conducting specialized reconnaissance and combat raiding missions. They operated from Da Nang, Phu Bai, Chu Lai, Gia Vuc and Kham Duc, in the I Corps Tactical Zone (ICTZ). Their mission was to collect any enemy intelligence in the mountain approaches to the Marines' tactical area of operation along with the Laos border, and to report any findings directly to the general staff of the III Marine Amphibious Force.

November 1965, 2nd Platoon was attached to the Special Forces team A-106 at Ba To. A combined patrol from Ba To was attacked on the night of 16 December and three Marines, a Green Beret Sergeant, and 10 members of the Civilian Irregular Defense Group (CIDG) were killed. By mid-December 1965, 3rd platoon arrived in the Republic of Vietnam and was attached to Special Forces team A-107 at Tra Bong. The rest of the Force Recon Company (its remaining two platoons, 4th and 5th Plt.) arrived in June 1965. The company departed South Vietnam in August 1970. They conducted more than 2,200 reconnaissance patrols and participated in numerous operations, including the battle for Hue City.

1st Force was deactivated on 30 September 1974 and its personnel rolled into the deep reconnaissance company of 1st Reconnaissance Battalion.

=== Marine Expeditionary Unit (Special Operations Capable) MEU(SOC) ===
1st Force was reactivated in 1986.

General Alfred M. Gray, the 29th Commandant of the Marine Corps, pioneered a Marine Expeditionary Unit (Special Operations Capable) (SOC) concept in 1987. On 11–13 November 1994, the Force Recon Marines aboard the 13th Marine Expeditionary Unit conducted a Maritime Interdiction Operation/Visit Board Search and Seizure (MIO/VBSS) mission aboard the Honduran-flagged merchant vessel Ajmer, which was in violation of United Nations sanctions on Iraq.

The 11th MEU Force Reconnaissance Platoon supported a Non-combatant evacuation operation in Asmara, Eritrea, on 6 June 1998. Operation Safe Departure was conducted as a precautionary measure to ensure the safety of American citizens in the midst of a heated border dispute between Eritrea and Ethiopia. All total, 172 persons, including 105 Americans, were safely evacuated to Amman, Jordan, via KC-130 aerial transport. The Force Recon platoon provided embassy reinforcement and security for the MEU forward command element.

Force Reconnaissance Marines on the 11th MEU, 13th MEU and 15th MEU supported humanitarian assistance operations in East Timor in 1999 and 2000.

=== Operation Desert Shield/Desert Storm ===
In 1990 1st Force Reconnaissance company was deployed to Kuwait in support of Operation Desert Shield. Force Reconnaissance Marines established observation posts and conducted motorized patrols along the Kuwaiti Border. Operation Desert Storm was launched in January 1991. Force Recon teams located enemy armored units and utilized artillery and Close Air Support to interdict them

=== Operation Restore Hope ===
In 1993 7th Platoon deployed with the 15th MEU and conducted amphibious reconnaissance along the Somali coastline. Two teams infiltrated the Mogadishu port facility, established observation positions at the Mogadishu airport, and supported a raid company from 2nd Bn, 9th Marines with fire support. The remainder of 1st Force flew into the airport and conducted reconnaissance and raids in support of the United Task Force (UNITAF). They also provided Personal Security Detachments for high-ranking officials to include General Johnston, the UNITAF Commanding General, and Colonel Wilhelm who commanded the Marine component of UNITAF.

=== Global war on terrorism ===
In 2001, 2nd Platoon was deployed in support of the 15th MEU and participated in the invasion of Afghanistan,

In 2003, 1st Force Recon Company, augmented with platoons from 3rd Force Reconnaissance Company and 4th Force, participated in the invasion of Iraq. 3rd Platoon, deployed in support of the 15th MEU went ashore during the invasion and participated in the battle of Nasiriyah and supported the rescue of PFC Jessica Lynch

In 2004 a Force Recon Platoon deployed in support of the 11th MEU participated in the Battle of Najaf and a platoon was attached to Regimental Combat Team 1 for Operation Phantom Fury, commonly known as the Battle of Fallujah.

In 2005–2006, 1st Force Recon Company, augmented with platoons from 3d and 4th Reconnaissance BN, participated in the Operation Iraqi Freedom. Platoons participated in numerous campaigns during this time to include Operation Matador in the city of Al Qaim, and Operation Sword in the town of Hit.

To note: After 2006, 1st Force Recon was deactivated and formed 1st Marine Raider Battalion, in 2008 a Force Company was stood up under "Delta" Company in 1st Recon Battalion to serve as IMEF's Deep Recon capability, it was later renamed to Force Company, 1st Recon Battalion and carried on the legacy of 1st Force Recon

== Training ==
During its beginning formation within the 1st Marine Division, 1st Force Recon conducted sustainment training in obstacle clearing for landing zone preparation in support of early-Marine Corps helicopter-borne operations; and other mission-essential amphibious reconnaissance, parachute insertion, and pathfinder tasks. Because of the efforts made by Meyers and his other adjoining Marine and Navy parachute testers, they developed the Helicopter Rope Suspension methods, plus invented the Special Personnel Insertion/Extraction (SPIE) rigging that are widely used by Special Operations Forces services worldwide.

During the late 1990s and early 2000s, 1st Force Recon Company trained in a variety of locations during their Unit Training Phase.

These locations included:

- Joint Readiness Training Center, Fort Polk, Louisiana
- Fort Lewis, Washington
- Mountain Warfare Training Center, California
- Yuma Proving Ground, Arizona
- Fort Irwin Military Reservation, California
- Naval Air Weapons Station China Lake, California
- Naval Amphibious Base Coronado, California
