= General Hardy =

General Hardy may refer to:

- Campbell Hardy (1906–1984), Royal Marines general
- Hugh W. Hardy (1924–2003), U.S. Marine Corps Reserves major general
- Jean Hardy (1762–1802), French Royal Army brigadier general
- John Spencer Hardy (1913–2012), U.S. Army lieutenant general
