= Marine Corps Test Unit =

Experimental testing unit of the United States Marine Corps

Marine Corps Test Unit #1
- Active: 1 July 1954 - 19 June 1957
- Country: United States
- Allegiance: Department of the Navy
- Branch: United States Marine Corps

The Marine Corps Test Unit 1, or MCTU #1, was an experimental testing unit of the United States Marine Corps. It was established outside the Fleet Marine Force for the development of specialized tactics, techniques and organizational concepts, and to evaluate its tangible employment in the nuclear age. It reported directly to the commandant of the Marine Corps.

== Mission ==
Mission objectives for Marine Corps Test Unit #1 as directed by Commandant of the Marine Corps:

1. Evolve organizational concepts for the marine landing force under conditions of nuclear warfare,
2. Determine requirements for light-weight weapons and equipment to permit maximum tactical exploitation of nuclear weapons,
3. Develop tactics and techniques responsive to the full employment of nuclear weapons, and
4. Evolve operational concepts, transportation requirements, and techniques to enable fast task force ships and submarines, or a combination of such shipping and airlift, for movement to the objective area and the ship-to-shore movement.

== History ==
The two atomic bombs that were dropped on Japan to end World War II demonstrated the threat of nuclear warfare. In December 1946, Marine Corps instructor Colonel Robert E. Cushman, Jr. wrote an extensive staff report to then-Marine Commandant Alexander Vandegrift about feasible massive amphibious landings over small areas subject to potential tactical nuclear weapons. He envisioned that the Marine Corps could no longer imagine small-scale operations, recommending the planning for greater mobility and dispersion, and focus entirely on operating more inland from the sea:

"The tiny island, the single port, the small area...these will no longer be proper objectives. We must think in terms of 200 miles in width and depth." —Colonel Robert Cushman, April 1955.

It was not until 1951, after the Korean War had commenced, that the Marine Corps began to develop heliborne experience in the battlefield when they used helicopters to rapidly transport companies and battalions into the combat zone. However the Marine Corps didn't have enough helicopters nor the individual helicopter lift capability at that time to employ the tactics needed to implement Colonel Cushman's concept of dispersion.

Marine Commandant Lemuel Shepherd's staff realized the Marine Corps was in need of a test unit outside the operationally committed Fleet Marine Force to develop special tactics, techniques and organizational concepts for the nuclear age; however, it had to remain under operational control of the Commandant of the Marine Corps. On 1 July 1955, Commandant Shepherd approved his staff's recommendation and activated Marine Corps Test Unit #1, near Basilone Road at Camp Horno on MCB Camp Pendleton.

=== Deactivation of MCTU #1 ===
The commandant acted upon that MCTU #1 would case its colors and integrate its research and development, merging their roles into the amphibious reconnaissance companies. Major Bruce F. Meyers relieved Captain Michael Spark as the commanding officer of 1st Amphibious Reconnaissance Company on 18 June 1957. The next day, 1st Amphibious Reconnaissance Company received orders from the Fleet Marine Force, Pacific (FMFPac) and disbanded its colors. 1st Force Reconnaissance Company was activated on 19 June 1957 with Bruce F. Meyers as its first commanding officer. Captain Joseph Z. Taylor was his executive officer. Although the MCTU #1 no longer existed, Major Meyers continued to pursue more unique methods in insertion capabilities.

== Organization ==
General Shepherd appointed Colonel Edward N. Rydalch as the Test Unit's commanding officer and Lieutenant Colonel Regan Fuller as the executive officer over a command of 104 marine officers, 1,412 enlisted, 7 navy doctors and 51 hospital corpsmen, and one chaplain.

The MCTU #1 initially began as a regimental-sized unit with a headquarters and service company; one infantry battalion consisting of four companies; one 75mm anti-tank platoon; one 4.2-inch mortar platoon; one 75mm pack howitzer artillery battery. The Test Unit's Operations (S-3) officer was Major Dewey "Bob" Bohn.

The Infantry Battalion was commanded by Lieutenant Colonel Stanley Nelson, with Major Willmar "Bill" Bledsoe as the executive officer. It was assigned to test the feasibility of conducting major 'helicopter' landing assaults projected from the sea. Similarly, amphib recon Marines tested the usage of submarines for coastal projection during World War II.

A Plans and Development (P&D) Section was formed in April 1955 to evaluate the trials and tests of the infantry battalion and other subordinated unit's experiments with MCTU #1. Major Bruce F. Meyers reported for duty and was initially assigned as the assistant operations officer of the infantry battalion. He was subsequently redesignated as the Helicopter Assault Airborne Techniques Officer.

By September 1955, the reconnaissance platoon, commanded by Captain Joseph Z. Taylor, was added to resolve the amphibious reconnaissance role in the Fleet Marine Force. It was also tasked to bring the past force-level preliminary amphib recon methods of World War II towards a modern approach that included parachute insertions and helicopter capabilities.

Marine Corps Test Unit #1 Commanding Officer — Colonel Edward N. Rydalch Executive Officer — Lieutenant Colonel Regan Fuller
Headquarters Company	Infantry Battalion^{Commanding Officer — Lt. Colonel Stanley Nelson; Executive Officer — Major Willmar "Bill" Bledsoe}
(S-1) Administration* (S-2) Intelligence (S-3) Operations — Major Dewey "Bob" Bohn (S-4) Logistics* (S-6) Communications (S-8) Finances* (S-9) Civil Affairs*; Plans & Development Section† — Major Bruce F. Meyers	A (Alpha) Company; B (Bravo) Company; C (Charlie) Company; D (Delta) Company; 75-mm Anti-Tank Platoon; 4.2-inch Mortar Platoon; 75-mm Pack Howitzer Artillery Battery; Reconnaissance Platoon—Captain Joseph Z. Taylor
^{* Assigned to the general staff of MCB Camp Pendleton. † Acted as a combined Planning (S-5) and Training (S-7) section. ∞ A medium helicopter squadron, augmented with three observation helicopters; and six attack aircraft — 1st Marine Aircraft Wing.}

An air element of a medium helicopter squadron was augmented with three observation helicopters and an additional six Grumman F9F-2 Panthers to support MCTU #1 during its research and development. A Marine Air Wing element was attached along with administrative and logistic support at the request from nearby MCAS El Toro.

Around late May in 1957, MCTU #1 finalized all their reports summarizing the last two years of the heliborne assault exercises, nuclear weapons testing, and the recon platoon's parachute reconnaissance and pathfinding experiments into a sixty-page after-action report archived as "Test Project 6H". By early June, the recon platoon received the last remaining jumpers from MCTU #1 and were adjoined by several more recon marines from the 1st Marine Division Recon Company that became jump qualified.

On 18 June 1957, the reconnaissance platoon from the test unit was disbanded and reported to 1st Marine Division, FMF, then to its headquarters battalion to assume command of the 1st Amphibious Reconnaissance Company. Major Bruce F. Meyers relieved Captain Michael Spark, who was later killed in the Vietnam War and awarded the Navy Cross. The next day on 19 June 1957, the newly assembled 1st Amphibious Reconnaissance Company was dissolved, casing its colors for the establishment of 1st Force Reconnaissance Company, Fleet Marine Force.

=== Plans and Development Section ===
In April 1955, Colonel Edward Rydalch created a separate Plans and Development Section in an effort to author staff studies for various tests by the subordinated units of marine corps Test Unit #1 and make evaluations and reports to the commandant on their progress. Colonel Rydalch assumed additional duties as the titular head of the P&D Section. He assigned Lieutenant Colonels Regan Fuller and Chuck Bailey as the executive officers and supervisors of the daily tests and evaluations that were to be generated by P&D. The section operated much like a subsidiary to Operations (G-3) but with nominal independence within MCTU #1. It was established in the newly constructed 'Butler Building', dubbed as the "War Room". The building was completely surrounded by barbed wire and had an armed guard on post.

A significant figure that revolutionized the modern scope of the marine corps reconnaissance doctrine was (then-) Captain Bruce F. Meyers. Prior to his assignment with the test unit, Meyers was a combat swimming instructor and also the officer-in-charge (OIC) of the Amphibious Reconnaissance School, NAB Coronado for 35 months. During his tenure as OIC, he began to develop innovative ideas of deeper parachute insertion methods from aircraft projected from aircraft carriers. He figured if the aircraft could slow down enough to land on carriers, then they could slow sufficiently for parachutists to exit and deploy their parachutes.

Meyers took this 'parachute entry' concept to Brigader General Lewis "Chesty" Puller, who requested that Meyers write a letter to the commandant, outlining the plans and thoughts on deeper reconnaissance and pathfinding. With Chesty Puller's endorsement, the commandant directed Meyers to attend parachutists' schools. Meyers spent two weeks on Temporary Additional Duty orders to the Naval Parachute Loft on NAS North Island, then was sent to Fort Benning for one year with the United States Army service schools to attend the US Army Infantry School, and the parachute and jumpmaster courses. Upon completion, he was directed to report to the Marine Corps Test Unit #1 to test his ideas of deep parachute entry in use with reconnaissance. Major Bruce F. Meyers reported to MCTU #1 in early April 1955 and was immediately assigned as the assistant operations officer.

By May 1955, Major Meyers was reassigned to the P&D as the "Reconnaissance/Pathfinder Project Officer", until his title was initially changed to "Helicopter Assault Airborne Techniques Officer" to reflect the test unit's heliborne capabilities within the infantry battalion; his duties remained the same despite the title change. After setting up the Standing Operating Procedure for Test Unit 1, Major Meyers and the Test Unit's executive officer, Lieutenant Colonel Fuller, prepared a detailed recommendation to their commanding officer, Colonel Rydalch, and to the commandant for approval of forming and training a reconnaissance platoon for MCTU #1.

=== Reconnaissance Platoon ===
The Reconnaissance Platoon, Marine Corps Test Unit #1, of some twenty marines was established in September 1955 after the approval of the commandant, by the recommendation of the P&D Section and the commanding officer of MCTU #1. The Reconnaissance Platoon was the precursor to the Force Reconnaissance companies and was created to be employed exclusively in the training, testing, and exercises designed to validate reconnaissance theories and techniques of an all-helicopter assault. These were applied to the higher levels in the echelon in addition to use at the battalion or regimental landing team-level. This recon platoon subsequently became the pivotal beginning of the existing deep recon assets that are maintained at Fleet Marine Force-level.

The test unit's executive officer, Lieutenant Colonel Fuller, personally requested Captain Joseph Z. Taylor, a reconnaissance company commander with 3rd Reconnaissance Battalion, to be the reconnaissance platoon commander. Taylor had served under Lieutenant Colonel Fuller in 1950 when Fuller was the commanding officer of 2nd Amphibious Reconnaissance Battalion on MCB Camp Lejeune.

Taylor recently returned from reconnaissance exercise (RECONEX) 551 at Iwo Jima aboard the USS Perch (ASPP-313) with 3rd Recon Battalion. This allowed Taylor to bring fresh submarine and rubber raft experiences to the test unit's experimental reconnaissance platoon.

Lieutenant Colonel Regan Fuller tasked both Bruce Meyers and Joseph Taylor to seek innovative ways in finding practical aircraft, equipment, and methods to enhance and develop the emerging deep reconnaissance capability in the marine corps.

== Subordinate training ==
=== Infantry battalion ===
Early 1955, the four-company infantry battalion trained in wooden mockups of Sikorsky helicopters in repetitive troop exercises, making the battalion fully capable of being helicopter transportable by following spring.

==== Exercise Desert Rock VI ====
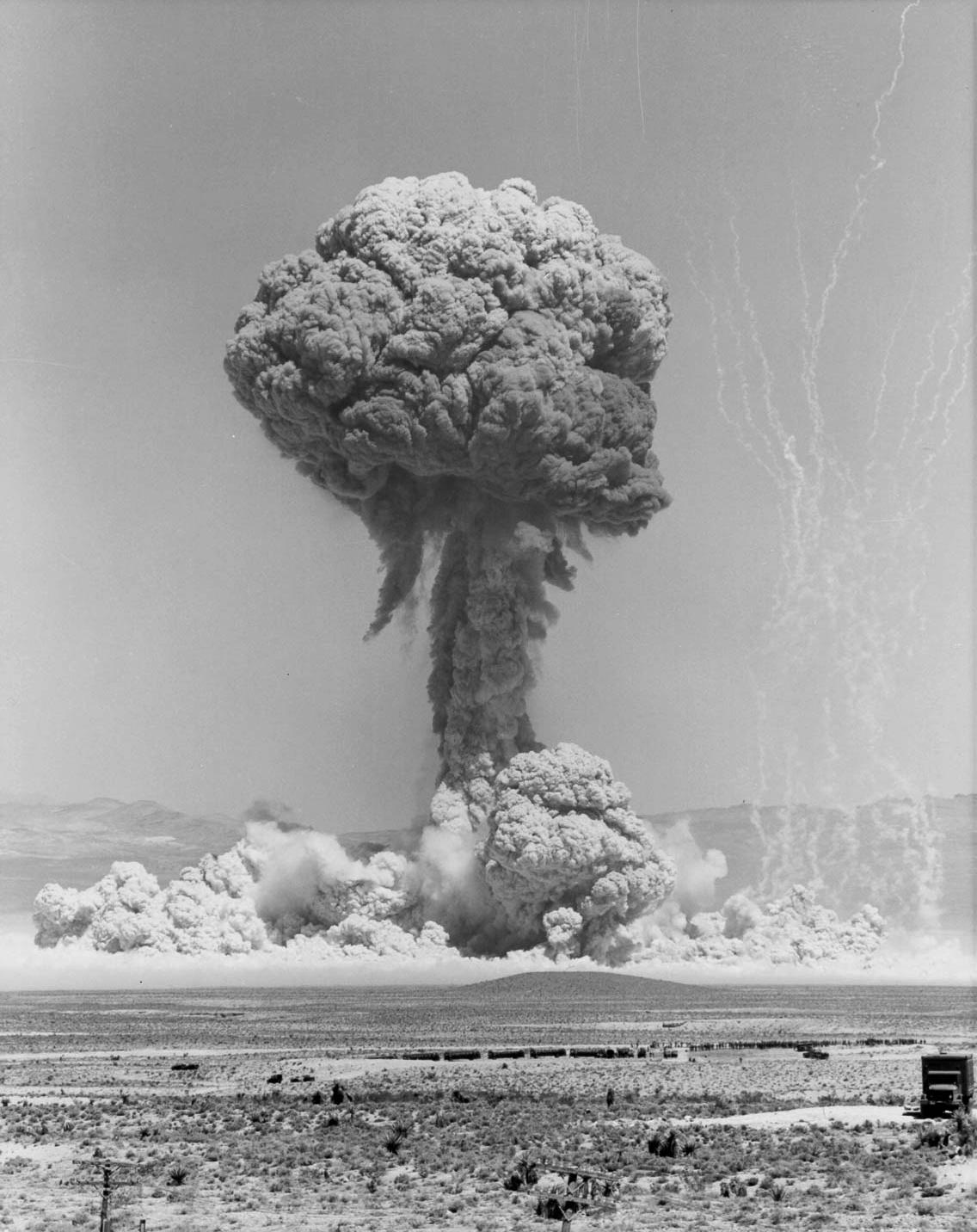
Nevada Test Site, Operation TEAPOT

On March 22, 1955, the infantry battalion of MCTU #1 was temporary assigned to the 3rd Marine Corps Provisional Atomic Exercise Brigade, or 3rd MCPAEB, to participate in Exercise Desert Rock VI - codenamed Operation TEAPOT. Operation TEAPOT was a series of tactical nuclear weapons tests with active nuclear warheads conducted by the United States Atomic Energy Commission at the Nevada Test Site. The battalion and its detached aviation elements were involved in Shot 'Bee'.

A nuclear weapon was detonated simultaneously as the infantry battalion maneuvered within 3,500 yd (3,200 m) away from ground zero, acting as an amphibious battalion landing force in the vicinity of a nuclear fallout. Close air support was used, targeting the helicopter Landing Zones ninety seconds before the Marines were set down. While the Marines were advancing, the mushroom cloud was still forming above. The battalion simulated their attacks through a buildup of mock trenches and facilities made to resemble a city.

Exercise Desert Rock VI also concluded tests in the effects of the atomic blast on their equipment and Marines on the ground. Equipment and mannequins were placed in different locations of varying distances from ground zero, all displayed in different degrees of protection. After the detonation and fallout cleared, the marines from the infantry battalion, Marine Corps Test Unit #1, were taken and shown the effects of their equipment and mannequins. The after-action report with the photographs that were taken before and after photographs revealed that their tanks had turrets blown off, amphibious tracked vehicles were turned upside-down, and the mannequins in the open were vaporized. However, the distance from ground zero and the additional level of protection proved noteworthy. The tactical exercise that they had successfully demonstrated gave the Marine Corps a survivability estimate and an appreciation for the atomic power of nuclear weapons.

=== Reconnaissance Platoon ===
The Reconnaissance Platoon of Marine Corps Test Unit #1 conducted ground reconnaissance training to hone their skills, as well as basic and advanced amphibious recon training that was set up through the liaison at the Amphibious Reconnaissance School, Troop Training Unit, Pacific (TTUPac) on NAB Coronado. Another training liaison was established with the Commander of the Naval Air Force, US Pacific Fleet, or COMNAVAIRPAC, at NAS North Island in enrolling the recon platoon into the Navy's SERE School and the USAF's Escape and Evasion course; originally designed for pilots that faced the possibility of being shot over enemy territory. It became a reasonable conclusion that reconnaissance marines would be operating deep behind enemy lines and would require such training. After MCTU #1 had been dissolved, the 1st Force Reconnaissance Company continued to experiment in newer innovative means in projecting and recovering their recon Marine operators from behind enemy lines safely and efficiently.

In 1956 Free Fall parachuting was illegal in the United States Armed Forces. Reserve captain Jacques-Andre Istel, USMCR, who had led a civilian team to the 1956 World parachuting Championships in Moscow, wrote to HQMC recommending the use of free fall parachuting for reconnaissance. The letter ultimately led to the "HALO" (high altitude low opening) project which was a success thanks to Istel's personal involvement on active duty and the use of blank-gore lines-first deployment parachutes from his company, Parachutes Incorporated (NYS). In 1957, PI was also entrusted with training the US Army in free-fall parachuting, providing them with an instructor, Daryl Henry, also an architect. Istel later commanded VTU 1-1, the only Reserve Recon unit. (References below)

The MCTU #1 participated in major exercises with the first assembled Marine Air-Ground Task Force during Air-Ground Landing Exercise 57-I (AGLEX 57-I) in December 1957, and Operation SKI JUMP in January 1957. During Operation SKI JUMP, the reconnaissance platoon were to provide pre-D-Day reconnaissance, and later pathfinding, for the upcoming helicopter assault waves. Thirty days prior to the scheduled landing, or D-Day minus thirty (D-30), the reconnaissance platoon was divided into two separate reconnaissance teams and parachuted into two separated drop zones to reconnoiter the planned helicopter landing zones. A simulated nuclear weapon was to be detonated between the two helicopter landing zones at 0810 the same day, prior to the planned pathfinder drop and following after helicopter landings of a battalion of marines. The mock atomic bomb was made of 55 US gal (210 L) barrels of napalm buried into the ground. The pathfinder teams were scheduled to parachute to their respective drop zones, DZ Yellow and DZ Red, at 0815.

Three parachutist Marines were killed during SKI JUMP on January 17 at Case Springs, a high plateau and wooded area on Camp Pendleton. Severe winds suddenly appeared while the parachutists were in their descent. Corporal Ben Simpson and PFC Matthew J. O'Neill Jr., were dragged over 1,000 ft (300 m). They were found dead by Major Bruce Meyers, their skulls were crushed and helmets gone due to the drag. Lieutenant Kenneth Ball, the jumpmaster in the stick, was knocked unconscious and wasn't able to attempt the quick-release; he later died at the Camp Pendleton hospital from multiple intrusions. The marines in the reconnaissance platoon were using the standard military-issued T-10 parachutes. One of the findings were that the T-10 safety "quick-release" on the front of the harness made it quite impossible to detach in case of emergencies, even after frequent practice by the parachutists. Dirt and small rocks fouled the quick-releases while the harnesses were dragged at 15 miles per hour (24 km/h) over the ground, making them ineffective.

The Board of Investigations concluded that improvements to their parachutists and equipment were to be provided. Chief Warrant Officer Lewis "Lew" T. Vinson suggested that the Capewell canopy release be installed on all the Marines' parachutes, static-line or free-fall, to permit the jumper to get out of the harness if caught in a drag. Later, the Army Parachute Board came to the same conclusion at Fort Benning and Fort Bragg. Six army parachutists had been recently killed at Fort Bragg in the same manner as the unfortunate marines at Case Springs. Because of these deaths, it led to the recommendation and requirement of adopting the Capewell Release by all the services.

==== Parachutist and jumpmaster training ====
Not until April 1956, the Marines in the Recon Platoon were able to gain the necessary quotas to send the recon platoon leader, Captain Joe Taylor, and his twenty enlisted Marines to the United States Army Airborne School at Fort Benning, Georgia. However, Bruce Meyers was the only Marine within MCTU #1 that had parachutist experience and qualifications and recognized the perils of not being prepared for airborne school. Through their recommendation, Meyers and Taylor were able to construct its own 'pre-jump school' to prepare Marines for the course; this prevented the loss of Marines that became unqualified due to the Test Unit's training quota.

Captain Taylor managed to get the services of Sergeant Robert Zweiner, a parachute rigger from an Air Delivery Platoon at the nearby airstrip on Camp Pendleton. Sgt. Zweiner led a grueling course, instructing the Marines in Parachute Landing Falls (PLFs), body positioning and positive exits from aircraft. All of them were able to pass the pull-up physicals and complete the long runs; by the time the Test Unit's recon Marines were sent to the actual school, they were well-prepared and everyone passed the course, each earning their silver wings and returning to MCTU #1. Robert Zweiner was quickly reassigned and transferred to MCTU #1 to head the test unit's newly formed Parachute Loft, becoming the founder of 1st Force Reconnaissance Company's Paraloft.

Although all the Marines assigned to the Test Unit's recon platoon were now low-level static line qualified, Major Bruce Meyers was still, however, the only Marine in MCTU #1 with free-fall experience. Meyers's next objective were to turn the majority of Marines in the recon platoon to become also free-fall qualified.

Once again, Meyers set up training with a training liaison to send a bulk of the platoon on temporary additional duty on 1 July 1956 to the Naval Parachute Unit (NPU) at Naval Auxiliary Air Station in El Centro, California. Under the instructions of a very highly qualified Navy jumpmaster, Chief Warrant Officer Lewis "Lew" T. Vinsen, introduced the art of free-falling to the recon platoon. Due to the free exchange and cross-training cooperation in these efforts, on one occasion, Air Force Captain Joseph Kittinger from Wright Patterson Test Center jumped several times with the Marines of Recon Platoon, Marine Corps Test Unit #1. Capt. Kittinger later made, and still holds, the world-record for the highest free-fall parachute jump from the gondola of a high-altitude balloon.

The recon Marines would jump on average two- to three-times daily testing various types of parachutes, which soon became apparent by both MCTU #1 and NPU that the Marine should also try to become 'navy test parachutists' due to the increased sophisticated and variant types of free-fall jumps the recon Marines were experimenting. By the next year, Major Bruce Meyers, Captain Joe Taylor, Sergeant Robert Zweiner and several others of the 'more-qualified' Marines parachutists within the test unit's recon platoon subsequently became qualified as "Naval Test Parachutists" after completing the twenty-two jump syllabus.

In the realization of the increasingly sophisticated parachute jumps, jumpmasters were assigned to oversee the overall conduct of the jumps performed. The most important aspect of this training was the jumpmaster's judgment, determining the exit points that would best get his Marines into the LZ, and to judge the winds appropriately both on the ground and aloft. Eventually, all the staff non-commissioned officers were jumpmaster qualified after five jumps as Assistant Jumpmasters.

==== Off-carrier tests ====
One of the highest priorities considered for reconnaissance and pathfinder parachute insertions in the Marine Corps were to expand its capability in jumping from carrier-based aircraft. The jump logs for MCTU #1 and the first twenty months of 1st Force Recon has shown various types of parachutes and different carrier-based aircraft that had been experimented in finding alternative methods parachute entry, such as the Fairchild C-119 Flying Boxcars, Douglas R4D-6 Skytrains, Lockheed P2V Neptunes, L-2 Beavers, AJ-2 Savages, F3D-2 Skyknights, TF-1 Trader and A-3 Skywarriors.

Beginning in May 1956, Major Bruce, Captain Taylor and Sergeant Zweiner headed to the Air Transport Squadron Five (VR-5) at NAS North Island and spent countless hours examining the Grumman TF-1 Trader. Originally, the TF-1 Trader was a carrier onboard delivery aircraft, whose primary mission was the consignment of personnel, mail, and critical parts for the naval carrier vessel itself. It was capable of launching off every size of naval carrier, even its smallest, in the United States Fleet. Detachments of VR-5 were dispersed worldwide everywhere US Naval carriers were sent. This proved the feasibility of the TF-1, assuring of it being potentially accessible almost virtually anywhere in the world.

The only difficulty was that the TF-1 Trader never in the past had foreseen its use in parachute deployment, modifications were made to the bombing bay chutes by mounting anchor-line cables to allow parachutists to hook up their static lines. After a thorough review of aerial and still photography, plus extra scrutiny of the aircraft, they attached dummies with the appropriate weight and gear and tested its use. Major Meyers, CWO Lew Vinson and two other NPU parachute engineers made the first live jumps from the TF-1 carrier aircraft on 9–13 July 1956. They began to test later jumps with the TF-1 by wearing additional combat gear, including weapons, packs and the AN/GRC9 radio.

The "first" off-carrier parachute jump test in naval aviation history was on July 26, 1956, when the Test Unit arranged a TF-1 Trader from VR-5 to depart the USS Bennington (CVA-20) 70 miles at sea and dropped four Marines on a desert drop zone in the vicinity of El centro, some 100 miles inland. The Marines from Recon Platoon, MCTU #1, Major Bruce Meyers, 1stLt. Donald E. Koelper (later killed in combat as a captain, receiving the first Navy Cross of the Marine Corps in the Vietnam War), and PFCs Kenneth Bell and Matthew O'Neill (later killed during the Test Unit's parachute training) made the jump. In August 1956, the recon platoon made its first parachute jump from a jet aircraft, the F3D-2 Skyknight.

The American broadcast journalist Walter Cronkite later filmed 2nd Force Recon in their off-carrier parachute jumps from the A3D Skywarrior in "The New Recon Marines" in 1962.

==== Pathfinder training ====
The development of Marine Corps pathfinding in the Test Unit were first being tested in April 1953. The Marine Corps Test Unit #1's concept of pathfinder methods were; to develop techniques for undetected movement from their drop zones (DZ) to the preselected helicopter landing sites and approach-lane control points, coordination timing for pathfinder drops with atomic or other fire support, and methods for last-minute emplacement of visual and electronic terminal guidance aids.

After the Grumman TF-1 Trader was tested operationally for parachute entry in reconnaissance, the Recon Platoon assembled and trained as pathfinder teams; designed to parachute in, set up, and operate one helicopter landing zone consisting of one or more landing points for individual helicopters. Many of the pathfinder methods were developed by the recon-pathfinder Marines themselves. Major Bruce Meyers set up a direct liaison with their helicopter counterparts at MCAS El Toro and MCAS Santa Ana of the 1st Marine Aircraft Wing.

The helicopter crew and the Test Unit's recon platoon cross-trained in a series of day-and-night trial and error tests. They used the emergency SE-11 signal lights and the Justrite, a three-colored high-intensity beam used to guide pilots onto aircraft carriers during night landings. The Justrite had a simple visual sight that was intended for aiming either the lower edge, bottom red lens, indicating a too-low descent; the middle green lens, indicating a perfect elevation and/or descend; and the upper, top amber lens, indicating that the pilot must increase his rate of descend so as not to overshoot the landing zone (LZ). If the pilot saw "red", he were to decrease his rate of descend and immediately climb up until he was back into the "green".

In September 1956, Recon Platoon of MCTU #1 tested their pathfinding capabilities, the "first" operational use of Marine pathfinders in the Marine Corps. In preparation for the Air-Ground Landing Exercises (AGLEX) 57-E that was to be scheduled for early 1957, a pathfinder team parachuted into MCB Camp Pendleton from a TF-1 Trader, established visual and radio aids and guided four helicopters to a designated LZ. It was proved satisfactory in utilizing the procedures and techniques worked out between the pathfinder teams, Marine Aircraft Group 36 (MAG-36) and MARS-37.

On 28 March 1957, the pathfinders jumped in Helicopter Landing Exercise IV (HELILEX IV) with 3rd Battalion 1st Marines.

==== Extraction and recovery methods ====
The MCTU #1 reported to the Commandant of the Marine Corps that they had proven and tested its capability in full operational methods of insertion for deeper pre-assault and post-assault parachute reconnaissance. It would supplement the already existing methods of amphibious reconnaissance of areas close proximity of the littoral landing beaches. The Marines now had the capability of carrier-launching recon teams, day or night, for effecting penetration of enemy radar air defenses and postdrop retirement of the carrier aircraft.

Important among the reconnaissance and pathfinder elements were to improve the existing methods of post-reconnaissance evasion and recovery of the reconnaissance and pathfinder teams. It was already logical that if the recon teams were on, or near, the littoral areas of an amphibious operation, they were close enough to be extracted by submarine or seaplane. However, since Marines were going to be penetrating and inserting deeper into enemy territory, it was time to develop practical means in overland evasion techniques to reach the availed recovery that is coherently from the sea.

In September 1956, the first training exercises in evasive methods were in the rugged Laguna Mountains, east of San Diego in a region between MCB Pendleton and El Centro in California. The recon Marines chose the Cuyamaca Reservoir, a large, grassy, dried-up reservoir suitable for a night parachute drop zone and subsequent helicopter landing zone.

The recon platoon was broken down into four-man recon teams and planned three successive jumps from the TF-1 Trader and two night jumps from the F3-D Skyknight jet. A P5M Marlin seaplane was arranged to rendezvous with the teams off the western shore of the Salton Sea at dawn for recovery once they conducted their preliminary pre-D-Day reconnaissance. The recon Marines would traverse by foot 60 mi (97 km) due east through the Colorado Desert and Chocolate Mountains to be picked up the seaplane. The recon platoon even made arrangements with the civilian agencies to create maximum realism to their evasion exercises. They notified the Federal Bureau of Investigation, the United States Border Patrol, and the United States Immigration and Naturalization Service, as well as all police agencies working in the area. The local authorities would simulate enemy patrols; the realism added extreme scrutiny to the trials and tests of the recon platoon's training.

These long-range, cross-country evasion exercises were copied and exacted from the Royal Marines; it depicted the similar roles in the British film The Cockleshell Heroes.
