= United States Marine Corps Force Reconnaissance =

USMC deep reconnaissance unit

Force Reconnaissance
- Force Recon insignia
- Active: June 19, 1957 – present
- Country: United States of America
- Branch: United States Marine Corps
- Type: Deep reconnaissance unit
- Role: Direct support of Marine Air-Ground Task Force for: Deep reconnaissance; Amphibious and underwater reconnaissance; Advanced Force Operations; Surveillance; Hydrographic survey and other specialized technical reconnaissance; Pathfinding and LZ/DZ preparation; Direct Action; Post-strike reconnaissance; Counterreconnaissance; Specialized limited scale raids including Visit, Board, Search, and Seizure (VBSS) and Maritime Interdiction Operations (MIO)
- Size: Four companies: three active duty and one reserve
- Part of: Fleet Marine Force (FMF): Atlantic (FMFLant); Pacific (FMFPac)
- Nicknames: Force Recon, FORECON
- Patron: Dion Williams; James L. Jones Sr. Bruce F. Meyers; Joseph Z. Taylor
- Mottos: Celer, Silens, Mortalis ("Swift, Silent, Deadly")
- Engagements: Vietnam War; Operation Urgent Fury; Operation Just Cause; Operation Desert Storm; Operation Restore Hope; Operation Enduring Freedom; Operation Iraqi Freedom; Operation Inherent Resolve

Force Reconnaissance (FORECON) are United States Marine Corps reconnaissance units (Note: FORECON companies conduct deep reconnaissance.) that provide deep ground and amphibious reconnaissance, surveillance, and limited-scale raids. They primarily support the Marine Expeditionary Force (MEF) and other Marine Air-Ground Task Forces (MAGTF). Although FORECON companies are conventional forces they share many of the same tactics, techniques, procedures and equipment of special operations forces. (Note: FORECON companies share many of the same tactics, techniques and procedures (TTP), and terms and equipment with special operations forces.) Though commonly misunderstood to refer to reconnaissance-in-force, the name "Force Recon" actually refers to the unit's relationship with the Marine Expeditionary Force or Marine Air-Ground Task Force. Since the mid-1980s, a force recon detachment has formed part of a specialized sub-unit of Marine Expeditionary Units known as the Maritime Special Purpose Force (MSPF) or Maritime Raid Force (MRF).

== Mission ==
The mission of Force Reconnaissance is to conduct amphibious reconnaissance, deep ground reconnaissance, surveillance, battle-space shaping, and limited scale raids in support of the Marine Expeditionary Force (MEF), other Marine air-ground task forces, or a joint force. Operational missions are categorized into two types: "green" operations, which focus on reconnaissance, and "black" operations, which involve direct action. Force Recon remains a conventional asset under the direct control of the Marine Corps, distinct from the United States Special Operations Command (USSOCOM), and are not special operations forces. The Force Recon platoons operate farther inland than their Division Recon counterparts, penetrating deeper into enemy territory from their assigned littoral (coastal) region within a force commander's tactical area of responsibility (TAOR), often at ranges beyond the support of friendly artillery and/or naval gunfire support (NGFS).

=== Reconnaissance vs. Direct Action ===
Two mission sets emerged during the Vietnam War: Key Hole (deep reconnaissance) and Sting Ray (direct action). Key Hole patrols were designed purely around reconnaissance and surveillance. Usually lightly equipped and armed with defensive weapons, they employ evasive techniques to break away from the enemy should the need arise; avoiding enemy contact is paramount. Conversely, Sting Ray operations had goals more closely aligned with offensive strikes. In a Sting Ray operation, the FORECON operators were heavily armed and use artillery and/or naval gunfire support, if available. However, what began as a "keyhole" patrol could become a "stingray" patrol with little warning. The versatility of FORECON is demonstrated through switching between deep reconnaissance patrols to direct action engagements in certain situations.

=== Green operations ===
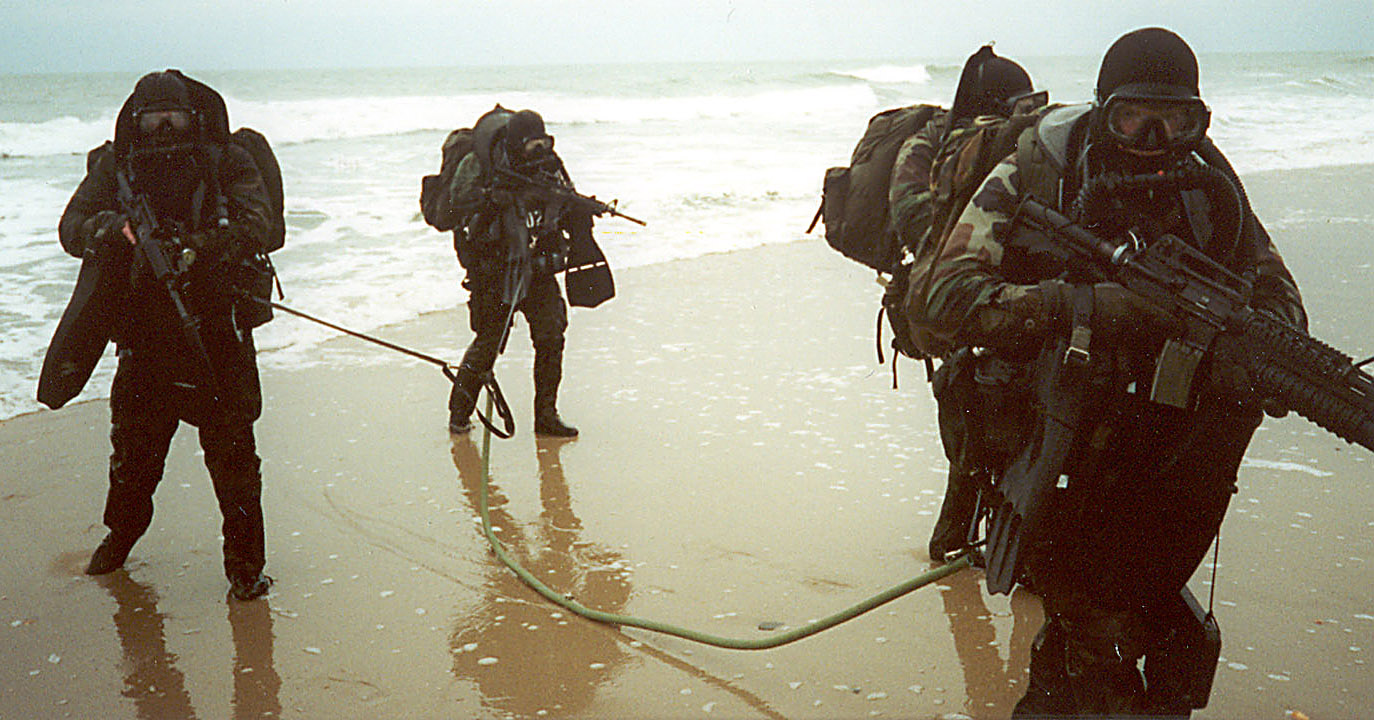
A four-man fireteam of Marines simulates infiltrating a beachhead to gain information about the enemy and the adjacent beaches to help forecast a ship-to-shore landing operation — an example of green operations

Green operations are the principal mission of Force Recon to collect any pertinent intelligence of military importance, observe, identify, and report adversaries to MAGTF commanders. Like Division Recon (also known as the Marine Recon Battalions), they employ a mixed element of amphibious reconnaissance and ground reconnaissance. This practice fundamentally covers a wide spectrum of reconnaissance but primarily the FORECON operators conduct deep reconnaissance. Their reconnaissance missions include preliminary (or "pre–D-Day") and post-assault reconnaissance. Some examples are:

- Battle damage assessment (BDA) missions – Witnessing and reporting damage to targets, either from heavy support fire measures (artillery and naval gunfire), air strikes, or thermonuclear weapons.
- Remote sensors operations – Placing remote sensors and beacons is vital for marking friendly/hostile boundaries and areas for helicopter assault and infantry transport.
- Initial terminal guidance (ITG)–setting up/preparing landing zones (LZ) and drop zones (DZ) for forward operating sites, Marine fixed or rotary-wing aircraft, or waterborne locations (landing force, ship-to-shore).

=== Black operations ===
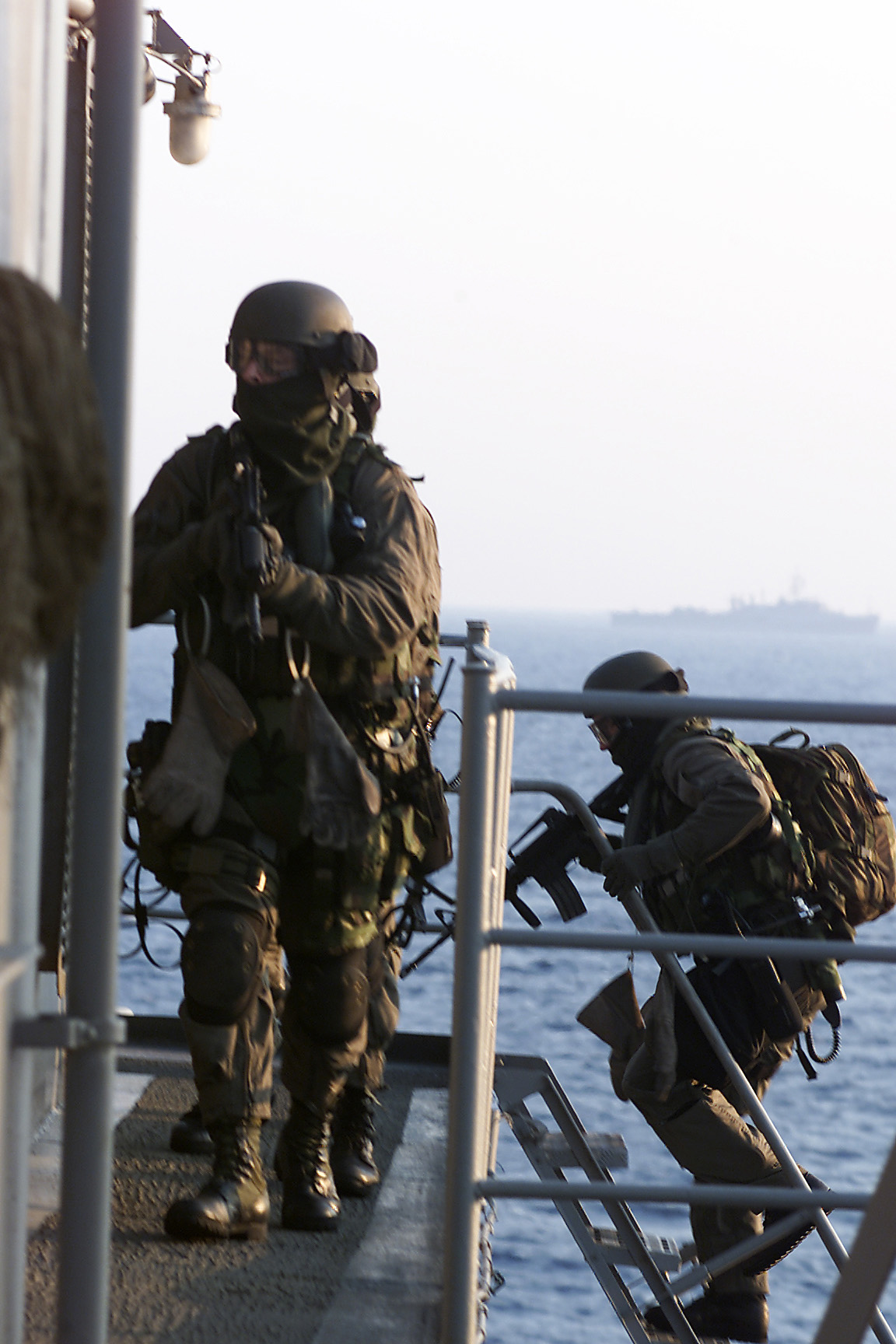
A team of operators from a direct action platoon (DAP) conducts 'Visit, Board, Search, and Seizure' (VBSS) training during a Maritime Interdiction Operation (MIO) exercise — an example of black operations

Black operations are the missions that require direct action (DA). They are the opposite of green operations missions, where the Force Recon operators "look for trouble."

Examples are the seizures and occupation of gas/oil platforms (GOPLAT) and the visit, board, search, and seizure (VBSS) of ships during Maritime Interdiction Operations (MIO).

They provide personal security detail (PSD) for critically important personnel within the MAGTF. They were formerly capable of performing In-Extremis Hostage Rescue (IHR), but this is no longer a Force Recon mission task.

== Organization ==
In the past, early Force Reconnaissance companies initially were designed to function under the echelon of the Navy/Marine force commanders (e.g. under the direct operational control of the Commander, Amphibious Task Force (CATF) and Landing Force (CLF), and Fleet Marine Force) during amphibious landing operations or expeditionary engagements—to provide timely intelligence without exhausting their reconnaissance assets from the Marine Division without hampering their valuable support to its infantry regiments.

Due to these changes, FORECON has been detached and reported to multiple commanders of Marine divisions, the Command Elements (CE) of the Marine Air-Ground Task Forces, and the immediate commander of the Marine Expeditionary Force (MEF). They were re-organized or reserved for "special reconnaissance" assignments that would otherwise help shape the outcome of his battlefield. These companies, for a few times in their existence, had either folded into the Marine Division, its Regiment's Recon Battalions, or dissolved entirely to only resurface during conflicts, or when other similar reasons had arisen.

The creation of Marine Special Operations Command (MARSOC) on February 24, 2006, marked the United States Marine Corps' first commitment to the United States Special Operations Command (USSOCOM). On August 11 2006, 2nd FORECON was deactivated with the majority of its personnel transferred to MARSOC to establish 2nd Marine Special Operations Battalion (2nd MSOB) with two platoons reassigned to 2nd Reconnaissance Battalion to establish D Company. Two months later in October, 1st FORECON met the same fate, with the majority of its personnel transferred to establish 1st Marine Special Operations Battalion (1st MSOB) with two platoons reassigned to 1st Reconnaissance Battalion to establish D Company. The D companies in the Division Reconnaissance Battalions were designed to maintain and preserve a "deep reconnaissance" asset for the Marine Expeditionary Force (MEF). In 2007, 2nd Reconnaissance Battalion deactivated its D Company.

In 2008, the Commandant of the Marine Corps, directed that Force Reconnaissance Companies be re-established from Division Reconnaissance Battalion personnel to support the three MEFs: I MEF, II MEF and III MEF. The companies were placed under the operational command of the MEF and under the administrative control of the Division Reconnaissance Battalion. In December 2008, 2nd Reconnaissance Battalion activated its Force Reconnaissance Company.

The three Force Reconnaissance companies of I, II, and III MEF are currently the only active components of force-level reconnaissance; whereas the 3rd FORECON is the Selected Reserve force reconnaissance asset available to augment and reinforce the Fleet Marine Force. In the Marine Corps Reserve, the FORECON is a separate unit reporting directly to the 4th Marine Division Commanding General (4th MarDiv CG), unless mobilized and ordered detached to a Gaining Force Commander. Additionally, as a separate unit, the FORECON are not part of 4th Reconnaissance Battalion, which is itself a separate unit reporting directly to the 4th MarDiv CG.

A force recon detachment had, since the mid-1980s, formed part of the Maritime Special Purpose Force (MSPF), a specialized sub-unit of a Marine expeditionary unit (special operations capable) (MEU(SOC)). From 2013 to 2023, MEU(SOC) were defunct, including the integral MSPF. A MEU had a Maritime Raid Force (MRF), the successor of the MSPF built around a FORECON detachment. In July 2023, II Marine Expeditionary Force certified the first MEU(SOC) in over decade, including an MSPF.

In February 2021, 4th Force Reconnaissance Company was deactivated and consolidated into the 4th Reconnaissance Battalion.

=== Table of organization (T/O) ===
Each Force Reconnaissance company is basically the same; they all contain a command element and Force Recon platoons. Each company is commanded by a company commander and his executive officer.

Commanding officer (CO); Executive officer (XO)
Command Element: (S-1) Administration; (S-2) Intelligence; (S-3) Operations; (S-4) Logistics; (S-6) Communications	Headquarters and Service (H&S) Platoon; 1st Platoon (DAP); 2nd Platoon (DAP); 3rd Platoon (DRP); 4th Platoon (DRP); 5th Platoon (SSP)

=== Active ===
Emblem	Name	Parent division/Battalion	Location
	Force Reconnaissance Company	1st Reconnaissance Battalion, 1st Marine Division	MCB Camp Pendleton, CA
	Force Reconnaissance Company	2nd Reconnaissance Battalion, 2nd Marine Division	MCB Camp Lejeune, NC
	Force Reconnaissance Company	3rd Reconnaissance Battalion, 3rd Marine Division	Camp Schwab, Okinawa
	3rd Force Reconnaissance Company	4th Marine Division (Reserve) Marine Forces Reserve	Mobile, Alabama

=== Deactivated ===
Logo	Name	Parent command	Location
	1st Force Reconnaissance Company	I Marine Expeditionary Force	MCB Camp Pendleton, CA
	2nd Force Reconnaissance Company	II Marine Expeditionary Force	MCB Camp Lejeune, NC
	4th Force Reconnaissance Company	Marine Forces Reserve	Alameda, CA
	5th Force Reconnaissance Company	III Marine Expeditionary Force	MCB Camp Butler, Okinawa

== History ==
The historical roots of "Force Recon" companies can be traced back to the antecedent Amphibious Reconnaissance Battalion, whose numerous pre-D–Day reconnoitering of enemy beaches during the Pacific campaigns of World War II proved the vitality of the Fleet Marine Force's amphibious reconnaissance doctrine. This unique unit reported directly to the landing force commander, providing him important intelligence at his disposal.

Formed initially as a company-size element from the Observer Group, under the command of Major James L. Jones, they were among the first—along with the early Navy Combat Demolition Units (the predecessor to the Underwater Demolition Teams [i.e., the Navy SEALs])—to embark from submarines; most of their missions complemented those of the NCDU and the UDT. The "amphibious reconnaissance" doctrine clearly outlined that the recon Marines' duties consisted of scouting the littoral areas, or beachhead, and inland; to test the soil permeability for a possible beach landing; to clear any obstacles that may hinder an amphibious assault; and to observe any sign of enemy activity. The Navy UDT were tasked with providing the same, but from off the coastline to the littoral, or adjacent beach areas.

Jones and his Recon Marines scouted the Japanese-fortified beaches and observed the terrain, materials, or other entities, primarily reporting to the force commander any vital intelligence of mission-oriented importance. Although Jones's Marines were all skilled surface swimmers, they usually inserted by boats—mostly due to the multiple radios (primary and contingent) they carried, as relaying communication to the landing force commander was paramount, and as a timely means of sending in a platoon-sized element with heavy firepower (mortars, machine guns, etc.) at their disposal since they were greatly outnumbered and isolated from other major Marine forces, which were still embarked on the destroyer-transport ships.

By the end of World War II, the Amphibious Recon Battalion disbanded its command; its Marines either filled the ranks of other infantry platoons, or integrated into the Scout (Tank) companies, and the newly formed division reconnaissance companies. This force-level reconnaissance element was not re-established until the early 1950s, when the Amphibious Reconnaissance Battalions were assembled for preliminary operations in Korea. Their efforts proved that gaining the knowledge of the enemy before a major operation was crucial to safeguarding the men, and provided better operational planning.

The Korean War introduced the new concept of using rotary-wing aircraft to the Marine Corps in combat employment for logistics and rapid troop transport. Also, the atomic age was emerging and caused concern among the military leaders. The Commandant of the Marine Corps, General Lemuel Shepherd created a test unit, the Marine Corps Test Unit 1 (MCTU #1), to research and experiment on new and improved combat tactics and on methods to prepare the Marine Corps to operate strategically, in concert with or against, the use of nuclear weapons.

Many of the conceptual ideas for Force Recon were pioneered by Major Bruce F. Meyers, the test unit's "Reconnaissance/Pathfinder Project Officer" from MCTU #1's Plans and Development (P&D) Section. His position can be seen as an unillustrated subsidiary to an "operations" (G-6) and "training" (G-7) officer. Major Meyers tested various innovative techniques for the "Recon Platoon" and evaluated their results for use in parachuting and pathfinding missions, in addition to using its heliborne and aircraft wing assets to add 'deeper' reconnaissance penetration capabilities. This new-found capability gave reconnaissance Marines the advantage of operating further behind enemy lines.

MCTU#1's Reconnaissance Platoon, commanded by Captain Joseph Taylor, founded and adopted the more modern "force reconnaissance" doctrine, methods which were instrumented by Major Meyers. They were developing and performing innovative clandestine insertion methods before the Navy SEALs, and the Army's "Green Berets", such as the submarine locking -in and -out methods, and underwater "blow-and-go" ascents.

The USMC concluded that parachute reconnaissance and pathfinding capabilities would exist at force level, the Fleet Marine Force (the highest command echelon of the United States Marine Corps). At first, the concept was to be formed into a "Force Recon Battalion"—this battalion would have as many "force recon" companies as there were division-wing MAGTFs in the Marine operating forces. Recognizing the limited budget during the fiscal year of 1957, it was instead recommended that it be formed at company-sized elements for the West and East Coast. In July 1957, MCTU #1 was amalgamated into the existing 1st Amphibious Reconnaissance Battalion. The next day, the battalion cased its colors and re-designated it as 1st Force Reconnaissance Company. Although the test unit was no longer operating, Meyers continued to research and test more innovative methods.

Major Meyers and his top swimmers and senior officers of the company would test and train in submarine lock-in and lock-out methods and ascending techniques. After being cross-trained by the Navy's Master Divers, they learned the operation of the early rebreather systems and advanced open water swimming. Meyers understood that his recon Marines would be operating 50 to 150 miles away from their littoral or operating area, or from any naval support. In order to get his Marines out of a "hot" area, extraction techniques needed to be developed. Bruce Meyer's 1st FORECON, along with 1st Recon Company and 1st Marine Aircraft Wing were aware of the McGuire rig and STABO systems that were used by the United States Army's Special Forces, though they agreed that they had defects and disadvantages. Instead, the Marine Corps created a system that was a more simplified rig that had greater capacity, the Special Personnel Insertion and Extraction (SPIE) rig.

The CIA's Special Activities Division (SAD), and more specifically its Special Operations Group (SOG), recruit operators from Marine Force Recon. In addition, joint Force Recon and CIA operations go back to the Military Assistance Command, Vietnam – Studies and Observations Group (MACV-SOG) during the Vietnam War and still exist.

=== Weapons Planning Group (Code 121) ===
The Reconnaissance/Surveillance Section of the Weapons Planning Group, Landing Force Development Center at Quantico introduced Force Recon to new technological methods of achieving their objective. Many of its tests and evaluations resembled the tests of MCTU #1. However, MCTU #1 were testing methods of inserting reconnaissance teams "deep" into the battlefield. The Weapons Planning Group (Code 121) provided the equipment that would become instrumental to recon Marines. Beacons for helicopter guidance, laser designators for the guidance of ordnance, laser rangefinders, and many more were tested.

During the Vietnam War, one of the reconnaissance officers of Code 121, then-Major Alex Lee, brought most of his testing experience to 3rd Force Reconnaissance Company when he was assigned as the commanding officer from 1969 to 1970. He formed Force Recon's missions that are still distinct today: remote sensor operations. The Surveillance and Reconnaissance Center (SRC), predecessor to the Surveillance, Reconnaissance, and Intelligence Group (SRIG), was formed within the III Marine Amphibious Force (III MAF). The obsolete pathfinding operations were taken over by the newer beacons and homing devices.

== Operations ==
=== Vietnam War, 1965–1974 ===
3rd Force Reconnaissance Company was activated, trained, fought, and deactivated during the Vietnam War. Activated in September 1965 as one of the first group of add-on units to meet demands of operations in Vietnam, the company formed at Camp Lejeune, N.C. and satellite on Second Force Reconnaissance Company that was under strength due to the demands for trained Force Recon Marines assigned to First Force in country. Facilities, cadre and equipment for training were provided by Second Force.

Volunteers were solicited from throughout the Marine Corps, and the first four months were devoted to bringing the company up to strength in personnel. Beginning in January 1966, all operational personnel departed Camp Lejeune to train in the Caribbean and Panama. Returning to North Carolina in March, final preparations were carried out to meet the projected deployment date in May 1966. The expected deployment of the entire company did not occur, but a two-platoon detachment embarked on the USS Boxer, transited through the Suez Canal, and arrived in country in time to be introduced to combat in Operation Hastings as part of the Special Landing Force in early July 1966.

The company (-) dropped to a not combat ready readiness status. Headquarters Marine Corps transferred several Officers and numerous Staff Non Commissioned Officers immediately after the detachment departed. In mid-June the company (-) was alerted to deploy immediately. Due to the reduced personnel readiness status, HQMC changed the deployment plan and ordered that a platoon be assigned to deploy with First Battalion, 26th Marines that had been activated at Camp Pendleton. The remainder of the company was ordered to move to Camp Pendleton to refit.

At the conclusion of Hastings the detachment was attached to Third Reconnaissance Battalion that had just arrived in Phu Bai from Da Nang, having been replaced by the First Reconnaissance Battalion that had just begun arriving with the First Marine Division. Shortly, they were joined by the platoon that had come in country with 1/26.

They patrolled in Thua Thien Province until early January, 1967, when a task organized Special Purpose group carried out a prisoner rescue attempt. The remainder were sent to Khe Sanh where they developed the intelligence of a large enemy buildup, that was the prelude to The Hill Fights that occurred in April 1967.

Reunited, what was left of the three platoons, returned to Phu Bai to await the arrival of the company (-). Having been brought up to strength and operational readiness, the company was reunited on April 27, 1967, just in time for the North Vietnamese Army (NVA) offensive to seize Quảng Trị Province. The logistics element arrive at the "Ramp" at Đông Hà just in time for the opening salvos of the NVA artillery attacks that would continue daily until late autumn.

The operational element experienced a mortar attack in Phu Bai at the same time resulting in several shrapnel wounds, only one of which, required evacuation. The new arrivals were integrated with combat veterans and the entire eighteen teams conducted a zone reconnaissance in the Cobi Than Tan Valley east of Huế City before displacing to Đông Hà.

Upon arrival at Dong Ha in early May the Commanding Officer assumed command of Third Recon Battalion (Forward), which had reconnaissance responsibility for all of Quang Tri Province except the Khe Sanh TAOR (Tactical Area of Operations). The company patrolled the area north of Highway nine to the DMZ, while the Battalion Company was targeted south of Highway Nine to the Thua Thien border. Occasional circumstances caused deviation from that concept, but, for the most part, those deviations were rare. Third Force continued that operational commitment until the Third Division left country in November 1969.

Third Force was placed under command of The Third Marine Expeditionary Force and operated in general support of IIId MAF until deactivated in mid-1970.

=== Recent ===
On September 9, 2010, the Force Reconnaissance platoon assigned to the 15th Marine Expeditionary Unit (special operations capable) (MEU(SOC)) on the USS Dubuque (LPD-8) conducting the USMC's first opposed Visit, Board, Search, and Seizure (VBSS) recapturing the MV Magellan Star from Somali pirates in the Gulf of Aden.

In 2010, a Force Reconnaissance team from the 24th MEU won the 2010 2nd Annual Warrior Competition against tactical units from all over the world.

== Mission training plan ==
Training within the company is outlined by the mission training plan (MTP). It is used in conjunction with the training and exercises that are conducted by the Marine Expeditionary Units for their "Special Operations Capable" certification. It follows a systematic approach to training, and the emphasis is to "train as they expect to fight".

"The best form of WELFARE for our Marines and sailors is first class training; this saves unnecessary casualties". —MTP quote by S-3 of FORECON companies.

The mission training plan has five phases, and is based on a two-year platoon cycle. Training is ongoing and continuous, and functions as if it were a loop. Before FORECON operators are "Special Operations Capable" they follow the company's MTP, which underlines the training protocol of the Pre-deployment Training Program (PTP).

1. Phase 1: Individual training
2. Phase 2: Unit training
3. Phase 3: MEU (SOC) training
4. Phase 4: MEU (SOC) deployment
5. Phase 5: MEU (SOC) post deployment

=== Phase 1 ===
The Marine candidates who had passed the initial yet vigorous indoctrination exam must undergo and complete a series of courses required for the designated MOS 0326 [formerly 8654], "Reconnaissance Marine, Parachutist/Combatant Diver Qualified," known as the 'accession pipeline.'

Their courses to its various schools are intertwined with the Pre-deployment Training Program (PTP), a training protocol of the Fleet Marine Force–its task forces–that are conducted yearly in a perpetual, continuous cycle. The reconnaissance Marines within FORECON community are unique in that it is the volition of the individual Marine to remain another two-year detachment to the Force Reconnaissance Company. Those that had chosen to remain in the company will proceed to the advanced course of instructions, and again during the next FMF rotational training cycle, and forth. This is due in respects to their status of having already completed and qualified in the appropriate course required for MOS 0321; which otherwise, the initial training, e.g. the accession pipeline, are reserved for the candidates.

The first phase in FORECON's Mission Training Plan takes place within the MEU's Initial Training Phase.

==== Accession pipeline ====
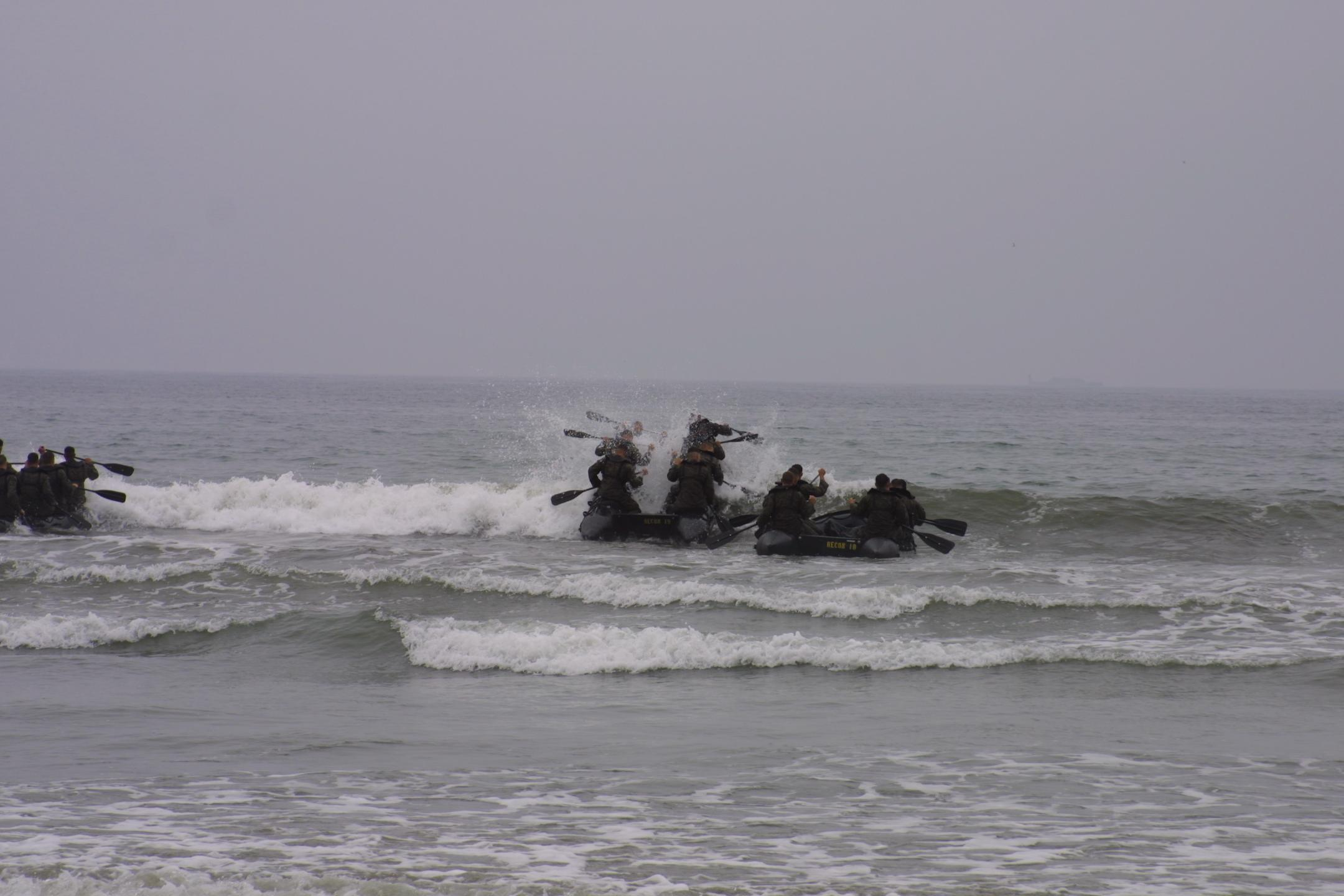
A platoon of Force Recon team operators paddle their Combat Rubber Reconnaissance Craft (CRRC) against the surf out to sea, a skill that they learned since their days in the Basic Recon Course.

- Infantry Rifleman Course – Infantry Training Battalion, US Marine Corps Schools of Infantry (East or West)
- Basic Reconnaissance Course (BRC) – United States Marine Corps School of Infantry (West)
- Survival, Evasion, Resistance and Escape (SERE) [Level "C"]/Navy Remote Training Sites; NAS North Island, Warner Springs, California.
- United States Marine Corps Combatant Diver Course – Navy Diving Salvage and Training Center, Naval Support Activity Panama City, Florida
- Basic Airborne Course – United States Army Airborne School, Fort Benning, Georgia
- Multi Mission Parachute Course – CPS Complete Parachute Systems, Coolidge, Arizona
- High Risk Personnel (HRP) Course – MCB Quantico, Virginia
- Special Operations Training Group (SOTG) – I MEF, Camp Pendleton; II MEF, Camp Lejeune; III MEF, Camp S.D. Butler

==== Special schools ====
During the "Individual Training Phase", the candidates are undergoing the accession pipeline to become qualified MOS 0321 (Reconnaissance Marine). After further training, the already-billeted Force Recon operators (who had already completed the required courses in the accession pipeline [BRC, parachutist and diving, and SERE/HRP courses]) attain MOS 0326 (Reconnaissance Marine, parachute and combatant diver qualified) and may continue to remain with FORECON after the three-year rotation cycle. They may be selected for additional advanced cross-service training from other schools provided by the Special Operations Forces (SOF) units. Although these specialized schools are not necessarily required, they are highly encouraged.

Many Marine Corps 'training liaisons' represent the Marines at many cross-services schools, to ensure training slots and openings are met and filled by the Marines that requested, or were recommended, for advanced training. Some of these courses may not be able to facilitate the Marine students; the instructors of these schools resort to complement the Marines' requested syllabus by designing similar subsidiary courses. This argument becomes clear on whether Marines may, or may not, actually attend the Basic Underwater Demolition/SEAL training (BUD/S). Nonetheless, in the past, selected operators within Force Recon had attended the courses of instructions provided by BUD/S Instructors and their completion is documented in their military Service Record Book (SRB) or Officer Qualification Record (OQR).

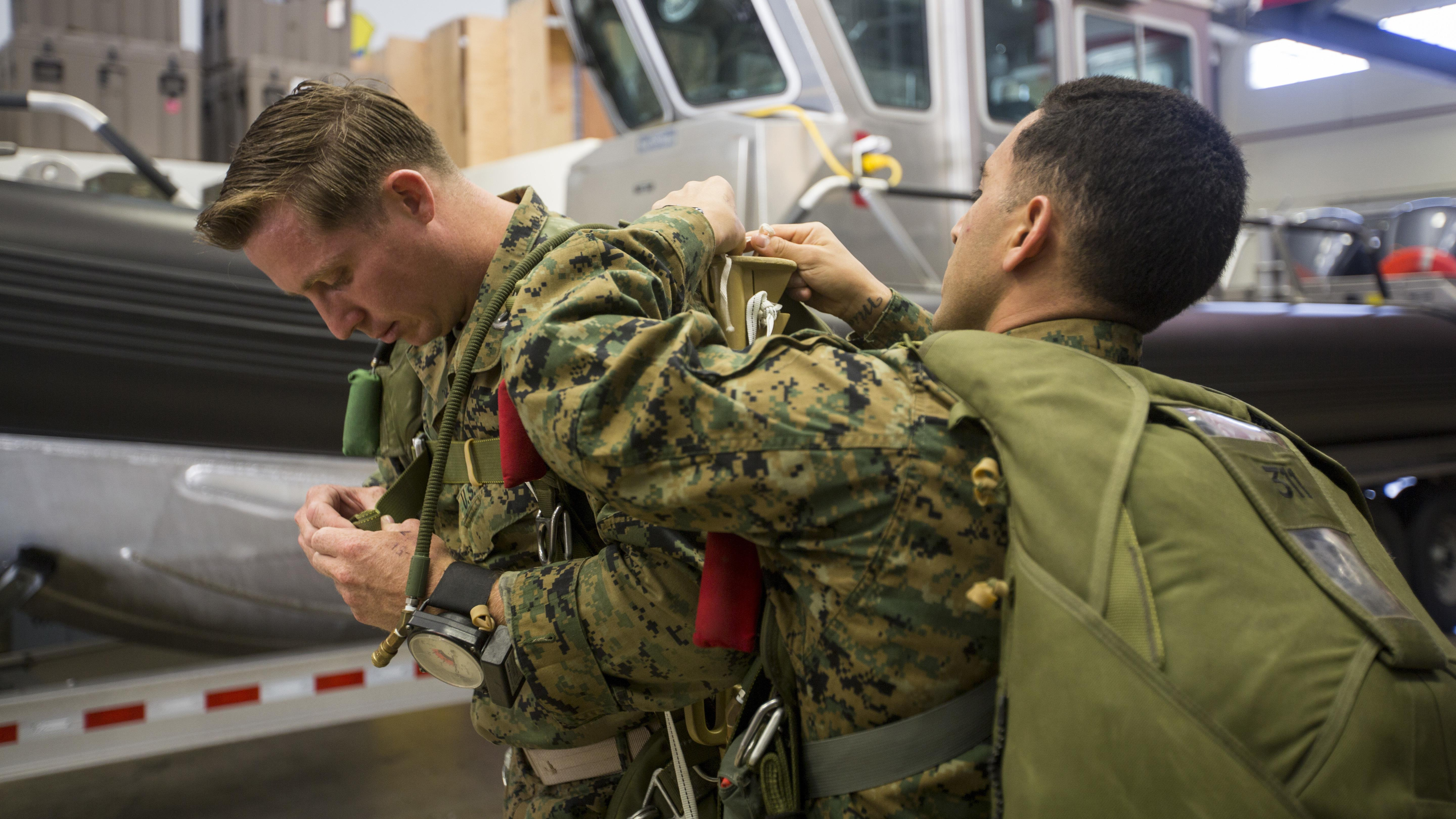
Marines from the 3rd Reconnaissance Battalion practice JumpMaster Personnel Inspection (JMPI) during the Military Free-Fall Jumpmaster Course, conducted by the U.S. Military Free-Fall School's Mobile Training Team at Kadena Air Base, part of the John F. Kennedy Special Warfare Center and School.

- Tactical Air Control Party – one per team
- U.S. Army Ranger School – all team leaders and above
- U.S. Army Reconnaissance and Surveillance Leaders Course – all team leaders and above
- U.S. Army Pathfinder School – all team leaders and above
- U.S. Army Jumpmaster School – minimum two per platoon
- Military Free-Fall Jumpmaster Course – minimum two per platoon
- Mountain Leaders (Summer/Winter) Course – one per team
- USMC Scout Sniper Course – minimum one per team
- Helicopter Rope Suspension Technique (HRST) Master Course – minimum two per platoon
- Dive Supervisor Course – minimum two per platoon
- LAR V Technician Course – two per platoon

=== Phase 2 ===
The second phase of the MTP also takes place during the MEU's PTP Initial Training Phase.

==== Training cell ====
The training cell (T-Cell) is regulated by the experienced staff non-commissioned officers (SNCOs) of FMF Recon company's Operations Section (S-3). This removes the responsibility of coordinating training from the platoon headquarters, and permits them to train with their men (rather than to just oversee the training).

"Train like you fight and fight like you train!"—quote by George S. Patton.

An additional advantage to the T-Cell is that it acts as a training ground for future platoon sergeants. Those assigned to the T-Cell are all highly trained and experienced operators. Some have deployed as platoon sergeants, and some have not. Experienced FORECON operators within T-Cell monitor, evaluate and improve the training to ensure that exercises meet real-world conditions.

- Advanced Long Range Communications Package (3 weeks) – It is conducted by the Company Communications Section. As the term deep reconnaissance indicates, the platoon will operate well forward of other forces. In order to report observations, calls for fire or extract, all members need to have a complete and thorough knowledge of the sophisticated communication equipment carried. It includes manual Morse code, and long-range high frequency (HF), satellite, multi-band, and digital communications.
- Weapons and Tactics Package (3 weeks) – Involves 5,000–8,000 rounds fired from the M4 carbine equipped with a Special Operations Peculiar Modification kit and the MEU(SOC) Pistol (.45 ACP). A live fire and maneuvering exercise in immediate action (IA) drills within close range of rotary wing support, as well as transportation, is conducted on the third week. As the Marines become familiar with their weapons, they conduct field exercise, force-on-force, live-fire drills using a militarized version of the Simunitions kit called the Special Effects Small Arms Marking Systems, or SESAMS. The Marking Cartridge ammunition contains a sabot and a small, plastic round encasing a colored detergent or paint, usually red or blue.
- Threat Weapons Familiarization Package (1 week) – Concludes "knowledge of weapons" with identification and operation of threat weapons used by adversaries of the United States. Threat Weapons include assault, automatic and mobilized weapons.
- Force Fires Package – Gives the Marines a working knowledge of fixed and rotary wing close air support and Naval Gun Surface Fire (NGSF) by using the AN/PEQ-1 SOFLAM to "paint" their targets.

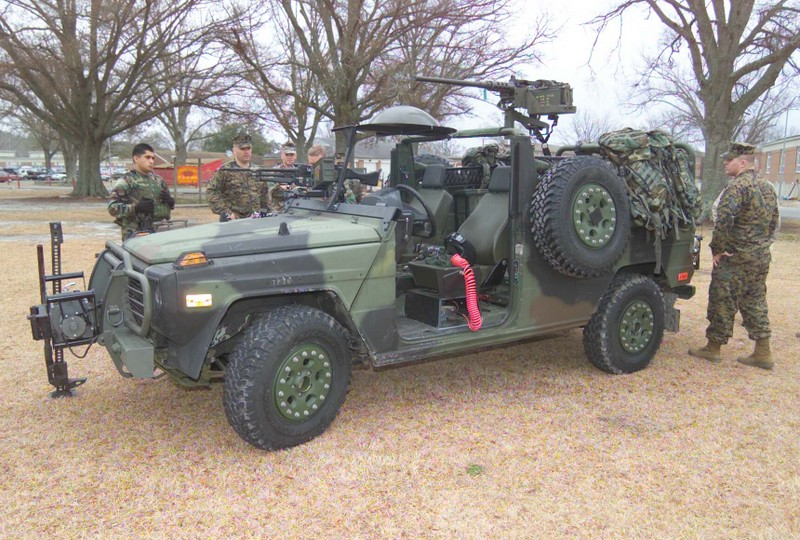
The Mercedes-Benz GDT-290 "Interim Fast Attack Vehicle" (IFAV) is a replacement of the Chenowth FAV desert buggy and the modified M-151A2 jeep), c. 2001

- Mobile Reconnaissance Package – Covers operating and maintaining the M998 HMMWV and the Interim Fast Attack Vehicle. Rapid deployment of FORECON requires fast mobilization. The current IFAV is a replacement of the two earlier FAVs, the M-151A2 and the Chenowth FAV that were employed in the 1980s and 1990s.
- Advanced Airborne Package – Used by Force Recon for inserting Marines behind enemy lines. In this three-week period, Marines have started the transition from conventional Low Level Static Line (LLSL) insertions into the hallmark HALO techniques. Usually it consists of consecutive night jumps with night combat equipment, but HALO training is done in the Paraloft of the S3 Section using a complex virtual reality-based (VR) computer system. While wearing a VR headset device, the Marines hang suspended from the Paraloft ceiling that resembles the MC-5 Ram Air parachute. Many simulations are factored in this Virtual Reality Parachute Simulation; it allows the Marine to jump at high altitudes and visually check his main canopy for proper deployment, alleviate malfunctions, to cutaway and deploy a reserve parachute, then employ guidance and control to an unmarked drop zone (DZ).
- Combat Trauma Package – Examination of first aid and medical treatment that can prepare Marines in many realistic scenarios where Marines can become casualties. This package is built for Marines to give them confidence and knowledge to apply medical attention to themselves or others while operating in hazard environments whether they are engaged in combat or not.
- Amphibious Training Package (2 weeks) – While Marines were introduced to amphibious reconnaissance from the BRC, the T-Cell outlines the Amphibious Training package before they are attached to a MEU(SOC), this package refines their ability to conduct amphibious operations, and conventional and selected maritime special operations capabilities incorporating all their skills for Marines to work as a team. Refreshes long-range nautical navigation, and refines the platoon SOP for conducting hydrographic surveys. Launch and recovery is from a variety of naval vessels, including surface combatants and submarines. This training takes place at Seal Beach and San Diego, California on the West Coast; and Onslow Beach, North Carolina on the east coast.
- Combatant Dive Package – Designed for concentrating on the unit's capabilities in the water. They will learn more about the LAR-V rebreather as they have been taught at the USMC Combatant Dive Course. The T-Cell will introduce the Diver Propulsion Device (DPD) and the "buddy line", a 15–20-foot (4.6–6.1 m) pipe made from composite plastics that every Marine is attached to when diving. This ensures that the team remain close together as the water may be impossible for visuals contact in subsurface swimming.

Other training packages are available to mold the Marines into a fully functional Recon unit, including long range patrolling in desert areas, such as Twentynine Palms or MCAS Yuma, mountainous terrain and other environments relevant in peacetime or conflict. At the end of Phase 2 Training, the platoon is completely stood up in all aspects of the long-range reconnaissance mission. More importantly, they have spent 6 months of 'platoon-oriented' training together.

=== Phase 3 ===
==== Special Operations Training Group (SOTG) ====
This six-month training phase emphasizing more in the direct action, or "black operations". It is conducted by the Special Operations Training Group (SOTG). This phase takes place during the MEU's PTP Intermediate Training Phase. These courses involves both aspects of maritime and urbanized environments and how to apply close quarters combat and science in demolition, gas/oil platform (GOPLAT) training, cordon and search, Visit, Board, Search, and Seizure (VBSS), shipboard assaults training and humanitarian operations. The recon operators get the chance to train in unfamiliar urban areas and maritime structures.

=== Phase 4 ===
Once the SOC Certification Final Training Phase is finished, the MEU with the detached Force Recon platoon as a functional special operations capable force. Then, they sail on a six-month deployment. This long deployment is known as the "Deployment Phases" to Force Recon; they sail from either three locations, off the East or West Coast, or Okinawa. The I MEF on the West would deploy its Marine Expeditionary Units (MEUs) to the western Pacific, and the II MEF's MEUs on the East Coast sail cross the Atlantic Ocean to either the Mediterranean Sea or the Persian Gulf. The III MEF's 31st MEU in Okinawa is to be used as a contingency for reinforced support of an area spanning from the Southwest Asia to the Central Pacific. The III MEF is the only MEF of the FMF that is permanently fully deployed at all times.

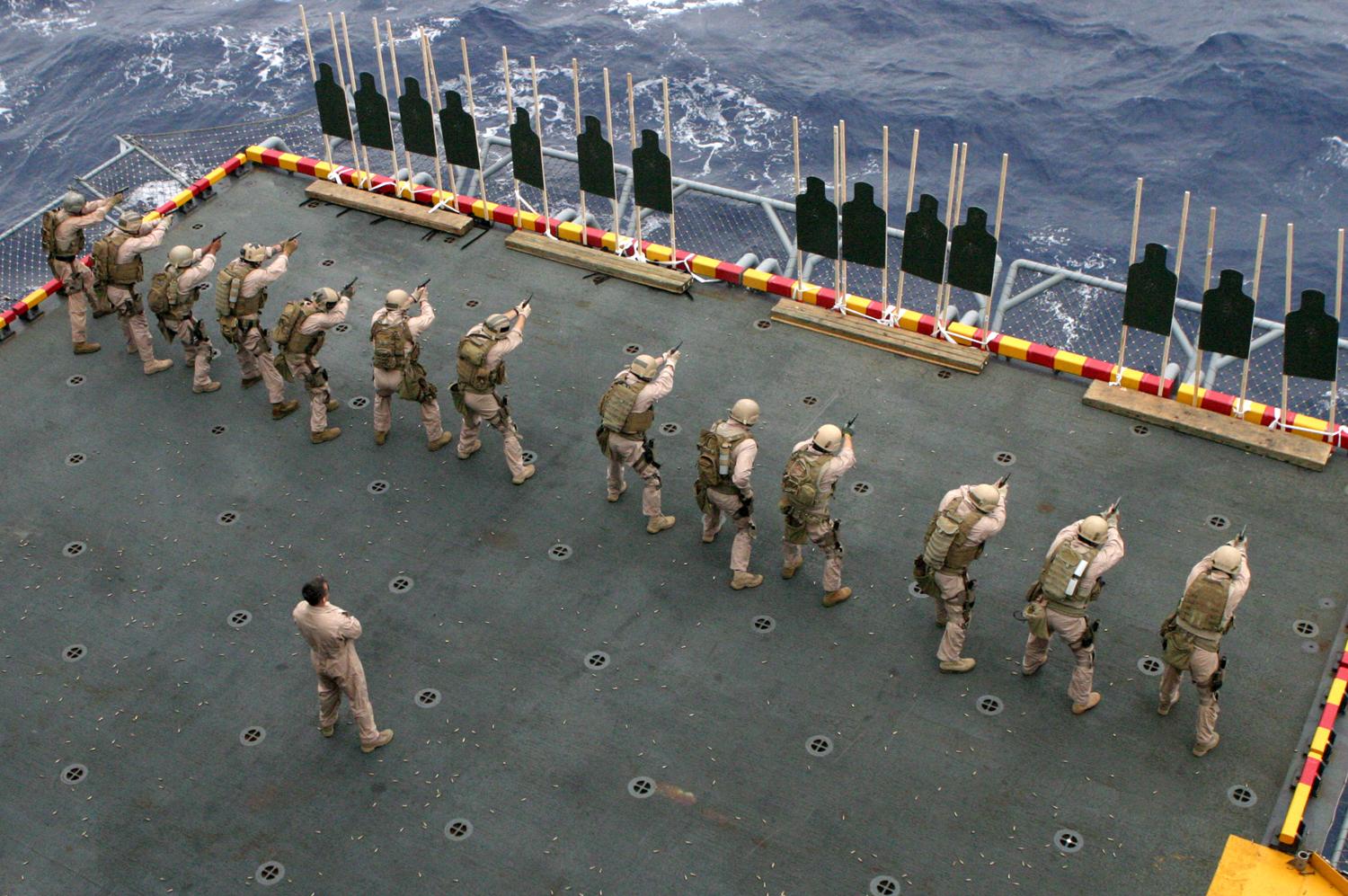
Whether garrisoned on land or aboard ship, along with their naval counterpart, training is constant while at sea. These Marines are firing a modified Springfield .45 ACP, the MEU(SOC) pistol.

While Force Recon is afloat, they still remain focused on their self-disciplined training sessions. They conduct small arms live fire training on the deck of the ships and physical fitness training. In many cases, foreign maritime forces alike participate in joint exercises or training maneuvers, such as the Royal Thai Marine Corps, British Royal Marines, and Australian Forces. But while they may be training, the MEU are capable of projecting fully forward deployed operational task forces. Thus, epitomizing the infamous Marine Corps slogan, "force-in-readiness".

=== Phase 5 ===
The last phase is the post-deployment phase. After 18 months of training and deployment, the platoon is granted 30 days of military leave. Once a Force Recon operator has finished deployment, they have a decision to make. What makes Force Recon unique from Division Recon, and the other SOFs, is the career style that is being placed in the Force Recon company structure. They can choose to stay with the Force Recon Company and continue their assignment with the MEU, recycling its loop cycle; or they can get release from the FORECON company and go back to their original assignment, whether administration, motor transport, or infantry. However, on average, approximately 50% of the platoon will leave, their time in Force having expired.

== Equipment ==
The primary weapons used by both Division and FMF Recon assets are typically the same standard-issued weapons in the arsenal of the Marine Corps. However, since Force Recon's missions are directly involved in parachuting and underwater insertions, they demand weapons and equipment that are essential to their job. Their equipment reflects on which ever tasks that have been assigned by the MAGTF, MEF, or MEU commander; either direct action (black) or deep recon (green) operations.

=== Table of equipment (T/E) ===
Some equipment only fits the needs for one particular mission over another. There is however some equipment that is used for both black and green operations, and these pieces of gear are usually combat vests, flak and armor jackets (or systems), and harnesses for use in hasty extraction measures.

Particularly during green operations, these missions normally encompass surveillance and reconnaissance. The equipment items carried into the field are usually cameras, scopes, and most importantly communications. Two recon Marines serve as radiomen in the team. Each team/platoon often brings two field radios that are able to withstand the elements of seawater, and rugged patrolling as they tread inland—if one radio fails, they resort to the supplemental radio. This is to ensure that vital information can always be sent to the commander, and to the S-3/S-6 shop, or similar intelligence collection agencies. More common in today's infrastructure, much of the intelligence-gathered information is sent to and processed by the Marine Expeditionary Force's "Surveillance, Reconnaissance, and Intelligence Group" (SRIG).

For black operations, the Marines carry weapons that are more of the close-quarter combative use; grenades, carbine rifles, sub-machine guns (SMGs), and any tool to use for breaching barricades and doors. They can be equipped with laser designating devices to "paint" their targets with laser-guiding coordinates to deliver payload to un-expecting targets. Since they are "bringing the fight to the enemy", they do not rely on camouflage as stealthy action is not a factor in these situations.

Equipment	Mission	Type
M4A1 Close Quarters Battle Weapon (CQBW): Special Operations Peculiar Modification (SOPMOD) M4A1 kit; M203 Grenade Launcher	Black	Weapon
M27 IAR	Green	Weapon
MARPAT Combat Utility Uniform (Desert · Woodland)	Green	Uniform
MARPAT Flame Resistant Organizational Gear (Desert · Woodland)	Black	Uniform
Combat Integrated Releasable Armor System (CIRAS) (Land or Maritime)	-	Combat gear
M45A1 Pistol with Safariland 6004 holster	Black	Weapon
Interim Fast Attack Vehicle (IFAV)	Black	Vehicle
Sniper/precision rifles: M40 Sniper Rifle; M110 SASS	Green	Weapon
M82A3 SASR .50 Anti-Materiel Weapon	Black	Weapon
M240 General Purpose Machine Gun (GPMG)	Black	Weapon
M2HB .50-cal Heavy Machine Gun	Black	Weapon
Future Assault Shell Technology helmet	Black	Combat gear
NOMEX Uniform (Desert · Woodland): Flight suit * modified for Force Recon operator use; balaclava; Aviator gloves; rigger's belt	Black	Uniform
Breaching shotguns: Benelli M1014; Mossberg 500; Remington 870	Black	Weapon
Improved load-bearing equipment (ILBE)	-	Combat gear
Long-range communications, radio and SATCOM: AN/PRC-148—Racal multiband inter/intra team radio (MBITR); AN/PRC-117F; AN/PRC-138 (V2 ICOM)	Green	Equipment
Observation scopes: Kowa TSN-822; DRS Technologies "Nightstar"	Green	Equipment
Man Pack Secondary Imagery Dissemination System (MPSIDS)	Green	Equipment
M2120 SOPHIE Long Range Thermal Imager	Green	Equipment
AN/PEQ-1A Special Operations Forces Laser Marker (SOFLAM)	Green	Equipment
Defense Advanced GPS Receiver (DAGR)	Green	Equipment

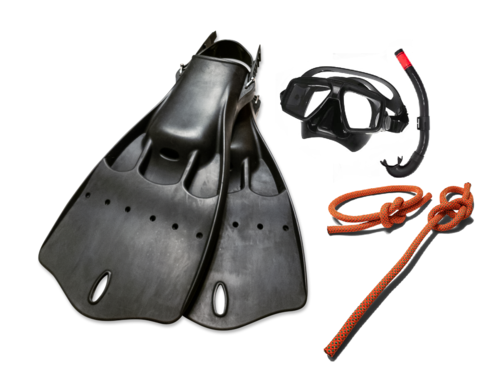
Amphibious equipment - Jet fins, low-volume mask and snorkel

=== Special equipment ===
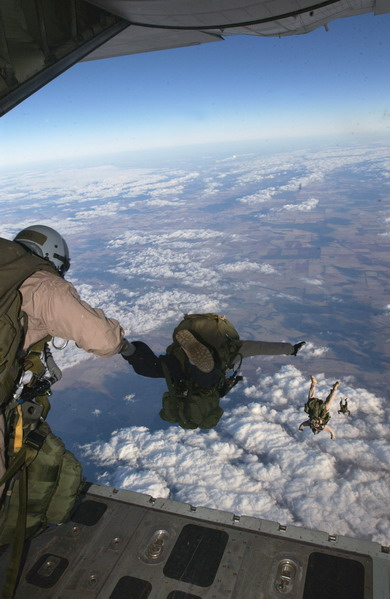
A six-man stick of team operators from 1st Force Recon perform a 'high-altitude, low-opening' (HALO) parachute insertion jump at ≈22,000–30,000 ft. above sea-level. —circa 2004

Throughout training and real life operations, jet fins, snorkels and low-volume double lens dive masks are used. In addition to the SCUBA equipment used in amphibious mission-essential tasks, Force Recon maintains and operates parachutes. This is the main difference and separation from Division Reconnaissance—all FORECON operators are required to be parachutists. The parachutist equipment is stored in the Force Reconnaissance's Parachute Loft.

==== Parachute pack systems ====
The parachute is one of the trademarks of Force Recon, throughout its existence the operators have extensively used a wide variety of parachutes. In the mid-1950s, they used the T-10 parachute, then later adopting the Capewell canopy release which provided a cut-away to reduce the deadly effect of drag. The T-10 became the most frequented parachute; which had two variants, one for low-level static line (LLSL) and the other for military free fall (MFF) descends. They had numerous parachutes listed under the Table of Equipment (T/E) that had been contained in the Paraloft. Even in its formative days in the Marine Corps Test Unit#1, the operators and testers of the Naval Parachute Unit (NPU) at El Centro had tested and sported numerous parachutes, adding modifications and suggestions that soon were adopted by other parachutists. By the 1990s, the MC-4 and MC-5 ram air parachutes became the feasible choice, as it allows more detailed and accurate landing in smaller areas, easy to control—especially during oscillation of the canopy. Plus, it was formed to modulate between the LLSL and MFF without having to consort to a different pack.

These are parachutes that are still contained in the T/E of the Parachute Loft, however some may not be currently in use:

- T-10
- MC1-B
- MC-series ram air parachutes (MC-4, MC-5)
  - Canopies (Main & Reserve): Surface area 370 square feet (34 m^{2})
  - Altitude range: 3,000 feet (910 m) AG> to 30,000 feet (9,100 m) ft MSL
  - Forward speed: 15–25 mph
  - Rate of descent: 4–18 ft/sec
  - Maximum Load: 700 pounds (320 kg)
- Multi-Mission Parachute System (MMPS) [currently being implemented—replacing the older MC-5]

==== Parachutist individual equipment kit ====
The parachutist individual equipment kit (PIEK) contains all the Force Recon's parachutist clothing and equipment assigned by Force Recon's Paraloft. They are used for the high-altitude MFFs (HAHO or HALO) and LLSL parachute operations. Due to extreme cold encountered during high altitude parachute operations, the parachutist must have protection from the environment.

- Gore-Tex jumpsuit
- Polartec jumpsuit liner
- Cotton ripstop jumpsuit
- Flyer's gloves
- Gore-Tex cold-weather gloves
- Overboots
- MA2-30 altimeter
- Helmet
- Flyer's helmet bag
- Flyer's kitbag—used to carry operator's rucksack, ammunition, communications, etc.

==== Single-action release personal equipment lowering equipment (SARPELS) ====
The Force Recon operators are equipped with a complete equipment lowering system for both LLSL and MFF parachute operations. It allows them carry various configurations of all their individual mission-essential equipment, usually contained within their flyer's kitbag. The single-action release personal equipment lowering equipment (SARPELS) provides easy access to their weapons and equipment upon parachute landing and has a single-action release capability. It can be front or rear mounted, whichever is preferred. Once they have descended to about 100 feet (30 m) above the surface, they use the SARPEL to release their gear (weapons/kitbag), dropping it below them while still attached to their harness by a 25-foot (7.6 m) rope. It is used to minimize injuries in landing due to heavy load of equipment. The parachutists must maneuver themselves in order not to drop onto their gear during parachute landing falls.

- SARPELS cargo carrier
- Horizontal & vertical cargo carrier securing straps
- Single-action release handle
- MFF eEquipment attaching strap
- 15-foot (4.6 m) LLSL lowering line
- 8-foot (2.4 m) MFF lowering line

== Annual Warrior Competition ==
The 24th MEU 2nd Force Reconnaissance Company won the 2010 Annual Warrior Competition against tactical units from all over the world.

== Creed ==
The Marine Corps Force Reconnaissance creed is as follows:

Realizing it is my choice and my choice alone to be a Reconnaissance Marine, I accept all challenges involved with this profession. Forever shall I strive to maintain the tremendous reputation of those who went before me.

Exceeding beyond the limitations set down by others shall be my goal. Sacrificing personal comforts and dedicating myself to the completion of the reconnaissance mission shall be my life. Physical fitness, mental attitude, and high ethics—The title of Recon Marine is my honor.

Conquering all obstacles, both large and small, I shall never quit. To quit, to surrender, to give up is to fail. To be a Recon Marine is to surpass failure; To overcome, to adapt and to do whatever it takes to complete the mission.

On the battlefield, as in all areas of life, I shall stand tall above the competition. Through professional pride, integrity, and teamwork, I shall be the example for all Marines to emulate.

Never shall I forget the principles I accepted to become a Recon Marine. Honor, Perseverance, Spirit and Heart. A Recon Marine can speak without saying a word and achieve what others can only imagine.

== See also ==
- United States Marine Corps Reconnaissance Battalions
- Marine Raider Regiment (MARSOC)

== Bibliography ==
- Field Manual (FM) 7-92, The Infantry Reconnaissance Platoon and Squad (Airborne, Air Assault, Light Infantry)
- Marine Administrative Message (MARADMIN) 417/07, Reconnaissance Marine Lateral Move Policy and Procedures
- Marine Corps Order (MCO) 1510.125, Individual Training Standards (ITS) Systems for Marine Combat Water Survival Training (MCWST)
- MCO 1543.12, Material Fielding Plan for the Combat Rubber Reconnaissance Craft (CRRC)
- MCO 3500.20B, Marine Corps Parachuting and Diving Policy and Program Administration
- MCO 3500.42A, Marine Corps Helicopter Rope Suspension Techniques (HRST) Policy and Program Administration
- MCO 3502.2A, Marine Expeditionary Units (Special Operations Capable) (MEU(SOC)) Special Skills Certification Program
- MCO 3502.3A, Marine Expeditionary Unit (Special Operations Capable) Predeployment Training Program (PTP)
- Marine Corps Reference Publication (MCRP) 2-1C, Marine Air Ground Task Force Intelligence Dissemination
- Marine Corps Warfighting Publication (MCWP) 2–1, Intelligence Operations
- MCWP 2–15.1, Remote Sensor Operations
- NAVMC 3500.55B, Reconnaissance (Recon) Training and Readiness (T&R) Manual
- Operational Requirements Document (ORD) for an Underwater Reconnaissance Capability (URC)
