= Surveillance, Reconnaissance, Intelligence Group =

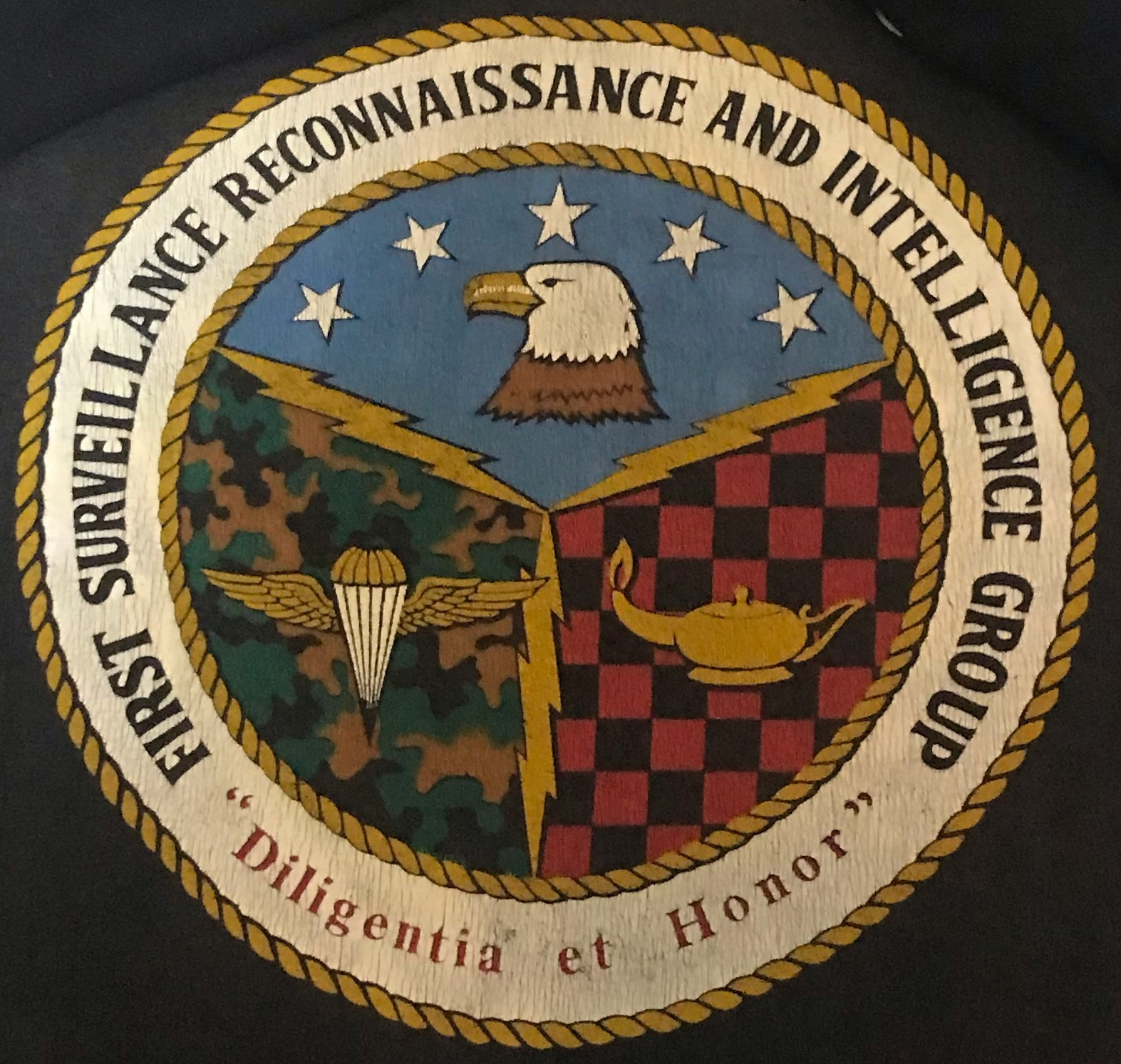
1st SRIG unit logo from 1990

Surveillance, Reconnaissance, Intelligence Groups (SRIG) were Marine Corps Intelligence, reconnaissance, and communications units of the United States Marine Corps from 1988 to 1997. The SRIG command structure combined units of Radio Battalion, ANGLICO, Force Reconnaissance, remotely piloted aircraft, counterintelligence, and other intelligence elements of the Marine Air-Ground Task Force.

== Mission ==
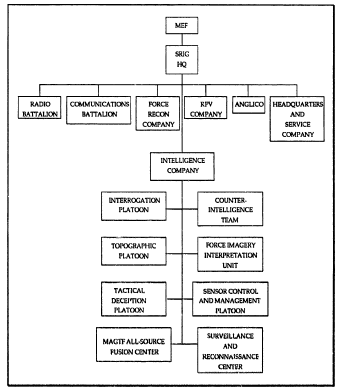
Command structure of a standard SRIG

According to the SRIG doctrinal manual, SRIG's mission was "to provide surveillance, reconnaissance, Marine Corps Intelligence, counterintelligence, electronic warfare, air and naval gunfire liaison, tactical deception, maritime direct action and secure communications to MAGTFs.

== History ==
The concept of the SRIG grew out of the Surveillance and Reconnaissance Center (SARC), created in 1969 to coordinate III Marine Amphibious Force's operations in the Vietnam War and by the desire within USMC to have the MEF HQ operate in a joint warfight similar an Army Corps with a supporting MI Brigade.

The first SRIG to be activated was the 2nd SRIG, in October 1988, under the command of the 2nd Marine Expeditionary Force at Camp Lejeune. 1st SRIG was activated in October 1989 at Camp Pendleton, and 3rd SRIG in October 1990 at Camp Hansen, Okinawa.

SRIG's first combat missions came during Operation Desert Storm. Members of 1st SRIG took the first Iraqi prisoners of the war, and later helped coordinate naval artillery and air strikes in the Battle of Khafji.

1st SRIG's activities in Somalia included Operation Restore Hope from 1992 to 1993 and Operation United Shield in 1995.

In October 1997, the SRIGs were dissolved and individual units were placed under the direct command of their respective MEFs in a MEF Headquarters Group (MHG). During the initial year of Operation Iraqi Freedom (OIF) the MHG was based in Camp Commando, Kuwait. During subsequent years of Operation Iraqi Freedom, including during the battle for Fallujah, the MHG was based in the former Mujahideen-e-Khalq (MEK) compound known as Camp Fallujah.
