= Hugh W. Hardy =

United States Marine Corps general

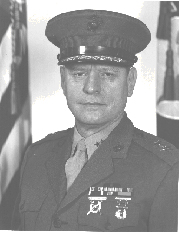
- Born: December 10, 1924; Shattuck, Oklahoma
- Died: April 3, 2003 (aged 78); Houston, Texas
- Military career
- Allegiance: United States of America
- Branch: United States Marine Corps
- Service years: 1942–1982
- Rank: Major General
- Commands: Marine Corps Base Camp Pendleton
- Awards: Legion of Merit
- Other work: Geoscientist

Major General Hugh W. Hardy (December 10, 1924 – April 3, 2003) was a United States Marine Corps Reserves major general and a geoscientist. Hardy served with the Marine Corps Reserves for 40 years. In his civilian career as a geoscientist, he had a 34-year career with Exxon which included pioneering research in well-logging and 3D seismic exploration.

== Early years ==
Hugh Hardy was born on December 10, 1924, in Shattuck, Oklahoma. He graduated in 1942 from Capitol Hill High School in Oklahoma City, Oklahoma. He then attended the Georgia School of Technology from 1943 to 1944, majoring in engineering. He graduated in 1947 from the University of Oklahoma with a Bachelor of Science degree in Geological Engineering.

== Marine Corps career ==
Hardy enlisted in the Marine Corps Reserves on December 2, 1942. He attend officer training at Georgia School of Technology (1943–1944) and recruit training at Parris Island, South Carolina (1945). He was commissioned a reserve second lieutenant upon completion of Platoon Commander's School. He was released to inactive duty in 1945 and returned to Oklahoma to complete his college education. He was subsequently employed by Humble Oil/Exxon.

With the onset of the Korean War, Hardy was called to active duty in August 1950 with Company B, 14th Infantry Battalion, USMCR in Galveston, Texas. In September 1950, he reported to Quantico, Virginia to attend the 1st Special Basic Course. He served with the 2nd Marine Division at Camp Lejeune from January 1951 to March 1952. He was released back to inactive duty in 1952.

He served in Marine reserve units in Wichita Falls, Texas; Houston, Texas; London, England; Camp Pendleton, California; Quantico, Virginia; Camp Lejeune, North Carolina; and in the Mediterranean with the 1st Battalion, 8th Marine Regiment, attached to the United States Navy's 6th fleet. He had command responsibilities and progressed in rank from 2nd lieutenant to brigadier general. In 1974, he was promoted to the rank of major general.

In 1980, he returned to active duty as Commanding General, Marine Corps Base, Camp Pendleton, California (the largest Marine Corps base, with over 40,000 personnel) becoming the first Reserve general to command an active Marine Corps facility.

Hardy retired from the Marine Corps on 1 December 1982.

=== Promotion record ===
Hardy's Marine Corps promotions are as follows:

- First Lieutenant — 10 November 1948
- Captain — 25 June 1952
- Major — 12 July 1956
- Lieutenant Colonel — 1 July 1964
- Colonel — 1 May 1969
- Brigadier General — May 1973
- Major General — 1 May 1974

=== Decorations ===
Major General Hardy has been awarded:

Legion of Merit		Navy Meritorious Unit Commendation	Marine Corps Good Conduct Medal
Selected Marine Corps Reserve Medal w/ 4 service stars	American Campaign Medal	World War II Victory Medal	Navy Occupation Service Medal w/ Europe clasp
National Defense Service Medal	Military Outstanding Volunteer Service Medal	Armed Forces Reserve Medal	Marine Corps Reserve Ribbon

== Geoscientist ==
1994 Winner of the General Hugh W. Hardy Superlative Performance Award for the Outstanding Marine Forces Reserve Unit for 4th Force Reconnaissance Company.

Hardy graduated from the University of Oklahoma in 1947 with bachelor of science degree in geological engineering. Upon graduation, he went to work for Humble Oil (later Exxon) on an offshore seismic crew. In his 34-year career with Exxon, Hardy worked at Humble Oil, Esso Production Research (EPR), Esso Exploration, Exxon Company International, corporate Public Affairs, and Exxon Company USA. His work encompasses a vast breadth of geoscience, administrative, and management areas, including seismic interpretation, seismic data processing, geophysical research, well-logging, computing coordination, emergency preparedness, government relations, and chief scientist. His research work at while at EPR included pioneering work on in well-logging formation/velocity/porosity relationships and in the 3D seismic exploration method.

After retirement from Exxon, he joined GeoQuest in 1981; and, in 1983, he was named president of GeoQuest International. In 1986, he resigned his position as president of GeoQuest's Services Division. He then established a private petroleum exploration consulting firm, Interpretation Consultants, Inc.

== Honors ==
The Marine Reserves award — the General Hugh W. Hardy Superlative Performance Award — was established in 1998 as an annual award to be presented to the most outstanding Reserve Force Level Asset Unit.
