= 2nd Force Reconnaissance Company =

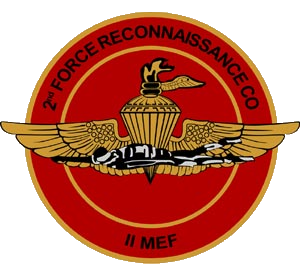
- 2nd Force Reconnaissance Company seal.
- Active: 1 June 1958 – 11 August 2006
- Country: United States
- Branch: United States Marine Corps
- Type: Force Reconnaissance
- Part of: Fleet Marine Force, Atlantic (FMFLant): II Marine Expeditionary Force
- Garrison/HQ: MCB Camp Lejeune, NC

The Second Force Reconnaissance Company was the deep reconnaissance/direct action that was assigned to the Fleet Marine Force, Atlantic and its subordinate elements of the Marine Air-Ground Task Force.

== Mission ==
The company augmented active-duty forces or were mobilized to conduct pre-assault and deep post-assault reconnaissance and surveillance in support of Expeditionary Strike Group Two and II Marine Expeditionary Force and its subordinate elements; 22nd, 24th and 26th Marine Expeditionary Units, the 2nd Marine Expeditionary Brigade.

== Organization ==
In 1958, the 2nd FORECON contained a headquarters and service platoon, pathfinder platoon, amphib recon platoon, and a deep recon platoon.

As of 2006, before its deactivation on August 11, 2006, its company table of organization was registered at a full strength of six reconnaissance platoons; one headquarters and service platoon, two direct action platoons, two deep recon platoons, and one scout sniper platoon augmented from 2nd Marine Division's Scout Sniper company.

== History ==
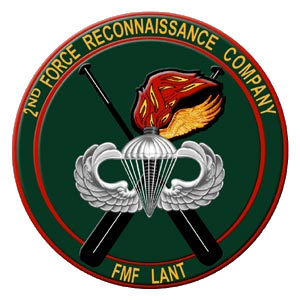
2nd Force Recon Company seal during the late 1950s.

2nd Force Recon Company was formed when the executive officer of 1st Force Recon, Captain Joseph Z. Taylor, took half of the Marines from 1st FORECON and brought them to the east coast to the 2nd Amphibious Reconnaissance Company, located on Marine Corps Base Camp Lejeune, North Carolina.

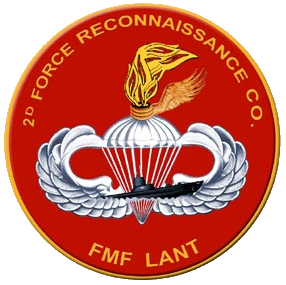
2nd Force Recon Company seal during the 1960s.

On 9 July 2002, 2nd Force Recon Company was reactivated as an individual unit separating from 2nd Reconnaissance Battalion after approximately six years.

On 11 August 2006, 2nd Force Recon Company was disbanded with the majority of personnel used to establish 2nd Marine Special Operations Battalion (2nd MSOB). Two platoons were used to establish D Company in the 2nd Reconnaissance Battalion under the 2nd Marine Division to maintain a deep reconnaissance capability for the MEF.
