= 2nd Reconnaissance Battalion =

- 2nd Reconnaissance Battalion insignia
- Active: December 1, 1950 – present
- Country: United States of America
- Branch: United States Marine Corps
- Type: Marine division reconnaissance
- Role: Reconnaissance
- Part of: 2nd Marine Division; II Marine Expeditionary Force
- Garrison/HQ: Marine Corps Base Camp Lejeune
- Mottos: "Swift, Silent, Deadly"
- Engagements: World War II: Battle of Tarawa; Battle of Saipan; Battle of Okinawa; Persian Gulf War: Operation Desert Shield; Operation Desert Storm; War on terror: Operation Iraqi Freedom; Operation Enduring Freedom

Commanders
- Current commander: LtCol John R. Eppes
- Notable commanders: Robert F. Revoir Daniel M. O’Conner Geoffrey L. Hoey; Eric Tee; Jeffrey M. Erb

The 2nd Reconnaissance Battalion (2nd Recon) is a reconnaissance battalion in the United States Marine Corps. Located at Marine Corps Base Camp Lejeune, North Carolina, the battalion falls under the command of the 2nd Marine Division and the II Marine Expeditionary Force (II MEF).

2nd Recon specializes in reconnaissance and surveillance, although its personnel are also trained in close quarters battle (CQB) tactics and other special missions. Recon Marines are sent to various schools to learn various special skills including: Scout Sniper, Jump, Military Free Fall, Combatant Dive, Ranger, various civilian run schools (i.e., McMillian sniper school), and other Department of Defense (DOD) and Special Operations Command (SOCOM) sponsored schools.

== Mission ==
The 2nd Reconnaissance Battalion's mission is to conduct ground and amphibious reconnaissance and surveillance and other operations as directed in support of the 2d Marine Division and to provide reconnaissance forces to meet II MEF reconnaissance requirements.

== Subordinate units ==
The 2nd Reconnaissance battalion consists of the following sub-units:

- Headquarters and Services Company
- Alpha Company
- Bravo Company
- Charlie Company
- Force Recon Company

== History ==
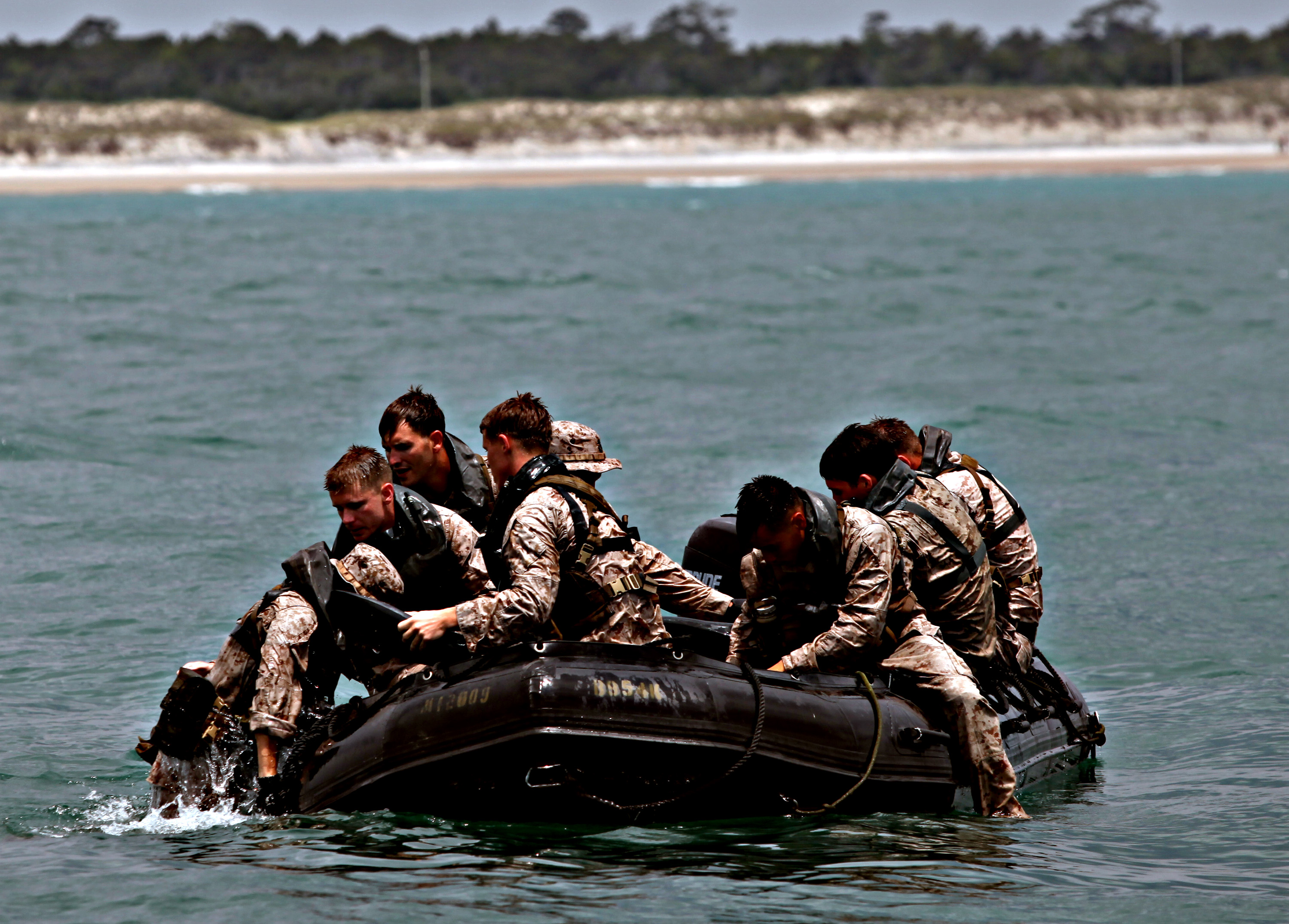
Marines of the 2nd Recon Battalion at Camp Lejeune, 2009

When the 1st and 2nd Marine Divisions were created in 1941, each had a Scout Company consisting of seven officers and 132 NCOs and enlisted men divided into a headquarters unit and three platoons. The unit was equipped with M3 Scout Cars and a motorcycle platoon. In 1949, the formation of an Amphibious Reconnaissance Battalion on the East Coast was approved and the battalion was officially activated on 1 December 1950 at a tent camp area at Lejeune. It was later moved to Stone Bay Camp. The battalion's first commanding officer was Major Regan Fuller. Upon formation, the new battalion perpetuated the history of the marine scout companies that had served in the Pacific during World War II.

=== World War II ===
==== Tarawa, November 1943 ====
In November 1943, the Marine recon units of 2nd Marine Division participated in the seizure and occupation of Tarawa Atoll, the site of a strategically important airfield. Prior to D-Day on November 10, no preliminary reconnaissance was performed except the submarine periscope photography taken by Capt. James Jones, of VAC Amphib Recon Company aboard the USS Nautilus (SS-168). The first ashore at Betio was a Scout-Sniper Platoon of 2nd Marine Regiment led by 1st Lieutenant William D. Hawkins.

Hawkins was tasked with securing the island ramp on one of the two long piers extending into the lagoon. He and his recon-scout platoon raced ahead of the first wave in two Higgins Boats and landed on the pier where they were placed under heavy machine gun fire. Since there were petrol drums at the end of the pier in the line of enemy fire, Hawkins sent most of his Marines back down the ramp then proceeded with only five men, four scouts and one combat engineer with a flamethrower. Once they burned and had blown up every hiding place left on the pier, they withdrew to the boat. Hawkins then commandeered three LVTs and transferred his men from both LCVPs to these for the trip to shore where they joined their regiment for the rest of the battle. Hawkins was later killed during this action and was posthumously awarded the Medal of Honor.

Another Scout-Sniper Platoon from the 8th Marines assisted in the main assault landing on D-Day, while the Company D (Scouts), 2nd Tank Battalion worked extensively in the seizure and occupation of other islands in the Tarawa Atoll. This included Eita and many unnamed islets between Betio and Bairiki. The adjacent atolls of Abaiang, Marakei and Maiana were inspected for fortifications, supplies or recent occupancy.

==== Saipan, June 1944 ====
During the Battle of Saipan, the 2nd Marine Division's scout company performed a series of special missions with 4th Marine Division's scout company, which included a recon detachment with 1st Battalion, 9th Marine Regiment (1/9). Seizing the summit of Mount Tapochau, the highest point on the island, they later repulsed a Japanese counterattack. Both Admiral Richmond K. Turner and General Holland M. Smith declared Saipan secured on July 9, 1944.

=== Cold War ===
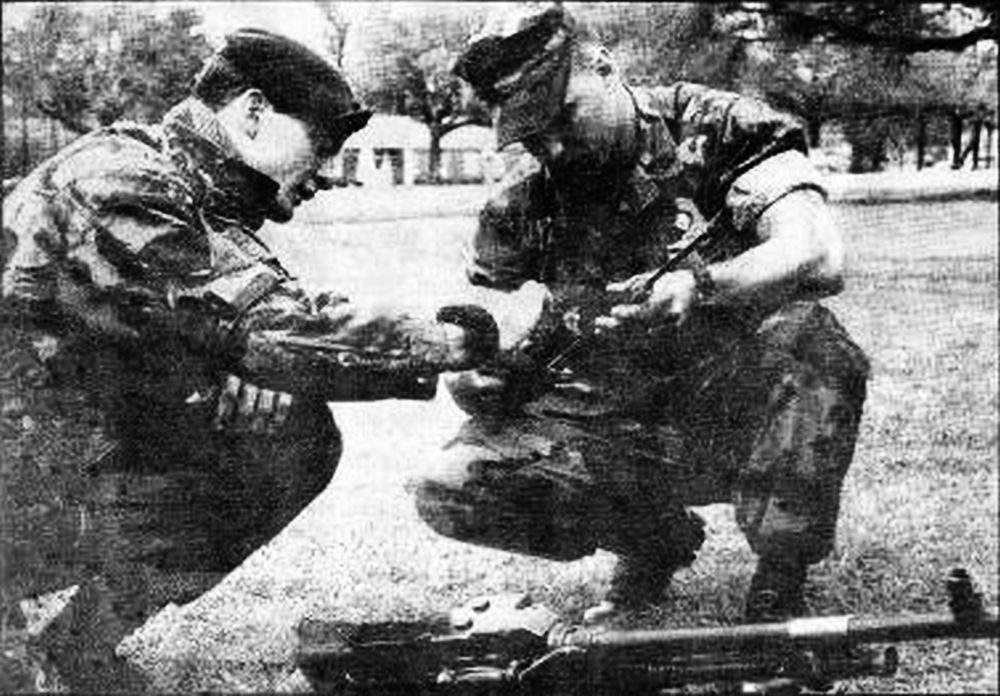
Sergeant Peter Aldrich of the Reconnaissance Platoon of the Royal Bermuda Regiment and Sergeant Paul Moose, a team leader in Bravo Company of the 2nd Recon at Camp Lejeune in Jacksonville, North Carolina, in 1989.

- Elements participated in the intervention in the Dominican Republic, April–June 1965.
- Elements participated as part of the multinational peacekeeping force in Lebanon, August 1982 – February 1984.
- Elements participated in the landing on Grenada-Carriacou, October–November 1983.

=== 1990s ===
- Elements participated in Operation Desert Shield and Desert Storm, Southwest Asia, December 1990 – April 1991.
- Redesignated April 18, 1994, as Reconnaissance Company, Headquarters Battalion, 2nd Marine Division.
- Reconnaissance Company and Force Reconnaissance Company, 2nd Marine Division, combined October 1, 1996, to form Reconnaissance Battalion (Provisional), 2nd Marine Division
- Redesignated January 1, 1998, as 2nd Reconnaissance Battalion

=== Global war on terror ===
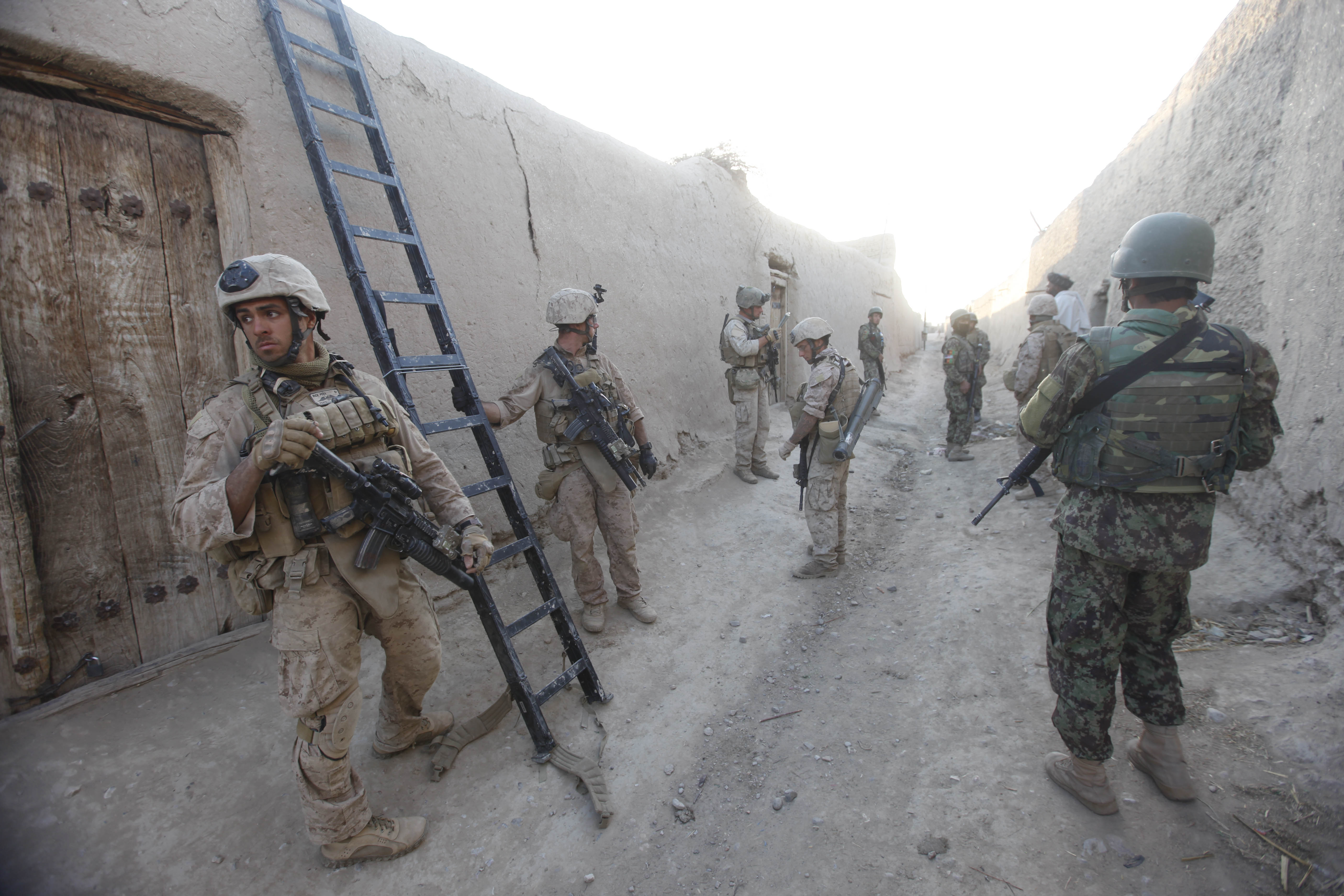
Marines from the 2nd Recon Battalion in Nimroz Province, Afghanistan, 2011

- Participated in Operation Iraqi Freedom, Iraq, March–May 2003.
- Elements participated in Operation Secure Tomorrow, Haiti, March–July 2004
- Participated in Operation Iraqi Freedom, Iraq, October 2004 – April 2005
- Participated in Operation Iraqi Freedom, Iraq, March–October 2006
- Participated in Operation Iraqi Freedom, Iraq, October 2007 – May 2008
- Elements participated in Operation Enduring Freedom, Afghanistan, February 2008 – October 2008
- Elements participated in Operation Enduring Freedom, Afghanistan, May 2009 – December 2009
- Participated in Operation Enduring Freedom, Afghanistan, November 2010 – June 2011
- Elements participated in Operation Enduring Freedom, Afghanistan, May 2012 – December 2012

== Unit awards ==
- Presidential Unit Citation (OIF I Deployment, CO A (REIN) attached to I MEF)
- Navy Unit Commendation (OEF Deployment)

== Trivia ==
A very loose interpretation of the battalion was featured as the main unit in the 1986 movie Heartbreak Ridge starring Clint Eastwood. The film depicts the battalion's involvement in Operation Urgent Fury, the invasion of Grenada.

A 2017 autobiographical short-story collection, titled No Joy, depicts life in the battalion from late 2003 to mid 2006.

== See also ==
- Organization of the United States Marine Corps
- United States Marine Corps Reconnaissance Battalions
