= 3rd Force Reconnaissance Company =

US Marine Corps Reserve unit

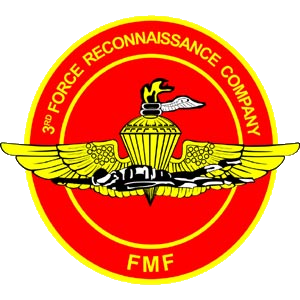
- 3rd Force Reconnaissance Company insignia
- Active: 1 July 1960 – present
- Country: United States of America
- Branch: United States Marine Corps
- Type: Force Reconnaissance
- Role: The company specializes in deep reconnaissance and amphibious reconnaissance for the Marine Air-Ground Task Force
- Part of: 4th Marine Division
- Garrison/HQ: Mobile, Alabama, U.S.
- Engagements: Vietnam War; Operation Desert Shield; Operation Desert Storm; Operation Iraqi Freedom; Operation Enduring Freedom
- Decorations: Valorous Unit Award National Defense Service Medal Vietnam Service Medal Southwest Asia Service Medal Vietnam Gallantry Cross Vietnam Civil Actions Medal Navy Unit Commendation Meritorious Unit Commendation

3rd Force Reconnaissance Company (3rd Force Recon) is a force reconnaissance unit of the United States Marine Corps Reserve. The company is located in Mobile, Alabama.

== Mission ==
3rd FORECON are operationally committed in supporting the subordinate elements Marine Forces Command (MarForCom) or the II Marine Expeditionary Force for direct support of operations and personnel tempo relief.

The company augmented active-duty forces or were mobilized to conduct pre-assault and deep post-assault reconnaissance and surveillance in support of II Marine Expeditionary Force and its subordinate elements: 22nd, 24th and 26th Marine Expeditionary Units, and the 2nd Marine Expeditionary Brigade.

=== Unit mission as of 2013 ===
3rd Force Reconnaissance Company: To conduct pre-assault and distant post-assault reconnaissance in support of a landing force. In addition, the company possesses the capability to perform the following tasks: Foreign internal defense, Limited scale raids, Capture selected targets, Conduct initial terminal guidance operations, Conduct specialized terrain reconnaissance, Conduct special missions requiring the use of entry capabilities.

== Organization ==
=== Chronology ===
- 1 July 1960 – Redesignated 1st Reconnaissance Company, USMCR
- 1 July 1962 – Redesignated 3rd Force Reconnaissance Company.
- 1 April 1965 – Activated as 3rd Force Reconnaissance Company, FMF for further transfer to the Republic of Viet Nam
- 5 March 1966 – Detachment (2 Platoons) of 3rd Force Reconnaissance Company, FMF deployed to Vietnam
- 9 June 1966 – 3rd Force Reconnaissance Company (-) moved from Camp Lejeune, N. C. to Camp Pendleton, California
- 15 June 1966 – One Platoon of 3rd Force Reconnaissance Company, FMF deployed to Vietnam in support of the 26 Marines
- 21 March 1967 – 3rd Force Reconnaissance Company, (FMF) (-) deployed to Viet Nam
- April 1967 – Redesignated 3rd Force Reconnaissance Company
- 22 Oct 1969 – Dropped from Operational and Administrative control by 3rd Recon Battalion, 3rd Marine Division and came under the control of III Marine Amphibious Force.
- Following Vietnam War, the unit was redesignated to Detachment 4th Force Reconnaissance Company,
- 1 January 1983 Redesignated 3rd Force Reconnaissance Company.
- 27 November 1990 3rd Force Reconnaissance Company (-) was mobilized in support of Operation Desert Shield/Desert Storm.
- 11 April 1991 3rd Force Reconnaissance (-) was demobilized and returned to the home training center in Mobile.
- 10 November 1996 (-) deployed to handle several covert operations, handled all extractions till 1999 in Iraq, Iran, Somalia, Afghanistan, Egypt, and where else the unit was needed. 1999 Unit was broke down to sub-units to make it easier to deal with many areas with better success as smaller better equipped specialized units. Many operations will never be declassified due to nature of the operations, and current status of Marines lives and family safety, some operations are above Top Secret. – Many and all awards given to Marines were also to have been classified under order of the Commander and Chief. 3rd Force Recon mission did not change till 2004.

2004 3rd Force Recon deployed several platoons to Operation Iraqi Freedom. 2007 Last Force Recon detachment returns from OIF. 3rd Force Recon suffered Sgt. Foster Harrington KIA during combat operations in Al Anbar Province. 2009 Det Echo mobilized for Operation Enduring Freedom. 2010 Detachment Echo returns from OEF deployment.

== History ==
=== Vietnam, 1967–1971 ===
3rd Force Reconnaissance Company was activated, trained, fought and deactivated during the Vietnam War. Activated in September 1965 as one of the first group of add on units to meet demands of operations in South Vietnam, 3d FORECON formed at Camp Lejeune, N.C. and satellite on 2nd Force Reconnaissance Company that was under strength due to the demands for trained Force Recon Marines assigned to 1st Force Reconnaissance Company in country. Facilities, cadre and equipment for training were provided by 2nd FORECON.

Volunteers were solicited from throughout the Marine Corps and the first four months were devoted to bringing 3rd FORECON up to strength in personnel. Beginning in January 1966 all operational personnel departed Camp Lejeune to train in the Caribbean and Panama.

Returning to North Carolina in March, final preparations were carried out to meet the projected deployment date in May 1966. The expected deployment of the entire 3rd FORECON did not occur, but a two-platoon detachment embarked on the USS Boxer, transited through the Suez Canal, and arrived in country in time to be introduced to combat in Operation Hastings as part of the Special Landing Force Alpha in early July 1966.

3rd FORECON (-) dropped to a not-combat-ready readiness status. Headquarters Marine Corps transferred several commissioned officers and numerous enlisted ([staff] non-commissioned officers) immediately after the Detachment departed.

In mid-June, 3rd FORECON (-) was alerted to deploy immediately. Due to the reduced personnel readiness status, HQMC changed the deployment plan and ordered that a Platoon be assigned to deploy with 1st Battalion, 26th Marines (1/26) that had been activated at Camp Pendleton. The remainder of 3rd FORECON was ordered to move to Camp Pendleton to refit.

At the conclusion of Hastings the Detachment was attached to 3rd Reconnaissance Battalion that had just arrived at Phu Bai Combat Base from Da Nang, having been replaced by the 1st Reconnaissance Battalion that had just begun arriving with the 1st Marine Division. Shortly, they were joined by the Platoon that had come in country with 1/26.

They patrolled in Thừa Thiên Province, until early January, 1967, when a task-organized "Special Purpose group" carried out a prisoner rescue attempt. The remainder were sent to Khe Sanh Combat Base where they developed the intelligence of a large enemy buildup, that was the prelude to The Hill Fights that occurred in April 1967.

Reunited, what was left of the three platoons, returned to Phu Bai to await the arrival of the 3rd FORECON (-). Having been brought up to strength and operational readiness, 3rd FORECON was reunited on 27 May 1967, just in time for the People's Army of Vietnam (PAVN) offensive to seize Quang Tri Province. The logistics element arrive at the "Ramp" at Đông Hà Combat Base just in time for the opening salvos of the PAVN artillery attacks that would continue daily until late Autumn.

The operational element experienced a mortar attack in Phu Bai at the same time resulting in several shrapnel wounds, only one of which, required evacuation. The new arrivals were integrated with combat veterans and the entire eighteen teams conducted a zone reconnaissance in the CoBi-Than Tan valley northwest of Huế before displacing to Đông Hà.

Upon arrival at Đông Hà in early May the Commanding Officer assumed command of 3rd Recon Battalion (Forward), which had reconnaissance responsibility for all of Quang Tri Province except the Khe Sanh Tactical Area of Operations (TAOR). 3d FORECON patrolled the area north of Highway 9 to the Vietnamese Demilitarized Zone (DMZ), while a recon company from 3rd Recon Battalion was targeted south of Highway 9 to the Thừa Thiên provincial border. Occasional circumstances caused deviation from that concept, but, for the most part, those deviations were rare. 3rd FORECON continued that operational commitment until the 3rd Marine Division left the country in November 1969.

3rd FORECON was placed under command of the III Marine Amphibious Force (III MAF) and operated in general support of III MAF until deactivated in July 1970.

=== 1990s ===
In January 1998, 3rd Force Reconnaissance Company was placed under the command of 4th Marine Division.

== Notable former members ==
- James C. Capers Jr., Medal of Honor recipient for actions in Vietnam
- Steven Palazzo, served during Operation Desert Storm
- Terrence C. Graves, posthumous Medal of Honor
