= 4th Force Reconnaissance Company =

US Marine Corps Reserve unit

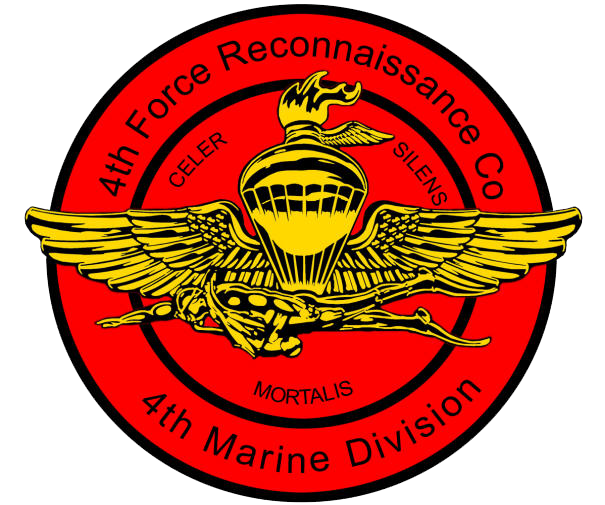
- 4th Force Reconnaissance Company insignia.
- Active: 1952 – 21 February 2021
- Country: United States
- Branch: United States Marine Corps
- Type: Force Reconnaissance
- Role: The company specializes in deep reconnaissance and amphibious reconnaissance for the Marine Air-Ground Task Force
- Part of: 4th Marine Division

4th Force Reconnaissance Company (4th Force Recon) was a force reconnaissance unit of the United States Marine Corps Reserve. The company was deactivated and has been consolidated as part of 4th Reconnaissance Battalion.

== History ==
=== Lineage ===
The company was activated 10 November 1952 at San Bernardino, California, as the 32d Special Infantry Company, U.S. Marine Corps Reserve. On 31 October 1957, it was redesignated the 32d Infantry Company and redesignated again on 1 November 1959 as the 4th Reconnaissance Company. On 1 July 1962, it was assigned to Force Troops, Fleet Marine Force. In October 1971, it was relocated to Marine Barracks, Pearl Harbor, and again in April 1973 to Naval and Marine Corps Reserve Center, Honolulu, Hawaii. In November 1996, it was relocated to MCB Hawaii with a detachment in Reno, Nevada. The company headquarters was moved to Alameda, California, with a detachment remaining in Hawaii.

=== 1990s ===
4th Force Recon Company provided deep and amphibious reconnaissance support to 1st Marine Expeditionary Brigade until the MEB was stood down from Hawaii in the mid-1990s. The unit also cross-trained with reconnaissance units from other countries during Cobra Gold in Thailand and Balikatan in the Philippines. In 1992, the unit crossed trained with the 61st Philippine Marine Recon Company in Ternate, Cavite, Philippines. In 1993, two teams conducted deep reconnaissance in support of 1st MEB during Operation Ke O'A Koa. In 1994, 4th Force won the General Hugh W. Hardy Superlative Performance Award for the Outstanding Marine Forces Reserve Unit.

In January 1998, 4th Force Reconnaissance Company was placed under the command of 4th Marine Division.

=== 2000s ===
4th Force Reconnaissance Company deployed to Iraq during the Iraq War.
