= GeoQuest Systems =

GeoQuest Systems was a company offering geology software, systems integration, and information-management services and software to the oil and gas industry from 1984 to 2001.

== History ==
The company was founded in 1984. Through its Seismograph Service Corporation subsidiary, Raytheon Company invested in and subsequently purchased GeoQuest Systems in about 1989. In 1992 Schlumberger acquired the company.

In 1993, Schlumberger merged its data services group, Finder Graphics, with GeoQuest Systems to establish the GeoQuest product line, based in Houston, Texas. In November 1995 GeoQuest acquired the ECLIPSE reservoir simulation software product line from Intera. In July 1999, GeoQuest acquired Merak Projects, a reserves, economics and field-optimization software company. In 2001, the company was integrated into Schlumberger Information Solutions (SIS).
