= Marine Raider Regiment =

US Marine Corps special forces unit

- Marine Raider Regiment patch
- Active: 2006–present
- Country: United States of America
- Branch: United States Marine Corps
- Type: Special operations forces
- Role: Direct action; Special reconnaissance; Foreign internal defense
- Size: 1,512 personnel authorized: 1,475 military personnel; 37 civilian personnel
- Part of: United States Special Operations Command; United States Marine Corps Special Operations Command
- Garrison/HQ: Camp Lejeune, North Carolina; Camp Pendleton, California
- Nickname: Marine Raiders
- Motto: Spiritus Invictus
- Engagements: War on terrorism: Operation Enduring Freedom; Operation Iraqi Freedom; Operation Inherent Resolve; Operation Juniper Shield; Operation Pacific Eagle – Philippines; Operation Freedom's Sentinel
- Website: Marine Raider Regiment Website

Commanders
- Current Commander: Colonel Anthony M. Mercado
- Previous Commander: Colonel John J. Lynch

Insignia
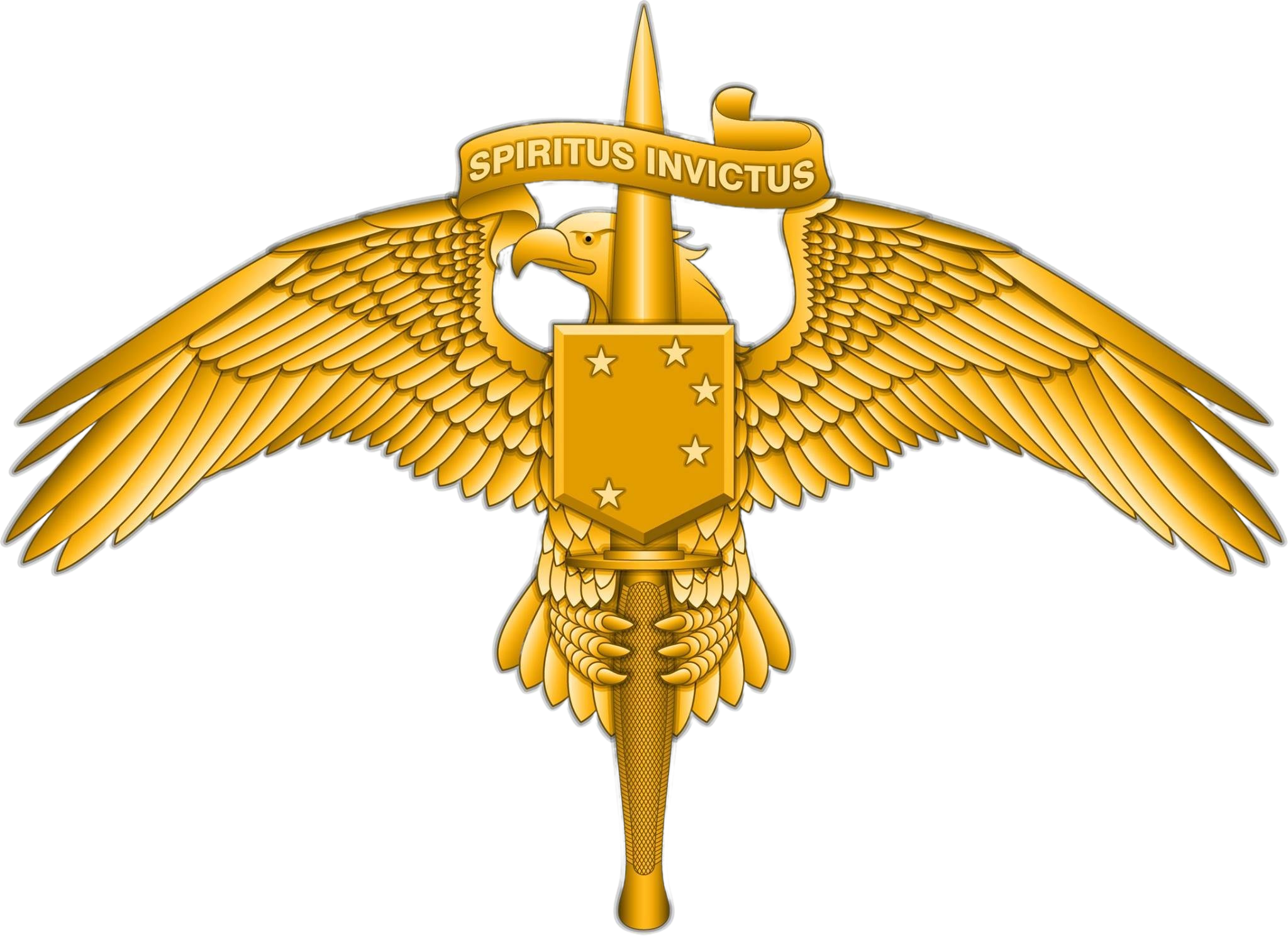
- Marine Special Operator Insignia qualification badge: MARSOC Insignia

The Marine Raider Regiment (MRR), formerly known as the Marine Special Operations Regiment (MSOR), is a special operations force of the United States Marine Corps, which is a part of Marine Corps Special Operations Command (MARSOC). Renamed for its predecessor, the World War II Marine Raiders, this unit is the principal combat component of MARSOC, which is the Marine Corps' contribution to the United States Special Operations Command (USSOCOM).

== History ==
=== Origins ===
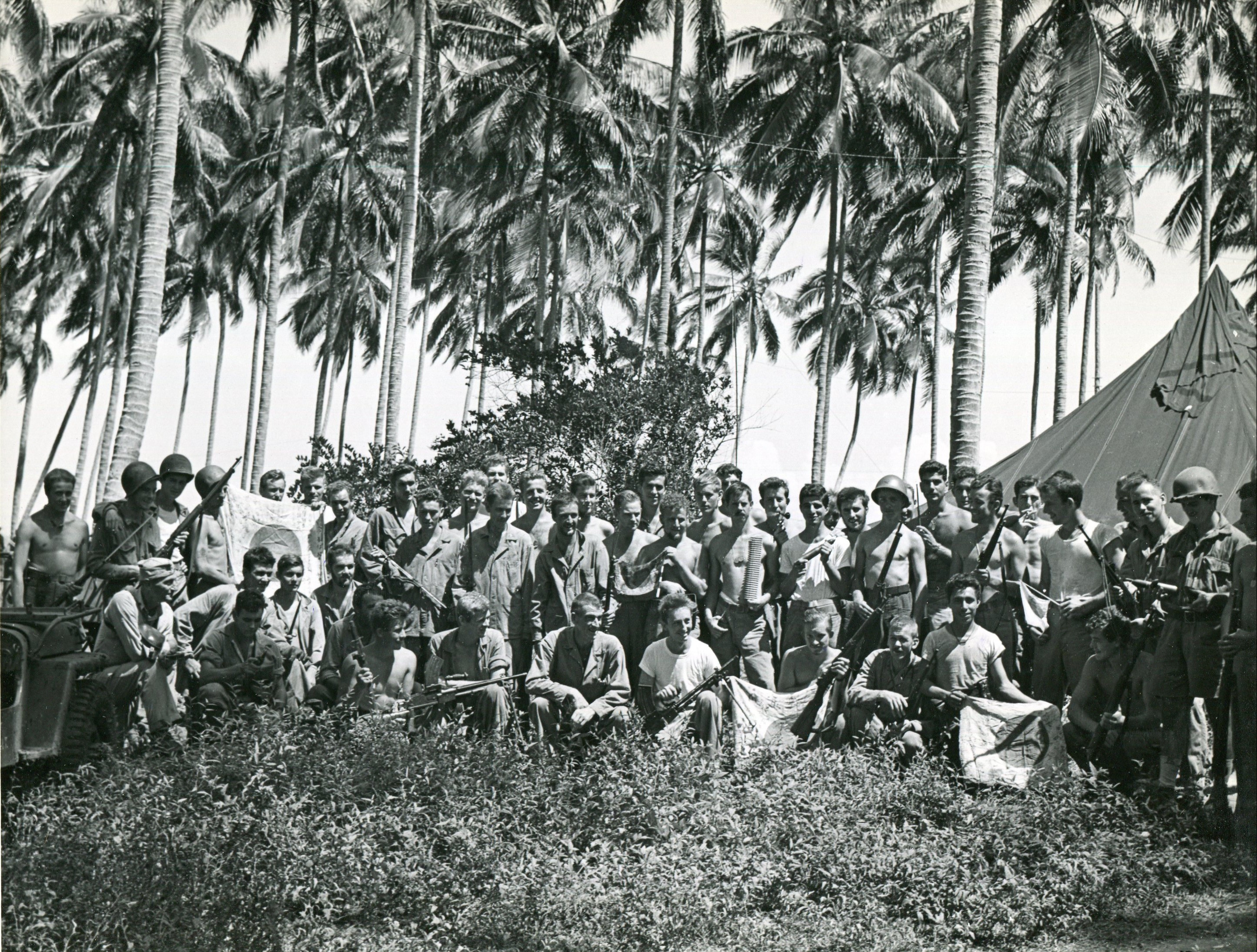
Evans Carlson and members of the 2nd Marine Raider Battalion with weapons and equipment captured from Japanese forces on Guadalcanal, 1942

Today's Raiders can trace their roots back to their World War II predecessors the Marine Raiders. The Marine Raiders were units established by the United States Marine Corps to conduct special amphibious light infantry warfare, particularly in landing in rubber boats and operating behind the lines. "Edson's" Raiders of 1st Marine Raiders Battalion and "Carlson's" Raiders of 2nd Marine Raiders Battalion are said to be the first United States special operations forces to form and see combat in World War II.

=== MCSOCOM Detachment One ===
Today's Marine Raiders began as a pilot program called the Marine Corps Special Operations Command Detachment One, also known as Det 1. In order to first assess the value of Marine special operations forces permanently detached to the United States Special Operations Command, a small unit of 86 men commanded by Col. Robert J. Coates, former commanding officer of 1st Force Reconnaissance Company, was activated on 19 June 2003 and had its headquarters at Camp Del Mar Boat Basin. In 2006 it was disbanded and succeeded by the permanent Marine Corps Special Operations Command (MARSOC). Det 1 deployed to Iraq with Navy SEALs from Naval Special Warfare Group 1 in 2004, and Marines from the detachment took part in the Second Battle of Fallujah.

=== Marine Special Operations Regiment ===
In February 2006, the Marine Corps Special Operations Command (MARSOC) was created at Camp Lejeune in North Carolina. The 1st and 2nd Marine Special Operations Battalions were created along with the Marine Special Operations Advisor Group (MSOAG). The majority of the combat personnel assigned to the two battalions were drawn from the Marine Corps Force Reconnaissance community. In April 2009, the MSOAG was redesignated the Marine Special Operations Regiment which then built in a new level of command by making 1st and 2nd MSOB subordinate, and redesignated MSOAG's operational marines the 3rd Marine Special Operations Battalion.

The first deployment for Marine Raiders was in Afghanistan in 2007. This initial deployment was marked with controversy when elements from Fox Company, 2nd MSOB were involved in a shooting incident. The incident, that resulted in as many as 19 civilians killed, involved a complex ambush by insurgents that included a suicide VBIED and small arms fire. It was alleged that the MARSOC operators killed the civilians while attempting to suppress the enemy firing points. The Marines were relieved from their operational charter in the country and their commander removed from duty by an Army General from USSOCOM after claims were made that the Marines reacted inappropriately and caused excessive civilian casualties. The Marines were later found by a military tribunal to be cleared of wrongdoing. Shortly after a deal was struck to send 2nd MSOB to Helmand province in lieu of the eastern provinces; in late 2007, Golf Company 2nd MSOB was sent to Helmand Province in Support of NATO operations.

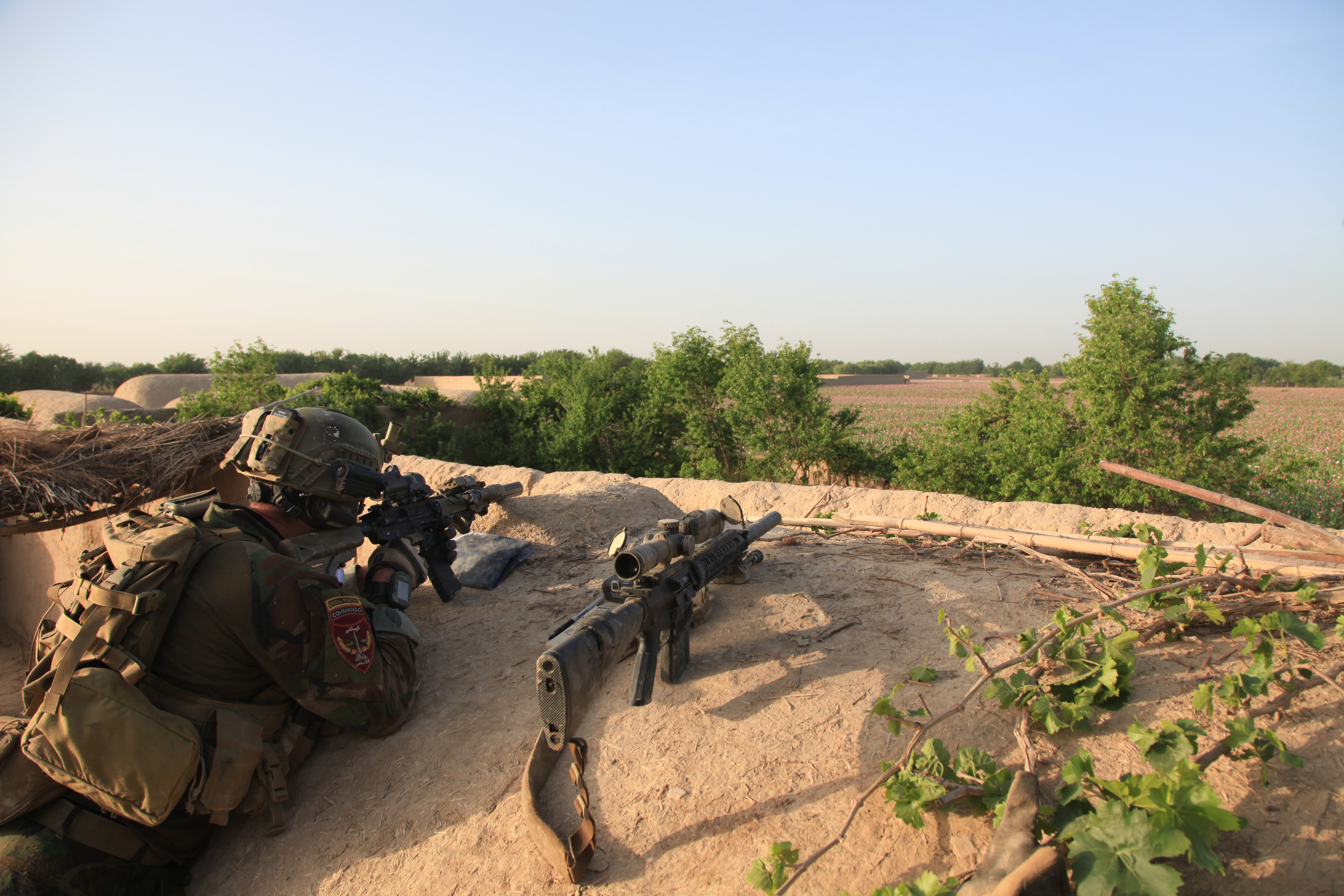
A Marine Raider with 1st MSOB, assigned to Special Operations Task Force-West waits in ambush for insurgents during a joint patrol with Afghan Commandos in Helmand Province, 15 April 2012.

In September 2009 the 1st MSOB returned to Afghanistan, this time in command of a joint special operations task force in the northwest of the country. On 10 November 2009, a Marine from 1st MSOB was awarded a Bronze Star with "V" device for his actions during a battle in Farah province. When the remote weapon on his vehicle was destroyed, he climbed on top to man its MK19 grenade launcher, according to his medal citation. As enemy rounds whipped by, Price stayed put—holding his position for four hours and killing "numerous" insurgents in the process.

Following General Petraeus's assumption of command in Afghanistan in 2010, in support of the ALP/VSO programme (Afghan Local Police/Village Stability Operations), SOF in Afghanistan were task-organized into battalion level SOTF (Special Operations Task Forces), each with a geographic area of responsibility; for MARSOC, this was western Afghanistan and Helmand Province. In March 2012, Marine Raiders suffered several casualties to Green on Blue attacks. On 29 July 2012, a patrol of Afghan Army Commandos was ambushed by insurgents from a number of buildings in Badghis Province, three Afghans were wounded by small arms fire, Gunnery Sergeants Jonathan Gifford of 2nd MSOB and Daniel Price of 1st MSOB raced forward on an ATV to retrieve the wounded under direct fire from the enemy. After evacuating the wounded to an emergency HLZ (Helicopter Landing Zone) from where they were safely medevaced, they returned to the firefight and assaulted the enemy positions in a fierce close-quarter battle. While throwing grenades down the chimney of an insurgent-occupied building, they were struck and killed by PKM fire, for his actions that day Price was awarded the Silver Star.

The Marine Raiders were deployed supporting the Global War on Terrorism in December 2013 alongside the 26th Marine Expeditionary Unit (Special Operations Capable) where they conducted various special operations missions, ranging from direct action, reconnaissance and other mission sets.

=== Marine Raider Regiment ===
In 2014, it was announced that the Marine Special Operations Regiment and its subordinate units would be renamed Marine Raiders. However, due to administrative delays the renaming did not become official until 19 June 2015.

A Raider from the 3rd Marine Raider Battalion was awarded the Silver Star for his actions during the terrorist attack on Radisson Blu hotel in Bamako, Mali in November 2015. The Raider led a team that rescued nearly 150 people being held hostage by members of AQIM.

Marine Corps Times reported that during Operation Inherent Resolve, Marine Raiders participated in the campaign to liberate Mosul in Iraq from ISIL. On 20 October 2016, after receiving small arms fire, a team of Raiders from the 2nd Marine Raider Battalion decided to occupy a point between two enemy controlled villages, later they were attacked by roughly 25 militants and an armored vehicle-borne improvised explosive device. A raider Staff Sergeant engaged and suppressed the dismounted enemy force with a sniper rifle, then exposed himself to enemy fire by climbing atop a vehicle to acquire an FGM-148 Javelin anti-tank missile and eventually destroyed the explosive-laden armored vehicle. For his actions during the engagement, the raider was awarded the Silver Star. On 30 December 2016, a Marine from the 2nd Raider Battalion was wounded as a result of enemy action in Iraq.

Marine Corps Times reported that during 2017, Raiders assisted in liberating Marawi in Philippines from ISIS-P militants.

In February 2019, Marine Corps Times reported that since the formation of MARSOC 13 years before, it had conducted 300 operational deployments across 13 countries, awarded more than 300 valor awards, and that 43 Raiders, including two multipurpose canines, had been killed in training and combat operations.

A master sergeant from 2nd Marine Raider Battalion was awarded the Silver Star for his actions in a firefight while leading a joint US-Afghan team during a raid on a Taliban stronghold in southern Afghanistan in 2019. Three other Raiders were awarded the Bronze Star for their actions during the firefight.

In November 2020, Taiwanese media claimed that U.S. Marine Raiders were in Taiwan for four weeks to train members of the Republic of China Marine Corps, according to the ROC Naval Command, though the Pentagon stated that the claim is "inaccurate."

== Organization ==
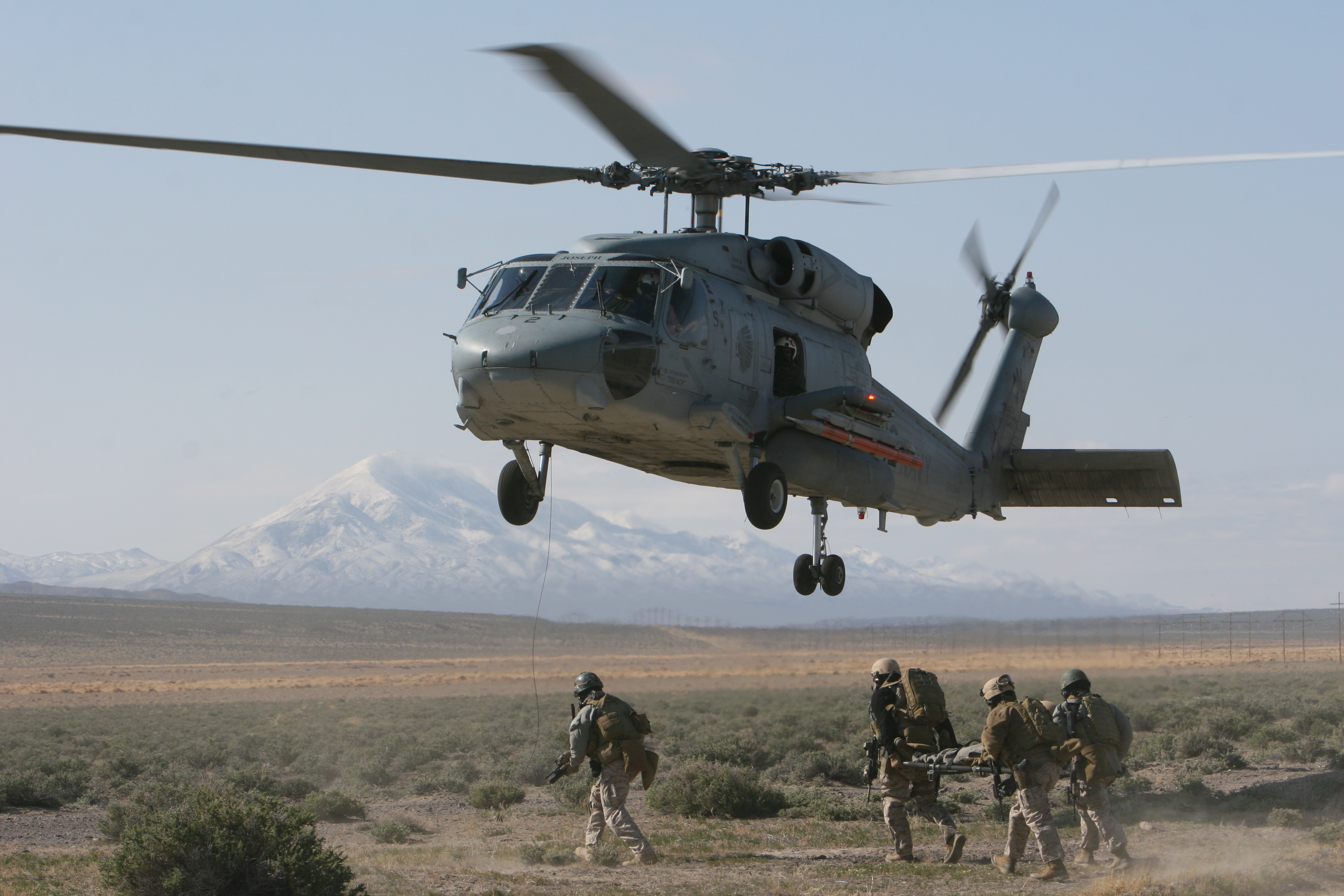
An SH-60 Seahawk waits for a simulated medical evacuation.

1st Marine Raider Regiment

- Headquarters Company
- 1st Marine Raider Battalion
- 2d Marine Raider Battalion
- 3d Marine Raider Battalion

The Marine Raider Regiment is made up of a Headquarters Company and three Marine Raider Battalions (MRB). Each MRB consists of four Marine Special Operations Companies (MSOC) and each company consists of four fourteen-man Marine Special Operations Teams (MSOT).

The base unit of the Raiders is the fourteen-man Marine Special Operations Team (MSOT). Each fourteen-man MSOT is organized into three elements: a Headquarters (HQ) and two identical Tactical Squads. The HQ element consists of a Special Operations Officer Team Leader (SOO/Captain), Team Chief (Master Sergeant CSO), Operations SNCO (Gunnery Sergeant CSO), and a communication SNCO. Each Tactical Element consists of an Element Leader (Staff Sergeant CSO), three Critical Skills Operators (Sergeant/Corporal CSOs), and a Navy Special Amphibious Reconnaissance Corpsman (SARC). The organization allows a Team to operate on its own if needed but maintains the ability to operate as part of a bigger unit such as an MSOC or SOTF (Special Operations Task Force), similar to Army Special Forces ODA/B.
