= 1st Marine Raider Battalion (MARSOC) =

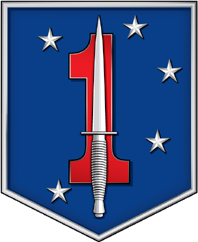
- 1st Marine Raider Battalion insignia
- Active: October 26, 2006; 19 years ago: present
- Branch: United States Marine Corps
- Type: Special operations forces
- Part of: Marine Raider Regiment
- Garrison/HQ: Camp Pendleton, California

Commanders
- Commanding Officer (June 2019): LtCol Theodore A. Bucierka

The 1st Marine Raider Battalion (1st MRB) is a special operations forces of the United States Marine Corps and a subordinate combat component of the Marine Corps Special Operations Command. The Battalions' organization was finalized in 2006 and is one of three battalions of the Marine Raider Regiment.

== History ==
=== Organizational ===
In October 2006 Marine Corps Special Operations Command (MARSOC) was created at Camp Lejeune North Carolina. The 1st and 2nd Marine Special Operations Battalions were created along with the Marine Special Operations Advisor Group (MSOAG, the predecessor of the 3rd Marine Special Operations Battalion). The majority of the combat personnel assigned to the battalion was drawn from the Marine Corps Force Reconnaissance. The battalion consists of four companies, each company consisting of 4 fourteen-man Marine Special Operations Teams (MSOT).

=== Operational ===
The Marine Corps' Special Operations proof of concept consisted of Det One deploying to Iraq with Navy SEALs from Naval Special Warfare Group 1 in 2004. The initial force structure for the Marine Special Operations Battalions were the 1st and 2nd Force Reconnaissance Companies which then deployed elements to Afghanistan in 2007. The first deployment was marked with controversy and Marines from 2nd Raider Battalion were relieved from their operational charter in the country by an Army General from USSOCOM after claims were made that the Marines reacted inappropriately and caused excessive civilian casualties. In September 2009 the 1st Raider Battalion returned to Afghanistan in command of a joint special operations task force in the northwest of the country.

== See also ==
- Marine Corps Forces Special Operations Command
- MCSOCOM Detachment One
- United States Marine Raiders
- United States Army Special Forces
- United States Navy SEALs
- United States Marine Corps Reconnaissance Battalions & Force Reconnaissance Companies
