= Marine Special Operator Insignia =

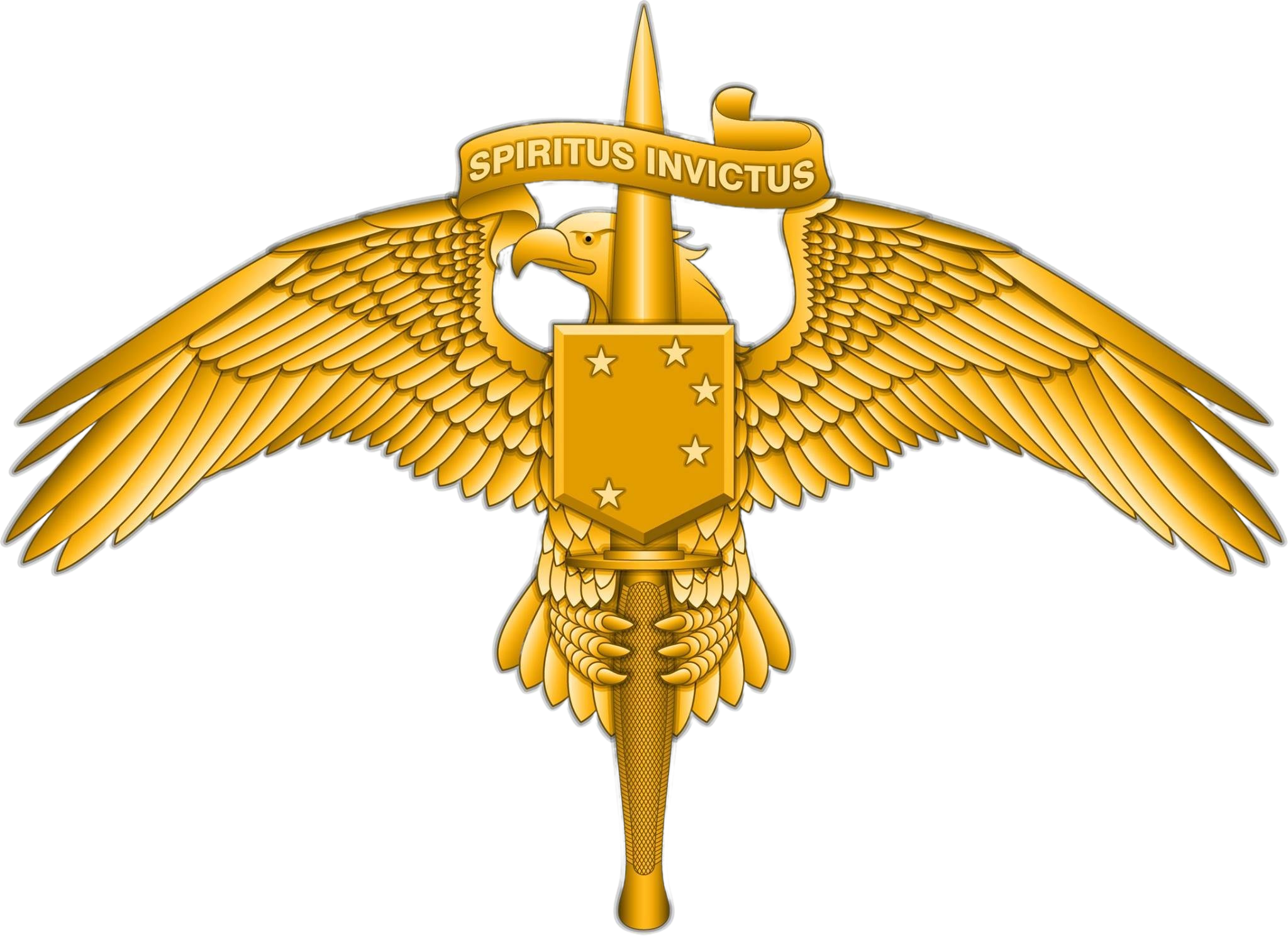
- Marine Special Operator Insignia
- Type: Uniform breast insignia
- Awarded for: Completing the MARSOC Individual Training Course
- Eligibility: Marine Raiders
- Established: 2016

The Marine Special Operator Insignia is a badge of the United States Marine Corps. The insignia is awarded to individuals who have completed the MARSOC Individual Training Course, and for those Marines who, before the insignia's 2016 introduction, hold the military occupational specialties (MOS) of 0372 critical skills operator or 0370 special operations officer.

The USMC Raider "Dagger" insignia is equivalent to the US Navy SEAL "Trident" in that the device indicates that the Marine is a part of the special operations community. Previously, the only distinction for Marine Corps special operators was wearing the combination of the scuba and parachute insignias adopted from US Navy Combat Diver pin and US Navy Certified Parachute Rigger wings (now known as the Navy and Marine Corps Parachutist insignia), which replaced the Army parachutist wings worn by Marines in 1968 upon special request, but were unofficially worn by Marine airborne unit members as early as World War II when first designed for graduates of US Navy Parachute Rigger school.

== Requirements ==
The Marine Special Operator Insignia is awarded to Marines with the MOS of critical skills operators (0372) and special operations officers (0370). To gain this MOS, Marines must have completed the Individual Training Course (ITC). ITC prepares Marines for global special operations duties, roles, and responsibilities over the course of 196 days. Marines then head to more specialized curricula. These Marines will complete at least 268 days of training before joining an operational unit. When the Marine Special Operator insignia is worn, no additional breast insignia is authorized for wear with this device.
