= Close Quarters Battle Receiver =

Close Quarter Battle Receiver
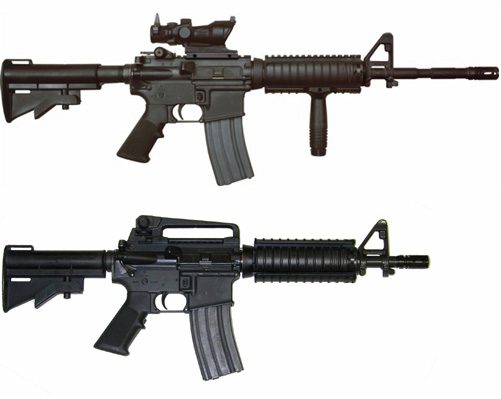
- Top: An M4A1 with SOPMOD Block 1 package, including Rail Interface System and Trijicon 4× ACOG. The barrel length is 14.5 inches (368 mm). Bottom: An M4A1 with a Close Quarter Battle Receiver. The barrel length is 10.3 inches (262 mm).
- Type: Carbine
- Place of origin: United States

Service history
- In service: 2000–present
- Used by: See M4 Carbine users
- Wars: War in Afghanistan; Iraq War

Production history
- Designer: Colt Defense; Daniel Defense
- Designed: 1999
- Produced: 2000–present
- No. built: 10,000+

Specifications (CQBR)
- Mass: 2.72 kg (6.00 lb)
- Length: 762 mm (30.0 in) stock extended 679.4 mm (26.75 in) stock collapsed
- Barrel length: 262 mm (10.3 in)
- Cartridge: 5.56×45mm NATO
- Action: Gas-operated, closed rotating bolt, Stoner bolt and carrier piston
- Rate of fire: 700–950 round/min cyclic
- Muzzle velocity: 2,585 ft/s (788 m/s)
- Effective firing range: 300 m (328 yd)
- Feed system: 20- or 30-round detachable STANAG magazine
- Sights: Iron sights and various SOPMOD sights

The Close Quarter Battle Receiver (CQBR) is a replacement upper receiver for the M4A1 carbine developed by the US Navy.

The CQBR features a 10.3 in (262 mm) length barrel (similar to the Colt Commando short-barreled M16 variants of the past) which makes the weapon significantly more compact, thus making it easier to use in, and around, vehicles and in tight, confined spaces. The overall length of the upper receiver is 19.25 in (489 mm). With the stock collapsed, the overall length of the weapon is 26.75 in (679 mm). Those created as complete rifles (rather than only upper receivers) are type designated as Mk 18 MOD 0/1.

Special forces units use the CQBR for scenarios such as VIP protection, urban warfare, and other close quarters battle (CQB) situations.

== Background ==
The M4 carbine and M16 are not ideally suited for all missions due to their relatively long barrels, but the modularity of AR pattern rifles allows the operator to easily replace the upper receiver. One of two proposed special mission receivers that were planned for inclusion into the SOPMOD Block II kit, the CQBR has taken off on its own. Like the proposed Special Purpose Receiver, the Close Quarters Battle Receiver has been more or less taken on by the Naval Surface Warfare Center Crane Division (often referred to as NSWC-Crane or just "Crane") as its own project following the CQBR's removal from the SOPMOD program. Just as the Special Purpose Receiver morphed into the Special Purpose Rifle, and was type-classified as Mk 12 MOD 0/1, the complete CQBR-equipped carbine has been type-classified as the Mk 18 MOD 0, or the Mk 18 MOD 1 with a sightless gas block and full-length accessory rail kit.

The purpose of the CQBR is to provide operators with a weapon of submachine gun size, but firing an intermediate cartridge, for scenarios such as VIP protection, urban warfare, and other close quarters battle (CQB) situations. The CQBR is designed to provide improvement over previous AR-15/M16-type weapons in this category. The CQBR is usually issued as a complete weapon system, and not just an upper receiver. The CQBR was once only available to Naval Special Warfare units (and by extension, other US Special Operations Forces units), but the Mk 18 MOD 0 has become general issue for Visit, Board, Search, and Seizure (VBSS) missions and, as of 2006, for NCIS agents deploying to active combat zones. The Mk 18 is also used by the Coast Guard's Maritime Law Enforcement Specialists within both Deployable Specialized Forces and Tactical Law Enforcement Teams, as well as the United States Navy's Explosive Ordnance Disposal (EOD) Operators. It is also used by both Marine Force Recon Teams and Critical Skills operators from MARSOC, and is in most cases the standard weapons of choice for said operators where the range of an M4 is not necessary.

The short 10.3 in (262mm) barrel length requires special modifications to function reliably. The gas port is opened from 0.062 to 0.070 in (1.6 to 1.8mm). A one-piece McFarland gas ring replaces the three-piece gas ring set. The standard four-coil extractor spring is replaced with a commercial off-the-shelf (COTS) five-coil spring. An O-ring surrounds the extractor spring. The standard M4 flash hider has been replaced with the M4QD flash hider for suppressor compatibility.

== Ballistic performance ==
Shortening the barrel by 50% from the original 20 inches (508 mm) pattern has a dramatic effect on the velocity of 5.56×45mm NATO ammunition. This has been demonstrated in studies using a Remington 700 bolt-action rifle, progressively shortened in barrel length and chronographed. With a barrel length of 20 inches (510 mm), the bullet travels at a velocity of 3,071 ft/s (936 m/s). This is reduced to 2,489 ft/s (759 m/s) from a barrel length of 10 inches (250 mm).

== Evolution ==
- CQBR type 1: Made from M4A1 uppers by shortening the barrels and opening gas ports, no longer produced, STD carbine buffer in use in host lowers at time of fielding.
- CQBR type 2: NSWC assembled with contracted and /or overhauled parts complete with all accessories to current standards at time of build, will work with H, H2 or H3 balanced to ammo requirements:
  - H works with M193 and M855.
  - H2 needed for MK 262, MK 255 R2LP, or MK 311 R2LP; will still reliably feed and fire M193/M855.
  - H3 may be needed for an extreme case, or when the gas port is eroded but the barrel still groups.
- CQBR type 2A: NSWC assembled with contracted and/or overhauled parts, naked without any accessories or buffer. The buffer in the host carbine would be used or upgraded as necessary via the supply system same as type 2.
- CQBR type 3: Colt-contracted upper, complete with all accessories. NO buffer supplied. The buffer in the host carbine would be used or upgraded as necessary via the supply system same as type 2.
- CQBR type 3A: Colt-contracted upper, naked without any accessories or buffer supplied. The buffer in the host carbine would be used or upgraded as necessary via the supply system same as type 2.
- Mk 18 type 1: NSWC assembled carbine with contracted and/or overhauled parts complete with all accessories to current standards at time of build; will work with H or H2 and could have shipped with either. Units will balance buffer to ammo requirements:
  - H works with M193 and M855. (All shipboard Mk 18's should have H buffers as this was the standard at the time of assembly.)
  - H2 needed for Mk 262, Mk 255 R2LP, or Mk 311 R2LP; will still reliably run M193/M855.
  - H3 may be needed for an extreme cases or when the gas port is eroded but the barrel still groups.
- Mk 18 type 2: Colt-contracted carbine complete with all accessories (H buffer supplied). Units will balance buffer to ammo requirements same as Mk 18 type 1.
- Mk 18 MOD 0: Designation given to the full rifle, consisting of CQBR upper receiver and M16A1 lower receiver
- Mk 18 MOD 1: Similar to the changes found in the SOPMOD Block II kit, the MOD 1 features a gas block end without a front sight and a railed handguard, by Daniel Defense, that extends all the way to the base of the flash hider to provide more accessory rail space for the user.
- Mk 18 URG-I: The Upper Receiver Group - Improved (URG-I) features a gas block end without a front sight and a railed M-LOK handguard, by Geissele Automatics. The URG-I also replaces the Mk 18 MOD 1's heavier SOCOM barrel with a standard "government" profile cold hammer forged barrel with a longer gas system. Primarily used by AFSOC.

== Specifications ==
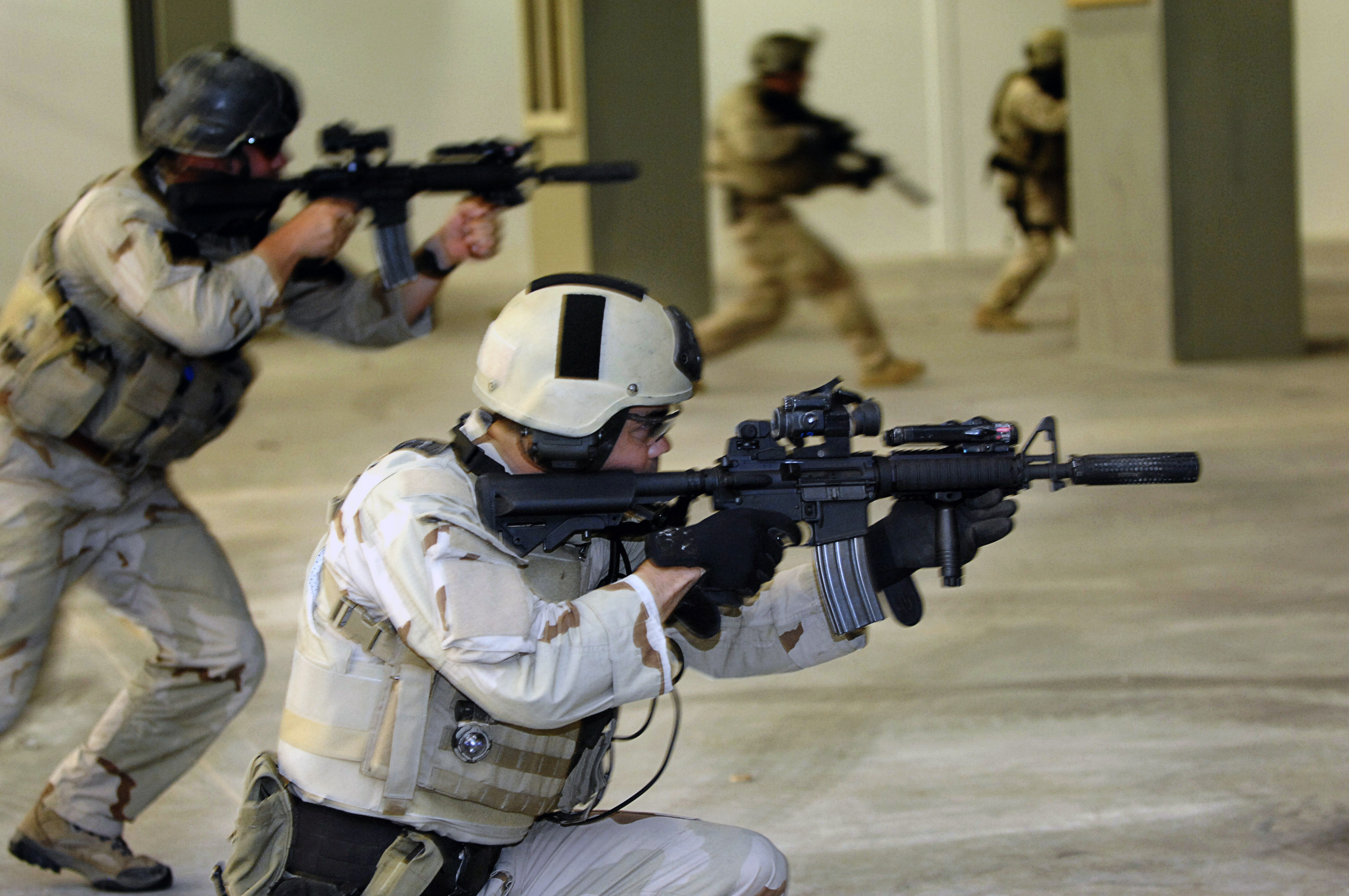
Navy SEALs armed with CQBRs conduct Shoot House Training at Little Creek, Virginia in mid 2007. Each M4A1 CQBR is equipped with the Aimpoint CompM2 M68 Close Combat Optic, Knight's Armament QD suppressor and AN/PEQ-2.

- Upper and lower receivers: The lower receiver is a standard M4A1 lower receiver, sometimes modified with the addition of a CQD RSM sling adapter plate. However, many CQBR rifles also use surplus M16A1 lower receivers. Internally, the CQBR also takes advantage of a larger gas port and modified bolt carrier and buffer assembly. The gas port has been opened to 0.070 in (1.8 mm). A number of Lewis Machine & Tool 10.5" (266.7 mm) upper receivers have also been reported to have been purchased for the CQBR program. These upper receivers feature a gas system optimized for short barrel use. The MOD 1 makes use of a forward sight delete and full-length handguard to provide more rail space for the user.
- Sights: Initially, detachable carrying handles cut down so that only the rear sight assembly were used. However, most of these have been replaced with the similar, commercially-made Lewis Machine & Tool fixed rear sight, as well as adjustable sights from LMT, Matech and Knights Armament. Front sight posts are typically the standard Colt FSP. Also used are several types of reflex and magnified optics. Most commonly seen is the Aimpoint CompM2 in a Wilcox Industries Corp. Picatinny (MIL-STD-1913) mount; however holographic sights such as the Eotech 553/SU-231, Eotech EXPS3-0/SU-231a, and magnified sights such as the Elcan SpecterDR 1-4/SU-230 FDE w/ L3 MRDS/Docter or the addition of sight magnifiers like Eotech G33 Anodized magnifier to the aforementioned sights are common. On the MOD 1, the front sight is deleted and a full-length accessory rail is used; flip up iron sights may be mounted per user preferences.
- Stock: A variety of M4 retractable buttstocks are used on a standard 4-position receiver extension, including the standard "CAR" stock. The SOPMOD stock, often referred to as the "Crane stock", created by Dave Armstrong of NSWC-Crane is commonly used. The angled stock offers better cheekweld and provides two storage compartments for spare batteries. The stock must be removed from the weapon to access the storage compartments. The initial run of stocks was made by NSWC-Crane from glass fiber polymer. Because of this, they were somewhat fragile and did not always properly lock into the receiver extension. A rubber band was used to secure the latch so it would not slide out of the desired position. The current L7LA2B SOPMOD stocks are made by Lewis Machine & Tools and have none of these problems.
- Barrel: The CQBR uses a 1:7 in (178 mm) twist M4 barrel that has been modified in length to 10.3 in (262 mm). The diameter of the barrel under the handguards is 1.17 in (29.7 mm). The KAC M4-QD flash suppressor is fitted, allowing use of the KAC QDSS-NT4 suppressor (National Stock Number 1005-01-437-0324). Although it has a bayonet lug, the CQBR is not meant to be fitted with a bayonet.
- Handguards: The standard handguard for the CQBR is the Knight's Armament Company Rail Interface System (M4 Carbine RIS; National Stock Number 1005-01-416-1089), which is designed for a variety of barrel profiles and allows for the use of any MIL-STD-1913 tactical accessories such as the AN/PEQ-2, AN/PEQ-15, SureFire flashlights, or a vertical forward grip. MOD 1/Block II changes incorporated the Daniel Defense's MK18 RIS, NSN # 1005-01-548-1385. The current standard handguard on URG-I improved variants is a Geissele Automatics M-LOK railed system for greater compatibility with modern accessory mounting solutions at a lighter weight than previous iterations.
- Ammunition: The CQBR is designed to use standard 5.56×45mm NATO 62-grain SS109/M855 FMJ and M856 Tracer ammunition. However, due to the short barrel, the heavier 77-grain Mk 262 cartridge is preferred. There are no plans to rechamber the weapon in any additional calibers.

== See also ==
- List of individual weapons of the U.S. Armed Forces
- List of assault rifles
- United States Army Special Forces
