= Mark A. Clark (general) =

American general

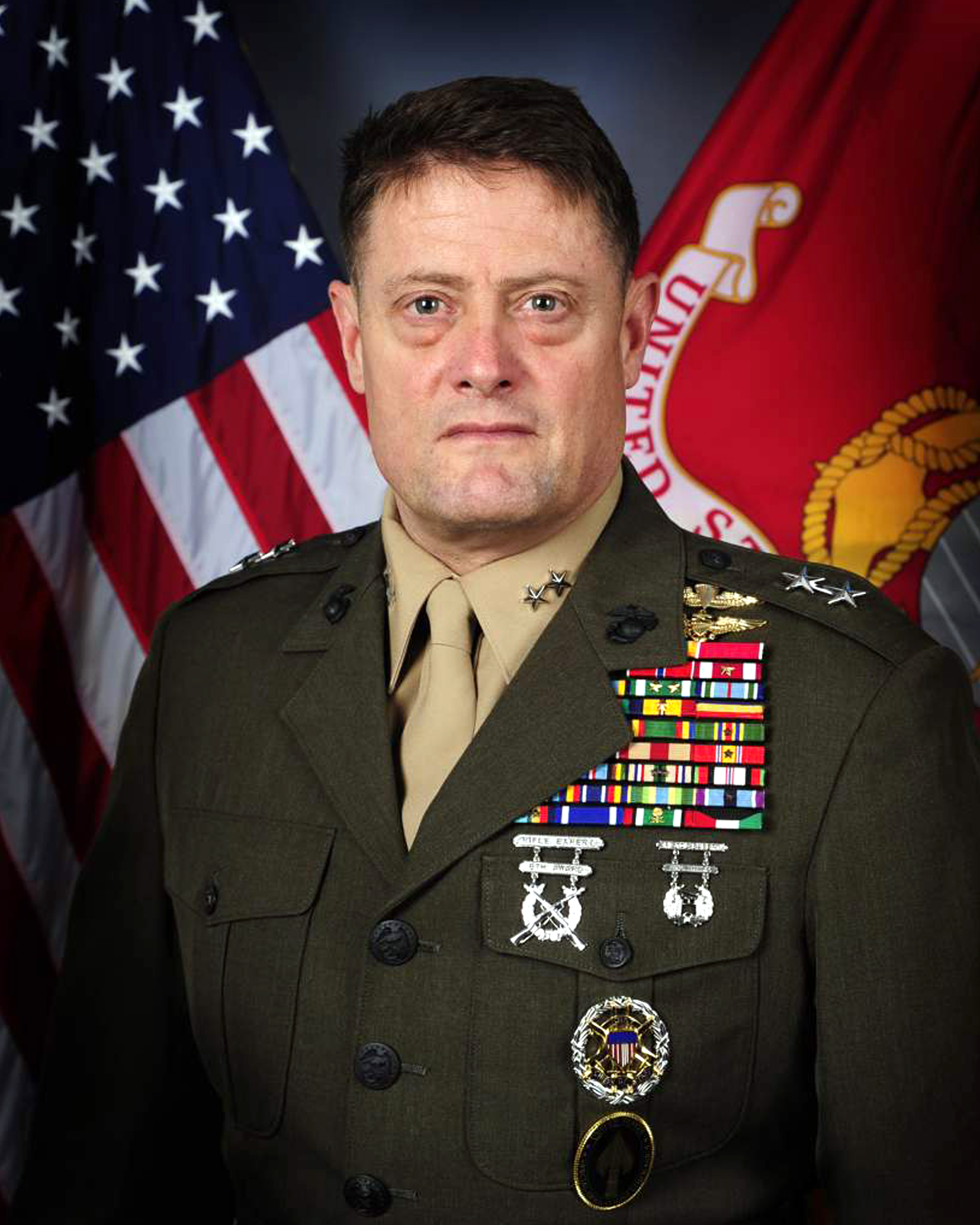
- Education: South Dakota State University
- Military career
- Allegiance: United States
- Branch: United States Marine Corps
- Service years: 1981–2014
- Rank: Major General
- Nickname: "Droopy"
- Commands: Marine Corps Forces Special Operations Command
- Conflicts: Gulf War; Operation Deliberate Force; War in Afghanistan; Iraq War
- Awards: Defense Superior Service Medal; Legion of Merit; Bronze Star Medal

Mark A. "Droopy" Clark is a retired United States Marine Corps major general. Clark was the fourth commander of Marine Corps Forces Special Operations Command (MARSOC). He retired from the Marine Corps in 2014 upon relinquishing command of MARSOC.

== Early life ==
Clark is a native of Sioux Falls and was raised in South Dakota and Minnesota. He graduated from South Dakota State University with a Bachelor of Science degree in Commercial Economics in 1980. According to a Q&A interview with the SDSU alumni association while Clark was serving as the Chief of Staff of Special Operations Command, he said his most memorable moment while attending SDSU was "without a doubt, Hobo Day."

== Military career ==
Upon completion of Officer Candidate School in June 1981, Clark was commissioned as a second lieutenant in the United States Marine Corps. Afterwards, he attended Flight School and was designated a Naval Aviator in May 1983. He was assigned to fly the CH-53 Super Stallion after additional training at Marine Corps Air Station New River, North Carolina. He participated in both Operation Desert Storm and Operation Desert Shield. His first involvement with Special Operations came as a result of a pilot exchange program with the United States Air Force, where Clark was assigned to the 20th Special Operations Squadron operating the MH-53J Pave Low. While at the 20th SOS, Clark was deployed in support of Operation Deliberate Force during the Bosnian War. From 2001 to 2002, Clark served as Operations Officer in Task Force K-Bar during the early years of Operation Enduring Freedom.

Clark attended the United States Army War College from 2002 to 2003. While a student there, he wrote a 67-page Strategy Research Project titled "Should the Marine Corps expand its role in special operations." He was the Director of Operations at United States Special Operations Command from 2009 to 2011. In January 2011, Secretary of Defense Robert Gates announced that Clark was nominated for promotion to major general. In May 2011, he replaced Joseph Votel as SOCOM's chief of staff as Votel went off to assume command of Joint Special Operations Command from Admiral William H. McRaven. Clark served as SOCOM's chief of staff until August 2012 when he assumed command of Marine Corps Forces Special Operations Command from Major General Paul E. Lefebvre. He was the first MARSOC commander to have served previously at SOCOM.

== Awards and badges ==
Naval Aviator insignia

Defense Superior Service Medal
Legion of Merit
Bronze Star Medal
Meritorious Service Medal with one gold star
Aerial Achievement Medal
Navy and Marine Corps Commendation Medalwith two gold star
Joint Service Achievement Medal
Navy and Marine Corps Achievement Medal
Combat Action Ribbon with one gold star
Navy Presidential Unit Citation
Joint Meritorious Unit Award
Navy Unit Commendation
Navy Meritorious Unit Commendationwith one bronze star
Air Force Outstanding Unit Award
Marine Corps Expeditionary Medal
National Defense Service Medal with one bronze star
Armed Forces Expeditionary Medal
Southwest Asia Service Medal with three bronze star
Afghanistan Campaign Medal
Global War on Terrorism Expeditionary Medal
Global War on Terrorism Service Medal
Armed Forces Service Medal
Humanitarian Service Medal with one bronze star
Navy Sea Service Deployment Ribbon with one bronze star
NATO Medal
Kuwait Liberation Medal (Saudi Arabia)
Kuwait Liberation Medal (Kuwait)

Office of the Joint Chiefs of Staff Identification Badge
United States Special Operations Command Badge

Military offices
Preceded by Paul E. Lefebvre	Commanding General of the United States Marine Forces Special Operations Command; 2012–2014	Succeeded by Joseph Osterman
