= URG-I =

U.S. special operations M4A1 upper receiver upgrade

Upper Receiver Group Improved
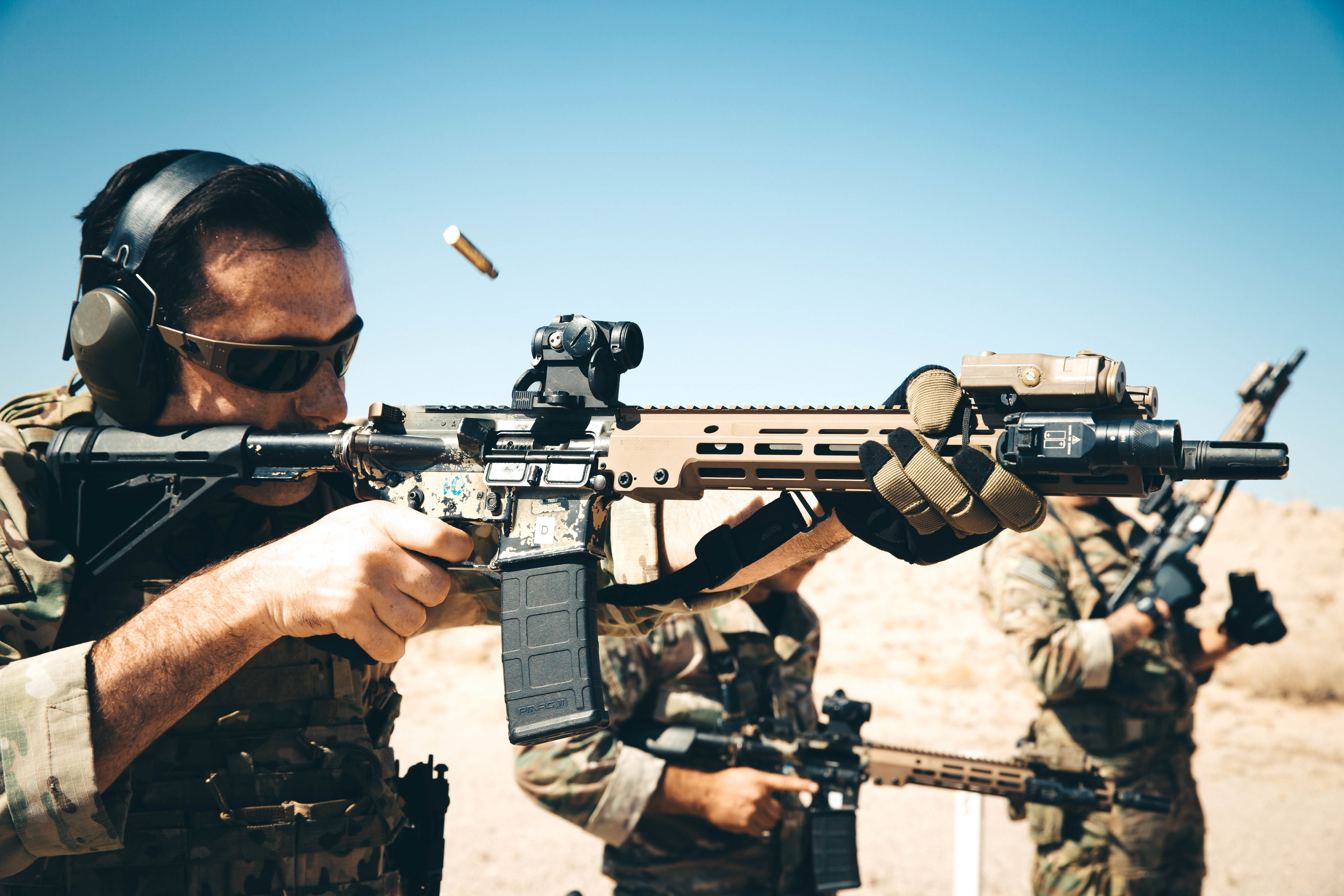
- The URG-I used by a Green Beret from 3rd SFG (A), with a black Magpul PMAG, during training at Marine Corps Air Ground Combat Center, Twentynine Palms, California in 2019
- Type: Rifle upper receiver assembly
- Place of origin: United States

Service history
- In service: 2018–present
- Used by: See Users

Production history
- Designer: Geissele Automatics
- Manufacturer: Geissele Automatics
- Variants: 14.5 in, 11.5 in and 10.3 in barrel configurations

Specifications
- Cartridge: 5.56×45mm NATO (optimized for M855A1)
- Barrels: 14.5 in (368 mm), 13.9 in (353 mm) or 11.5 in (292 mm)
- Action: Gas-operated (direct impingement), rotating bolt; mid-length gas system (14.5 in variant)
- Feed system: STANAG magazine

The Upper Receiver Group - Improved (URG-I), also styled URGI, is an upgraded upper receiver assembly for the M4A1 carbine adopted by United States Army Special Operations Command (USASOC). First fielded in 2018, it replaces the upper receiver, barrel and handguard of the SOPMOD Block II M4A1 with lighter, longer-lived components while retaining the existing M4A1 lower receiver. Because only the upper assembly is changed, rifles fitted with the URG-I retain the M4A1 designation.

The kit's principal features are a Daniel Defense cold hammer-forged barrel that returns to the lighter "government" profile, a mid-length gas system, and a lightweight Geissele Automatics free-floating handguard using the M-LOK mounting standard. The package was optimized for the U.S. military's M855A1 Enhanced Performance Round.

== Development ==
The URG-I originated as a USASOC effort to upgrade the M4A1 carbines used by its subordinate units, which were already equipped with M4A1s using the SOPMOD Block II accessory package. Geissele Automatics and Daniel Defense collaborated on the upper receiver groups, which were initially ordered for the 75th Ranger Regiment and the U.S. Army Special Forces groups. Geissele subsequently marketed a civilian "near-clone" of the assembly, which differs from the issued item chiefly in that its muzzle device is pinned and welded to meet the 16-inch (406 mm) minimum barrel length required of non-NFA rifles.

Although informally referred to by some as "Block III", because the modification affects only the upper receiver, URG-I–equipped rifles remain Block II weapons.

== Design ==
=== Barrel and gas system ===
The URG-I uses a cold hammer-forged, chrome-lined barrel with a 1:7 rifling twist, supplied by Daniel Defense. In contrast to the heavier SOCOM profile barrel found on Block II rifles, the URG-I returns to the lighter "government" profile. The standard 14.5-inch (368 mm) configuration pairs this barrel with a mid-length gas system in place of the carbine-length system used on the M4A1 which lowers bolt carrier velocity and reduces felt recoil and parts wear, increasing reliability and extending the service life of the weapon. The barrel is fitted with a SureFire four-prong flash hider that doubles as a mount for SureFire's SOCOM-series sound suppressors.

=== Handguard and furniture ===
The defining external feature of the URG-I is the Geissele Super Modular Rail (SMR) Mk16, a slim free-floating handguard that incorporates the M-LOK accessory-mounting standard in place of the quad-rail Picatinny handguard of earlier configurations. The assembly also includes a Geissele ambidextrous charging handle and a low-profile gas block. For the contract-issued configuration the upper receiver and bolt carrier group are built to military specification by Colt.

== Variants ==
- 14.5-inch (368 mm) - Standard-issue configuration, with a mid-length gas system and a 13.5-inch (343 mm) Mk16 rail
- 13.9-inch (353 mm) - A shorter civilian configuration, with a mid-length gas system and a 13.5-inch (343 mm) Mk16 rail. Not in military service
- 10.3-inch (262 mm) - A close-quarters configuration with a 10.3-inch (262 mm) Mk16 rail

== Users ==
- United States
  - United States Army Special Operations Command
    - 75th Ranger Regiment
    - U.S. Army Special Forces
  - Air Force Special Operations Command

== Successor ==
In May 2026, Naval Surface Warfare Center Crane released a solicitation for the Hypervelocity Improved Capability Assault Rifle (HICAR), an effort to replace or upgrade the URG-I with a system able to fire both standard 5.56×45mm NATO and an emerging high-pressure "hypervelocity" cartridge, with the stated goal of extending effective range from 300 to 600 meters.

== See also ==
- Close Quarters Battle Receiver
- Mk 12 Special Purpose Rifle
