= Critical skills operator =

- CSO providing security in Helmand province during the War in Afghanistan
- Active: October 1, 2011 - Present
- Country: United States of America
- Branch: United States Marine Corps
- Type: Special Operations Force
- Size: ~1,000
- Part of: United States Special Operations Command; Marine Corps Forces Special Operations Command
- Nickname: Raiders

A critical skills operator (CSO) is a United States Marine in the primary special operations career field of the United States Marine Forces Special Operations Command (MARSOC). CSOs, colloquially known as "Raiders", are awarded the Military Occupational Specialty 0372. CSOs are assigned to Marine Special Operations Teams (MSOT), Companies (MSOC) and Battalions (MSOBs). CSOs are trained to execute a variety of missions. Specialized training also provides capabilities in language fluency necessary for crossing cultural barriers, allowing CSOs to connect with local forces and civilians. It takes, at a minimum, four and a half years to create a Marine CSO; a Marine must have served a minimum of three years or achieved the rank of at least lance corporal before being considered a MARSOC candidate.

The 0372 MOS was created on October 1, 2011. MARSOC's initial requirement for manning was 850 CSOs to outfit 48 fully operational Marine Special Operations Teams.

== Background ==
After the successful Det One program, the Marine Corps authorized the creation of a Marine Corps contingent at the United States Special Operations Command. The new command, United States Marine Forces Special Operations Command (MARSOC), drew substantial numbers from the Marine Corps Recon community at the battalion level and from Force Reconnaissance Companies. Initially, the career path of these Marines was similar to that of the existing Recon community; Marines were assigned to MARSOC for a period of five years, after which they would be rotated to a new unit. The creation of the 0372 MOS was a response to the desire of MARSOC Marines to remain at MARSOC with an MOS that would allow them a special operations-dedicated career path.

== MARSOC CSO creed ==
My title is Marine, but it is my choice and my choice alone to be a Special Operations Marine. I will never forget the tremendous sacrifice and reputation of those who came before me.

At all ranges, my fire will be accurate. With surprise, speed and violence of action, I will hunt enemies of my country and bring chaos to their doorstep. I will keep my body strong, my mind sharp and my kit ready at all times.

Raider and Recon men forged the path I follow. With determination, dependability and teamwork, I will uphold the honor and the legacy passed down to me. I will do the right thing always and will let my actions speak for me. As a quiet professional, I will not bring shame upon myself or those with whom I serve.

Spiritus Invictus, an unconquerable spirit, will be my goal. I will never quit, I will never surrender, I will never fail. I will adapt to the situation. I will gain and maintain the initiative. I will always go a little farther and carry more than my share.

On any battlefield, at any point of the compass, I will excel. I will set the example for all others to emulate. At the tip of the spear, I will teach and prepare others to seek out, dismantle and destroy our common enemies. I will fight side by side with my partners and will be the first in and last out of any mission.

Conquering all obstacles of mind, body and spirit, the honor and pride of serving in Special Operations will be my driving force. I will remain always faithful to my brothers and always forward in my service.

== CSO selection and training ==
=== Screening ===
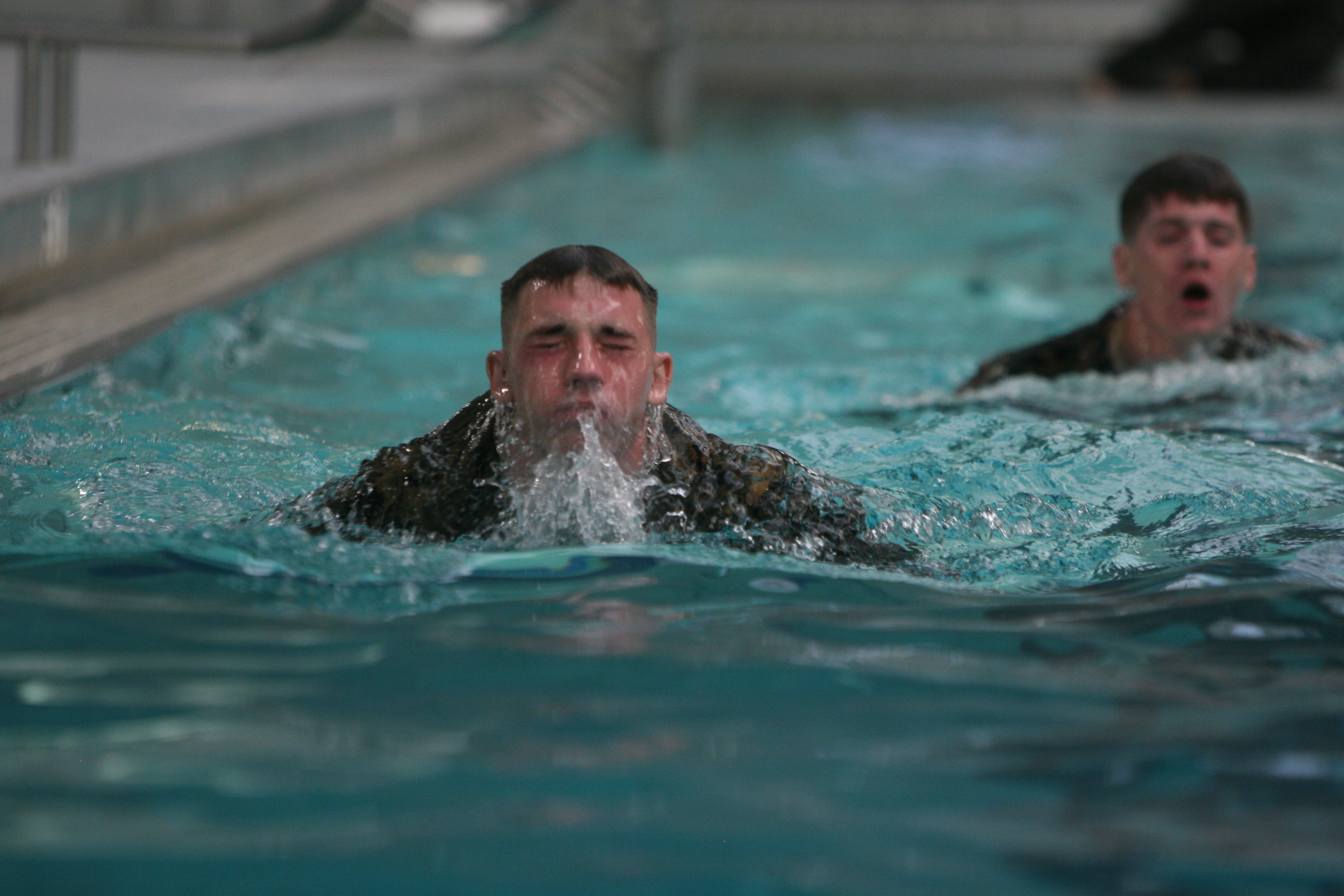
CSO candidates in the A&S Preparation and Orientation Course conducting a 300m swim in preparation for A&S.

Selection of personnel begins with a screening process designed to identify Marines for the right billet within MARSOC. Operational billets are open to males and females. Only those Marines wanting to serve as CSOs, as opposed to support, must attend Assessment and Selection (A&S); however, all Marines are screened to ensure that those joining MARSOC meet established prerequisites for duty within the command. Screening takes place in three stages: record screening, physical screening and a psychological and medical evaluation. Prior to A&S, candidates go through the Assessment and Selection Preparation and Orientation Course (ASPOC).

=== Assessment and selection ===
Once a Marine is qualified through the MARSOC recruiter's screening process, they will be assigned to the Assessment and Selection (A&S) Program.

==== Phase 1 ====
The three-week A&S Phase 1 is the first phase of selection. This phase is used mostly to determine physical fitness to serve as a Marine Raider and includes running, swimming and ruck marches. The course also incorporates classroom instruction and practical application of basic Marine Corps knowledge and MARSOC and Special Operations Forces fundamentals. Phase 1 completion does not guarantee selection.

==== Phase 2 ====
A&S is an evaluation that enables MARSOC to identify attributes compatible with Special Operations missions and the MARSOC way of life.

=== Individual Training Course ===
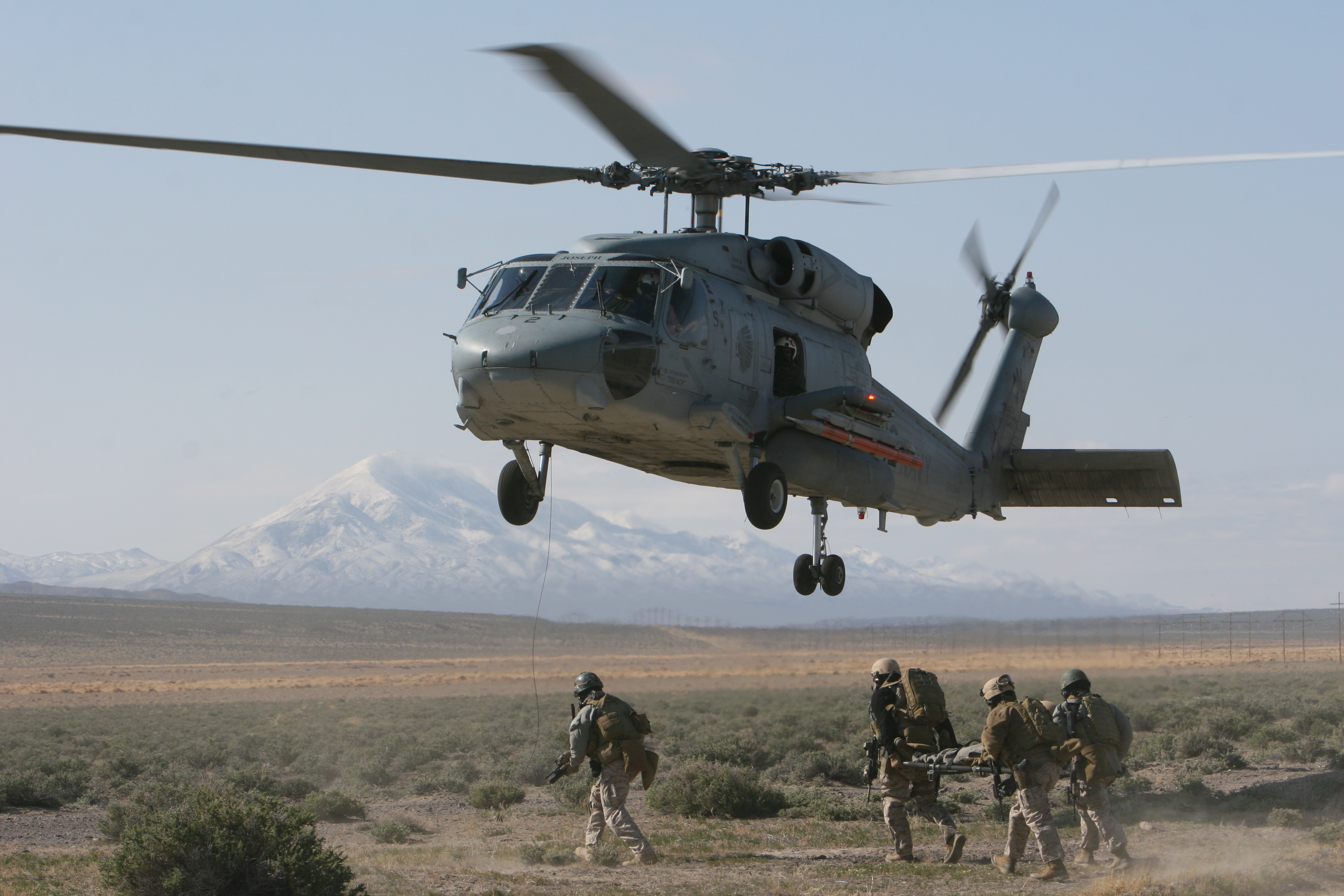
An SH-60 Seahawk waits for a simulated Medical evacuation.

Marines selected for assignment as CSO attend the Individual Training Course (ITC), a ten-month program that builds multidimensional operators capable of working across the full spectrum of special operations and aware of the strategic context in which they operate. The ITC is equivalent to the Army's Special Forces Qualification Course and Navy's SEAL Qualification Training (SQT). ITC uses a building block approach in which the training rigor is systematically increased to mimic the complexity and stresses of combat. During ITC, students are under constant observation from instructors and their peers. ITC is broken down into four training phases:

==== Phase 1 ====
Phase 1 trains and evaluates students in the basic skill sets required of all special operators. Physical fitness, swimming and hand-to-hand combat are stressed in a PT program designed around endurance, functional fitness and amphibious training. This program continues throughout the course and was designed to prepare students for the unique demands of Special Operations. Field skills including navigation, patrolling, Survival, Evasion, Resistance and Escape (SERE), Tactical Combat Casualty Care (TCCC), mission planning, fire support training and communications round out Phase 1.

==== Phase 2 ====
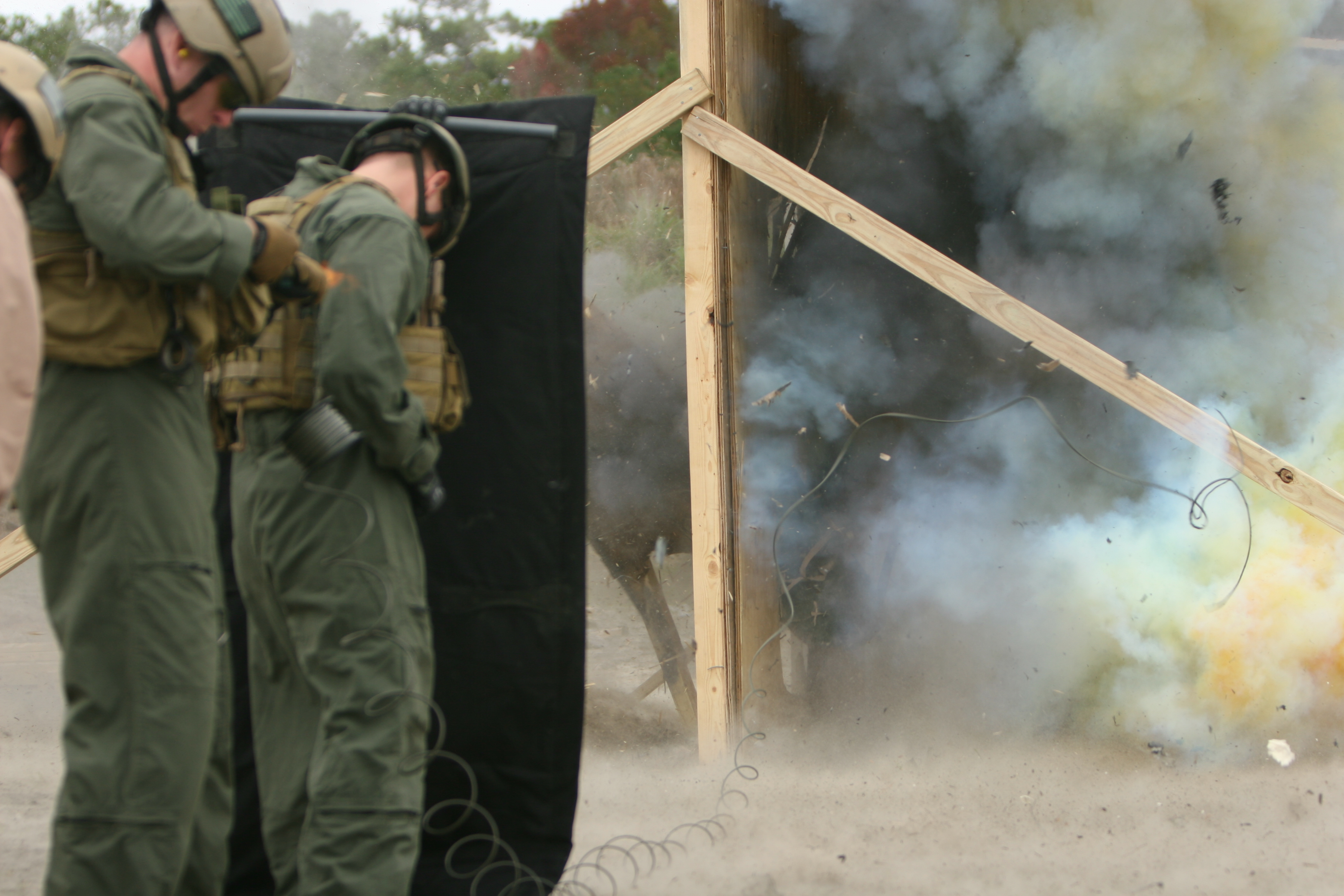
CSOs conducting breaching training.

Phase 2 builds upon the foundation of Phase 1, training students in small boat and scout swimmer operations, small arms, medium/ heavy machine guns, rocket battle drills, 60mm/81mm mortar employment, demolitions, live fire and maneuver, photography and information collection and reporting. Students are evaluated in two full mission profile exercises: “Operation Raider Spirit”, a grueling two-week exercise focused on patrolling and combat operations while under constant stress from instructor cadre and sleep deprivation; and “Operation Stingray Fury”, focused on urban and rural reconnaissance.

==== Phase 3 ====
In Phase 3, students are trained in rifle and pistol combat marksmanship, mechanical, explosive breaching, and learn tactics, techniques, and procedures needed during unilateral assault operations. This phase culminates in student planned and executed full mission profile precision raids on rural and urban objectives during “Operation Guile Strike”.

==== Phase 4 ====
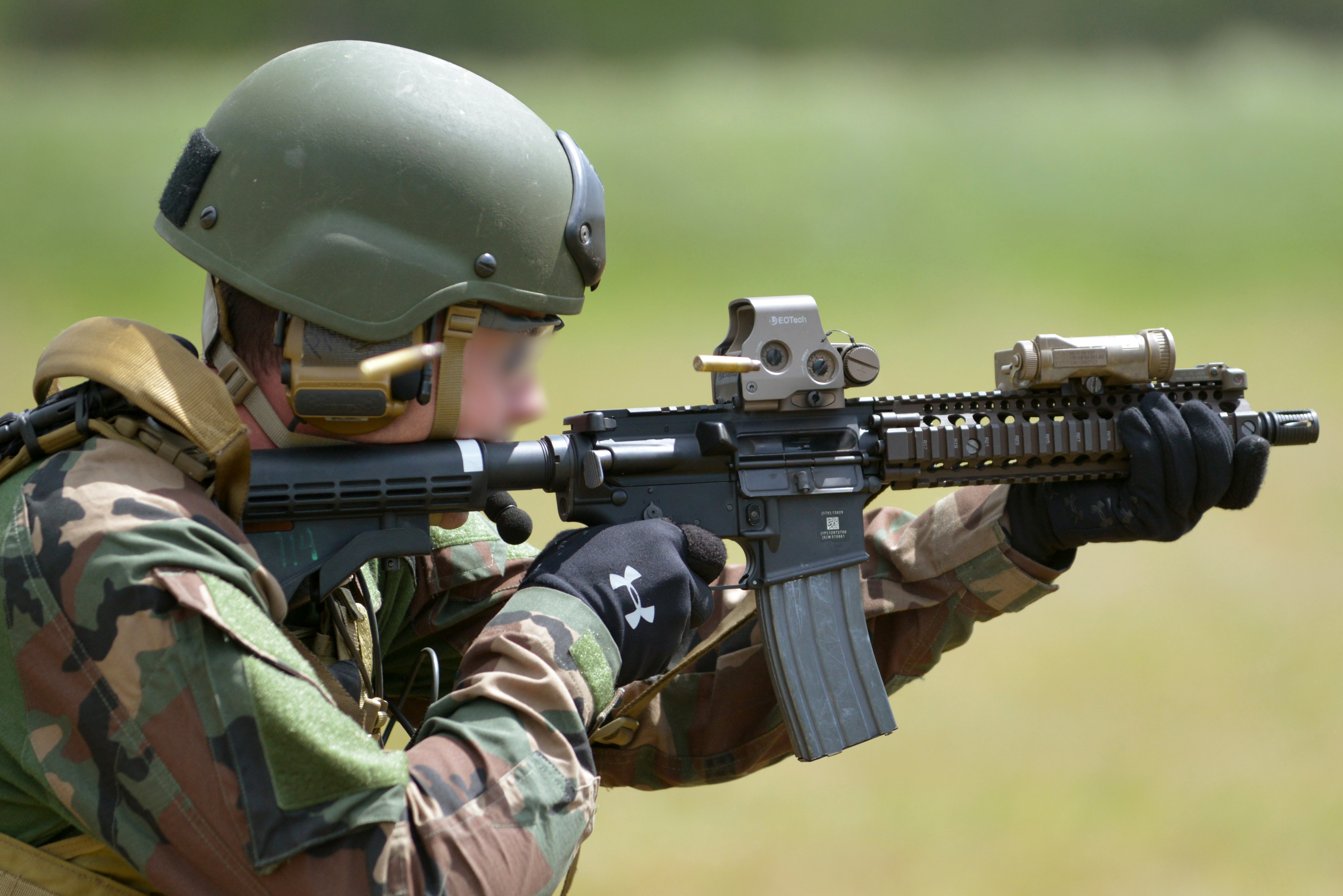
A CSO operator wearing the Modular Integrated Communications Helmet practices firing his modified CQBR at the Grafenwoehr Training Area's shooting range.

In the final phase, students receive instruction on irregular warfare operations. The course culminates with “Operation Derna Bridge”, which requires students to use all skills mastered throughout the course while training, advising and operating with a partner nation/irregular force. Newly graduated Marine special operators are awarded the 0372 MOS and Marine Raider designation before being assigned to one of the three Marine Special Operations battalions.

=== Language training ===
All CSOs are required to undergo continual language training. Based on ability, some Marines are selected for follow-on language training at an advanced linguistics course. Those selected for language training could face 36 to 52 weeks of school depending on aptitude, the needs of his unit and the deployment cycle stage of his team.

=== Advanced training ===
The training of CSOs continues at assigned battalions for another 18 months. CSOs may qualify for advanced training and certifications in areas such as foreign language and emergency medical care based on future assignments. CSOs also attend the United States Army Airborne School and the United States Marine Corps Combatant Diver Course. The MSOS also offers advanced-level courses in a number of subject areas: special reconnaissance, close-quarters battle, sniper, breaching and weapons employment.

== Weapons and gear ==
When Det One, the pilot program for MARSOC, was officially activated in 2003, there were concerns that Marines would not have the specific weapons, body armor, optics and other personal protective equipment required for their tasks. Much of the SOCOM gear was beyond the standard USMC equipment issue and was mission essential. The same or closely similar state-of-the-art equipment would be necessary to enable any future detachment to be interoperable and sufficiently able to conduct special operations with other SOCOM units.
