= Peter D. Huntley =

U.S. Marine Corps general

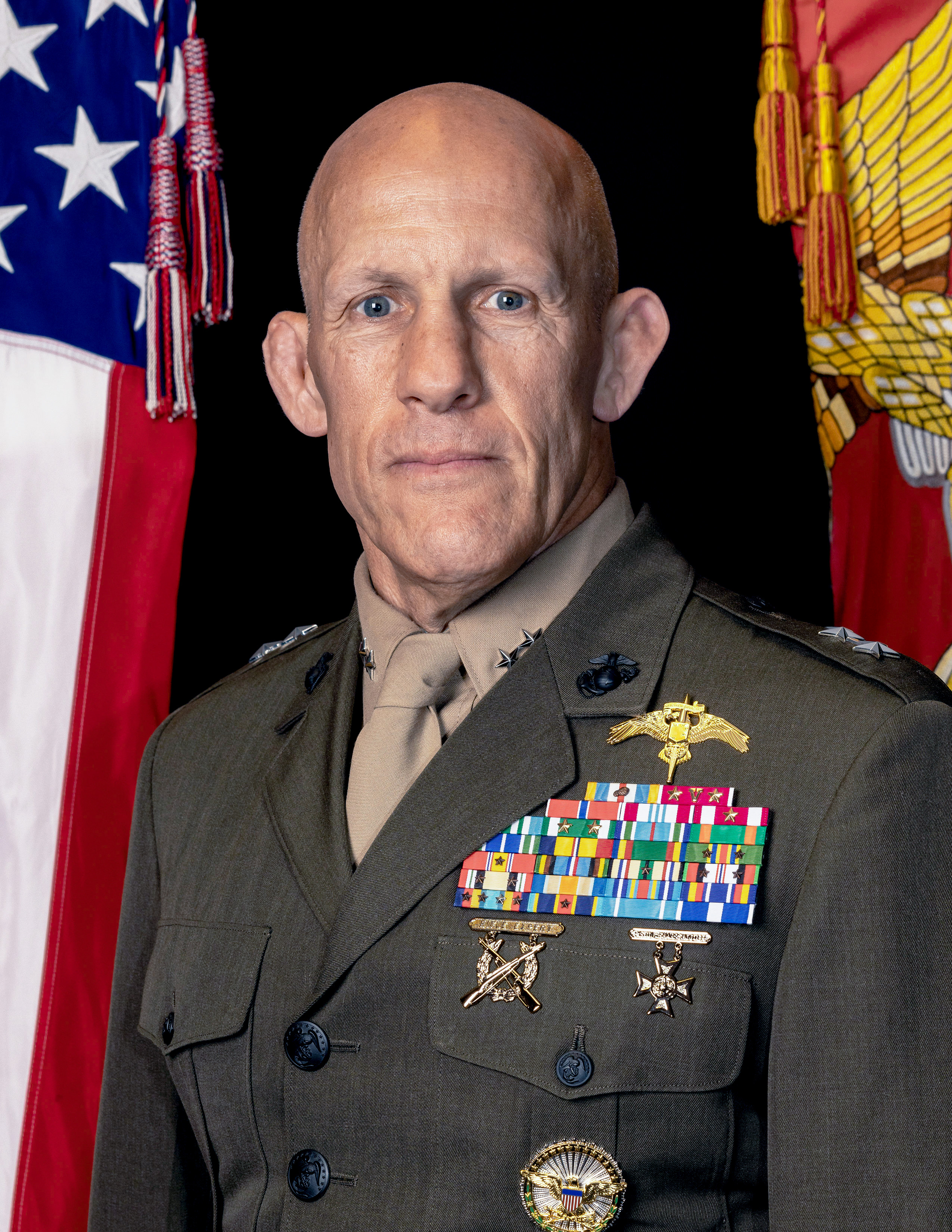
- Official portrait, 2024
- Military career
- Allegiance: United States
- Branch: United States Army; United States Marine Corps
- Service years: 1984–1987(USA); 1991–present(USMC)
- Rank: Major General
- Commands: United States Marine Forces Special Operations Command
- Conflicts: War in Afghanistan; Iraq War
- Awards: Defense Superior Service Medal; Legion of Merit (2); Bronze Star Medal

Peter D. Huntley (born c. 1966) is a United States Marine Corps major general who currently serves as the commander of Marine Forces Special Operations Command (MARSOC) since June 11, 2024.

== Military career ==
Huntley enlisted in the U.S. Army in 1984 and served with the 1st Ranger Battalion until his honorable discharge in 1987. He later commissioned into the U.S. Marine Corps through the Platoon Leader’s Course in December 1991. He completed the Infantry Officer Course in 1992.

Huntley has served in numerous operational assignments, including deployments to Somalia during Operation UNOSOM II and to Afghanistan supporting U.S. Embassy operations. He commanded Task Force Kabul in 2002 and served as a battalion executive officer during a deployment to eastern Afghanistan in 2004.

== Awards and decorations ==
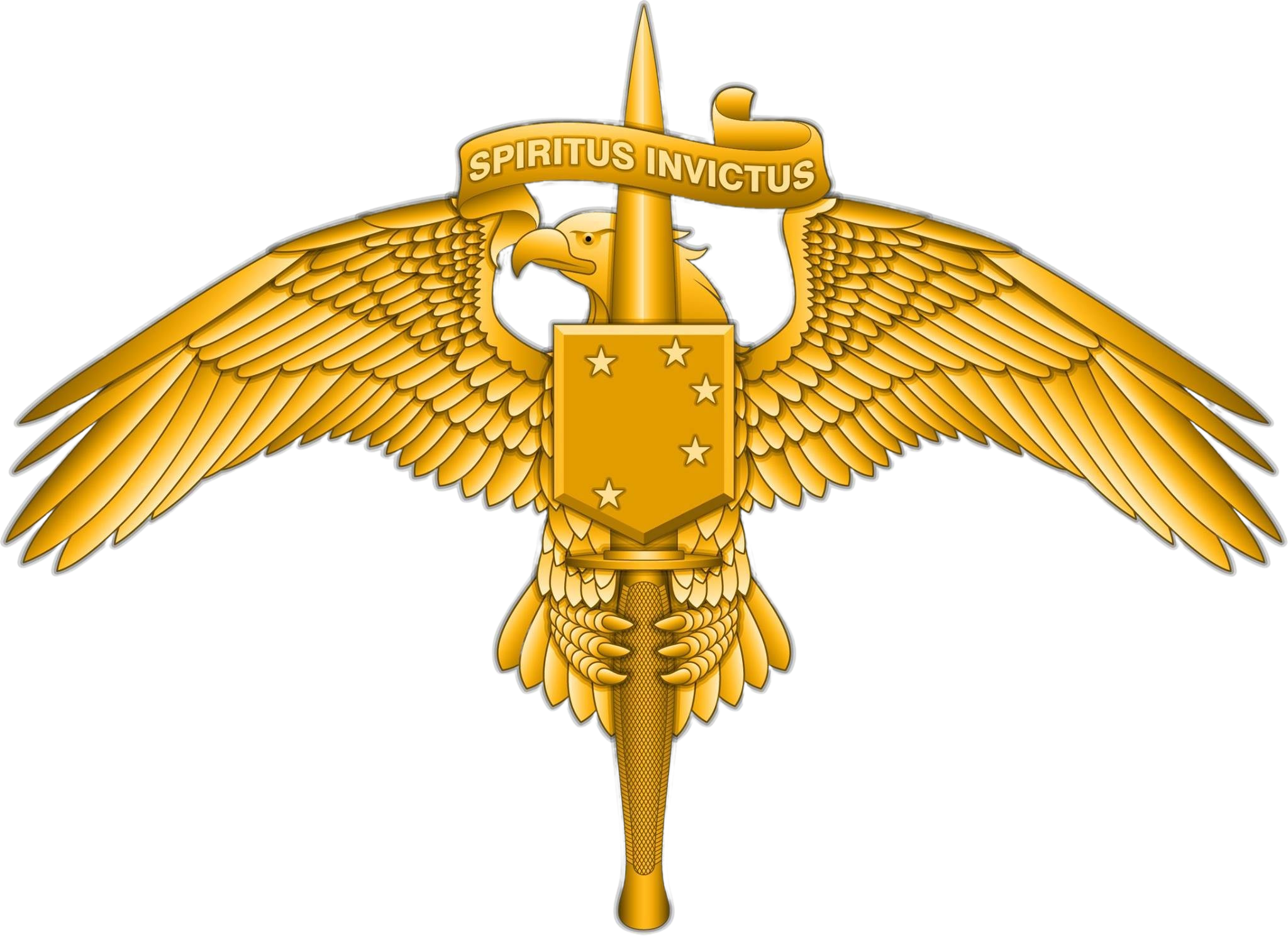

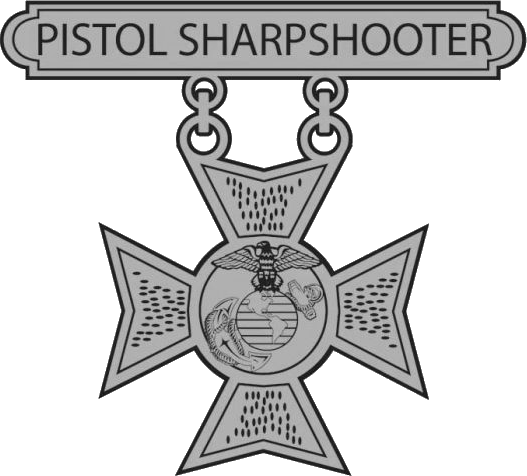

MARSOCInsignia
Defense Superior Service Medal with oak leaf cluster
Legion of Merit with Combat V and with two gold stars	Bronze Star Medal	Defense Meritorious Service Medal	Meritorious Service Medal with one gold star
Joint Service Commendation Medal	Navy and Marine Corps Commendation Medal with two gold award stars	Joint Service Achievement Medal	Navy and Marine Corps Achievement Medal
Army Achievement Medal	Combat Action Ribbon	U.S. Navy Unit Commendation	Navy Meritorious Unit Commendation with two service stars
National Defense Service Medal with service star	Armed Forces Expeditionary Medal	Southwest Asia Service Medal with service star	Afghanistan Campaign Medal with two service stars
Iraq Campaign Medal with two service stars	Inherent Resolve Campaign Medal	Global War on Terrorism Expeditionary Medal	Global War on Terrorism Service Medal
Navy and Marine Corps Sea Service Deployment with eight service stars	Navy and Marine Corps Overseas Service Ribbon with service star	United Nations Medal	NATO Medal for Kosovo
Expert Rifle Badge		Sharpsshooter Pistol Badge	

== Personal life ==
Huntley is married to Krista Huntley. They have three children.

Military offices
Preceded by Matthew Trollinger	Commander of the United States Marine Forces Special Operations Command; 2024–Present	Incumbent
