= Paul E. Lefebvre =

United States Marine Corps general

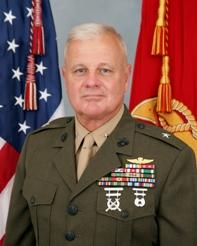
- Brigadier General Paul E. Lefebvre in 2009
- Military career
- Allegiance: United States
- Branch: United States Marine Corps
- Service years: 1977–2012
- Rank: Major General
- Commands: United States Marine Corps Forces Special Operations Command; Marine Corps Recruit Depot Parris Island; 22nd Marine Expeditionary Unit; 3rd Battalion 8th Marines
- Conflicts: Operation Uphold Democracy; Operation Just Cause; War in Afghanistan; Iraq War
- Awards: Defense Superior Service Medal; Legion of Merit (3); Bronze Star Medal

Paul E. Lefebvre is a retired United States Marine Corps major general who served as the third Commanding General of the Marine Corps Forces Special Operations Command.

== Early life and education ==
Lefebvre graduated from Springfield College in 1975 with a Bachelor of Science in Physical Education. Prior to entering the Marine Corps, he coached football at Pennsylvania State University under the tutelage of Joe Paterno.

Lefebvre is an honor graduate of Officer Candidate School, The Basic School and Amphibious Warfare School and a distinguished graduate of Marine Command and Staff College and the Marine Corps War College.

== Military career ==
In April 1977, Lefebvre was commissioned a second lieutenant after graduating from Officer Candidate School. Before assignment to the Fleet Marine Force, he graduated from The Basic School and Infantry Officers Course. Initially assigned to 1st Battalion, 3rd Marines, he commanded a rifle platoon, weapons platoon, and a 81mm mortar platoon.

In 1981, Lefebvre served as a Guard Company commander of the Marine Barracks at Naval Weapons Station Earle. In 1985, Lefebvre was assigned to the 2nd Battalion 9th Marines, where he commanded the Headquarters & Support Company and the Weapons Company, as well as operations officer. He served as an instructor at the Amphibious Warfare School from 1988 until 1992, when he transferred to the Joint Special Operations Command at Fort Bragg serving as current operations officer. In 1995, he served as the executive officer of the 8th Marine Regiment, then assumed command of 3rd Battalion 8th Marines.

After a short period as the executive officer of the 2nd Marine Regiment in 1998, Lefebvre transferred to Headquarters Marine Corps to direct the Strategic Initiatives Group and the Commandant's "War Room". He assumed command of the 22nd Marine Expeditionary Unit in 2000, and in the wake of the September 11 attacks, led the unit into Afghanistan.

In 2003, Lefebvre directed the Marine Air-Ground Task Force Staff Training Program at Marine Corps Combat Development Command until 2004, when served as the Deputy Director of Operations at United States Pacific Command until 2006. He then commanded Marine Corps Recruit Depot Parris Island and Eastern Recruiting Region for two years. In 2008, he became the Deputy Commanding General of Multi-National Corps Iraq, and then briefly the Deputy Commanding General of II Marine Expeditionary Force in 2009.

In November 2009, Major General Mastin M. Robeson turned over command of United States Marine Corps Forces Special Operations Command to Lefebvre. He was retired from the Marine Corps in 2012. He also served on the board of governors for the Marine Corps Association and the editorial board for the Marine Corps Gazette. He is an honorary chairman of The OSS Society.

== Awards and honors ==
Lefebvre's awards include:

Navy and Marine Corps Parachutist Insignia
1st Row		Defense Superior Service Medal	Legion of Merit w/ 2 award stars	
2nd Row	Bronze Star Medal	Defense Meritorious Service Medal	Meritorious Service Medal w/ 1 award star	Navy and Marine Corps Commendation Medal
3rd Row	Navy and Marine Corps Achievement Medal w/ 1 award star	Joint Meritorious Unit Award w/ 2 oak leaf clusters	Navy Unit Commendation	National Defense Service Medal w/ 1 service star
4th Row	Armed Forces Expeditionary Medal	Afghanistan Campaign Medal w/ 1 service star	Iraq Campaign Medal w/ 1 service star	Global War on Terrorism Expeditionary Medal
5th Row	Global War on Terrorism Service Medal	Korea Defense Service Medal	Humanitarian Service Medal	Navy Sea Service Deployment Ribbonw/ 5 service stars

In 1987, while serving with 2nd Battalion 9th Marines, Lefebvre was awarded the Leftwich Trophy.

Military offices
Preceded by Mastin M. Robeson	Commanding General of the United States Marine Forces Special Operations Command; 2009–2012	Succeeded by Mark A. Clark
