= 2007 Shinwar shooting =

Alleged killing of a number of Afghan civilians

The Shinwar Shooting or Shinwar Massacre was the killing of a number of Afghan civilians on 4 March 2007, in the village of Spinpul, in the Shinwar District of the Nangarhar Province of Afghanistan. United States Marines, fleeing the scene of a car bomb attack and ambush by Afghan militants, fired on people and vehicles surrounding them, according to initial reports, killing as many as 19 civilians and injuring around 50 more. A later U.S. Navy investigation found that between 5 and 7 adult men were killed, and 2 civilians, a 16-year-old boy and a woman, were injured. However, the exact figures remain unknown, as U.S. Military Police did not find any dead or wounded civilians when they arrived 30 minutes after the shooting.

The United States Marine Corps began an internal inquiry in January 2008. In May, "no criminal charges were brought against any officer, although some did receive an "administrative reprimand." All involved troops were subsequently issued Combat Action Ribbons, and one gunner was issued a Purple Heart. The report was condemned by the Afghan Independent Human Rights Commission and by the United Nations mission in Afghanistan. Further revelations in 2010 led employees of Amnesty International and the International Bar Association to assert that there was prima facie, or superficial evidence that international humanitarian law had been violated, but could not speculate further without knowing the details of the inquiry.

In 2019 the Board for Correction of Naval Records recommended the platoon's Marine commander be retroactively promoted to lieutenant colonel with back pay, and the board criticized the 2007 senior commanders who failed to "respond appropriately to an enemy information operation and stand by the troops."

== Sequence of events ==
On 4 March 2007, Haji Ihsanullah, a member of Hezb-i Islami Khalis (or the Tora Bora Military Front, depending on source), drove a minivan laden with explosives into one of the vehicles making up a U.S. military convoy, which included either three or six Humvees. A U.S. Marine was injured. Sources differ on whether hidden gunmen then also opened fire on the convoy. The Marines fled the area, firing on some vehicles for between 6 and 16 miles while driving along the Afghan street.

According to several witnesses and the Afghan Independent Human Rights Commission, the U.S. Marines' response to the car bombing included indiscriminate firing at passing civilians on the busy highway. They asserted that elderly men, women and children were killed. Akhtyar Gul, a local reporter who witnessed the shooting, claimed that the Marines sprayed civilians with machine gun fire even though the Marines were not under attack. According to Associated Press and Afghan journalists, U.S. troops confiscated photos and videos of the incident and its aftermath. A freelance photographer working for the Associated Press claimed that two Marines and a translator asked him: "Why are you taking pictures? You don't have permission." Another photographer claimed that he had been told by U.S. troops through an interpreter: "Delete them [your photos], or we will delete you."

== Afghan response ==
The killings were followed by widespread protests across Afghanistan and drew sharp criticism from President Hamid Karzai. The Afghan Independent Human Rights Commission's report asserted that: "In failing to distinguish between civilians and legitimate military targets, the U.S. Marine Corps Special Operators employed indiscriminate force. Their actions thus constitute a serious violation of international humanitarian standards."

== Aftermath ==
Major General Frank Kearney, head of the U.S. Special Operations Command (USSOCOM), ordered the entire 120-member unit out of Afghanistan pending an investigation into the incident and announced that there was no evidence supporting the Marines' story that they had come under fire. The unit's commander and senior officer were relieved of their duties on 3 April 2007 and reassigned to Camp Lejeune in North Carolina. Kearney's order to have the unit depart Afghanistan was later found by the Department of Defense's Inspector General to be within his authority and reasonable. Compensation payments of $2,000 each were paid to the families of those killed or wounded; overall more than fifty Afghans received compensation payments.

== Investigation and inquiry ==
The shooting came under investigation by both Afghanistan and the United States. On 12 April 2007, an initial investigation headed by a United States Air Force colonel was conducted, endorsed by a United States Army general. It determined that the Marines used "excessive force when they killed civilians after a suicide bombing" and referred the case to the Naval Criminal Investigative Service for a criminal inquiry; the investigation occurred two months after the shootings, with investigators only able to study the site of the shooting for an hour. The New York Times of 20 April 2007 included an article asserting that the shooting was similar to the Haditha massacre.

The Pentagon issued a formal apology for the incident on 7 May 2007. "This was a terrible, terrible mistake," said U.S. Army Colonel John Nicholson, "and my nation grieves with you for your loss and suffering. We humbly and respectfully ask for your forgiveness." Nicholson commanded Task Force Spartan, whose area of operation as defined by ISAF Regional Command East included the area of the shooting. This was dismissed as premature by General James T. Conway, Commandant of the Marine Corps, who said: "I would just as soon that no one ... apologize or talk about 'terrible, terrible mistakes'."

James Mattis, then a Marine Corps lieutenant general, ordered a court of inquiry to be held. The court at Camp Lejeune, North Carolina, formally investigated the incident in January 2008, hearing from more than 50 witnesses, including Afghans, over 17 days. Much of the testimony was characterized as "vague and contradictory". The four Marines who had fired their weapons did not testify—according to Declan Walsh, writing in The Guardian of London, "because they had not been granted immunity from prosecution".

During the court of inquiry, Colonel Nicholson stated the Marines did not coordinate their operations with his command when conducting operations and that the Marines' failure to remain at the scene of the attack amounted to failing to "preserve evidence", according to David Zucchino of the Los Angeles Times. Marines who had been present testified that they had been forced to leave the scene by a "complex ambush". One Marine testified that not all Marines in the convoy returned fire against those ambushing the convoy—return fire, he said, was limited to some gunners. This Marine elaborated that the gunners were ordered to cease fire some minutes later by a Marine captain. Testimony by Afghans, including an Afghan police lieutenant colonel, and a 1980s mujahideen commander, contradicted the testimony of the Marines. Nicholson testified that thirty minutes after U.S. Marines left the area, other U.S. troops arrived at the location of the minivan attack and found no dead or wounded Afghans. He speculated that this might be because Afghans collect and bury their dead quickly in line with Islamic tradition, but also acknowledged that Taliban insurgents often fake or exaggerate civilian deaths, stating "That's why it's so important for us to stay on the scene."

According to one of the Marines' defence lawyers, Mark Waple, an investigation by the U.S. Navy estimated that the number of people killed was between five and seven, all adult men; Waple continued that despite the prior claims of massacred women and children, witness statements attested only to a wounded 16-year-old boy and a woman with an injured hand. In May 2008, the court of inquiry concluded that they had "acted appropriately and in accordance with the rules of engagement and tactics, techniques and procedures in place at the time in response to a complex attack."

Testimony to the inquiry was classified and not released, and the 12,000-page report was not published. In March 2015, excerpts of the "key conclusions" were published in the Military Times. No criminal charges were brought, although "some officers" did receive an "administrative reprimand". The court of inquiry recommended judicial and/or administrative actions be taken upon two Marine captains and two enlisted Marines. The verdict infuriated the Afghan Independent Human Rights Commission. Kubra Aman, a member of the Afghan House of Elders from Nangarhar, said "I am very angry. This is too much." The decision was also criticised by the United Nations mission in Afghanistan, whose spokesperson Aleem Siddique said "It is disappointing that no one has been held accountable for these deaths". The two Marine captains were later "cleared of wrongdoing", according to the Marine Corps Times. More than a year after the court of inquiry concluded, Marines involved received Combat Action Ribbons, and an injured turret gunner was awarded the Purple Heart.

In 2010, Mark Ellis of the International Bar Association told Channel 4 News of the UK that based on the Afghan War documents leak, "there is prima facie evidence from the military log that suggests the troops could be investigated for war crimes" but that legal hurdles would probably prevent a hearing before the International Criminal Court. Sam Zafiri of Amnesty International took a similar line, saying that "There is certainly prima facie evidence of violations of international humanitarian law ... It's not so much about whether an investigation into what happened at Jalalabad is re-opened, but rather publish what the U.S. military did investigate, who they talked to, what were the results and how did they arrive at the decision they came to."

In March 2015, the Military Times published a series of articles about the incident, written by Andrew deGrandpre. Fred Galvin, who commanded the Marine unit at the time of the incident, said that despite being cleared by the court of inquiry, he and his men thought that their side of the story had not been properly publicised and that they still felt they were stigmatised as a result of the accusations. Although cleared of wrongdoing, members of the unit were adversely affected by the perception of the event.

=== 2019 Retroactive promotions ===
In January 2019, the Board for Correction of Naval Records reported that Major Fred Galvin (USMC retired) should be promoted to lieutenant colonel and given back pay. The board found "The ambush of 4 March 2007 was not a tactical "misstep". The board found the convoy's response was irreproachable and found no fault relative to the Marines' conduct and performance. The only misstep was the inability or unwillingness of senior U.S. leaders to respond appropriately to an enemy information operation and stand by the troops until competent evidence was gathered."

== See also ==
- Civilian casualties in the war in Afghanistan (2001–present)
- Coalition casualties in Afghanistan
- Command responsibility
- International Security Assistance Force
- Taliban insurgency
- List of massacres in Afghanistan
