= Det One =

Marine Corps Special Operations Command Detachment One
- Marine Corps Special Operations Command Detachment One insignia
- Active: 20 June 2003–2006
- Allegiance: United States of America
- Branch: United States Marine Corps
- Type: Special operations forces
- Role: Direct action, special reconnaissance
- Size: 86
- Part of: US Special Operations Command
- Garrison/HQ: Camp Pendleton, California, US
- Engagements: Operation Iraqi Freedom: Second Battle of Fallujah

Commanders
- Colonel of the Regiment: Robert J. Coates

The Marine Corps Special Operations Command Detachment One, also simply known as Det One, was a pilot marines special operations forces program of attaching a permanent unit of the United States Marine Corps (USMC) to the United States Special Operations Command (USSOCOM). It was commanded by Col. Robert J. Coates, former commanding officer of 1st Force Reconnaissance Company. Det One was activated on 19 June 2003 and had its headquarters at Camp Del Mar Boat Basin in Camp Pendleton, California. It was disbanded in 2006 and succeeded by the permanent United States Marine Corps Forces Special Operations Command (MARSOC).

== Personnel ==
The unit consisted of 81 Marines and 5 Navy Corpsmen divided among 4 sections:

- reconnaissance element (30 men)
- Marine Corps Intelligence element (29 men), containing a headquarters element and

- a Radio Reconnaissance Team (RRT), (9 men)
- a SIGINT support team (3 men)
- a human intelligence (HUMINT) exploitation team (HET), (6 men)
- an all-source fusion team (12 men)

- fires element (7 men)
- headquarters element

The original Marines that formed the detachment were hand-picked from over 500 superior candidates. Despite common misconceptions, Det One was not a beefed-up United States Marine Corps Force Reconnaissance (FORECON) platoon. While the reconnaissance element was composed mostly of 1st Force Reconnaissance Company Marines, they made up only 24 of the 86 members of the detachment. The detachment, though lacking organic aviation, operated under the Marine air–ground task force (MAG-TAF) philosophy of leveraging integrated, complementary capabilities to be more effective than the sum of its parts.

More than half of Det One's Recon Marines were trained United States Marine Corps Scout Sniper (Scout Sniper).

== Insignia ==
Detachment One's Insignia comes from the World War II Marine Raider's patch, a blue patch with a skull and stars. The insignia was created by LtCol (then-GySgt) Anthony Siciliano, USMC. The scarlet, blue, and gold disk represents the unit's joint Navy-Marine Corps origins. The crossed stiletto/lightning bolt represents the unit's special operations mission, and its global communications reach. The parachute wings represent airborne-qualified status and the mask above it represents the combatant diver qualification.

== History ==
In 1986, when the Department of Defense established the new joint United States Special Operations Command, the Marine Corps opted not to participate. Then Commandant Paul X. Kelley expressed the belief popular in the Corps that Marines should support Marines, and that the Corps should not fund a special warfare capability that would operate independently of the Fleet Marine Force. The Corps wanted to retain the Corps' United States Marine Corps Force Reconnaissance units within the Marine air–ground task force command structure and prevent the development of an "elite" within the Marine Corps. Marine Corps leadership believed that such a development would be at the expense of the effectiveness of the Corps as a whole. However, following the 11 September attacks and the current War on terror (a.k.a. Global War on Terrorism (GWOT)), that view began to shift. Defense Secretary Rumsfeld immediately directed the Marine Corps and United States Special Operations Command to work more closely together in what would be called the global war on terror. Marine resistance to special warfare units dissipated when Marine leaders watched the Corps' "crown jewels" – the 15th and 26th Marine Expeditionary Unit (MEU) Maritime Special Purpose Forces (MSPFs) – sit on the sidelines during the early stages of Operation Enduring Freedom while other special warfare units led the way. Resistance from SOF commanders already in-country and indifference from the Navy chain of command left the Marine Expeditionary Unit Special Operations Capables (SOCs) unused for over a month, relegated to supporting roles where SOF lacked manpower.

In October 2002, Commandant James L. Jones, after consultation with USSOCOM leaders, directed the establishment of a Marine unit for permanent USSOCOM employment. Out of this came the T/O for Detachment One, officially activated aboard Camp Pendleton on 19 June 2003.

After completion of Naval Special Warfare (NSW) certification and other training, Det One was deployed to Iraq in March 2004 for Operation Iraqi Freedom. Operating under Naval Special Warfare Group 1 (NSWG 1), Det One executed battle-space operations, clandestine operations, coalition support, controlling ground and air fire support, counterterrorism, direct action, irregular warfare, long-range penetration, and special reconnaissance. A study conducted by the Joint Special Operations University (JSOU) found that

The trial deployment demonstrated the Marine Corps Special Operations Command Detachment One could effectively conduct direct action, irregular warfare, long-range penetration, and special reconnaissance. It is reasonable to suggest that the Detachment could also conduct or support clandestine operations, counterterrorism, foreign internal defense, hostage rescue, and other special operations selected theater security cooperation plans (TSCP), and other tasks as required.

Det One was dubbed as "Task Unit Raider" and deployed alongside US Navy SEALs task units contained within Naval Special Warfare Task Group - Arabian Peninsula, which was part of CJSOTF-AP (Combined Joint Special Operations Task Force-Arabian Peninsula). As the deployment took shape, the operators of the Task Unit Raider and Task Unit Thunder (built around Jednostka Wojskowa GROM) (JW GROM) would become the task force's primary battle-space, clandestine operations, direct action, irregular warfare, long-range penetration, and special reconnaissance assets operating in conjunction on multiple occasions.

Det One's first "real" mission - a close target reconnaissance operation - was aided by a GROM sniper, in which the target (a suspected insurgent sniper) was apprehended by the GROM sniper. Task Unit Raider first operated in and around Baghdad before being ordered by CJSOTF-AP to send its snipers to al-Najaf (a stronghold for the Mahdi Army) to relieve pressure on the 11th MEU. Det One proceeded to demoralize the militiaman by "wiping out" dozens of enemy combatants, confusing them as to the point of origin of the unrelenting lethal fire. In addition, Det One kept their marksman on their SR-25s around the clock-providing no respite for the militia. Det One's Scout snipers also carried out two successful counter-sniper operations, obliterating Shia insurgent positions and the snipers themselves with .50-caliber Barret M82 fire.

In preparation for the Second Battle of Fallujah, Marines from the Det One, along with Green Berets from the 5th SFG, SEALs, and Marine Force Recon, were heavily involved in shaping operations prior to the 7 November D-DAY when coalition forces entered the city.

However, the deployment also revealed interservice tensions. The Navy commander of United States Naval Special Warfare Command (USNSWC) Squadron One did not utilize Det One as a cohesive unit but parceled its capabilities as needed. In particular, the military intelligence section was parceled out to other Navy units, instead of supporting Det One operations, as the Navy lacked military intelligence personnel who understood ground combat.

Following the conclusion of the deployment in September 2004, the Marine Corps and USSOCOM continued to negotiate details of the long-term relationship through 2005, while Det One trained for a possible second deployment. Though deployment proposals were rejected on the basis that Det One was to provide the nucleus of the future permanent United States Marine Forces Special Operations Command (MARSOC) organization, it was disbanded on 10 March 2006 and its members dispersed throughout the Marine Corps. The experience of Det One provided critical military intelligence on the organization and integration of a Marines special operations forces into USSOCOM and was instrumental to the planning of MARSOC.

== See also ==
- 1st Force Reconnaissance Company
- Force Reconnaissance
- Radio Reconnaissance Platoon
- Marine Forces Special Operations Command
- Strider SMF
- Critical skills operator
