= United States Marine Forces Special Operations Command =

United States Marine Corps component command

- Seal of the United States Marine Forces Special Operations Command
- Active: 24 February 2006 – present
- Country: United States
- Branch: United States Marine Corps
- Type: Special Operations Component Command
- Size: 3,195 positions authorized: 2,994 military personnel; 201 civilian personnel
- Part of: U.S. Special Operations Command
- Garrison/HQ: Camp Lejeune, North Carolina
- Motto: "Spiritus Invictus"
- Anniversaries: 24 February 2006
- Engagements: War on terror: Operation Enduring Freedom; Operation Iraqi Freedom; Operation Inherent Resolve; Operation Juniper Shield; Operation Pacific Eagle – Philippines; Operation Freedom's Sentinel

Commanders
- Commander: MajGen Peter D. Huntley
- Notable commanders: see List of commanders

The United States Marine Forces Special Operations Command (MARSOC) is the Marine Corps component to of United States Special Operations Command (USSOCOM). MARSOC's mission is to recruit, train, sustain, and deploy scalable, expeditionary forces worldwide to accomplish special operations missions assigned by USSOCOM.

== History and lineage ==
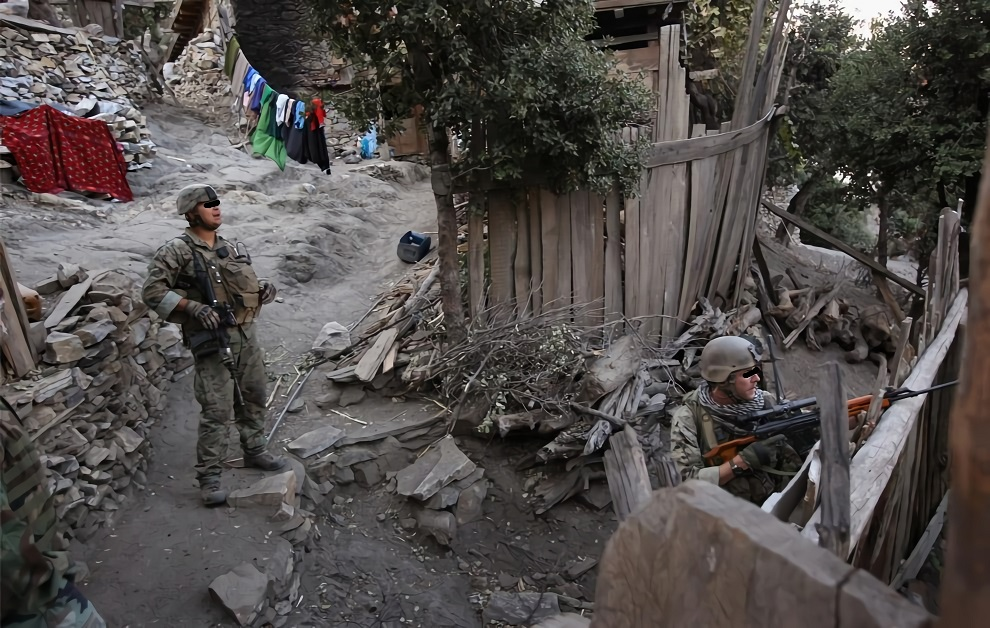
Marine Raiders conduct combat operations in eastern Afghanistan.

MARSOC's creation was announced on 1 November 2005 by U.S. secretary of defense Donald Rumsfeld, following a meeting between Rumsfeld, SOCOM commander General Bryan D. Brown and the Marine Corps Commandant General Michael Hagee on 28 October 2005. MARSOC was officially activated on 24 February 2006 with ceremonies at Camp Lejeune, North Carolina.

The potential participation of the Marine Corps in SOCOM has been controversial since SOCOM was formed in 1986. At the time, Marine Corps leaders felt that their Force Reconnaissance (FORECON) units were best kept in the Marine Corps' Marine Air-Ground Task Force command structure and that the detachment of an elite Marine special operations unit would be to the detriment of the Marine Corps as a whole. A re-evaluation following the September 11 attacks and the Global War on Terrorism, along with new policy established by Secretary Rumsfeld and Commandant General James L. Jones at The Pentagon, caused the Marine Corps to work towards integration with SOCOM. The establishment of MARSOC represented the most significant step towards that goal and followed the establishment of Detachment One (Det One), a small Marine Corps detachment formed as a pilot program to test Marine Corps integration into SOCOM. It was made up of mostly Marines from 1st and 2nd Force Reconnaissance Battalions along with other hand-picked support men and served with Navy SEALs under Naval Special Warfare Group One. Det One conducted a multitude of special operations in Iraq alongside their special operations brothers of the sister services. SOCOM conducted a study of the unit's deployment, which clearly indicated success and strong performance. Det One was disbanded in 2006 soon after the creation of MARSOC. The first of many Marine Special Operations Companies stood up in June 2006.

MARSOC's initial deployment to Afghanistan in 2007 was mired in controversy when its Fox Company was sent back to the United States and its commander relieved from duty after a shooting incident. The incident that resulted in as many as 19 civilians killed involved a complex ambush by insurgents that included a suicide car bomb and small arms fire. Allegations later arose that the MARSOC operators killed the civilians while suppressing enemy fire, but these allegations proved false. MARSOC Marines also took part in Operation Enduring Freedom – Philippines.

Following U.S. Army General David Petraeus' assumption of command in Afghanistan in 2010, in support of the ALP/VSO program (Afghan Local Police/Village Stability Operations), special forces in Afghanistan were task-organized into battalion level SOTF (Special Operations Task Forces), each with a geographic area of responsibility—for MARSOC, this was western Afghanistan and Helmand Province. In March 2012, MARSOC teams suffered several casualties to Green on Blue attacks. In July 2012, a patrol of Afghan Army commandos was ambushed by insurgents from several buildings in Badghis Province and three Afghans were wounded by small arms fire. Gunnery Sergeants Jonathan Gifford and Daniel Price raced forward on an ATV to retrieve the wounded under direct fire from the enemy. After evacuating the wounded to an emergency helicopter landing zone, they returned and assaulted the enemy positions in a fierce close-quarter battle. While throwing grenades down the chimney of an insurgent-occupied building, they were struck and killed by PKM fire; for his actions that day Price was awarded the Silver Star.

On 6 August 2014, MARSOC claimed and officially bestowed the prestigious Marine Raider moniker upon their subordinate combat units (Marine Special Operations Regiment) in commemoration of the fabled and elite amphibious light infantry unit that operated during World War II. Marine Corps Times reported that in 2017, Marine Raiders assisted in the liberation of Marawi from ISIS militants. In February 2019, Marine Corps Times reported that since the formation of MARSOC 13 years before, it had conducted 300 operational deployments across 13 countries, awarded more than 300 valor awards and that 43 Raiders (including two military dogs) had been killed in training and combat operations.

Since MARSOC's first deployment, it has become a strong partner in SOCOM and proven itself able to conduct full-spectrum special operations. They have successfully conducted both long-term counterinsurgency under the VSO program and carried out complex direct action tasks.

== Organization ==
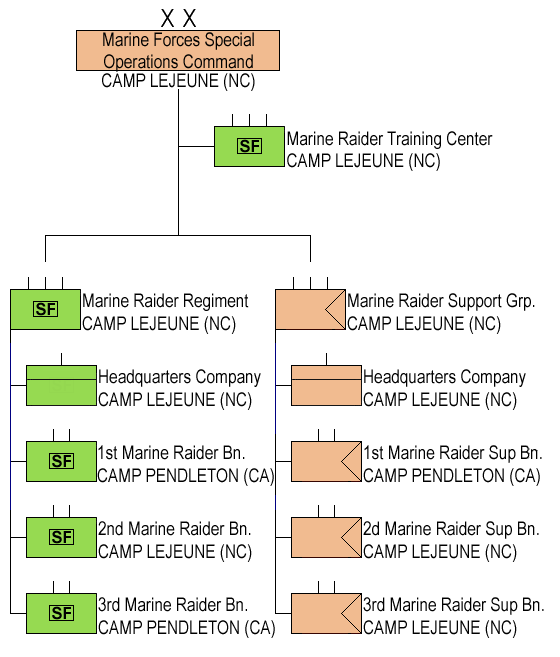
Marine Forces Special Operations Command

The base unit of MARSOC is a fourteen-man Marine Special Operations Team (MSOT), commanded by a captain as team commander, assisted by a master sergeant as team chief. Each team has two identical squads, or tactical elements, each led by a gunnery sergeant as element leader. MARSOC is based at Camp Lejeune, North Carolina, and is split into three subordinate commands:

Name	Insignia	Headquarters	Description
Marine Raider Regiment		Camp Lejeune, NC and Camp Pendleton, CA	The Marine Raider Regiment (MRR; previously MSOR-Marine Special Operations Regiment) consists of a Headquarters Company and three Marine Raider Battalions (1st, 2nd and 3rd). The Marine Raider Battalions (MRB; previously MSOB-Marine Special Operations Battalion) are tasked with direct action, special reconnaissance, counter-terrorism, and information operations. They are also trained to carry out foreign internal defense and unconventional warfare. Each MRB consists of four Marine Special Operations Companies (MSOCs) that contain four Marine Special Operations Teams (MSOTs) in each Company. The organization allows a team to operate on its own if needed, but maintains the ability to operate as part of a larger unit such as an MSOC or SOTF, similar to Army Special Forces ODA/B. The core personnel strength of the MRBs was initially drafted from Force Reconnaissance Marines.
Marine Raider Support Group		Camp Lejeune, NC	The Marine Raider Support Group (MRSG; previously MSOSG-Marine Special Operations Support Group), composed of the Headquarters Company and 1st, 2nd, and 3rd Marine Raider Support Battalions (MRSB; previously MSOSB-Marine Special Operations Support Battalion), contain the Command's administrative, and support assets. The MRSG trains, equips, structures, and provides specially qualified Marine forces to augment MSOTs, including operational logistics, Marine Corps Intelligence, multipurpose canines handlers, Firepower Control Teams and communications support in order to sustain worldwide special operations missions.
Marine Raider Training Center		Camp Lejeune, NC	The mission of the Marine Raider Training Center (MRTC; previously MSOS-Marine Special Operations School) is to assess and select personnel for assignment to Marine Forces Special Operations Command (MARSOC). They conduct language and cultural training, perform required curriculum review and updates of training material for all assigned courses, introduce and reinforce Personnel Resiliency (PERRES).

== Selection ==
=== Prerequisites ===
All Marines are screened to ensure that the Marines joining MARSOC meet the established prerequisites for duty within the command.

- Have a minimum GT score of 105, 110 for officers.
- Have a minimum PFT of 235.
- Be able to pass the MARSOC swim assessment.
- Meet the MARSOC medical screening criteria.
- Be eligible to obtain and maintain a secret clearance.

=== Screening ===
Selection of personnel begins with a rigorous screening process designed to identify the right Marines for the right billet within MARSOC. Operational billets are open to females as of 2016. Screening takes place in 3 stages: record screening, physical screening, and a psychological and medical evaluation.

=== Special Operations Training Course ===
The Special Operations Training Course (SOTC) is six weeks of unhindered, realistic, challenging basic and intermediate Special Operations Forces (SOF) warfighting skills training. During STC, the Special Operations Capabilities Specialists will also attend Survival, Evasion, Resistance and Escape (SERE) training along with a MARSOF Level 1 Course specific to their MOS: Explosive Ordnance Disposal (6 weeks), Communications (12 weeks), Intelligence (14–17 weeks), Joint Terminal Attack Controller (4 weeks), Multi-Purpose Canine (10 weeks).

== Personnel ==
Marine Raider (MR) Formerly known as a Critical Skills Operator or CSO. Marine Raiders are enlisted Marines that have attended and passed MARSOCs six week assessment and selection and have graduated the rigorous 9 month Marine Raider Course (MRC), formally called the Individual Training Course (ITC). Marine Raiders are the primary special operations Marines within MARSOC and the Marine Raider Regiment. They are trained to execute a variety of SOF missions sets including but not limited to Direct Action, Special Reconnaissance, and Irregular Warfare. Specialized training also provides capabilities in language fluency necessary for crossing cultural barriers, allowing Marine Raiders to connect with partnered and local forces as well as civilians. Marines designated as Marine Raiders are awarded the Military Occupational Specialty (MOS) code 0372 Marine Raider. Upon graduation from the MRC, the MARSOCs Basic Language Course (BLC), U.S. Army Basic Airborne Course and the United States Marine Corps Multi-Mission Parachute Course, Marine Raiders are sent to the Marine Raider Regiment (MRR). Here they will join one of the three Marine Raider Battalions (MRB). Upon arrival to an MRB, the Raider will be assigned to a Marine Special Operations Company (MSOC) followed by placement into a Marine Special Operations Team (MSOT).

Marine Raider Officer (MRO) Formerly known as a Special Operations Officer or SOO. Marine Raider Officers are Marine Corps officers that have attended and passed MARSOCs six week assessment and selection, have graduated the Marine Raider Course (MRC) and passed the MARSOCs Team Commander's Course (MTCC). Upon graduation of MTCC and MRC, MROs are awarded the MOS code of 0370 Marine Raider Officer. MROs will attend the U.S. Army Basic Airborne Course and the United States Marine Corps Multi-Mission Parachute Course along with their fellow enlisted Marine Raiders. MROs will be sent to their perspective MRBs and MSOCs where they will ultimately take command and control of an MSOT.

Special Operations Combat Service Specialists (SOCS-Ss) are combat service support Marines who serve one standard tour with MARSOC in their primary MOS. Their training includes core skills for joint and interagency work as well as enhanced SOF combat skills training to enable their successful integration and survivability in special operations environments.

Special Operations Capabilities Specialists (SOCSs) are combat support Marines who are able to join MARSOC based upon their MOS skill. They receive advanced special operations forces training and certification, and frequently deploy alongside CSOs. SOCS billet fields include intelligence, communications, explosive ordnance disposal, dog handlers, and fire-control specialists. SOCSs are awarded the MOS of 8071 and return to the operating forces after an extended tour of service with MARSOC.

== Insignia ==
In August 2016, the Marine Corps approved a new Marine Special Operator Insignia for wear by graduates of the five-phase Individual Training Course (ITC).

== List of commanders ==
- Command of MARSOC is a Major General's billet
1. Dennis Hejlik – February 2006 – April 2008.
2. Mastin M. Robeson – April 2008 – November 2009.
3. Paul E. Lefebvre – November 2009 – August 2012.
4. Mark A. Clark – August 2012 – August 2014.
5. Joseph Osterman – August 2014 – August 2016.
6. Carl E. Mundy III – August 2016 – June 2018.
7. Daniel Yoo – June 2018 – June 2020.
8. James F. Glynn – June 2020 – May 2022.
9. Matthew Trollinger – May 2022 – June 2024.
10. Peter D. Huntley – June 2024 – June 2026.
11. Michael A. Brooks – June 2026 – present.

== Gallery ==
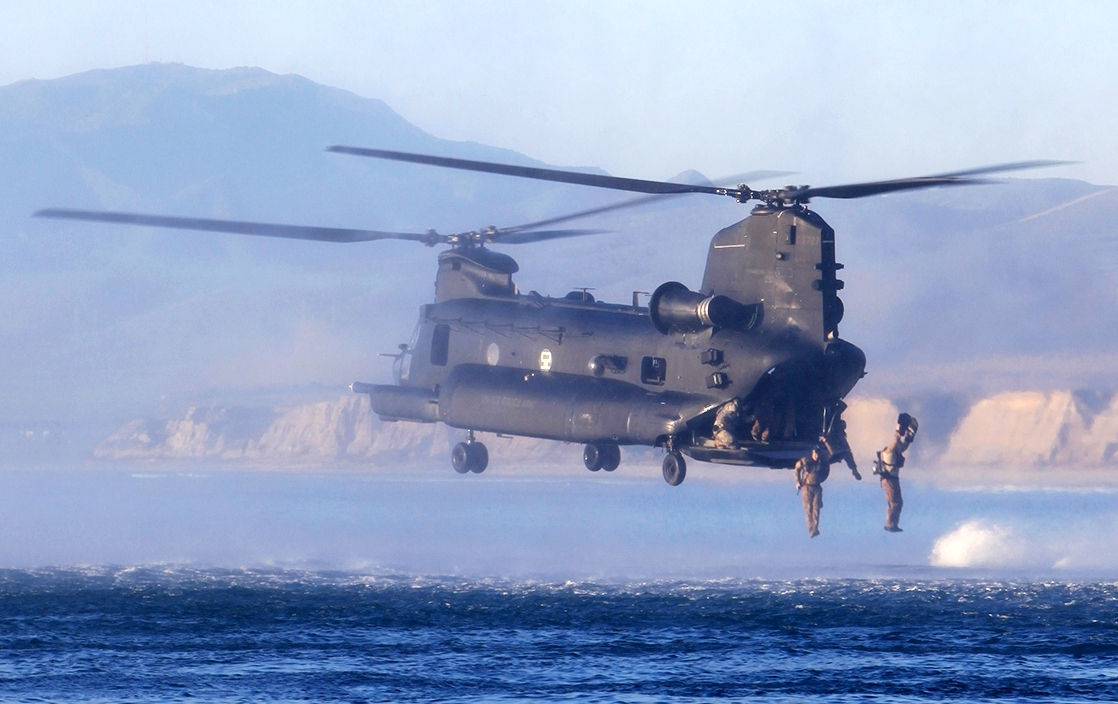
A 160th SOAR(A) MH-47 conducts water insertion of Marine Raiders

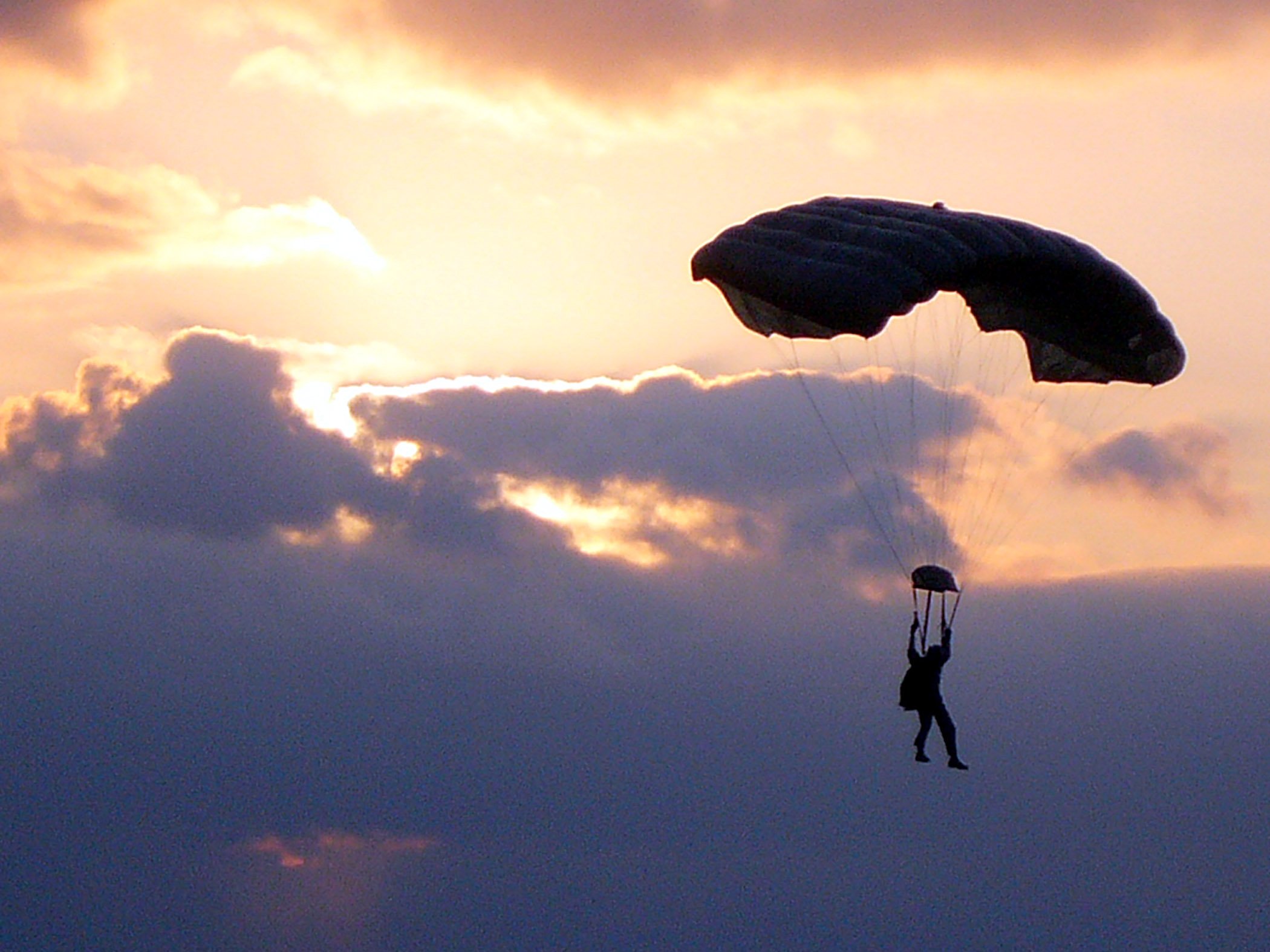
A Marine Raider glides towards his target during high-altitude parachute operations.

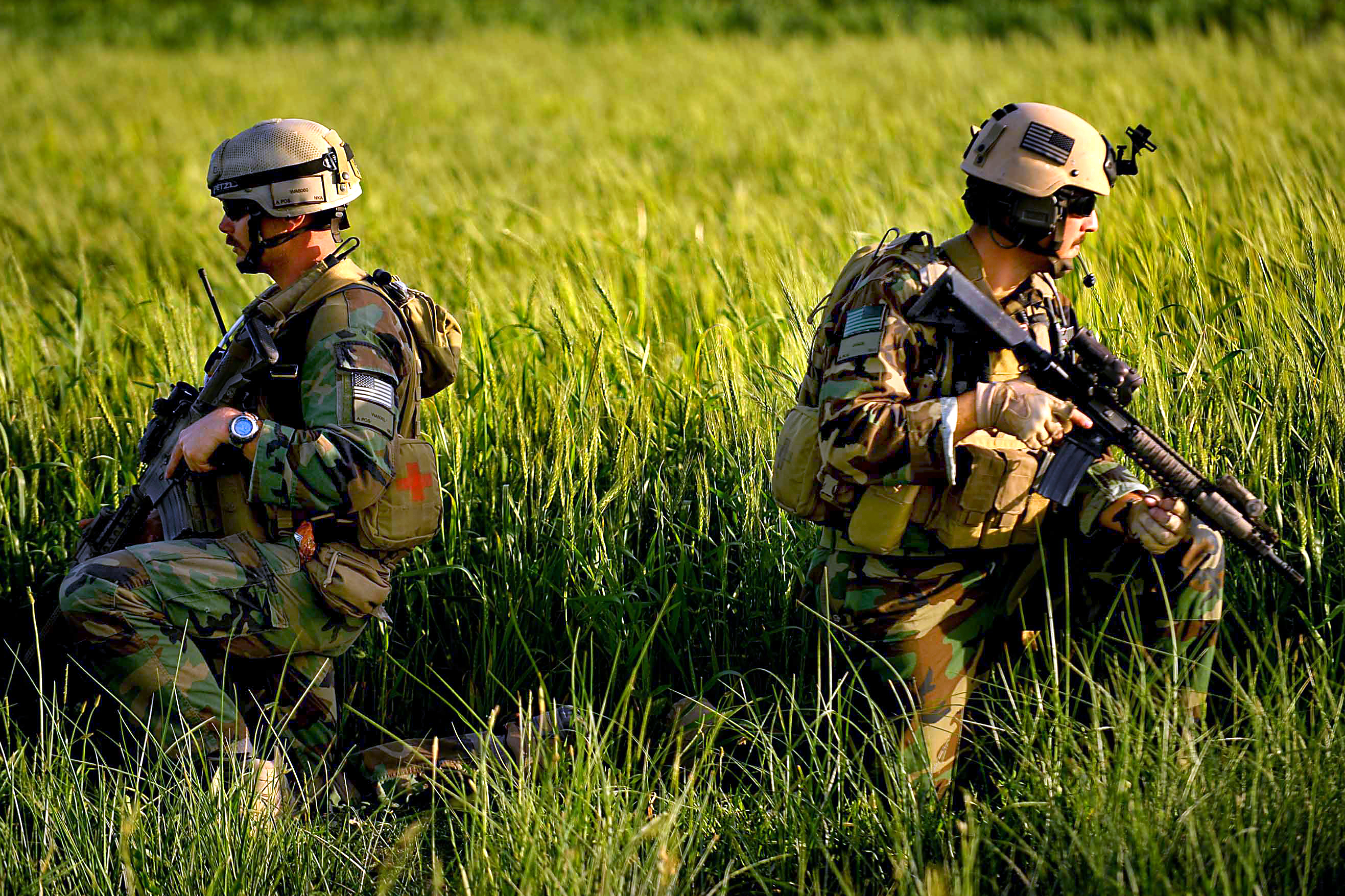
MARSOC operators provide security for friendly forces in Afghanistan's Farah province.

A MARSOC Marine in Helmand province, Afghanistan.

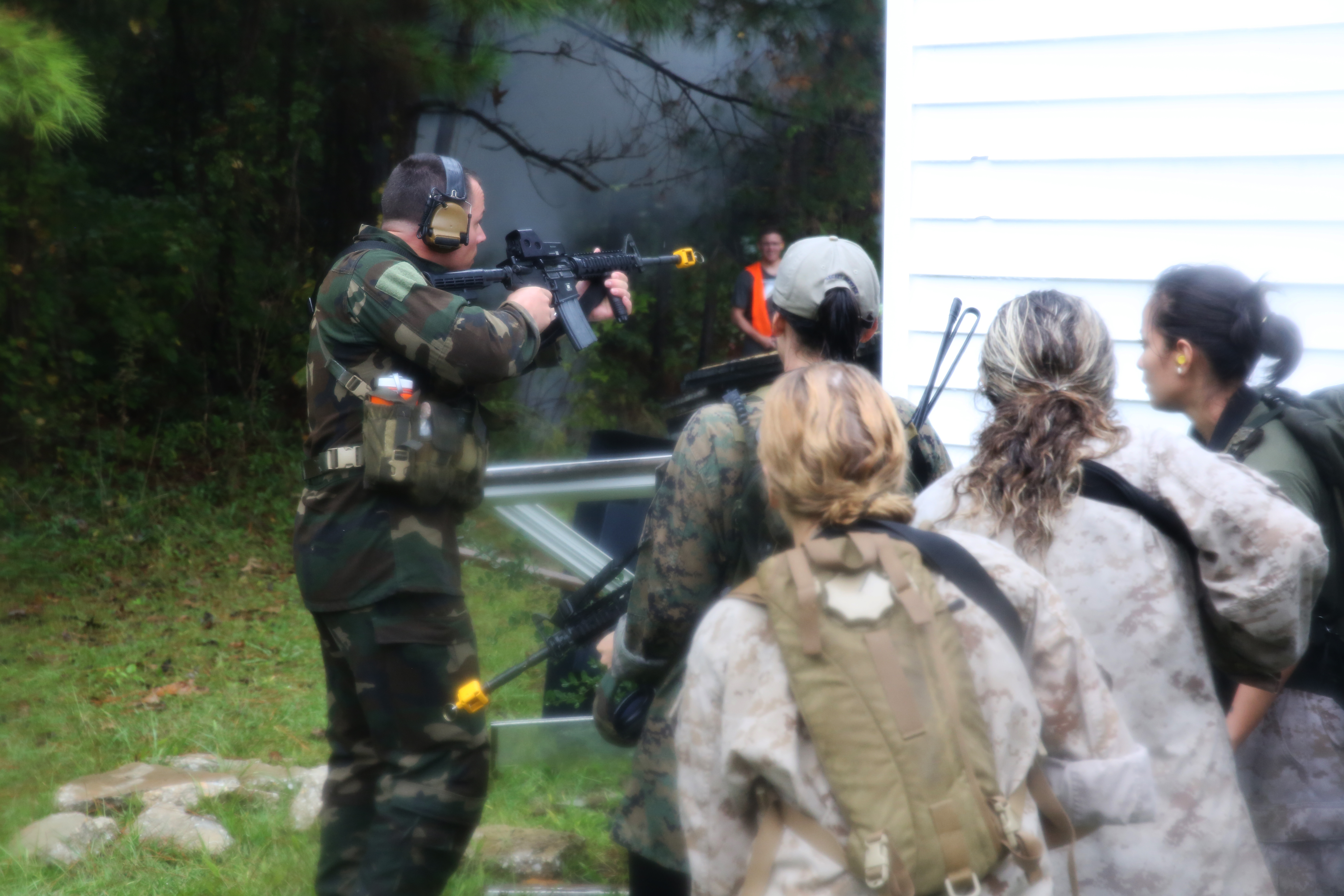
MARSOC wives participate in a simulated raid during Jane Wayne Day

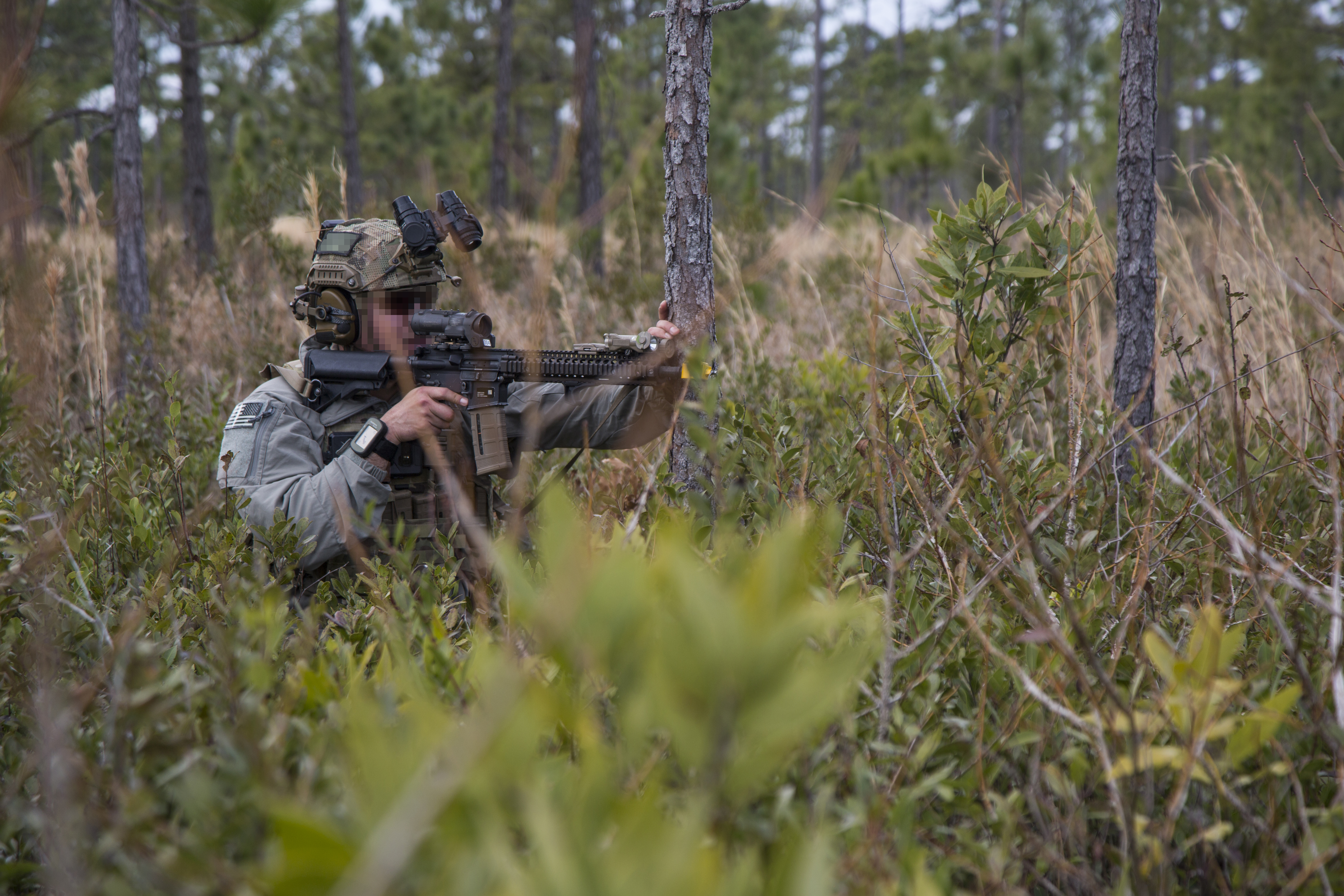
Special Operations Capability Specialists with 2nd Marine Raider Support Battalion training at Camp Lejeune, N.C.

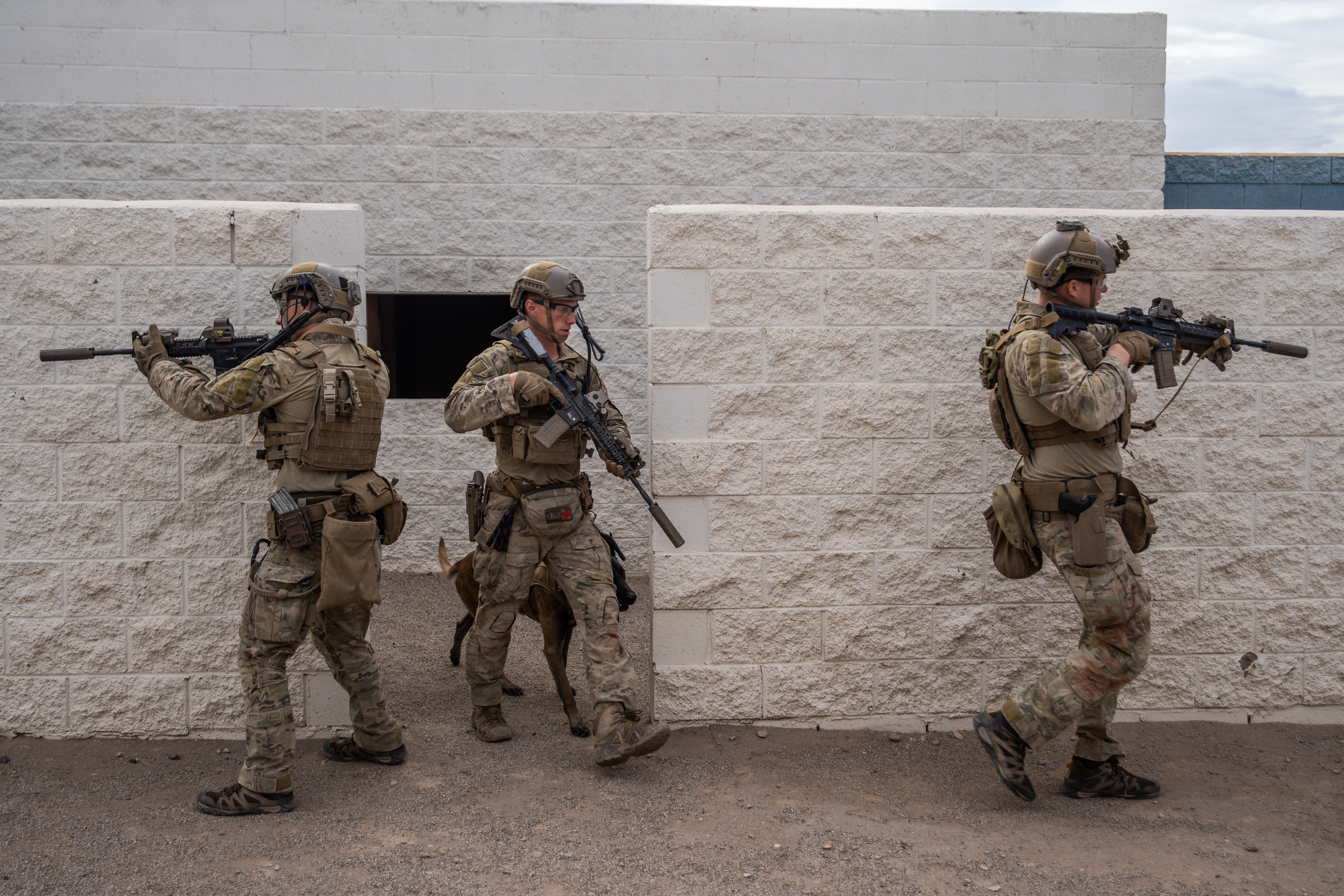
Marine Raider Support Group members execute urban detection training during a Special Operations Capabilities Specialist D (Multi-Purpose Canine Handler) training course

== See also ==
- Air Force Special Operations Command
- Joint Special Operations Command
- Organization of the United States Marine Corps
- United States Army Special Operations Command
- Ground Mobility Vehicle – (US)SOCOM program
- United States Naval Special Warfare Command

== Works cited ==
- Neville, Leigh (2015). Special Forces in the War on Terror. Oxford: Osprey Publishing. ISBN 978-1472807908. OCLC 889735079.
