= United States Marine Corps Reconnaissance Selection and Indoctrination =

Military screening and training process

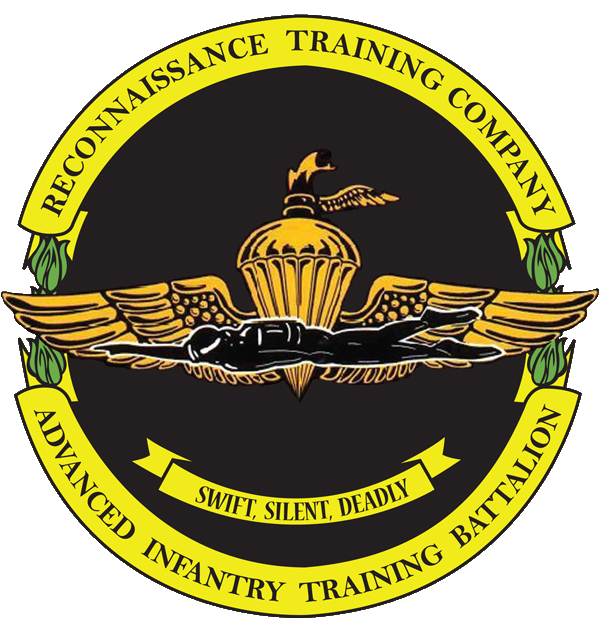

The two amphibious/ground reconnaissance assets of the United States Marine Corps, Division and Force Reconnaissance, are generally trained in the same aspect and environment of intelligence collection for a Marine Air–Ground Task Force (MAGTF) Commander, regardless of their difference in tactical area of responsibility (TAOR). However, in light of their distinctive responsibilities in their assigned areas of operations—whereas Division Recon conducts close and distant operations, Force Recon conducts deep operations—these two separate reconnaissance assets manage their own training protocols to fit their mission-oriented objectives.

== Preliminary requirements ==
Prerequisites for screening:

- Updated and current physical
- General Technical (GT) score of 105 or higher.
- Physical Fitness Test 1st Class score
- WSI (or WSB+ if applicable) swim qualification
- Have 20/200 near visual acuity or visual acuity not to exceed 20/400 with a completed PRK eye surgery. Normal color vision is recommended, but not required provided the Marine can complete a vivid red and vivid green recognition test.
- 18 months minimum remaining on current enlistment contract upon completion of the basic reconnaissance course
- Be able to obtain a "Secret" security clearance
- Have completed the infantry course at the Infantry Training Battalion, School of Infantry

== Selection ==
Becoming a qualified Reconnaissance Marine starts at the recon selection, or screening board, whether for assignment to Radio Recon, Scout Snipers, Division Recon, or Force Recon. The screening process tests potential recon candidates in their combat swimming skills, physical stamina and endurance; it is a 48-hour event that is held on the last Thursday of each month at either MCB Camp Pendleton or MCB Camp Lejeune; the FMF Reconnaissance and all the organic division reconnaissance assets conduct their own distinct selection process. Force Recon held their screening board at Camp Horno and near Las Flores on Camp Pendleton.

If failed, the Marines are encouraged to try the screening process again later. Any candidate may also voluntarily dropout at any time during the screening process and retake the test later. Multiple screening attempts are common before succeeding. Division recon Marines had to retake the Force Recon's indoc if they were to change from a division-level to a force-level command, regardless of their prior qualifications.

Because Marines are amphibious by nature, the candidates begin with a 25 m (82 ft) underwater swim. The candidates also must conduct a deep water rifle retrieval. The mock rifle is normally a rubber model of the service rifle ("rubber duck"); 10lb pool bricks are sometimes used instead by the Force Recon's selection board. The candidates would then have to carry the concrete block to the surface and swim it to a designated spot.

Next is a 25 ft (7.6 m) tower jump into water with full combat gear, followed by 30 minutes of treading water. Additional tests include five-minute flotation with trousers (removed and turned into improvised flotation aids) and a timed 500 m (1,600 ft) swim. After the pool screening is completed, the candidates run in formation down to the red course to perform a physical fitness test. They are required to obtain a 1st Class score of 225 or higher.

The next day, the candidates run an obstacle course a few times. The candidates are judged on their effort and method of attempting the "O" Course, not by how fast they complete it. The last event in the selection and screening board is a run with a plastic rifle and a field pack containing a 50 lb (23 kg) sand bag. They are expected to maintain a pace of four- to five-miles per hour. The Division Recon requires the candidates to run an 8 mi (13 km) course; the FMF Recon demanded an additional 10 mi (16 km) "boots and utes" ruck sack run over the hills of Las Flores and down along the beach. Failure to maintain this pace results in the candidate being dropped. Once the recon Marine candidates pass all physical and evaluation tests, they are given a psychological screening test and an interview.

They will then be interviewed by the recon command's staff; the officers are interviewed by the company commander, the enlisted Marines are interviewed by the company sergeant major and other staff non-commissioned officers.

In 2007, the Marine Corps folded the recon screening process into the initial phases of the Basic Reconnaissance Course.

== Indoctrination ==
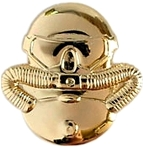
USMC Combatant Diving Badge, 2006-present

Before 2004, all potential recon Marine candidates were placed in Recon Indoctrination Program, or RIP. In RIP, the candidates are given further training in patrolling, amphibious reconnaissance, communications and land orientation which warmed-up the Marines before attending the rigorous and demanding Basic Reconnaissance Course (BRC). It was considered to be the Marines' equivalent of [Navy SEAL's] "Hell Week". Sometimes Marines in RIP would remain in the platoon for weeks or possibly months; until there were openings in processing for the BRC syllabus.

Since the Marine Corps do not receive the appropriated funds to build the proper training facilities that would accommodate the recon Marines' specialized training, the Corps opted to use the Army's and Navy's training functions instead. This led to complications because the Marine training liaisons had to set up training agendas to meet the cross-service schools' class schedules. It has been known to take weeks or months, depending on the training quota that was able to be met.

However, due to changes made recently, Marines who wish to join the reconnaissance community must first complete the School of Infantry's Rifleman Course prior to being assigned to the 'Marines Awaiting Recon Training' (MART) platoon. Nonetheless, both the Indoctrination programs of RIP and MART were/are designed to prepare the recon candidates for the upcoming Basic Reconnaissance Course, which introduces them to the amphibious reconnaissance community.

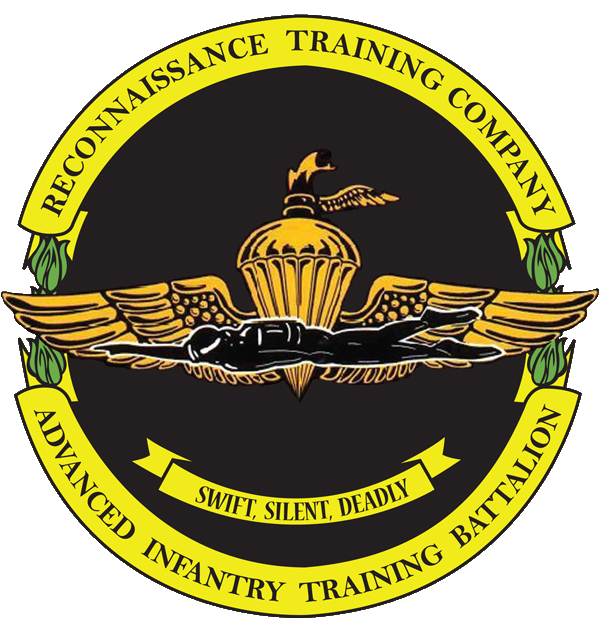
Recon Training Company, SOI (West)

The United States Marine Corps Reconnaissance Training Company trains Marines in the amphibious environment as a Reconnaissance Marine, MOS 0321. It is under the Advanced Infantry Training Battalion (AITB) of the School of Infantry (West), Marine Corps Base Camp Pendleton, California.

== Marines Awaiting Reconnaissance Training (MART) ==
This is the platoon that all junior Marines go to while preparing for RTAP. It is an intensive workout program that develops the Marines to the standards needed to successfully complete RTAP. It also provides manpower for working parties around the RTC barracks and training facilities. Marines in this platoon typically do a pool based workout in the morning followed by a land based workout in the afternoon. They are supervised by the Instructors, as well as by “Ropers”, i.e. Marines who have completed RTAP but are waiting to pickup with a BRC course.

== Reconnaissance Training and Assessment Program (RTAP) ==
RTAP (formerly known as BRC Primer Course) is a 5 week course (25 training days) designed to select Marines that are physically and mentally able to attend and pass the Basic Reconnaissance Course (BRC). Candidates must pass a Reconnaissance Selection Aptitude Test on day 1 which includes a minimum 8 pullups, crunches, pushups, 3 mile run in maximum time of 22 minutes and 30 seconds and a 500 meter swim in 20 minutes wearing camouflage utilities RTAP focuses the students mental strength and physical fitness on land as well as in the water. Students can expect daily running, swimming and calisthenics required for the Basic Reconnaissance Course. Students receive training and evaluations on knots/management of mountaineering equipment, water survival advanced, combat conditioning, and land navigation practice/test. Any student can Drop on Request (DOR) and will be reassigned usually back to original unit or MOS. All students regardless of rank must attend and complete RTAP prior to attending the Basic Reconnaissance Course.

== Basic Reconnaissance Course (BRC) ==
BRC is a 12 week course (69 training days) with an average training day of 15.5 hours and introduces the students to the amphibious reconnaissance environment. During this tenure, they gain working knowledge of the reconnaissance doctrines, concepts and techniques that emphasize ground and amphibious reconnaissance missions. They also learn the fundamentals of all types of weapons (air, sea, and land) that are employed in supporting arms such as calling and adjusting naval gunfire, artillery, and close air support.

The BRC was relocated in 2007 from the Amphibious Reconnaissance Schools (ARS) on Fort Story at Little Creek, Virginia and Expeditionary Warfare Training Group at Coronado, California to the School of Infantry (West) on MCB Camp Pendleton. This facilitated the reconstruction of the course's training protocol and to meet the demands of 600 more recon Marines per year.

Candidates are issued a 12-foot (3.7 m) rope; at any time instructors will demand candidates tie knots of the instructor's choice. Due to that practice, the candidates are often known as "ropers". The term "ropers" was borrowed from the Reconnaissance Indoctrination Platoon (indoc platoon) which was dissolved in 2004.

Students practice day and night learning to operate behind enemy lines and how to conduct immediate action drills. Surveillance and reconnaissance skills such as photography with field and underwater cameras are taught along with field sketching and range estimations. In addition, Recon students learn insertion/extraction techniques in Combat Rubber Raiding Craft (CRRC) and Helicopter Rope Suspension Training (HRST).

Even though every Marine has learned to read a map and compass and to patrol beginning in boot camp, BRC training is more in depth to ensure that the candidates will operate efficiently in small 4 to 6 man recon teams. Candidates will need to complete a 12-mile, three-hour march with more than 50-pounds of equipment and an hour long, 1 ¼-mile open-water swim with fins. Upon graduation, Marines receive the 0321 MOS, Reconnaissance Marine. For those Marines who are already qualified as parachutists and combatant divers, particularly recon Marines assigned to Force Reconnaissance companies, the special "B" 0326 MOS, Reconnaissance Marine, Parachutist/Combatant Diver Qualified is assigned.

The course encompasses:

- advanced patrolling
- advanced radio communications
- reporting procedures
- advanced maritime and land navigation
- reconnaissance and surveillance techniques
- Ground and Engineer reconnaissance
- forward observing for artillery
- amphibious and special operations
- coxswain skills
- over-the-horizon (OTH) warfare

== Accession Pipeline ==
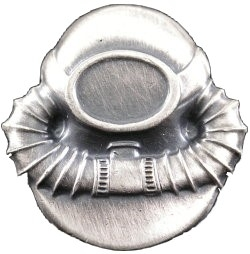
USN SCUBA Diver Badge, 1980-2006

The Accession Pipeline is a series of schools that the Marines attend before being assigned their designated reconnaissance MOS. It may take one or two schools, or it may take several, before they are fully qualified in their described Military Occupational Specialty or MOS. On average, it will take 1.5 to 2-years to train a fully qualified Marine Reconnaissance Operator. Since the Marine Corps lacks the facilities, they usually outsource their training to other cross-service schools sponsored by the United States Army and Navy.

The 'primary' focus of qualifications is for Marines to be fully functional as the MOS 0321, Reconnaissance Man. To obtain the proper designated MOS, they must attend the Basic Reconnaissance Course (BRC). The BRC is required for both Division and Force Recon.

Those recon Marines that complete the Basic Airborne Course retain the MOS 0323, "Reconnaissance Man, Parachutist Qualified", those that complete the USMC Combatant Diver Course, have the MOS 0324, "Reconnaissance Man, Combatant Diver Qualified" and those having both qualifications, the MOS 0326, "Reconnaissance Man, Parachutist and Combatant Diver Qualified".

Before the Marine Corps adopted a new designated change of the billeted Reconnaissance MOS, the Marines retained a secondary (Special "B"-categorized) MOS that was to be implemented along with their primary MOS of 0321 (e.g. 0321/8654). The MOS subtly changed respectively into primary designations over time (i.e. 8652 merged into 0323; 8653 into 0324; 8654 into 0326) without any further need to maintain a secondary MOS designation.

Normally, the division reconnaissance assets do not have a large portion of parachute and combat diver qualified recon Marines, but do have some designated by the division commanders if the situation permits. The FMF's recon operators, however, are required to be parachutists and combat divers, since they are required to insert deeper into the battlespace by parachute or submarine insertions.

Division and Force Recon Marines must complete Level "C" of the Survival, Evasion, Resistance and Escape (SERE) School. Level "C" SERE is a course intended for high risk personnel that are carrying top secret compartmented information and are of high risk of capture.

== Advanced training ==
US Navy and Marine Corps Parachutist badge (formerly known as the US Navy Certified Parachute Rigger badge)

When slots become available and the FMF budget permits it, the recon Marines of both the division and force may attend other advanced courses from cross-service schools. These schools may not be required but many of the recon Marines request approval from the company commander to become students for further training.

Here are the following schools that are attended, if available:

- Marine Corps Combatant Diver Course* — Navy Diving Salvage and Training Center, Naval Support Activity Panama City, Florida
- Survival, Evasion, Resistance and Escape School* — Navy Remote Training Sites; NAS North Island, CA or NAS Brunswick, ME
- Army Airborne School* — Fort Benning, GA
- United States Army Static Line Jumpmaster School (Fort Benning, Georgia)
- United States Army Ranger School (Fort Benning, Georgia)
- Special Operations Training Group Schools (i.e. Urban Sniper, HRST, etc.) (SOTG)* — One SOTG exists under each MEF; I MEF, II MEF, and III MEF.
- Recon and Surveillance Leaders Course — Ranger School, Fort Benning, GA
- Pathfinder Course — Army Infantry School, Fort Benning, or Army Air Assault School, Fort Campbell, Kentucky
- Military Free Fall (John F. Kennedy Special Warfare Center) / Multi Mission Parachutist Course (CPS Coolidge, AZ)
- Military Free Fall (Jumpmaster) School — John F. Kennedy Special Warfare Center and School
- Mountain Leaders (Summer/Winter) Course — Pickle Meadows, CA
- Scout Sniper Course — School of Infantry (West), Camp Pendleton, CA; Camp Lejeune, NC; Quantico, VA; or MCB Hawaii
- Mountain Sniper (Bridgeport, California)
- Reconnaissance Team Leader Course (Camp Pendleton, CA)
- Scout/Sniper Team Leader Course
- Methods of Entry / Breacher (MCB Quantico, VA)
- Joint Terminal Attack Controller (Expeditionary Warfare Training Group Atlantic/Pacific)
- High Risk Personnel (HRP) Course — MCB Quantico

* required for all members of Force Reconnaissance.
