= Douglas A. Zembiec =

United States Marine Corps officer

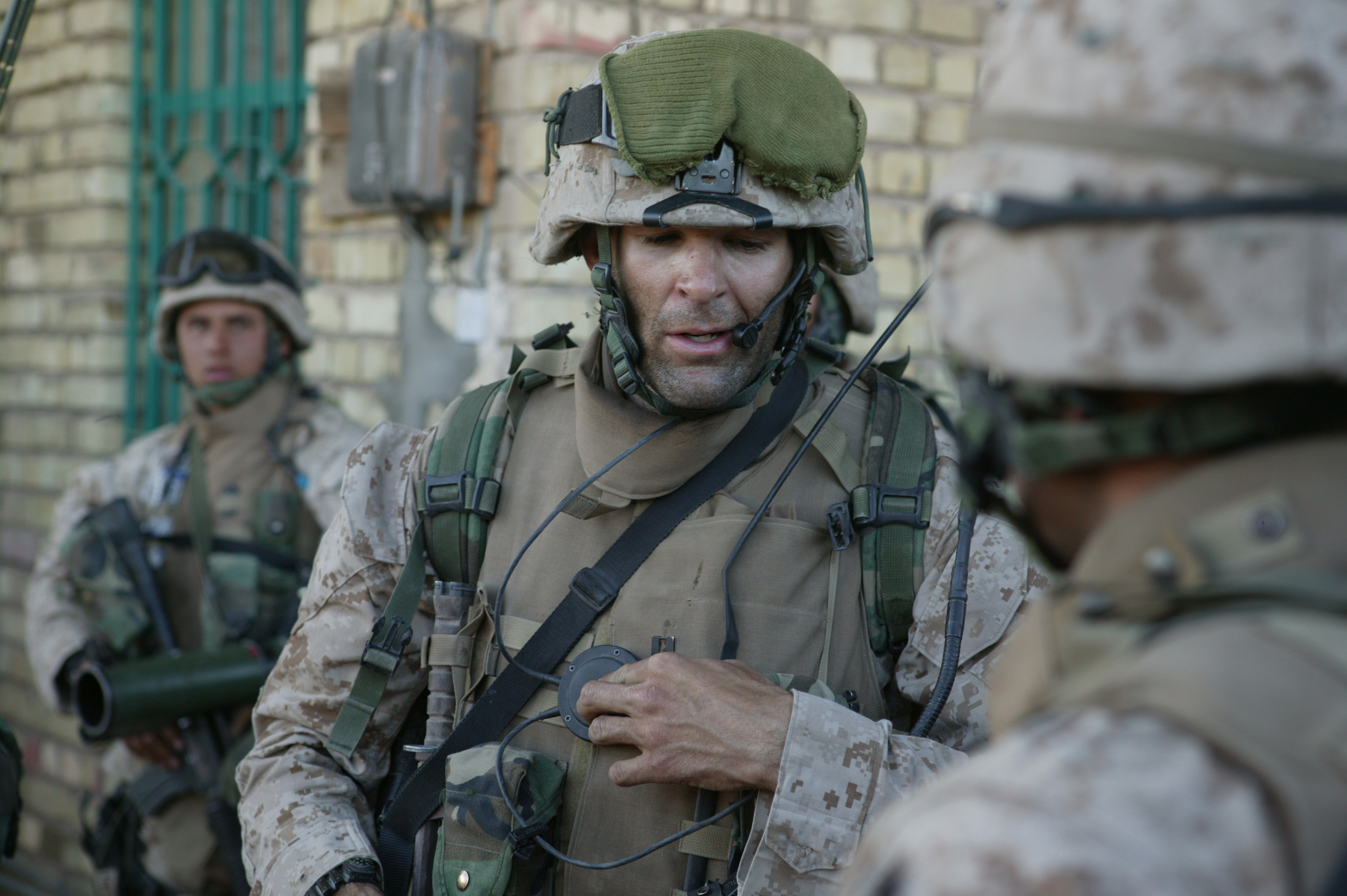
- Zembiec, during the First Battle of Fallujah, Iraq, in 2004
- Born: Douglas Alexander Zembiec; April 14, 1973; Kealakekua, Hawaii, United States
- Died: May 11, 2007 (aged 34); Baghdad, Iraq
- Burial place: Arlington National Cemetery
- Military career
- Allegiance: United States
- Branch: United States Marine Corps; Special Activities Center
- Service years: 1995–2007
- Rank: Major
- Nickname: "Lion of Fallujah"
- Units: 1st Battalion, 6th Marines; 2nd Force Reconnaissance Company; 2nd Battalion, 1st Marines
- Awards: Silver Star; Bronze Star with Combat Distinguishing Device; Purple Heart (2)

Douglas Alexander Zembiec (April 14, 1973 – May 11, 2007), nicknamed the "Lion of Fallujah" and also referred to as the "Unapologetic Warrior", was an officer in the United States Marine Corps and member of the CIA's Special Activities Division's Ground Branch who was killed in action while serving in Operation Iraqi Freedom. He is best known for his actions during Operation Vigilant Resolve, which were detailed in the book No True Glory by Bing West and for an article that ran in The Wall Street Journal following his death.

== Biography ==
=== Early life ===
Doug Zembiec was born on April 14, 1973, in Kealakekua, Hawaii. He attended La Cueva High School in Albuquerque, New Mexico, where he was a New Mexico state high school wrestling champion in 1990 and 1991. As a wrestler, Zembiec was the first New Mexico State Champion in any sport and the first repeat winner from La Cueva High School. He was undefeated in competition his senior year.

He attended the United States Naval Academy where he was a member of 23rd Company, and a collegiate wrestler compiling a 95–21–1 record and finishing as a two-time NCAA All-American. His fellow wrestlers sometimes referred to him as "The Snake" for his anaconda-like grip. Zembiec was well known amongst his contemporaries throughout his athletic and professional life for his exceptional physical fitness. His coach, Reginald Wicks, referred to him as "the best-conditioned athlete I've ever been around." Zembiec graduated on May 31, 1995.

=== Military career ===
Upon graduation from the Naval Academy, Zembiec was commissioned as a second lieutenant in the United States Marine Corps. After finishing The Basic School, and the Infantry Officer's Course, he was assigned to 1st Battalion, 6th Marines as a rifle platoon commander in Bravo Company, starting April 1996. After successfully passing the Force Reconnaissance Selection and Indoctrination in June 1997, Zembiec transferred to 2nd Force Reconnaissance Company. As part of his training for Force Reconnaissance, Zembiec completed Jump School as well as the Marine Combatant Diver Course. He served for two and a half years as a platoon commander, eight months as an interim company commander, and one month as an operations officer.

Zembiec's Force Reconnaissance platoon was among the first special operations forces to enter Kosovo during Operation Joint Guardian in June 1999.

In September 2000, he was transferred to the Amphibious Reconnaissance School (ARS) located in Fort Story, Virginia, and served as the Assistant Officer-In-Charge (AOIC) for two years.

In 2001, Zembiec competed in the Armed Forces Eco-Challenge as team captain of Team Force Recon Rolls Royce.

From ARS, Zembiec was selected to attend the Marine Corps' Expeditionary Warfare School in Quantico, Virginia, graduating in May 2003. Following the Expeditionary Warfare School he took command of Echo Company, 2nd Battalion, 1st Marine Regiment, 1st Marine Division in July 2003.

He was nicknamed the "Lion of Fallujah" as a result of his heroic actions commanding Echo Company during Operation Vigilant Resolve (also known as the First Battle of Fallujah) in 2004 as well as comments he made extolling the heroism of his Marines, saying "they fought like lions". As a rifle company commander, he led 168 Marines and Navy Corpsmen in the first conventional ground assault into Fallujah. During one engagement, he ran out from cover despite heavy machine gun and RPG fire, jumped on an allied tank to help direct its fire, then returned to cover unscathed. A fellow officer stated "The jaws of every Marine there had dropped. It was like, 'Did he just do that?' I am a God-fearing man, but he just sort of walked on water that day". His company suffered two KIA and 50 wounded during the battle. The letter he wrote to the family of Lance Cpl. Aaron C. Austin was included in the Operation Homecoming book released in 2006. As a result, he earned the Bronze Star with Combat Distinguishing Device and the Purple Heart.

He turned over command of Echo Company in October 2004 and served as an assistant operations officer at the Marine Corps' First Special Operations Training Group (1st SOTG) where he ran the urban patrolling / Military Operations in Urban Terrain (MOUT) and tank-infantry training packages for the 13th Marine Expeditionary Unit in preparation for an upcoming deployment to Iraq. Zembiec transferred from 1st SOTG to the Regional Support Element, Headquarters, Marine Corps on June 10, 2005. His promotion to Major was effective on July 1, 2005.

=== Death ===
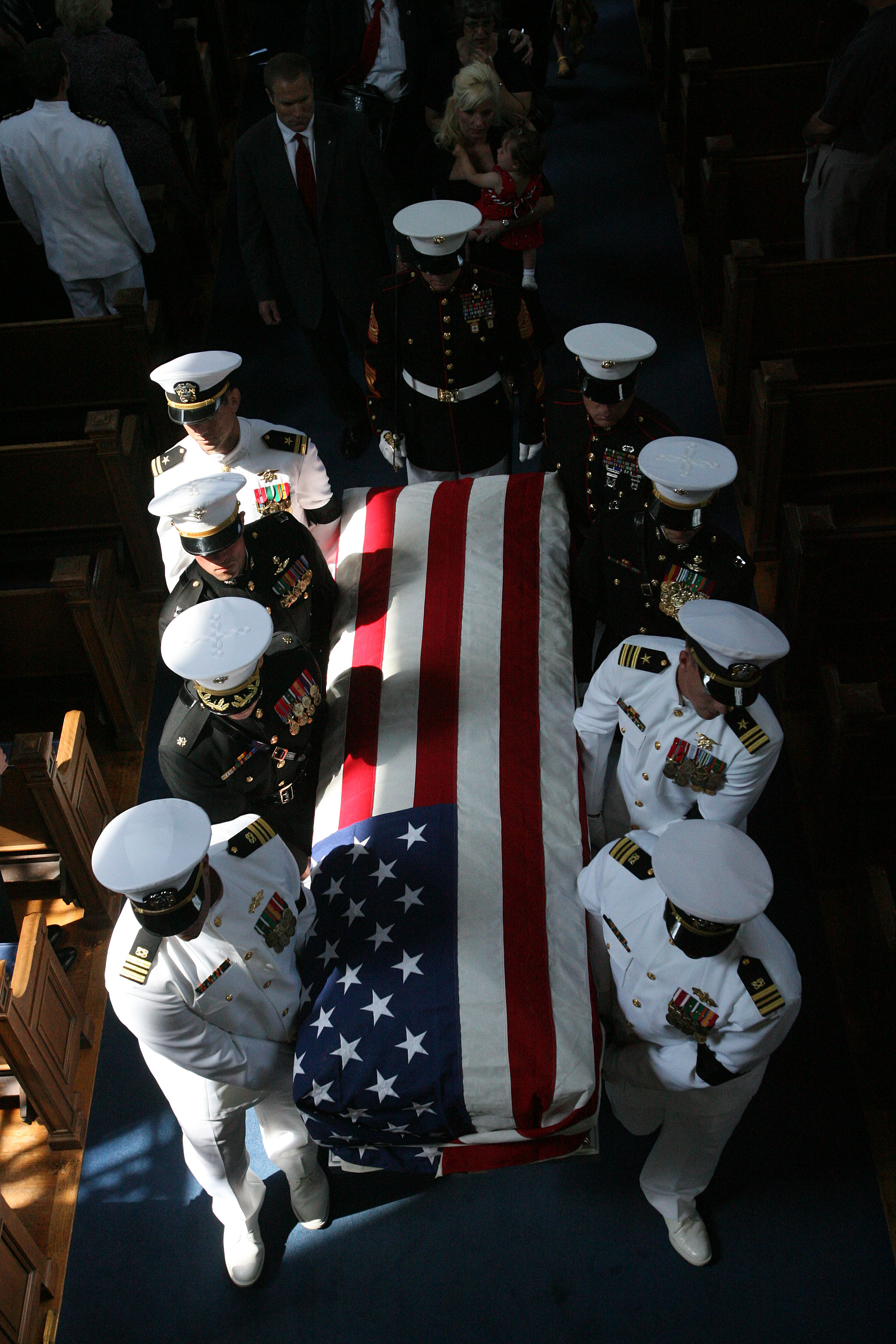
Zembiec's pallbearers carry his coffin following a memorial service

Zembiec was serving in the Ground Branch of the CIA's Special Activities Division in Iraq when he was killed by small arms fire while leading a raid in Sadr City, a neighborhood of Baghdad, on May 11, 2007. Zembiec was leading a unit of Iraqi forces he had helped train. Reports from fellow servicemen that were present when he was killed indicate that he had warned his troops to get down before doing so himself and was hit by enemy fire. The initial radio report indicated "five wounded and one martyred" with Zembiec having been killed and his men saved by his warning. He was posthumously awarded the Silver Star and Purple Heart for his actions that day. On May 16, 2007, a funeral mass was held at the Naval Academy Chapel with nearly 1,000 in attendance, about 40 of whom were enlisted Marines. It was a testament to the honor and respect his former Marines held him in as one officer observed "Your men have to follow your orders; they don't have to go to your funeral". Later that day he was interred at Arlington National Cemetery, Grave Number 8621, Section Number 60. Shortly after his death, he was honored with a star on the CIA Memorial Wall, which remembers CIA employees who died while in service. Although Zembiec's star officially remains anonymous as of July 2014, his CIA employment was confirmed in interviews with his widow and former U.S. intelligence officials.

In July 2007, Secretary of Defense Robert Gates publicly lost his composure, showing signs of grief, while discussing Zembiec during a speech. Zembiec was also prominently featured in a high-profile column in The Wall Street Journal in September 2007. In November 2007, Zembiec's high school alma mater, La Cueva High School, inducted him as the charter member of their hall of fame and named the wrestling room in his honor. The NCAA announced that Zembiec would be awarded the 2008 NCAA Award of Valor. In January 2008 General David Petraeus, Commander of Multi-National Force – Iraq, dedicated the helipad at Camp Victory located at Baghdad International Airport in Zembiec's name. He referred to Zembiec as "a true charter member of the brotherhood of the close fight." Zembiec is survived by his mother and his wife and daughter, Pamela and Fallyn.

In May 2008, the United States Naval Academy created an award presented annually to the graduating midshipman who exhibits exemplary leadership and drive to be an outstanding Marine Officer. This award is presented in his honor and is named the Maj. Doug Zembiec Award.

On May 11, 2009, a petition was presented to the Secretary of the Navy to have the next Arleigh Burke-class destroyer to be commissioned named after Zembiec.

The swimming pool located at the Marine Corps' Henderson Hall is named in honor of Zembiec.

By order of the Commandant of the Marine Corps, the Douglas A. Zembiec Award for Outstanding small unit Leadership in Special Operations was created on April 11, 2011, to annually recognize the Marine officer who "best exemplifies outstanding leadership as a Team Leader in the Marine Corps Special Operations Community."

== Quotes ==
Zembiec left many volumes of personal writings behind, some of which were shared at his funeral. The final words of the eulogy, delivered by his friend Eric L. Kapitulik, related some of those writings:

Be a man of principle. Fight for what you believe in. Keep your word. Live with integrity. Be brave. Believe in something bigger than yourself. Serve your country. Teach. Mentor. Give something back to society. Lead from the front. Conquer your fears. Be a good friend. Be humble and be self-confident. Appreciate your friends and family. Be a leader and not a follower. Be valorous on the field of battle. And take responsibility for your actions. Never forget those that were killed. And never let rest those that killed them.

Kapitulik said the creed came from the man who knew Zembiec the longest, as indicated by his written description: "Principles my father taught me."

Other quotes: "Killing is not wrong if it's for a purpose, if it's to keep your nation free or protect your buddy. One of the most noble things you can do is kill the enemy."

== Awards ==
=== Silver Star Citation ===
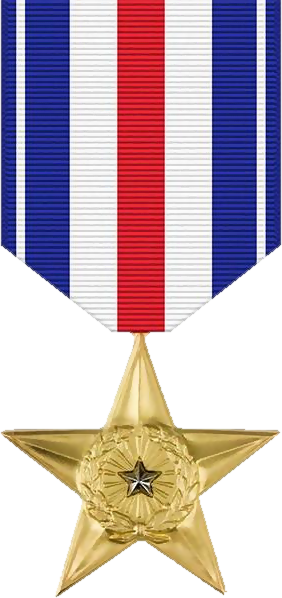

Citation:

The President of the United States of America takes pride in presenting the Silver Star (Posthumously) to Major Douglas Alexander Zembiec, United States Marine Corps, for conspicuous gallantry and intrepidity in action against the enemy while serving as a Marine Advisor, Iraq Assistance Group, Multi-National Corps, Iraq, in support of Operation IRAQI FREEDOM on 11 May 2007. Attacking from concealed and fortified positions, an enemy force engaged Major Zembiec's assault team, firing crew-served automatic weapons and various small arms. He boldly moved forward and immediately directed the bulk of his assault team to take cover. Under withering enemy fire, Major Zembiec remained in an exposed, but tactically critical, position in order to provide leadership and direct effective suppressive fire on the enemy combatant positions with his assault team's machine gun. In doing so, he received the brunt of the enemy's fire, was struck and succumbed to his wounds. Emboldened by his actions his team and supporting assault force aggressively engaged the enemy combatants. Major Zembiec's quick thinking and timely action to re-orient his team's machine gun enabled the remaining members of his unit to rapidly and accurately engage the primary source of the enemy's fire saving the lives of his comrades. By his bold initiative, undaunted courage, and complete dedication to duty, Major Zembiec reflected great credit upon himself and upheld the highest traditions of the Marine Corps and the United States Naval Service.

=== Commendations ===
Zembiec's military decorations include:

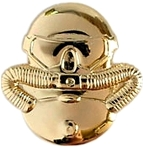

Badge	Marine Corps Combatant Diver Insignia		
Badge	Navy and Marine Corps Parachutist Badge		
1st Row	Silver Star		Bronze Star w/ valor device
2nd Row	Purple Heart w/ 1 award star	Navy and Marine Corps Commendation Medal w/ 1 award star	Navy and Marine Corps Achievement Medal w/ 1 award star
3rd Row	Combat Action Ribbon w/ 1 award star	Navy Unit Commendation	Navy Meritorious Unit Commendation
4th Row	National Defense Service Medal w/ 1 service star	Kosovo Campaign Medal	Afghanistan Campaign Medal w/ 1 service star
5th Row	Iraq Campaign Medal w/ 1 service star	Global War on Terrorism Expeditionary Medal	Global War on Terrorism Service Medal
6th Row	Humanitarian Service Medal	Sea Service Deployment Ribbon w/ 2 service stars	NATO Medal for Kosovo
Badges	Expert marksmanship badge for rifle		Expert marksmanship badge for pistol
