= George Honour =

Royal Navy officer of World War II (1918–2002)

- Born: George Butler Honour; 10 October 1918; Bristol, England
- Died: 16 May 2002 (aged 83); Dorset, England
- Military career
- Allegiance: United Kingdom
- Branch: Royal Navy Volunteer Reserve
- Rank: Lieutenant
- Commands: HMS X23
- Conflicts: Operation Gambit
- Awards: Distinguished Service Cross

George Butler Honour DSC (10 October 1918 – 16 May 2002), was a British submariner during the Second World War. Honour was captain of HMS X23, one of the X-Craft (midget submarines) responsible for guiding landing craft on during Operation Neptune (part of the Normandy landings). His particular role was to aid the navigation of ships heading for one of the British invasion areas, codenamed Sword.

== Early life ==
Honour was born on 10 October 1918 in Bristol, England. Honour joined the Royal Navy when war broke out in 1939, serving in small ships in the Mediterranean. He married Naomi Celia Coles, a lieutenant in the Women's Royal Naval Service.

== Second World War ==
Honour was a member of the Royal Navy Volunteer Reserve. During the Second World War, Honour served in Operation Gambit which was part of Operation Neptune (Normandy Landings). During the operation, X20 and X23 acted as lightships to help the D-Day invasion fleet land on the correct beaches (Operation Gambit), as part of the Combined Operations Pilotage Parties (COPP). Setting out on 2 June, HMS X20 and HMS X23, captained by Honour, arrived in position on 4 June. Due to the delay caused by bad weather, they were ordered to remain in position until 4:30 a.m. on 6 June (D-Day) when they finally surfaced before erecting the navigational aids, an 18-foot telescopic mast with a light shining to seaward, a radio beacon and echo sounder, tapping out a message for the minelayers approaching the Sword landing area.

== Awards ==
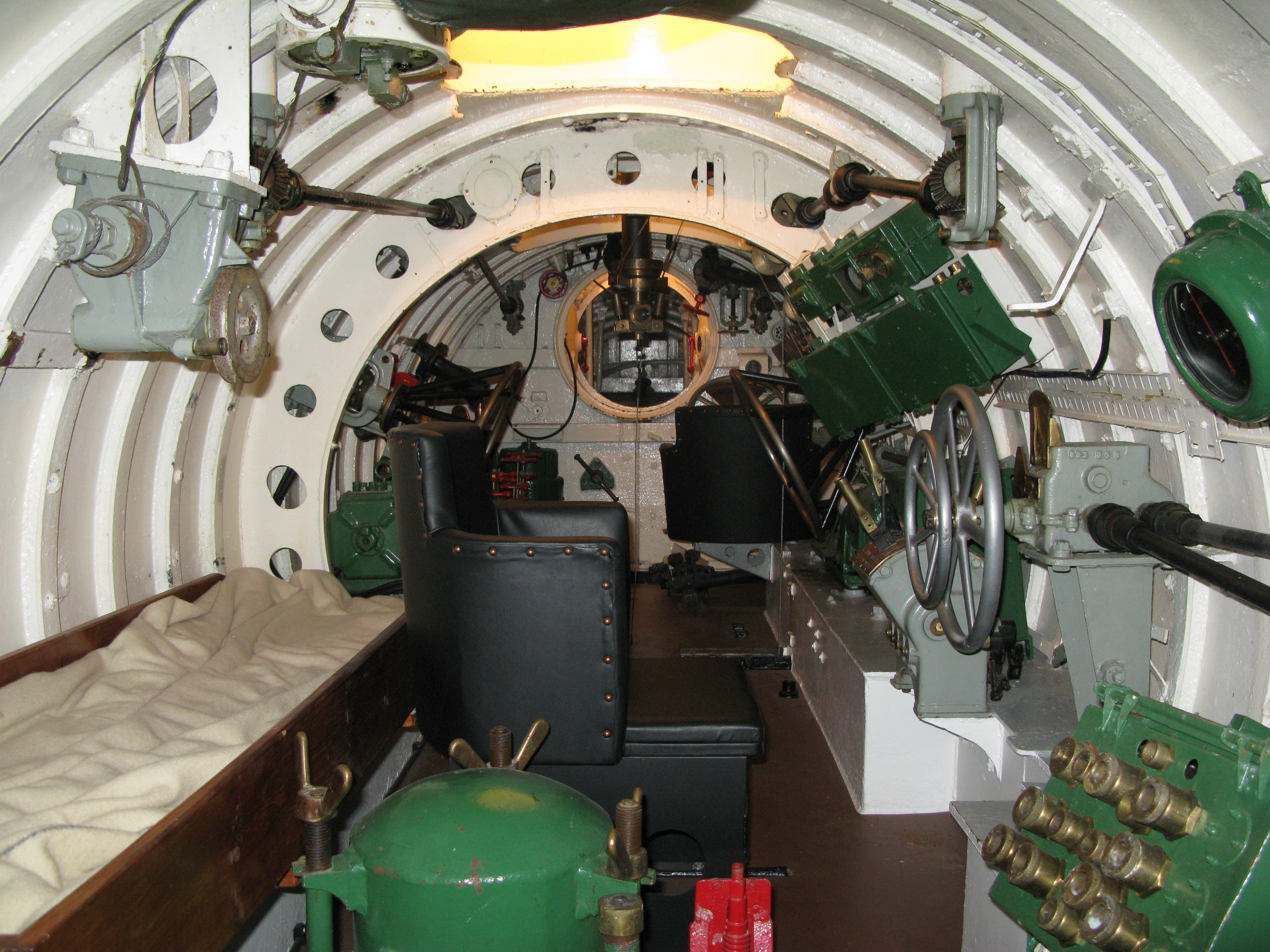
The interior of X24, a surviving boat of the type captained by Honour

- 28 November 1944 - Temporary Lieutenant George Butler Honour, RNVR, is awarded the Distinguished Service Cross for gallantry, skill, determination and undaunted devotion to duty during the landings of Allied Forces on the coast of Normandy.
