= United States Marine Air-Ground Task Force Reconnaissance =

United States Marine Corps Reconnaissance Battalion

The reconnaissance mission within the United States Marine Corps is divided into two distinct but complementary aspects, Marine Division Recon and Force Reconnaissance.

The United States Marine Corps Reconnaissance Battalions (or commonly called Marine Division Recon) are the reconnaissance assets of Marine Air-Ground Task Force (MAGTF) that provide division-level ground and amphibious reconnaissance to the Ground Combat Element within the United States Marine Corps. Division reconnaissance teams are employed to observe and report on enemy activity and other information of military significance in close operations. Their capabilities are similar to those of Force Recon, but do not normally insert by parachute, and provide limited direct action, whereas Force Reconnaissance companies perform both deep reconnaissance and direct action operations. Some of these missions are shared by Marine Special Operations Teams, a subordinate part of Marine Special Operations Command (MARSOC).

== History of MAGTF Reconnaissance ==
=== The formation of a doctrine ===
At the turn of the 20th century, amphibious reconnaissance as we know it today in the United States Fleet Marine Force (FMF), was first conceived by a Marine officer, then-Major Dion Williams, who formulated the first official (maritime) naval doctrine concerning intelligence gathering for planning of operations; in theaters of amphibious warfare.

In order to prepare intelligent plans for the attack or defense of a harbor or bay, it is necessary to have at hand a comprehensive description of the hydrographic features and accurate charts showing the depths of water at all points, the reefs, rocks, shoals, and peculiar currents which constitute dangers to navigation, and the tributary streams and channels which may form avenues of attack or furnish anchorages for a portion of the floating defenses or auxiliaries of the defenders.

— Brigadier General Dion Williams, USMC; Naval Reconnaissance (1906)

Williams' doctrine outlined a wide spectrum of reconnaissance, which consisted of:

- range determination
- topography (configuration of the ground [cities, towns, roads, trails, railroads])
- hydrographic survey of rivers and canals
- telegraph cables/lines and wireless telegraphy
- resources (coal, repair facilities, land transportation, electric plants, food supplies, water supply, and hospitals)
- conditions of the harbor and harbor steamers, wharves, docks, water service
- the population (secret service, professions and occupations, naval and military forces)
- existing defenses (location, form and description, armament, field-works, mines/mine fields, searchlights, plans and sketches, available garrisons and strength of forces, avenues of attack, adaptability of the defenses)

He specified in his thesis that these Marines particularly needed to be competent in surveying, cartography, and recording observations, as well as reading previous maps and surveys of various types.

…talented and experienced men should be assigned to this work, listing among the requisite qualities a thorough technical knowledge, a quick and energetic nature to ensure the work is accomplished without unnecessary delay, a sufficient resourcefulness to overcome unexpected obstacles, a reticence to ensure results are kept confidential, and above all, exactitude of work.

— Brigadier General Dion Williams, USMC (1906), Naval Reconnaissance

Although there was very little effect in creating a formidable unit because the outset of World War I and the Gallipoli Operations due to the lack of Marine Corp personnel by the Isolationism of 1920-1930s. Also drawbacks concurred while most of the Marine forces were engaged in conflicts of China and Nicaragua.

After World War I, three significant aspects of the second edition of Williams' Naval Reconnaissance included:

1. discussion of additional capabilities of observation from airplanes and submarines
2. promulgation of the book under authority of the Secretary of the Navy instead of under the auspices of the President of the Naval War College
3. emphasis on information acquisition for long-term planning.

It was this latter emphasis on obtaining information long before hostilities that was perhaps of greatest significance. Rather than obtaining information solely for military operations in progress, Williams now enunciated a more comprehensive mission.

The object of the naval reconnaissance of any given locality is to acquire all of the information concerning the sea, land, air and material resources of that locality, with a view to its use by the Navy in peace and war, and to record this information that it may be most readily available for: the preparation of plans for the occupation of the locality as a temporary or permanent naval base; the preparation of plans for the sea and land defense of the locality when used as such a base; or the preparation of plans for the attack of the locality by sea and land should it be in possession of an enemy.

— Brigadier General Dion Williams, USMC; Naval Reconnaissance (1906)

The earliest activities in amphibious reconnaissance was largely limited in surveying of ports, uncharted islands and adjacent beaches or coastlines. Most of these duties were billeted by senior Naval Intelligence Officers that were prerequisites in topography, hydrography, impermanent construction of fortification with the means of rapid encampment and mobilization of troops to operate in their area.

However, another Marine intel officer and amphibious reconnaissance war prophet, Earl H. Ellis, put most of William's concept to effect years later. After fighting in the trenches in WWI, in 1921, Ellis submitted a request to Headquarters Marine Corps (HQMC) for special intelligence duty in South America and the Pacific, in which he foresaw the built-up of Japanese naval forces that eventually led to the events of World War II; the Director of Naval Intelligence diligently accepted. It was during his special duty that introduced the most profound accounts of Ellis's intelligence reports. He submitted a 30,000 page Top Secret document concerning his detail discussion of local sea, air and the climate, various land terrain types, the native population and economic conditions. He discussed his reports on strategically seizing key islands as forward-operating bases for project naval forces effectively into the area. His time-tables, mobilization projections, and predictions of manpower necessary to seize certain targets. His maritime intelligence reports became paramount years later for the United States maritime forces, during the Pacific campaigns of World War II.

=== Testing the doctrine ===
In the 1920s and 1930s, the Fleet Marine Force (FMF) first tested Williams' conceptual methods of reconnaissance in the fourth series of the Fleet Landing Exercises (FLEX) in the Caribbean; for evaluation in establishing a naval reconnaissance doctrine for the Marine Corps. By 7 December 1933, the Fleet Marine Force was formed at HQMC in Quantico, VA, combining the roles of the Navy and Marine Corps into an integrated maritime (naval) assault force. Shortly after, a new naval doctrine, the Fleet Training Publication 167 was created to ensure long-term purposes.

Although the subsequent tests encompassed more broadly in combined amphibious/ground reconnaissance efforts, its aerial reconnaissance elements cannot be overlooked since aircraft were both tested for direct combat support and reconnaissance. The aviation reconnaissance assets did not see further scrutiny until the outset of the Korean War.

Before World War II, the first radars were developed for anti-aircraft purposes. These were soon followed by fire control radars for ships and coastal artillery batteries. However, it wasn't until decades later that improvements to technology proved that radar systems were capable of locating artillery guns.

=== Patrons of the doctrine ===
==== From 'sea-to-shore' ====
The Marine Corps established its first specialized ground/amphibious reconnaissance unit, the "Observer Group", in 1941, which was formed for the upcoming secretive mission in North Africa (in preparation for Operation Torch)—under the command of Captain James L. Jones Sr. The unit was composed of skilled and highly proficient swimmers from the Army, Navy, and the Marine Corps. Momentarily, the Observer Group was ordered to be decommissioned, but not completely dissolved; the Marine unit was re-institutionalized as the Amphibious Reconnaissance Company. The remaining Army and Navy counterparts formed the "Scouts and Raiders" and continued its deployment to North Africa as planned. The Scouts and Raiders are the predecessor to the Navy Combat Demolition Units (NCDU), which subsequently became the Underwater Demolition Teams—the patrons of the prestigious Navy SEALs.

==== Preliminary—Ground operations ====
The Amphibious Reconnaissance Company (still under command of Capt. James Jones) was directed to report to the joint-Navy and Army's Amphibious Corps, Pacific Fleet (ACPF). The United States Navy controlled many joint units of the Army and the Marine Corps. These units represented the sum total of the amphibious forces of the United States, with the exception of small units of the Fleet Marine Force, which had been trained for amphibious raids. The Amphib Recon Company was tasked to provide preliminary reconnaissance for the force commander of the ACPF.

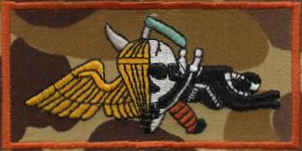
Marine Amphib Recon "Jack" patch

By 1943, the Army ceded their role of amphibious assaults to the Navy and Marine Corps. Subsequently, the Marine subordinate units of the ACPF were re-designated under the full command of the Marine Corps's V Amphibious Corps (VAC)—and the Amphibious Reconnaissance Company shifted alongside under its new command.

In the next following years, the Company increased in manpower and the brevity of upcoming missions, forcing it to be re-designated to full battalion-strength with two active reconnaissance companies; becoming the "Amphibious Reconnaissance Battalion". To include, VAC shifted its command under the Fleet Marine Force.

Prior to the arrival of Marines in this area of the Pacific War, the Australians had already established a network of deep reconnaissance agents known as the Australian Coastwatchers. They operated not only on coasts, but deep in jungles as well. Initially, some Marines became part of the unit.

Although, the force commanders of the VAC weren't the only ones to see the true value of ground and amphibious reconnaissance. The subordinate units of the Marine division and regiments resorted to their own avenues of reconnaissance methods.

The I Marine Amphibious Corps (I MAC) and III Marine Amphibious Corps (III MAC) approached its reconnaissance assets more differently than the V Amphibious Corps's (VAC) Reconnaissance platoons. The amphibious reconnaissance platoons of VAC were more associated to preliminary and amphibious reconnaissance, whereas the division and regimental commanders equated their decision-making process using terrestrial reconnaissance.

==== Reconnaissance-in-force operations ====
In 1941, Lieutenant Colonel William "Wild Bill" Whaling, the executive officer of 5th Marine Regiment, 1st Marine Division, established visualized and perceived the use for specialized missions encompassing reconnaissance at the division-level, which would be conducted above the normal infantry battalion-level in scouting and patrolling. He recommended to General Alexander Vandegrift the need of a special "Scout and Sniper unit" for the 1st Marine Division on Guadalcanal. Soon after, each of the three rifle companies that were used during the Guadalcanal campaign were tasked in sending one their best field craft Marines to devise the scout-sniper unit, with each regiment containing a Scout and Sniper Platoon, within the regimental headquarters and service company.

Momentarily, the regiments requested their scouts to be heavily reinforced with tanks for rapid mobility and increased firepower, to allow their scouting parties to determine a hasty, yet accurate account of their enemies potential and strengths—using a technique known as reconnaissance-in-force (RIF). RIF elicits determination of strength by offensively provoking the enemy for a reaction.

The close of World War II discontinued the use of amphibious reconnaissance, and momentarily the Amphibious Reconnaissance Battalion dismantled; all amphibious reconnaissance subsidiaries were under the direct control of the only-remaining division-level reconnaissance assets—ending force-level reconnaissance.

==== Close-distant operations ====
The "Scout (Tank) and Sniper" companies later formed the Division Recon Battalions and Scout Sniper Platoons of today. By early-1980s, the Light Armored Reconnaissance units were formed to provide mechanized reconnaissance-in-force for infantry regiments. The responsibilities of the LAR battalions resemble those of the Scout (Tank) companies of World War II.

It wasn't until the highlight of the Korean War that foresaw the re-establishment of force-level reconnaissance; however, only 2nd Amphibious Reconnaissance Battalion was created (1st Amphib Recon Bn remained inactive-only to be used as for training new amphibious reconnaissance candidates) in support of the Marine task force commanders' effort in pushing the Socialist Chinese forces north, from South Korea.

==== Deep operations ====
The Korean War introduced the new concept of using rotary-wing aircraft to the Marine Corps in combat employment for logistics and rapid troop transport. During the mid-1950s, a recon test platoon from the Marine Corps Test Unit#1 experimented in various parachute insertions for deeper reconnaissance and pathfinding. In 1957, the command staff of the Recon Platoon, MCTU#1 relinquished the command of 1st Amphibious Reconnaissance Battalion and formed the 1st Force Reconnaissance Company.

When the Force Recon companies were established, they allowed the Fleet Marine Force commanders to obtain information quicker than the slower, processed intelligence that was provided by the division recon platoons, which went through each of the battalion's, regiment's, and division's intelligence sections before reaching the force level.

However, like the fate of the Marine Raiders and the Paramarines of World War II, 1st and 2nd Force Reconnaissance companies were disbanded, albeit temporarily, to make way for the Fleet Marine Force's 'first' unconventional asset that was created within the new Marine Special Operations Command (MARSOC). The force reconnaissance companies were replaced under the command of the Marine Division's reconnaissance battalions while maintaining deep reconnaissance and force-oriented reconnaissance under the Fleet Marine Force.

MARSOC absorbs much of the unconventional operations for which Force Recon had been responsible, allowing the force recon platoons to fully exercise their initial role of providing deep and preliminary reconnaissance to the Command Element of MAGTF without interference.

==== Signals intelligence operations ====
By 1986, new counter-battery radars were introduced. These radars were able to locate many artillery batteries simultaneously. In latter, the operations in Iraq and Afghanistan requested for a small, counter-mortar radar, given 360 degree coverage and requiring a minimal crew, for use in forward operating bases. In another back to the future step it has also proved possible to add counter-battery software to battlefield airspace surveillance radars.

== MAGTF Security Operations ==
This section incorporates text from the United States Military access site.

Security operations reduces risk to operating Marine forces from unknown avenues that may conflict in any tactical situation; it encompasses surprise attacks from the enemy, counter-intelligence, and deception in the friendly forces' capabilities and intentions. In relation, reconnaissance operations support security operations by providing information on enemy forces, capabilities and intentions, and by denying the enemy information of friendly activities through counter-reconnaissance.

Through succession, security operations are usually integrated with its reconnaissance operations; in which force commanders acquire during offensive, defensive and other tactical operations. It greatly improves their decision-making process due to the collected information that is much needed to develop situational awareness and commander critical information requirements (CCIR).

The CCIR are designed to feed important, time-sensitive information to the commander so he can make a decision that should dramatically affect the battlespace. The CCIR is collectively, a comprehensive list of high-prioritized information in which a force commander identifies as critical. It is much required to influence and facilitate timely information management and the decision-making process that may help dictate successful mission accomplishment. CCIR is divided into two key sub-components: "critical friendly force information" and "priority intelligence requirements".

=== Reconnaissance planning ===
Reconnaissance supports the MAGTF commander's intent and his CCIRs. While contributing to the commander's broad situational awareness and development, reconnaissance assets tailor their efforts to support the specific CCIRs indicated by the commander's intent and subsequent unit intelligence and operations planning. Simultaneously, reconnaissance forces must remain alert to any developments that may cause the commander to reassess that intent.

MAGTF reconnaissance assets are best employed early to support the CCIRs and friendly course of action development and selection. When reconnaissance is initiated early in the planning cycle, planning and execution are driven by the flow of solid, timely information and intelligence. If reconnaissance is delayed, situation development will generally be more uncertain. In this case, planning and execution can either take place in an information vacuum or be driven by the search for such information.

Reconnaissance assets are best employed in general support. Because of the nature of warfare, MAGTF reconnaissance units will most likely be employed in rapidly developing and fluid situations. The main effort may shift quickly from one subordinate element to another. Such situations often require modifications or complete changes in reconnaissance elements’ missions. The MAGTF commander and his staff are usually the most capable of determining the best use of MAGTF reconnaissance assets at any given time, to provide the necessary support, and to integrate the results of reconnaissance information with other intelligence sources. Although placing reconnaissance assets in direct support of some subordinate element or even attaching them to specific units is occasionally appropriate, in general, such support relationships make for inefficient use of specialized reconnaissance forces. Proper planning; the institution of flexible, responsive command and control and intelligence reporting procedures and networks; and clear intelligence reporting and dissemination priorities will ensure that the products of reconnaissance are shared to the maximum benefit of all potential users.

Reconnaissance requires adequate time for detailed planning and preparation. Most reconnaissance focuses on the enemy's activities and intentions to satisfy the commander's need to exploit the enemy's vulnerabilities or to attack his center of gravity. This frequently necessitates operating in and around the enemy's most critical and best defended areas. This normally requires that reconnaissance be conducted over long distances and well in advance of commencement of the operations it will support. These conditions usually dictate specialized methods of transportation, communications and information systems support, combat service support, equipment, and coordination.

== MAGTF Reconnaissance Assets ==
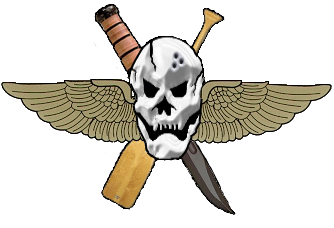
USMC Amphib Recon logo

All Marine Air-Ground Task Force (MAGTF) elements uses its own unique reconnaissance capabilities; the Aviation Combat Element (ACE) utilizes aerial reconnaissance, but the Command Element (CE) and the Ground Combat Element (GCE) operate in combined amphibious/ground reconnaissance.

=== Command Element ===
==== Force Reconnaissance ====
The Force Reconnaissance companies report to the Command Element of the MAGTF. They are used for retaining any information that are held in deep operations under conventional warfare. They are very proficient in various entry and recovery methods in heliborne and waterborne techniques to insert behind enemy lines either by High-Altitude/Low (or High) Opening parachute landings; or combatant diving in submarine surface and subsurface methods. This ensures they achieve and maintain stealth in order to avoid compromising their mission. The Fleet Marine Force's detachable force reconnaissance platoons can operate independently from the support Marine Expeditionary Units if needed, making them special operations capable in forward-operated areas.

Because the division reconnaissance assets are heavily tasked in providing regiment commanders vital information; the force commander's intelligence staff are able to make the necessary preparations or changes in the future, shaping the battlespace. It is mainly due because the division-level intelligence may not be retrieved at a fast pace for adjusting the needs of the force commander. Also, force-level reconnaissance is retained under the direct control of the force commander, enabling him to send his force recon assets at his will. This may include non-reconnaissance avenues, such as direct action operations under the commander's proposal; similar methods performed by special operations forces of USSOCOM.

NOTE: Both 1st and 2nd Force Reconnaissance companies were deactivated in c. 2006. Two platoons from [1st Force Reconnaissance Company] and [2nd Force Recon Company] were moved to 1st and 2nd Reconnaissance Battalions respectively to create a Deep Reconnaissance Company. The deep reconnaissance companies in 1st and 2nd Reconnaissance Battalion were redesignated as Force Reconnaissance Company, I MEF, Force Reconnaissance Company, II MEF and Force Reconnaissance Company, III MEF in 2008, within the 1st, 2nd and 3d Marine Division Reconnaissance Battalions to maintain deep reconnaissance and direct action raid capabilities within I MEF, II MEF and III MEF.

==== Radio Battalion ====
The Radio Reconnaissance Platoons provides ground-based signals intelligence, electronic warfare, communications security monitoring, and special intelligence communications capability to support MAGTF operations. It plans and coordinates the employment of its subordinate elements, to include radio reconnaissance elements beyond the Forward Edge of Battle Area and mobile electronic warfare support system in light armored vehicles. It is the focal point for MAGTF ground-based signals intelligence operations.

==== Remote sensors and imagery interpretation ====
The intelligence battalion provides remote sensor, imagery interpretation, and geospatial [topographic] intelligence (GEOINT) support to MAGTF operations. In addition to the sensor control and management platoon (SCAMP), the force imagery interpretation unit, and the topographic platoon, the intelligence company establishes and mans the MAGTF's surveillance and reconnaissance center. It plans, executes, and monitors MAGTF reconnaissance operations.

==== Counterintelligence and human intelligence ====
The intelligence battalion provides human intelligence (HUMINT), counterintelligence (CI), and interrogator-translator support to MAGTF operations. This support can include screening and interrogation/debriefing of prisoners of war and persons of intelligence interest; conduct of CI force protection source operations; conduct of CI surveys and investigations; preparation of CI estimates and plans; translation of documents; and limited exploitation of captured material. In addition to the specialized CI and interrogator-translator platoons, the company employs task-organized HUMINT Exploitation Teams (HET) in direct support of MAGTF subordinate elements. The HET combine CI specialists and interrogator-translators in one element, thereby providing a unique and comprehensive range of CI/HUMINT services. The U.S. Army is also deriving their own version of HETs, these teams will derive most of their doctrine from the Marine version with a few changes.

=== Ground Combat Element ===
The Ground Combat Element (GCE) has substantial organic reconnaissance support assets. Any units in contact with the enemy, especially patrols, are among the most reliable sources of information.

==== Division Reconnaissance ====
The Marine Corps's Division Reconnaissance conduct reconnaissance in close operations to gather enemy intelligence at the division staff-level. The mission of division reconnaissance is to provide immediate tactical reconnaissance and surveillance (R&S) to the GCE of MAGTF, whether it be amphibious or ground reconnaissance. Division recon, like force reconnaissance, is employed to observe and report on enemy activity and other information of military significance. In current theaters of operation they rely mostly on rapid mobilization via motor transport, traversing ahead of major Marine forces for intelligence contingency for division, regimental, or battalion commanders.

Division reconnaissance mainly do not operate in deep operations, they support the Marine (infantry) regiments by providing and ground reconnaissance to Marine division [or regimental and battalion] commanders within the MAGTF's subordinate MEU; in contrast to force recon who supports the force commanders of the Fleet Marine Force and its subordinate MEF in deep reconnaissance and direct action missions.

==== Counterbattery Radar ====
Counterbattery Radar (CBR) platoons are located within the headquarters battery of the artillery regiment. The CBR Platoon's primary mission is to locate enemy rocket, mortar, and artillery weapons and process all acquired enemy locations in a timely manner for counter-fire and intelligence purposes. Secondary missions that can be assigned by the supported artillery unit are adjusting or registering artillery. They are normally employed as a unit and controlled by the regimental artillery commander. The CBR platoon commander coordinates the employment of radars operating under regimental control. Information on enemy order of battle and locations derived from counter-battery radar detections are reported to the Ground Combat Element and the Command Element of MAGTF.

==== Light Armored Reconnaissance ====
The division Light Armored Reconnaissance battalions provides the Ground Combat Element with its light armored reconnaissance capability by operating in forward areas or along the flanks of Marine ground forces. Initially, they are usually used to provide early warning of contact by hostile forces, acting as the 'mechanized' reconnaissance-in-force, but they are capable of a wide variety of missions due to their inherent mobility and organic firepower; such as quick reaction forces, and counter-insurgency support.

==== Scout-Sniper and Surveillance, Target, and Acquisition ====
Scout Sniper Platoons are organic collection support assets to each infantry battalion. They are highly skilled in marksmanship, reconnaissance and surveillance, and target acquisition. Every Marine Scout Sniper can deliver long-range precision fire on selected targets from concealed positions. Although the platoon can be employed in support of a myriad of tactical missions in defensive and offensive operations, they are primarily employed to provide timely surveillance and tactical data and coordinate supporting arms and close air support. The Scout Sniper Platoon provides the infantry battalion with extended area observation. The Scout Sniper may be attached to the division and FMF reconnaissance companies.

=== Aviation Combat Element ===
The capability of the ACE to observe the battlefield and report in near-real time gives the MAGTF commander a multidimensional capability that should be used at every opportunity. Aviation combat units can view the entire AO in depth, providing early indications and warning and reconnaissance information that can be essential to the success of the MAGTF. Each ACE aircraft (rotary- or fixed-wing), can conduct visual observation of terrain and enemy forces that it may fly over. Given the combined arms capability of the MAGTF, these aircraft can engage enemy targets immediately or direct other supporting arms against the enemy forces. The ACE manages the following reconnaissance systems.

==== Unmanned Aerial Vehicles ====
UAVs provide day-night, real-time imagery reconnaissance, surveillance, and target acquisition. Its unique capabilities can also be used to support real-time target engagement, assisting in the control of fires/supporting arms and maneuver. The UAV provides high quality video imagery for artillery or naval gunfire adjustment, battle damage assessment, and reconnaissance over land or sea. It is capable of both day and night operations using TV or forward-looking infrared cameras. UAV squadrons are under the ADCON of the ACE. The MAGTF commander retains OPCON because of the limited number of UAV assets and the critical reconnaissance capabilities they provide to the entire force. Mission tasking is exercised through the surveillance and reconnaissance center.

==== Advanced Tactical Airborne Reconnaissance System ====
The F/A-18D can be equipped with the advanced tactical airborne reconnaissance system and the Radar Upgrade Phase II with synthetic aperture radar (SAR). The advanced tactical airborne reconnaissance system is a real-time digital package providing day/night, all-weather imagery capability. The imagery collected provides sufficient detail and accuracy to permit delivery of appropriate air and ground weapons, assist with battle damage assessment, and provide tactical commanders with detailed information about the enemy's weapons, units, and disposition. Imagery resulting from collection can be digitally disseminated to the force imagery interpretation unit tactical exploitation group for exploitation, printing, and dissemination.

==== Electronic reconnaissance and warfare ====
Aerial electronic reconnaissance and electronic warfare is conducted using EA-6B aircraft. EA-6B aircraft also process and disseminate information from digital tape recordings obtained during electronic warfare missions to update and maintain enemy electronic order of battle information. The sensors are passive systems that require threat emitters to be active to collect.

=== Combat Service Support Element ===
As the CSSE is often in more direct contact with the indigenous population, it can collect HUMINT unavailable to the other MAGTF elements. For example, medical battalion personnel can often provide information on health conditions and their potential impact on operations. The CSSE is limited in its reconnaissance capabilities, having no dedicated reconnaissance capabilities. However, it can conduct road and route reconnaissance with its convoys, and military police.

Combat engineers are excellent sources of information. These engineer units often conduct Engineer reconnaissance of an area and can provide detailed reporting on lines of communications; i.e., roads, rivers, railroad lines, bridges, and obstacles to maneuver.

==== Amphibious Reconnaissance Corpsman ====
The Amphibious Reconnaissance Corpsmen are Navy combat medics, active members of a division or force recon platoons, that are trained in every aspect in the Marine Corps reconnaissance community. They provide advanced life support skills to casualties that are associated in underwater diving and parachute injuries, and hazards of the maritime and amphibious environments. The independent duty corpsmen (IDC) are assigned to the independently operated FMF Reconnaissance (Force Recon) companies, as the Special Amphibious Reconnaissance Corpsmen (SARCs).

== National and theater assets ==
The MAGTF can draw on the full range of national, theater, joint, other service, and allied reconnaissance assets. When made available, these capabilities will be fully integrated into MAGTF reconnaissance operations; e.g., Joint Surveillance Target Attack Radar System (JSTARS), Navy SEALS or Army signals intelligence aircraft. During forcible entry operations, the MAGTF integrates its amphibious reconnaissance capabilities with national, theater, and special operating forces.

The Marine Corps component will support the MAGTF by monitoring the status of MAGTF reconnaissance requests to national and theater entities. The component coordinates the provision of Marine intelligence liaison to the joint task force and other component intelligence elements to satisfy the MAGTF's requirements. Some MAGTF reconnaissance assets, such as the radio battalion and the CI/HUMINT company, will usually have direct connectivity with appropriate external agencies to coordinate tasking or support.
