= Combined Operations Headquarters =

WWII British War Office department

Coordinates: 52°43′52″N 1°43′23″W

- Combined Operations badge
- Combined Operations Memorial, National Memorial Arboretum

Agency overview
- Formed: 1940; 86 years ago
- Dissolved: 1947; 79 years ago
- Superseding agency: Amphibious Warfare Headquarters
- Jurisdiction: Government of the United Kingdom
- Headquarters: War Office building Whitehall London
- Parent agency: War Office

Combined Operations Headquarters was a department of the British War Office set up during Second World War to harass the Germans on the European continent by means of raids carried out by use of combined naval and army forces.

== History ==
The command used air and naval units to deliver the Commandos to various targets, and then recover them. Thus, it was a combined arms coordination and command structure. Admiral of the Fleet Roger Keyes was the first director, from 17 July 1940 to 27 October 1941. He was replaced first by Lord Louis Mountbatten, who led the command for a year. He in turn was succeeded by Major General Robert Laycock (October 1943 – 1947).

It comprised background staff whose job was to plan operations and to develop ideas and equipment to harass the enemy in any way possible. It also covered all those who worked with landing craft up to and including the landing ships that were used in the various amphibious operations.

The badge of Combined Operations was an Eagle over a submachine gun over an anchor, reflecting the three service arms; the Royal Air Force, the British Army and the Royal Navy. In 1941 the title of Director of Combined Operations was changed to Adviser Combined Operations. In 1942 the title of Adviser Combined Operations was changed to Chief of Combined Operations.

The department existed until 1947 but later re-emerged under a new name in 1951, as the Amphibious Warfare Headquarters.

== Directors of Combined Operations ==
- Admiral of the Fleet Roger Keyes (17 July 1940 to 27 October 1941).

== Adviser Combined Operations ==
- Commodore, Lord Louis Mountbatten (28 October 1941–1942).

== Chiefs of Combined Operations ==
- Commodore, Lord Louis Mountbatten (1942-September 1943).
- Major General Robert Laycock (October 1943 – 1947).

== Operations ==
Operations included:

- Operation Collar (24–25 June 1940) – four raids on the Pas-de-Calais department on the French coast, the first British Commando raid on occupied Europe (just 20 days after the end of the Dunkirk evacuation).
- Operation Claymore (4 March 1941) – the raid on the Lofoten Islands to destroy fish oil factories and stocks.
- Operation Anklet (26-27 December 1941) – a raid on the Lofoten Islands as a diversion for Operation Archery.
- Operation Archery (27 December 1941) – a raid on German positions on the island of Vågsøy to destroy fish oil factories and stocks.
- Project Habakkuk – the development and construction of giant ice ships.
- Operation Postmaster (14 January 1942) – oversaw a Special Operations Executive capture of Axis shipping in neutral Spanish Guinea
- Operation Biting (27–28 February 1942) – the Bruneval raid to capture a Würzburg radar.
- Operation Chariot (28 March 1942) – the St. Nazaire raid to destroy the Normandie dock.
- Operation Barricade (14–15 August 1942) – failed raid on an anti-aircraft gun and radar site north-west of Pointe de Saire
- Operation Jubilee (19 August 1942) – the Dieppe raid.
- Operation Dryad (2–3 September 1942) – raid on the Casquets lighthouse in the Channel Islands
- Operation Pound (7–8 September 1942) – France
- Operation Aquatint (12–13 September 1942) – reconnaissance of Normandy beach
- Operation Freshman (19 November 1942) – Attack on the Vemork Norsk Hydro chemical plant in Telemark.
- Operation Frankton (7–12 December 1942) – the "Cockleshell heroes" attack by canoe on shipping in Bordeaux, France.
- Operation Starkey (September 1943 – 5 November 1943) – a sham invasion of Europe staged to draw the Luftwaffe into battle.
- Operation Postage Able (16-18 January 1944) – X-class submarine reconnaissance of Normandy beaches
- Exercise Tiger (22-28 April 1944) – D-Day training with tragic results.
- Operation Gambit (4-6 June 1944) – the use of X-class submarines to provide navigational aid at Sword and Juno Beaches on D-Day.
- Mulberry harbours – portable harbours for D-Day.
- Operation Pluto – construction of petroleum pipelines underneath the English Channel after D-Day.
- Operation Roast (1–8 April 1945) – operation at Comacchio lagoon, Italy

== Units ==
- Combined Operations Pilotage Parties (COPP) – a unit that surveyed landing sites for invasions, including those of Sicily and Normandy. The unit was made up of members of the Royal Navy, Royal Marines, Corps of Royal Engineers and Special Boat Service.
- Small Scale Raiding Force, also known as "No. 62 Commando".

== Film ==
The Attack on the Iron Coast (film) depicts an account of Allied Combined Operations Headquarters commandos executing a daring raid on the German-occupied French coast during the Second World War.

== Sources ==
- Trenowden, Ian (2012). Stealthily by Night: The Coppists Clandestine Beach Reconnaissance and Operations in World War II. London: Mark Trenowden. ASIN B00AAMH2O0.
