= United States Marine Corps Reconnaissance Training Company =

U.S. Marine Corps unit for training in reconnaissance skills

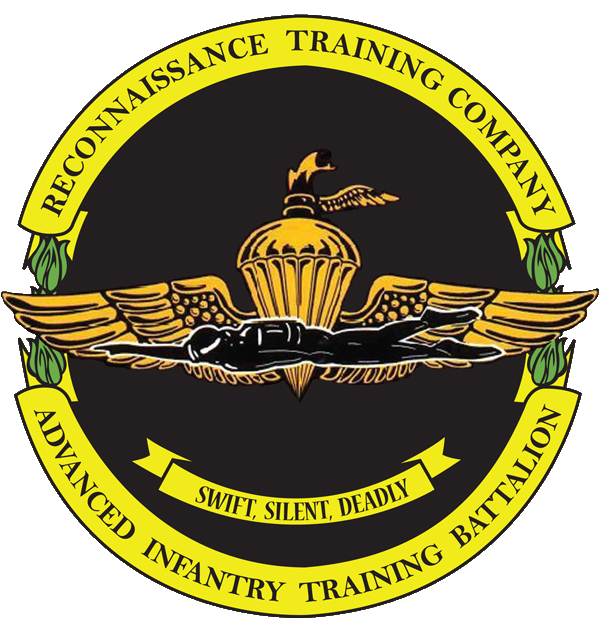
Recon Training Company, SOI (West)

The United States Marine Corps Reconnaissance Training Company trains Marines in the amphibious environment as a Reconnaissance Marine, MOS 0321. It is under the Advanced Infantry Training Battalion (AITB) of the School of Infantry (West), Marine Corps Base Camp Pendleton, California.

== Marines Awaiting Reconnaissance Training (MART) ==
This is the platoon that all junior Marines go to while preparing for RTAP. It is an intensive workout program that develops the Marines to the standards needed to successfully complete RTAP. It also provides manpower for working parties around the RTC barracks and training facilities. Marines in this platoon typically do a pool based workout in the morning followed by a land based workout in the afternoon. They are supervised by the Instructors, as well as by “Ropers”, i.e. Marines who have completed RTAP but are waiting to pickup with a BRC course.

== Reconnaissance Training and Assessment Program (RTAP) ==
RTAP (formerly known as BRC Primer Course) is a 5 week course (25 training days) designed to select Marines that are physically and mentally able to attend and pass the Basic Reconnaissance Course (BRC). Candidates must pass a Reconnaissance Selection Aptitude Test on day 1 which includes a minimum 8 pullups, crunches, pushups, 3 mile run in maximum time of 22 minutes and 30 seconds and a 500 meter swim in 20 minutes wearing camouflage utilities RTAP focuses the students mental strength and physical fitness on land as well as in the water. Students can expect daily running, swimming and calisthenics required for the Basic Reconnaissance Course. Students receive training and evaluations on knots/management of mountaineering equipment, water survival advanced, combat conditioning, and land navigation practice/test. Any student can Drop on Request (DOR) and will be reassigned usually back to original unit or MOS. All students regardless of rank must attend and complete RTAP prior to attending the Basic Reconnaissance Course.

== Basic Reconnaissance Course (BRC) ==
BRC is a 12 week course (69 training days) with an average training day of 15.5 hours and introduces the students to the amphibious reconnaissance environment. During this tenure, they gain working knowledge of the reconnaissance doctrines, concepts and techniques that emphasize ground and amphibious reconnaissance missions. They also learn the fundamentals of all types of weapons (air, sea, and land) that are employed in supporting arms such as calling and adjusting naval gunfire, artillery, and close air support.

The BRC was relocated in 2007 from the Amphibious Reconnaissance Schools (ARS) on Fort Story at Little Creek, Virginia and Expeditionary Warfare Training Group at Coronado, California to the School of Infantry (West) on MCB Camp Pendleton. This facilitated the reconstruction of the course's training protocol and to meet the demands of 600 more recon Marines per year.

Candidates are issued a 12-foot (3.7 m) rope; at any time instructors will demand candidates tie knots of the instructor's choice. Due to that practice, the candidates are often known as "ropers". The term "ropers" was borrowed from the Reconnaissance Indoctrination Platoon (indoc platoon) which was dissolved in 2004.

Students practice day and night learning to operate behind enemy lines and how to conduct immediate action drills. Surveillance and reconnaissance skills such as photography with field and underwater cameras are taught along with field sketching and range estimations. In addition, Recon students learn insertion/extraction techniques in Combat Rubber Raiding Craft (CRRC) and Helicopter Rope Suspension Training (HRST).

Even though every Marine has learned to read a map and compass and to patrol beginning in boot camp, BRC training is more in depth to ensure that the candidates will operate efficiently in small 4 to 6 man recon teams. Candidates will need to complete a 12-mile, three-hour march with more than 50-pounds of equipment and an hour long, 1 ¼-mile open-water swim with fins. Upon graduation, Marines receive the 0321 MOS, Reconnaissance Marine. For those Marines who are already qualified as parachutists and combatant divers, particularly recon Marines assigned to Force Reconnaissance companies, the special "B" 0326 MOS, Reconnaissance Marine, Parachutist/Combatant Diver Qualified is assigned.

The course encompasses:

- advanced patrolling
- advanced radio communications
- reporting procedures
- advanced maritime and land navigation
- reconnaissance and surveillance techniques
- Ground and Engineer reconnaissance
- forward observing for artillery
- amphibious and special operations
- coxswain skills
- over-the-horizon (OTH) warfare
