= United States Marine Corps School of Infantry =

Second stage of recruit training for new Marines

The School of Infantry (SOI) is the second stage of initial military training for enlisted United States Marines after recruit training. The ITB (Infantry Training Battalion) now called IMC (Infantry Marine Course) went from a 59-day course to 14 week course. Since the initial training pipeline is divided between coasts, Marines from areas east of the Mississippi River usually graduate from MCRD Parris Island and move on to SOI at SOI East (located at Camp Geiger, a satellite facility of Camp Lejeune in North Carolina), while those from the western half of the nation attend MCRD San Diego and move on to SOI West at the Camp San Onofre area of Camp Pendleton in California. Female Marines are trained at both SOI East and SOI West. The School of Infantry's training mission ensures "Every Marine is, first and foremost, a Rifleman". At SOI, Marines with the Military Occupational Specialty of infantry (0300 occupational field) are trained at the Infantry Training Battalion (ITB), while all non-infantry Marines are trained in basic infantry and combat skills at the Marine Combat Training Battalion (MCT Bn). SOI marks a transition in the professional training of entry-level students from basically trained Marines to combat-ready Marines.

== History ==
Prior to 1953, there was no formal infantry training in the Marine Corps, and all Marines received combat training at recruit training. The Marine Corps established Infantry Training Regiments at Camp Lejeune and Camp Pendleton in that year. Between 1954 and 1966, all Marines received 13 weeks of Boot Camp (Basic Training) and 8 weeks of Infantry Training Regiment (ITR) regardless of their Primary Military Occupational Specialty (MOS), growing out of the philosophy that all Marines are riflemen first. Because of manpower demands for Vietnam, in 1966 Boot Camp training was reduced from 13 weeks to 8 weeks, and ITR was reduced from 8 weeks to 4 weeks. However, by late 1968 these were returned to their 13-week and 8 week lengths, as manpower demands were satisfied by recruiting efforts, as well as by Selective Service inductees volunteering for a Marine Corps option.

In 1971, infantry skills training for non-infantry Marines was folded into recruit training and entailed only 60 training hours. During the late 1970s and through the 1980s, Marines assigned an Infantry MOS went to Infantry Training School, commonly referred to as "ITS". This lasted until the Marine Corps established Marine Combat Training as a 28-day course in 1989 to teach rifleman skills to all male Marines. In 1996, the 2nd Marine Division disbanded Division Schools, passing the role of advanced infantry training to the newly established Advanced Infantry Training Company at the SOI. Prior to 1997, only male Marines were trained at SOI schools; females went directly to their MOS schools.

== Training ==
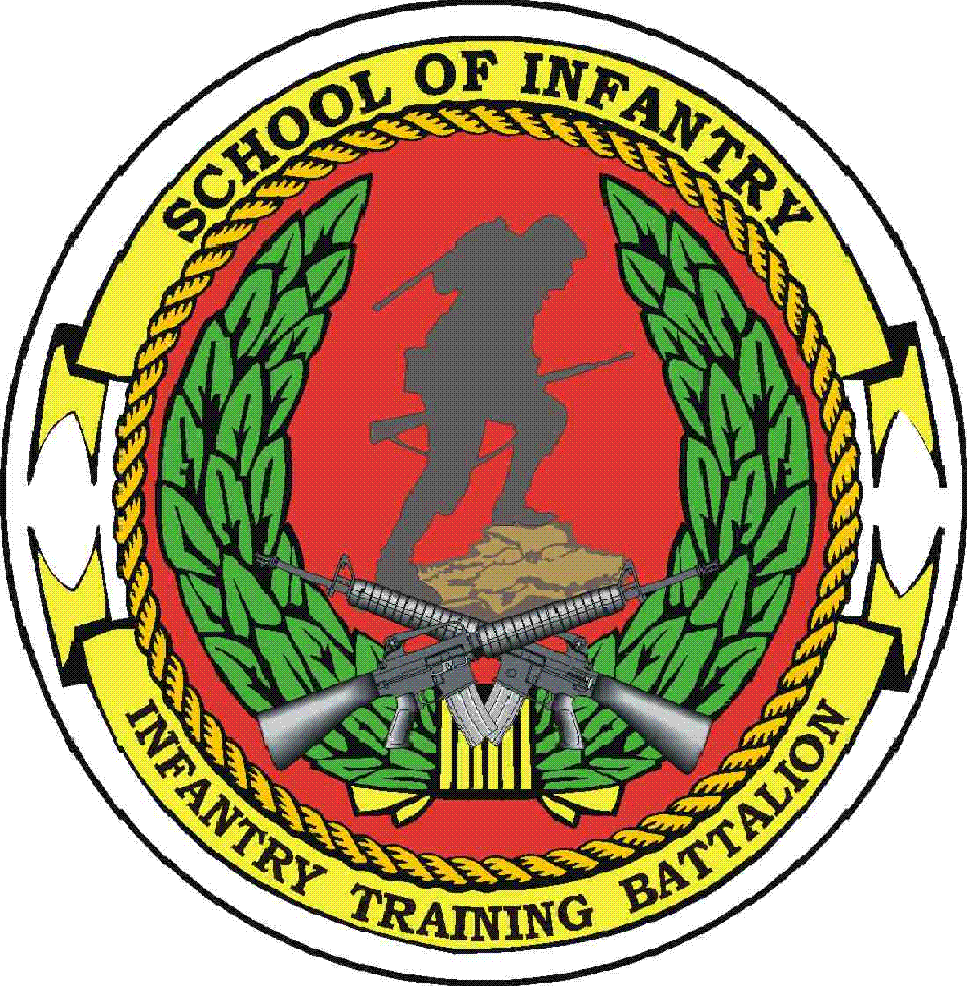
ITB logo

The training is accomplished with a combination of classroom instruction, hands-on practical application, and live-fire experience. The Marine Combat Instructors at SOI provide continuity and consistency in the continuum of training and mentoring entry-level Marines. Also trained at the SOI, these instructors began earning the MOS 0913 (formerly MOS 8513) in 2003.

=== Infantry Training Battalion ===
The Infantry Training Battalion's mission is to train and qualify Marines in entry level infantry military occupational specialties to provide the Operating Forces and Marine Forces Reserve with Marines capable of conducting expeditionary combat operations.

Infantry Training Battalion was a 59-day training course that develops new Marines into infantrymen "who can fight, survive, and win in a combat situation". The first two weeks are a common skills package that all infantry MOSs share, where Marines receive instruction in combat marksmanship, use of grenades, identifying and countering improvised explosive devices, convoy operations, Military Operations in Urban Terrain (MOUT), tactical formations, land navigation, and patrolling. Afterward, Marines receive instruction specific to their infantry MOS, regarding machine guns, mortars, reconnaissance, or anti-tank warfare. The training cycle includes physical conditioning via physical training, conditioning marches, and sustainment training in the Marine Corps Martial Arts Program (MCMAP). Leadership traits and the application of the core values in every aspect of the Marine's life are also emphasized.

Starting in January 2021, the Infantry Training Battalion underwent a restructure of its 59-day training cycle, informally called the Basic Infantry Marine (BIM) Course, to the current 14 week Infantry Marine Course (IMC). This was done in accordance with Force Design 2030, that seeks to have basic entry level Marines trained to a higher level than their BIM cycle counterparts by requiring a ground level course structure for all Marines training for the MOS 0311 and then having a more advance course for Marines training in the MOS 0331, 0341, and 0352. Infantry Marines are not only expected to know the previous skills from the BIM cycle but are now also expected to be entry level trained in the roles of other infantry MOS's and other fieldcraft and demolitions skills. Upon completion of the Infantry Marine Course, Marines earn the MOS 0311 before being sent off to the Fleet Marine Force as an MOS 0311 or continue on to an addition school to be trained in a different MOS in the 0300 Occupational Field. Marines that are designated as MOS 0331, 0341, or 0352 are sent to the Infantry Weapons Course (IWC) to begin training as either a machine gunner, mortarman, or anti-tank guided missleman for an additional 4 weeks of training in those MOS roles.

=== Marine Combat Training ===
Marine Combat Training (MCT) is a 29-day course in which entry-level non-infantry Marines are taught the common skills needed in combat. Marines learn the basics of combat marksmanship, counter-improvised explosive device techniques, how to conduct the defense of a position, convoy operations, combat formations, fireteam assaults, patrolling, MOUT, use of the AN/PRC-119 radio, reporting military intelligence, land navigation, and the use of hand grenades, the M203 grenade launcher, M249 Squad Automatic Weapon, and M240 machine gun. Training also includes combat conditioning by running an obstacle course, conducting marches, physical training, and MCMAP. Upon completion of MCT, the Marine is to have gained the knowledge and ability to operate in a combat environment as a basic rifleman and to perform their primary duties under fire.

=== Advanced Infantry Training Battalion ===
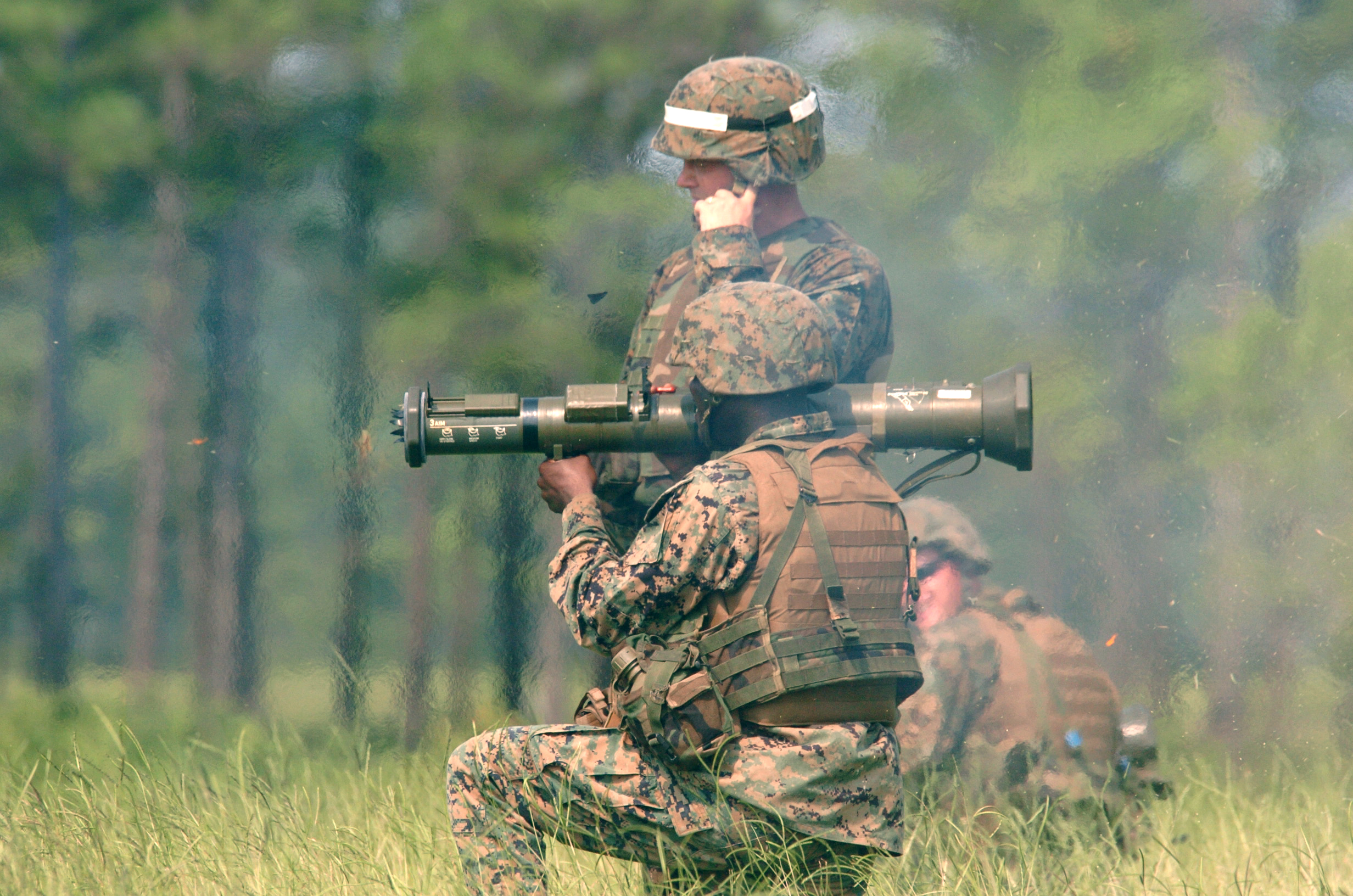
Marines in the Marine Corps Combat Instructor Course fire the AT-4 as part of their training to become the instructors of Marine Combat Training and Infantry Training Battalion.

The Advanced Infantry Training Battalion (AITB) conducts additional training for those infantry Marines who have an MOS other than 0311, as well as advanced skills, MOS validation, leadership, and qualifications to infantry Marines who have advanced in their careers. The east and west coast stations have slightly different subordinate units.

- The Light Armored Vehicle Training Company trains entry-level infantry MOS-qualified Armored Vehicle crewmen and trains infantry officers and SNCOs in the tactical employment of the Light Armored Vehicle, and awards the MOSs 0313 and 0303.
- The Reconnaissance Training Company mentors and safely trains Marines in reconnaissance skills, in preparation for assignment to a reconnaissance unit. Graduates of the Basic Reconnaissance Course are awarded the MOS 0321.
- The Scout Sniper Basic Course provides instruction in advanced marksmanship with the M40A1 sniper rifle and the M82A1A Special Application Scoped Rifle, small bore marksmanship training with the M40, and qualification with the M9 pistol. Instruction includes stalking and concealment techniques, range estimation, observation techniques, hide construction, land navigation, tracking, field communications, selection and occupation of positions, field sketch, observation log, range card, and patrol log construction and maintenance, terrain model construction, and night/thermal imaging device usage and anti-detection techniques. Tactical instruction includes detailed mission planning, preparation and conduct, scout-sniper employment, patrolling, and collecting and reporting information.
- The Infantry Squad Leaders Course is designed to provide Marine Noncommissioned Officers with the required skills and knowledge to be an infantry squad leader. A Marine receives training in rifleman core competencies, war-fighting and decision making, troop leading procedures, advanced land navigation, how to call for indirect fire, small unit training, communications, infantry rifle company crew-served weapons, munitions and pyrotechnics, scouting and patrolling, defensive and offensive tactics and techniques.
- The Infantry Mortars Leaders Course trains Marines to serve as a section leader for the M224 mortar section of an infantry weapons platoon or to serve as a squad leader, plotter, or section leader for an M252 mortar platoon in an infantry weapons company.
- The Infantry Machinegun Leaders Course provides Marines with the knowledge and skills required to serve as a machine gun squad leader for a machine gun section of an infantry weapons platoon, or to serve as a heavy machine gun squad leader, or a heavy machine gun section leader for a heavy machine gun platoon of an infantry weapons company.
- The Infantry Anti-Tank Missileman Leaders Course is designed to provide Marines with the knowledge and skills required to perform as a FGM-148 Javelin squad leader, team leader, and gunner and as an anti-tank missileman squad leader or section leader in an anti-armor platoon or a Combined Anti-Armor Team platoon in an infantry weapons company.
- The Infantry Assaultman Leaders Course provides a Marine with the knowledge and skills required to serve as an assaultman squad leader for an assaultman section of an infantry weapons platoon.
- The Infantry Unit Leaders Training Company provides skill progression training to ensure Staff Noncommissioned Officers are proficient in advanced infantry skills, developed in their decision-making process, making practical use of their infantry experience, and equipped to assume increased levels of responsibility for infantry unit leadership. The course provides instruction in machine gunnery, mortar gunnery, anti-armor operations, Marine Corps leadership, Marine Corps planning process, law of land warfare, anti-terrorism and force protection, written communications, verbal communications, Uniform Code of Military Justice, and personnel administration, section and platoon leadership, platoon/company defensive and offensive tactics, platoon patrolling, and fire support to leaders in the MOSs of 0369, 0302, and 0306.
- The Mobile Training Company conducts "train the trainer", Tactical Small Unit Leader Course, Combat Hunter, and other standards based training as directed to enhance the ability of unit commanders to conduct training that supports their mission.
- Infantry Operations Chief Course is designed to train senior enlisted Marines in the knowledge and skills required to perform the duties of an Infantry Operations Chief in an infantry battalion. Topics that are covered include: training and education in unit training management, ground combat element operations, combat operations center operations, the Marine Corps planning process, fire support coordination, and the Command and Control Personal Computer system.
- Marine Combat Instructors School prepares instructors in the knowledge and skills required to formally train entry-level Marines at the SOI. The Marine receives training in coaching skills for individual and crew served weapons and optics, reinforcement of both day and night land navigation, communications, CPR and first aid procedures, combat marksmanship, the Combat Life Saver program, scouting, patrolling, improvised explosive devices, Guardian Angel, and convoy operations. Graduates of the school receive the MOS 0913.
- The Martial Arts Instructor Course certifies Marines as Martial Arts Instructors (MAI) (secondary MOS 0916, formerly 8551) in the Marine Corps Martial Arts Program by providing the knowledge, skills, and abilities necessary to conduct all aspects of training. The graduating student will have the capability to certify Marines at belt levels the same as their own; supervise sustainment and integration training; conduct the combative sports program; and conduct the combat conditioning program. In order to obtain instructor qualifications for a higher belt, Marines must first meet the belt requirements and progress through the training program. In order to become a Martial Arts Instructor Trainer (MAIT), which can also certify green, brown, and black belt (1st Degree) instructors, they must go through a seven-week MAIT course at Marine Corps Base Quantico. Once the black belt is obtained, Marines can acquire up to six degrees of black belt training, distinguished by Tan (MAI) or Red (MAIT) stripes on the right side of the belt.

== See also ==
- List of United States Marine Corps MOS
