= Camp Geiger =

US Marine Corps base near Jacksonville, North Carolina, USA

- Jacksonville, North Carolina

Site information
- Type: Military Training Base
- Controlled by: USMC

Location
- Coordinates: 34°43′59″N 77°27′15″W

Site history
- Built: 1953
- In use: 1953–present

Garrison information
- Past commanders: Col Timothy S. Mundy
- Garrison: Marine Corps Base Camp Lejeune

Camp Geiger is a United States Marine Corps base. Although not geographically connected, Camp Geiger is part of the Marine Corps Base Camp Lejeune complex, and is home to the United States Marine Corps School of Infantry East for all Marines recruited through the Eastern Recruiting Region. Located off U.S. Route 17 about 10 miles south of Camp Lejeune, it shares the main gate of Marine Corps Air Station New River. It trains approximately 20,000 Marines every year.

== History ==
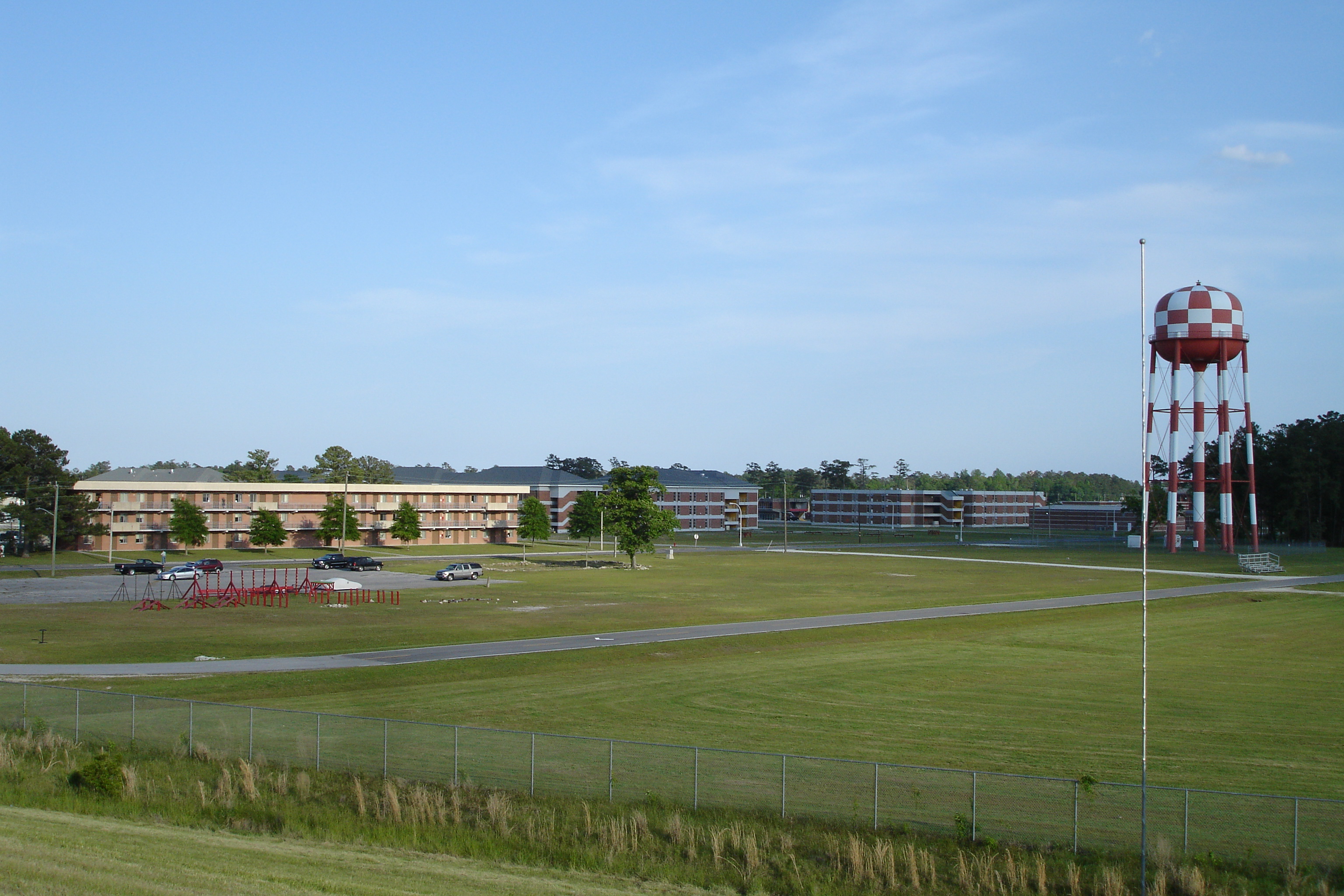
Camp Geiger

Camp Geiger is named in honor of General Roy Geiger, who was a Marine aviator and commander of the I Amphibious Corps, III Amphibious Corps, and the Tenth United States Army during World War II.

== Resident Commands ==
- School of Infantry, East
  - Marine Combat Training Battalion
  - Infantry Training Battalion
  - Headquarters and Support Battalion
  - Advanced Infantry Training Battalion

=== School of Infantry ===
The United States Marine Corps School of Infantry East is the next destination for all Marines trained at Marine Corps Recruit Depot Parris Island. Here, Marines of an infantry Military Occupational Specialty are trained in their specific field during a 59-day course at the Infantry Training Battalion, while non-infantry Marines attend a 29-day course known as Marine Combat Training.

=== Staff Non-Commissioned Officer Academy ===
The Staff Noncommissioned Officer Academy provides advanced leadership training for Marines at every SNCO rank, from Staff Sergeant and up. Additionally, Sergeants are trained at the SNCO Academy, preparation for their appointment to the SNCO ranks.

=== Headquarters and Support Battalion ===
Headquarters and Support Battalion provides administrative and logistical support for the entire School of Infantry and processes all arriving students. Students who report to the School and are awaiting training at Marine Combat Training (MCT) Battalion receive training while assigned to Student Administration Company (SAC), Forming Platoon. Some students awaiting training will be assigned to Camp Guard duty. In addition, Marines who are awaiting separation or medical rehabilitation are assigned to the Medical Rehabilitation Platoon (MRP) or Separations Platoon. During physical rehabilitation of injuries caused during training, Marines attend mandatory sessions with SOI-E Athletic Training.
