= Dion Williams =

United States Marine Corps general (1869–1952

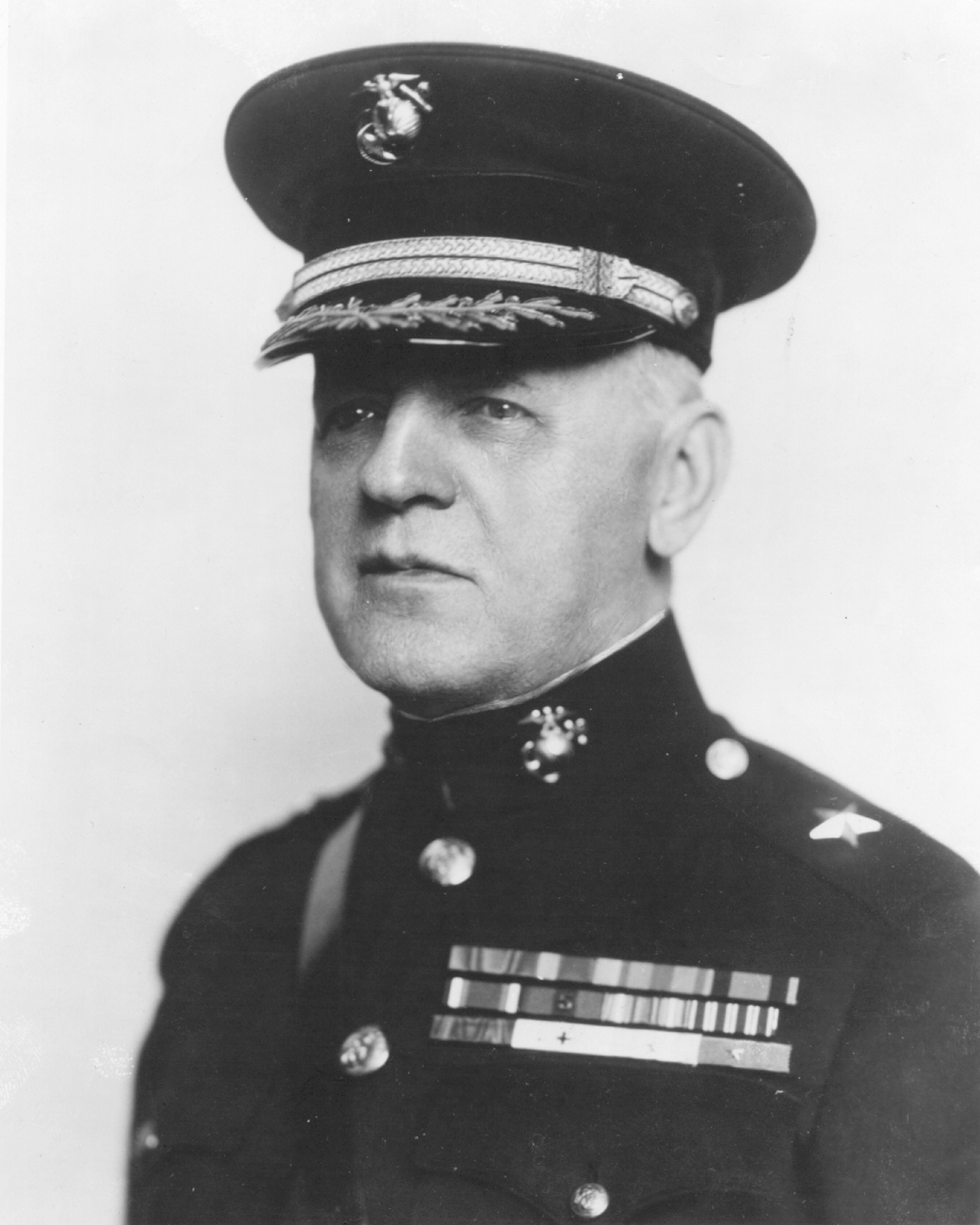
- Brigadier General Dion Williams
- Born: December 18, 1869; Williamsburg, Ohio, U.S.
- Died: December 11, 1952 (aged 82); National Naval Medical Center, Bethesda, Maryland, U.S.
- Burial place: Arlington National Cemetery
- Military career
- Allegiance: United States
- Branch: United States Marine Corps
- Service years: 1893–1934
- Rank: Brigadier General
- Nickname: Father of Marine amphibious reconnaissance
- Commands: 10th Marine Regiment; 2nd Provisional Marine Brigade; 4th Marine Regiment; Assistant Commandant of the Marine Corps
- Conflicts: Spanish–American War: Battle of Manila Bay; Philippine–American War; Banana Wars: Occupation of the Dominican Republic
- Awards: Navy Distinguished Service Medal

Brigadier General Dion Williams (December 15, 1869 – December 11, 1952) was an officer in the United States Marine Corps. He was the sixth assistant commandant of the Marine Corps from August 1, 1925 – July 1, 1928. During his early career, Williams pioneered the first conceptual study of amphibious reconnaissance in the United States and becoming one of the strongest advocates in having the Marine Corps assume the amphibious, expeditionary role. During his career, he fought guerrillas in the Philippines and Dominican Republic during the Spanish–American War.

Williams is credited in the persuasion of Admiral Dewey in 1907 to assert Congress that "a force of 5,000 Marines with a Fleet" would have ensued the Philippine–American War following the Spanish defeat. This 'force' was the first of the doctrinal sequence of the establishment of the Advanced Base Force, its titulage American Expeditionary Force and subsequently its modern namesake, Fleet Marine Force.

Williams retired from the Marine Corps in 1934, spending the rest of his life in Maryland.

== Biography ==
Dion Williams was born in Williamsburg, Ohio, on December 15, 1869.

On June 30, 1891, he graduated from the United States Naval Academy.

After completing the required 2-year sea duty aboard the USS Atlanta as a midshipman, he was commissioned a 2nd Lieutenant in the United States Marine Corps on July 1, 1893. He attended the School of Application before he served at the Marine Barracks, New York, and the Marine Barracks, Mare Island until 1897.

He was married to Helen Mar Ames on February 20, 1895.

He participated in the May 1, 1898 Battle of Manila Bay while serving aboard the USS Baltimore' under Admiral George Dewey. Lt. Williams landed a company of Marines at a Spanish naval arsenal yard at Cavite in the Philippine Islands, securing the naval station, and hoisting the first American flag raised over Spanish soil in the Spanish–American War.

Until 1902, Williams served at Marine Barracks, Charleston. In 1902, he commanded a Marine detachment sent to disarm Colombian troops threatening Americans during the minor revolt in Panama.

For two more years, he served in various engagements of the Philippine–American War. From 1902 to 1904, he was fleet Marine officer of the Atlantic Fleet.

In March 1905, Major Williams reported to the Naval War College for two years. By 1906, Williams wrote a study, Naval Reconnaissance, Instructions for the Reconnaissance of Bays, Harbors, and Adjacent Country, which eventually became the first doctrine in United States history concerning the pertinent missions of amphibious reconnaissance. He focused primarily on the establishment and employment of an assault force specialized in conducting pre-assault reconnaissance. Many of the reconnaissance ideas advanced in his studies surpassed and were eventually incorporated in the 1934 Tentative Manual for Landing Operations.

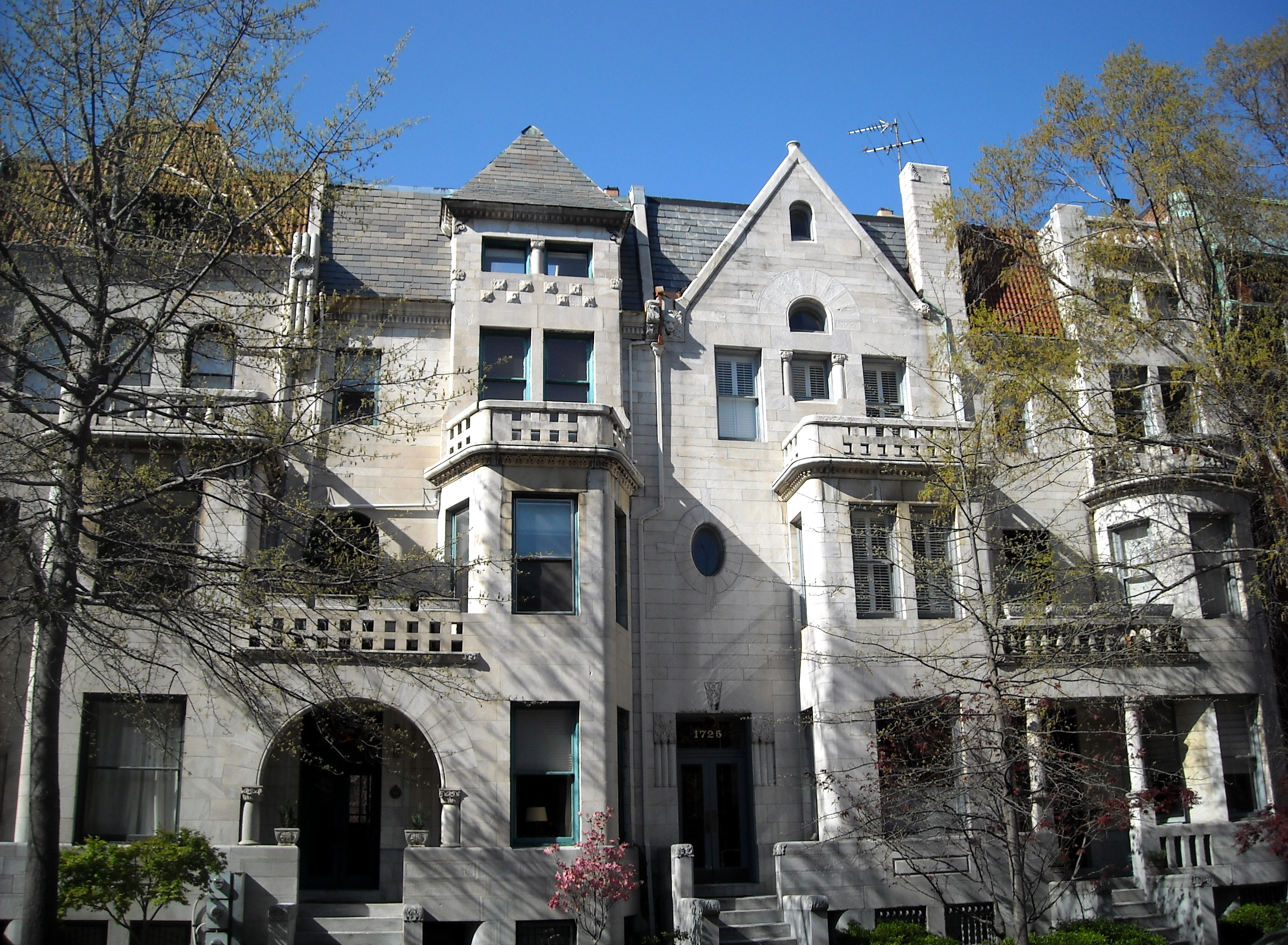
The former Washington, D.C., residence (center) of Dion Williams, while assigned to the Office of Naval Intelligence.

From 1907 to 1909, he was fleet Marine officer of the United States Fleet. From 1909 to 1912, he served on the staff of the Office of Naval Intelligence.

From 1912 to 1915, he commanded the American Legation Guard in Peking, China. From 1915 to 1918, he was Marine Corps representative to the General Board of the Navy. From 1918, he was commanding officer of 10th Marine Regiment at MCB Quantico, where he remained to prepare his regiment for combat duty in France.

Afterwards, Williams became the commanding officer of 2nd Provisional Marine Brigade for pacification duty in the Dominican Republic. Returning to MCB Quantico in 1921, he assumed command of the 4th Marine Brigade as part of the East Coast Expeditionary Force participating in the ongoing advanced base exercises held by the Navy's North Atlantic Fleet on Culebra.

During the 1924 Winter Maneuvers, he witnessed the first use of an experimental "amphibious" tank mounted with a 75-mm gun, as well as the "beetle boats" used as amphibious transports.

From 1925, Williams was assistant to the Marine Commandant. From April 1929 through 1930, General Williams was in command of the Marine Occupation Force in Nicaragua. Until his retirement on January 1, 1934, he was editor of the Marine Corps Gazette while on duty at Headquarters Marine Corps.

After retirement, Williams remained active, authoring several articles on officer professional education and the curriculum at Marine Corps schools, and participating in Marine Corps affairs. In January 1942, he participated in a ceremony at Annapolis, Maryland, where the same flag is now enshrined. It was just after the evacuation of the Cavite Naval Base to the Japanese.

After an illness of several months, died at age 82 at the Naval Medical Center in Bethesda, Maryland, near the District of Columbia. Brigadier General Williams was buried with full military honors on December 15, 1952, in Arlington National Cemetery. He was survived by his widow, Helen.

== See also ==
- Amphibious warfare
- Marine Corps Gazette
