= Amphibious reconnaissance =

Type of reconnaissance

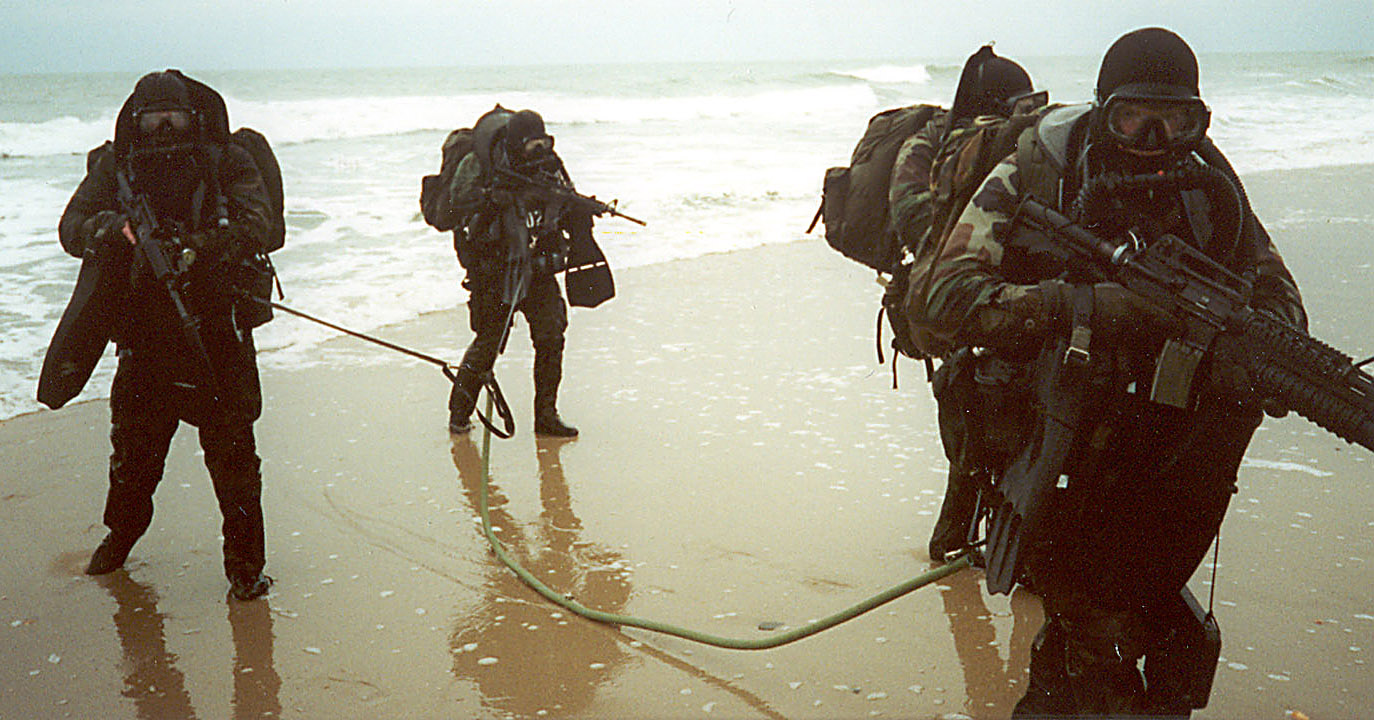
United States Marine Corps amphibious reconnaissance team infiltrates a beachhead

Amphibious reconnaissance consists of ground and naval reconnaissance in the littoral area bordering coastal or ocean areas.

== History ==
=== Evolution of the doctrine ===
At the turn of the 20th century, amphibious reconnaissance was first conceived from an idea from a United States Marine officer by then-Major Dion Williams. Williams referenced the purpose of amphibious reconnaissance by standardizing the 'official' naval doctrine of amphibious reconnaissance of American amphibious warfare in 1906. The scope of the doctrine outlined every aspect that involved recognition of intelligence gathering and planning, the cornerstone of America's present-day methods in amphibious reconnaissance.

By 1933 the Fleet Marine Force was formed at Headquarters Marine Corps at Marine Corps Base Quantico, combining the roles of the United States Navy and United States Marine Corps into an integrated naval assault force. Shortly after, a new doctrine, the Fleet Training Publication 167 was created.

With this new amphibious reconnaissance doctrine, the United States Navy and Marine Corps began to consider establishing reconnaissance units. T Williams had specified in his thesis that "...talented and experienced men should be assigned to this work, listing among the requisite qualities a thorough technical knowledge, a quick and energetic nature to ensure the work is accomplished without unnecessary delay, a sufficient resourcefulness to overcome unexpected obstacles, a reticence to ensure results are kept confidential, and above all, exactitude of work".

These Marines particularly needed to be competent in surveying, cartography, and recording observations, as well as reading previous maps and surveys of various types.

Williams' doctrine outlined a wide spectrum of reconnaissance, which consisted of range determination, topography, configuration of the ground, cities, towns, roads, trails, railroads, telegraph cables, telephone lines, wireless telegraphy, rivers, canals, resources (coal, repair facilities, land transportation, electric plants, food supplies, water supply, and hospitals), conditions of the harbor and harbor steamers, wharves, docks, water service, the population (secret service, professions and occupations, naval and military forces), existing defenses (location, form and description, armament, fieldworks, mines and mine fields, searchlights, plans and sketches, garrisons and forces available, methods of attack, adaptability of the defenses).

In order to prepare intelligent plans for the attack or defense of a harbor or bay, it is necessary to have at hand a comprehensive description of the hydrographic features and accurate charts showing the depths of water at all points, the reefs, rocks, shoals, and peculiar currents which constitute dangers to navigation, and the tributary streams and channels which may form avenues of attack or furnish anchorages for a portion of the floating defenses or auxiliaries of the defenders.

There were three significant aspects of Williams' Naval Reconnaissance: (1) discussion of additional capabilities of observation from airplanes and submarines, (2) promulgation of the book under authority of the Secretary of the Navy instead of under the auspices of the President of the Naval War College, and (3) emphasis on information acquisition for long-term planning. It was this latter emphasis on obtaining information long before hostilities that was perhaps of greatest significance. Rather than obtaining information solely for military operations in progress, Williams now enunciated a more comprehensive mission:

The object of the naval reconnaissance of any given locality is to acquire all of the information concerning the sea, land, air and material resources of that locality, with a view to its use by the Navy in peace and war, and to record this information that it may be most readily available for: the preparation of plans for the occupation of the locality as a temporary or permanent naval base; the preparation of plans for the sea and land defense of the locality when used as such a base; or the preparation of plans for the attack of the locality by sea and land should it be in possession of an enemy.

Twenty years later, another Marine Intelligence Officer, Earl H. Ellis, put most of William's concept to effect. After fighting in the trenches in World War I, Ellis submitted a request to Headquarters Marine Corps for special intelligence duty in South America and the Pacific; the Director of Naval Intelligence accepted. Ellis submitted a 30,000 page Top Secret document concerning the local sea, air and climate, various land terrain types, the native population and economic conditions, reports on strategically seizing key islands as forward-operating bases, time-tables, mobilization projections, and predictions of manpower necessary to seize certain targets.

Most of these duties were billeted by senior Naval Intelligence Officers that were trained in topography, hydrography, and construction of fortifications.

== World War II in Europe ==
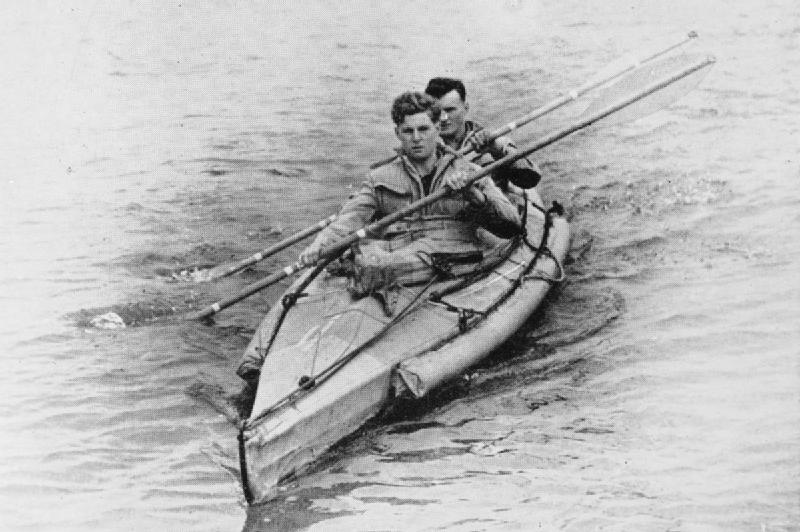
Two canoeists in a COPP (Combined Operations Pilotage Parties) canoe

The development of amphibious reconnaissance in the early stages of the Second World War during the European campaigns were largely dominated by Lt. Commander Nigel Clogstoun-Willmot RN, who developed what would become the Combined Operations Pilotage Parties (COPPs) while conducting raids on the Aegean Islands in 1941. Following Operation Torch, which was carried out without proper reconnaissance, it was proposed that 50 of these parties would be needed; however, the shortage of necessary personnel meant that in all only eleven teams were trained. The Beach Pilotage School was set up on the Kyles of Bute in Scotland.

The COPP Depot was set up in 1943 on Hayling Island based at Hayling Island Sailing Club. In preparation for the invasion of Normandy, the British carried out Operation Postage Able, in which a midget submarine took a team close in to the planned landing sites. The team took samples from the beach to determine its ability to bear vehicles, and, together with depth soundings and other observations, large-scale models of the beaches were constructed to aid planning. In addition, American combat swimmer teams from Naval Combat Demolition Units conducted nighttime reconnaissance on possible landing sites, mapping underwater obstacles and helping to clear obstacles during the invasion.

Following the war, the secrecy surrounding beach recce continued, and mention of the COPPs did not appear in the press until the late 1950s. By then their knowledge and role had been passed on to the (then) Special Boat Squadron.

== See also ==
- Hydrographic survey
