= Close operations =

Close operations are operations that are within the commander's area of operation (AO) in their battlespace (see: Area of responsibility). Most operations that are projected in close areas are usually against hostile forces in immediate contact and are often the decisive actions. It requires speed and mobility to rapidly concentrate overwhelming combat power at the critical time and place and exploit success. Dominated by fire support, the combined elements of the ground and air elements conduct maneuver warfare to enhance the effects of their fires and their ability to maneuver. As they maneuver to gain positions of advantage over the enemy, combined arms forces deliver fires to disrupt the enemy's ability to interfere with that maneuver.

Commanders prioritize fires to weight the main effort and to focus combat power to achieve effects that lead to a decision. The effects of fires can be massed to strike the enemy at the decisive point and time, while reducing the risks to the force entailed in massing maneuver forces at a single point or in a single portion of the battlespace.
