= Operation Postage Able =

Operation Postage Able was an X-class submarine-based Royal Navy operation in preparation for Overlord, the Allied invasion of Nazi-occupied Europe.

== Intelligence gathering ==
The success of Overlord was in part dependent on detailed topographical map information about the beaches and coastal towns along the French coast. British experience of Galipolli in the First World War, with the loss of 100,000 dead or wounded troops, meant that detail was necessary to ensure the invading army did not get stuck on the beach.

Aerial photographs helped identify likely locations but, to obtain more detailed views, the Government asked the BBC to appeal for holiday photographs and picture postcards of unspecified coastal areas of France.

However, as it was known that the beaches were in parts underpinned by ancient forests which had turned into peat bogs before becoming submerged, much more detailed information on the target beaches and their approaches was required. Local conditions such as the composition of the beaches, hidden underwater banks, German defensive obstacles, depth of water, tidal conditions etc. would all be taken into account in the planning of the project.

== Pilot operation ==
On New Year's Eve 1943/4, under the leadership of Major Logan Scott-Bowden of the Royal Engineers, a unit set out in motor torpedo boats to survey Luc-sur-Mer. Transferring to a hydrographical survey craft, they moved closer to shore where Major Logan Scott-Bowden and Sgt Bruce Ogden-Smith swam to the beaches. Collecting samples at designated points, they were careful not to leave behind evidence of their visit, and returned to England the next morning.

On 16 January 1944, X20 planned to spend four days off the French coast. Commanded by Lt K.R. Hudspeth DSC* RANVR and Sub. Lt. B. Enzer RNVR, with the COPP (Combined Ops Pilotage Party) comprising Lt. Cdr. Nigel Willmott DSO DSC RN, and the same divers, Major Scott-Bowden and Sergeant Ogden-Smith.

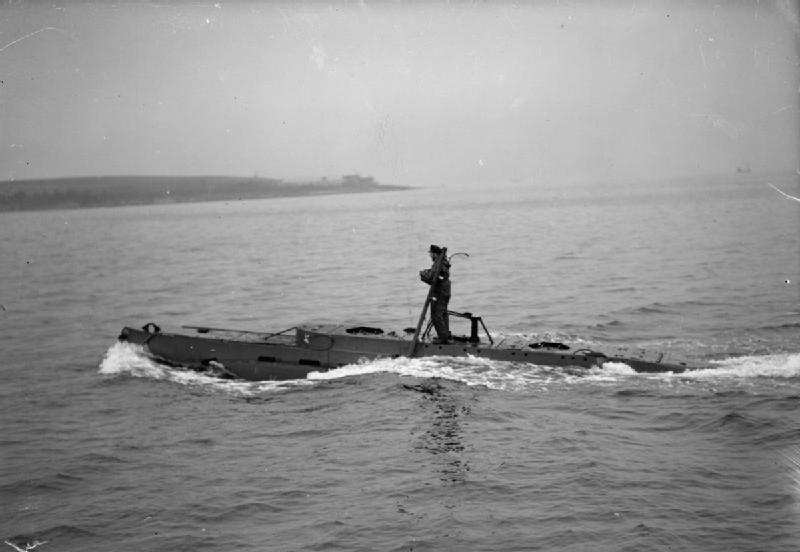
X25 X-class submarine, the type used

During the daytime, periscope-level reconnaissance of the shoreline and echo-soundings were performed. Each night, X20 would approach the beach, and the divers would swim ashore to take soil samples, collected this time in condoms.

The divers went ashore on two nights to survey the beaches at Vierville-sur-Mer, Moulins St Laurent and Colleville-sur-Mer in what became the American Omaha. On the third night, they were due to go ashore off the Orne Estuary (Sword), but by this stage fatigue (the crew and divers had been living on little more than benzedrine tablets) and the worsening weather caused Hudspeth to shorten the operation, returning to HMS Dolphin on 21 January 1944.

As a result of the operation, Hudspeth received a bar to his Distinguished Service Cross.

== Outcomes ==
The allies built two scale models of the landing beaches, one held by the War Department in room 474 of the Metropole Hotel, London, and a duplicate in the Prime Minister's room in the Cabinet War Rooms.

At Cairnryan, just north of Stranraer, south west Scotland, a "life size" reproduction of the beaches was constructed. This allowed the planners to assess the effectiveness of the current landing techniques and the movement of men and machinery over the terrain.
