= Ground reconnaissance =

Ground reconnaissance (also terrestrial reconnaissance, ground recon), is a type of reconnaissance that is employed along the elements of ground warfare. It is the collection of intelligence that strictly involves routes, areas, zones (terrain-oriented); and the enemy (force-oriented). Ground reconnaissance is considered to be the most effective type of reconnaissance but also the slowest method in obtaining information about the terrain and enemy.

Those units in contact with the enemy, especially patrols, are among the most reliable sources of information. Combat engineers are also good sources of information. These engineer units conduct engineer reconnaissance of an area and can provide detailed reporting on lines of communications; i.e., roads, rivers, railroad lines, bridges, and obstacles to maneuver.

== See also ==
- Armoured reconnaissance
- Special reconnaissance
