= Special Operations Training Group =

US Marine Corps training section

The Special Operations Training Group, or SOTG, is a training section of the United States Marine Corps providing Marine Expeditionary Force (MEF) commanders with training facilities and a liaison for Marine Expeditionary Units (MEU). The SOTG provides special operations training for various branches and also participates in the MEUs' Special Operations Capable Certification by acting as the "Training and Evaluation Board" for the exercises and events during the MEU annual training cycles.

== Mission and role ==
The mission of the Special Operations Training Group (SOTG), known in most commands as the Expeditionary Operations Training Group (EOTG), is to train, evaluate, and certify Marine Expeditionary Units (MEUs) and other designated forces in preparation for deployment.

The Expeditionary Operations Training Group leads and evaluates major pre-deployment exercises for Marine Expeditionary Units, such as Realistic Urban Training (RUT) and other work-up events that test a unit’s readiness for combat and contingency operations. During these work-ups, EOTG instructors integrate land-based and maritime training, ranging from direct-action raids and urban warfare to visit-board-search-and-seizure (VBSS) missions, to ensure that all elements of the MEU can operate together effectively before deployment.

In addition to certifying MEUs as Special Operations Capable (SOC) forces, EOTG provides advanced instruction in amphibious warfare, urban operations, reconnaissance, fire support coordination, and small-unit tactics. The group also acts as a liaison between deploying MEUs and higher headquarters, ensuring that training events align with operational requirements and current threat environments.

== Courses and training programs ==
- Applied Explosives Course — This course outlines the discussion of the different compositions and theory of explosives and tamping methods.
- Dynamic Entry Course — Students are taught different methods of explosive breaching. They must have already completed the "Applied Explosives Course".
- Urban Reconnaissance & Surveillance — A course designed to train personnel from FMF and division reconnaissance, Scout Sniper Platoons, Radio Battalions and Radio Reconnaissance Platoons, and company intelligence (S-2) detachments in the conduct of urbanized reconnaissance and surveillance (R&S). The course will cover at a minimum, an introduction to R&S, intelligence considerations, R&S planning, urban route planning and movements, introduction to direct action (DA) operations, evasion-and-escape techniques, surveillance/counter-surveillance techniques and equipment, and urban communication procedures. Training will focus on reconnaissance in support of special operations and conventional missions with specific emphasis on urban operations. This course provides an outstanding opportunity to integrate with the Amphibious Squadron's (PHIBRON) Naval Special Warfare Detachment (NAVSPECWAR Det.)
- Urban Sniper Course — Same as above. This course trains snipers in target, surveillance and acquisition while conducting operations in urbanized areas. It lists discussions in advantages and disadvantages of the built-up environment, to include course of instructions in countersniper techniques.
- Assault Climbers Course —There is a 5 week, 3 phase course that consists of mountaineering skills, mountain physical endurance training, multi-pitch climbs, lead climbs, belaying, rope installations, knots, rappelling, steep earth climbing, and all the necessary knowledge associated with it.
- Dynamic Assault Course — This course is initially designed for enhancing close quarters combat (CQC) skills. Students learn and apply CQC in a low-light environments. It also emphasizes on advanced surgical and precision shooting with the M4 carbine and M1911A1 .45 caliber pistol. Students learn to quickly switch from one weapon to the other during failure drills. They are also introduced to a close quarters battle environment. They are instructed on how to systematically clear a room and navigate through buildings as a team. Participants learn to quickly identify and deal with improvised explosive devices, adversaries and individuals of unknown intent, referred to as unknowns, within the confined spaces of the "Shooting House".
- Security Element Training Course — This course is designed for the Security Element of a Maritime Special Purpose Force, a platoon sized force. It develops the skills necessary for the force to function in support of the Assault Element. The training of this platoon will include limited Close Quarters Battle (CQB) skills, internal security procedures, hostage handling procedures, and other capabilities required to support the assault element.
- Boat Raid Course — The course familiarizes the students with the Combat Rubber Reconnaissance Craft in performing various raid and reconnaissance missions. The training also teaches courses of instructions on how to move from a maritime environments to dry land. Students are required to operate around obstacles in the aquatic course.
- Helicopter Rope Suspension Techniques (HRST) Masters Course — Teaches students on how to rig CH-46E Sea Knights, CH-53 Sea Stallions, UH-60, MV-22 Osprey and UH-1Y Twin Hueys for fast-roping, special purpose insertion/extraction (SPIE), and Rappelling. Students must familiarize with knots and rigging systems (6 in all). Upon mastery of these subjects, students put their new skills to use on towers, and are given a written test to complete.
- Deep Infiltration and Extraction Team (DIET) Course — This course teaches students to make small air/ground units under the SPMAGTF. Only students qualified in HRST, CQC, SPIE, Urban Sniper and masterful command of aircraft and navigation may qualify.
- Tactical Recovery of Aircraft and/or Personnel (TRAP) Course — Course teaches students in the fundamentals of helicopter and subsurface insertions for the recovery of aircraft equipment and personnel, or other sensitive material that is of interest for retrieval.
- Non-Lethal Weapons Course — Students learns skills in utilizing their MCMAP skills in defense and offense of non-lethal weapons.
