= Maritime Special Purpose Force =

United States Marine Corps specialized sub-unit of a Marine expeditionary unit

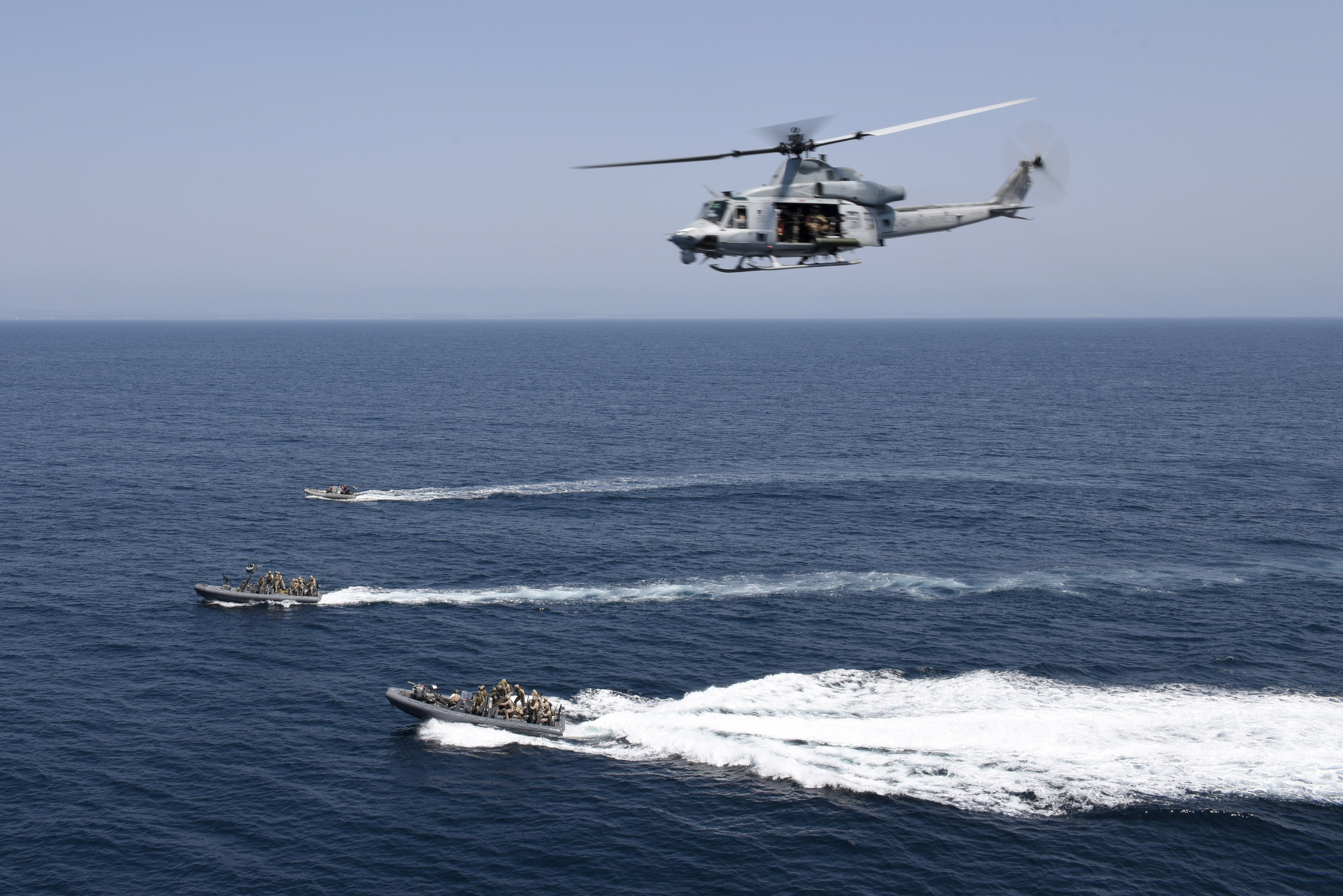
Maritime Raid Force and Naval Special Warfare Task Units conduct a boarding exercise

Maritime Raid Force (26th MEU), conducts a High-altitude, low-opening (HALO) jump

A Maritime Special Purpose Force (MSPF) is a United States Marine Corps specialized sub-unit of a Marine expeditionary unit (special operations capable) (MEU(SOC)). A MSPF is deployed to give the commanders low profile, two-platoon surgical emplacement in the accessible littoral regions. The MSPF provides the enhanced operational capability and precision skills to complement, enable, and execute selected conventional, maritime special operations. They can also perform operations not resident in traditional amphibious raid companies.

The MSPF provides the MEUs with rapid direct action capabilities. They are also responsible for in extremis hostage rescue (IHR) in urban areas.

A MSPF cannot operate independently of its parent MEU(SOC), on which it relies for logistics, intelligence, communications, transportation, and fire support. However, it is capable of conducting operations with, or in support of the operators of the United States special operations forces. The MSPF's task organization is often conformed as an addition of the Amphibious Ready Group’s Naval Special Warfare Task Unit detachment.

From 2013 to 2023, MEU(SOC)s were defunct including the integral MSPF. MEUs had a Maritime Raid Force (MRF) the successor of the MSPF. In July 2023, II Marine Expeditionary Force certified the first MEU(SOC) in over a decade including the integral MSPF.

== Organization ==
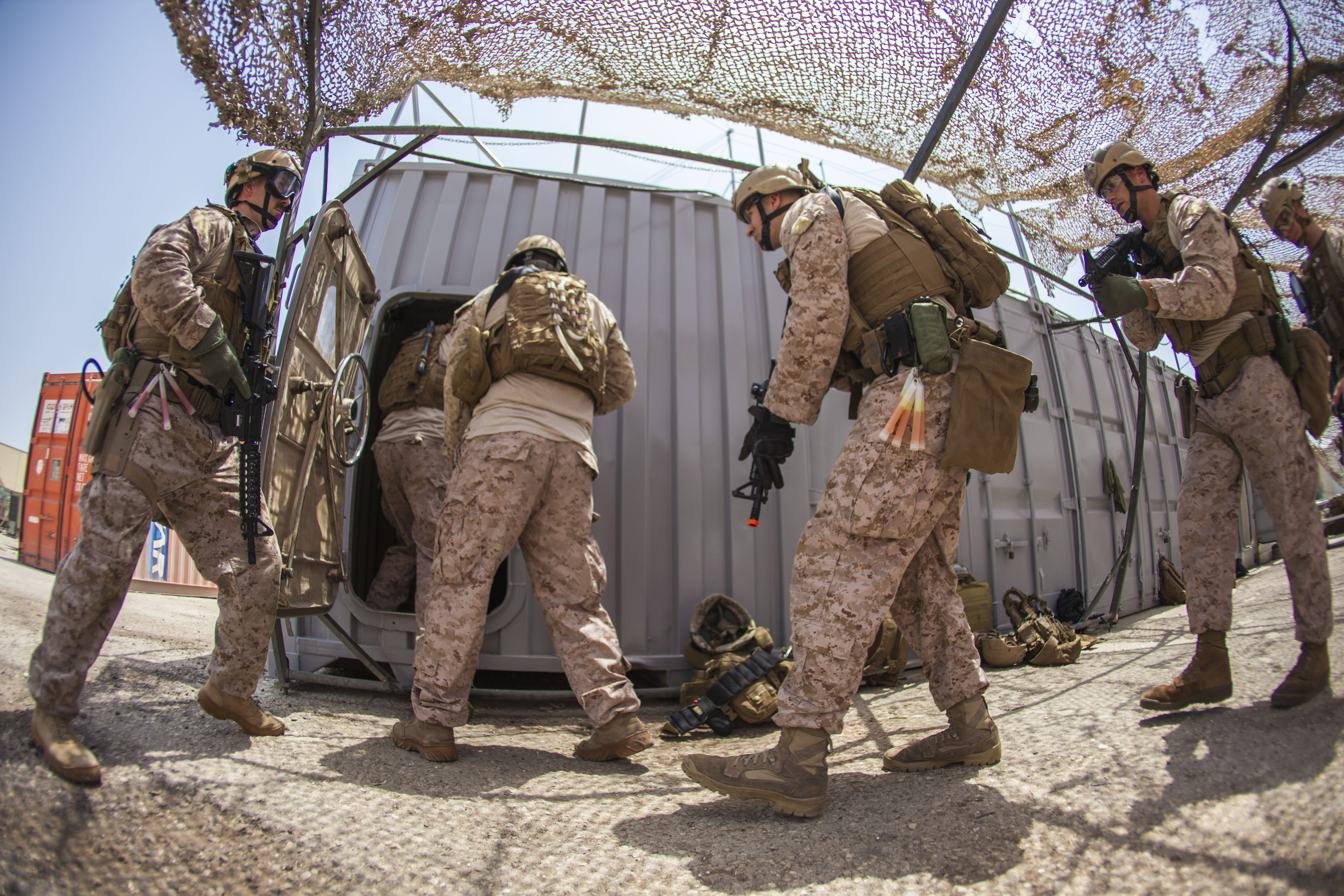
Maritime Raid Force conduct CQB exercises at a U.S. Coast Guard PATFORSWA compound with Deployable Specialized Forces Middle East Training Team

The Maritime Special Purpose Force contains a command element, security element, assault element, and support element. The security element consists of one or more reinforced rifle platoons. The assault element is organized to conduct on-scene command, assault, security, and support functions. The support element is organized to conduct reconnaissance and surveillance, sniper control and support, counter-intelligence, human intelligence (HUMINT), signals intelligence/electronic warfare (SIGINT/EW), and close air support.

=== Command Element ===
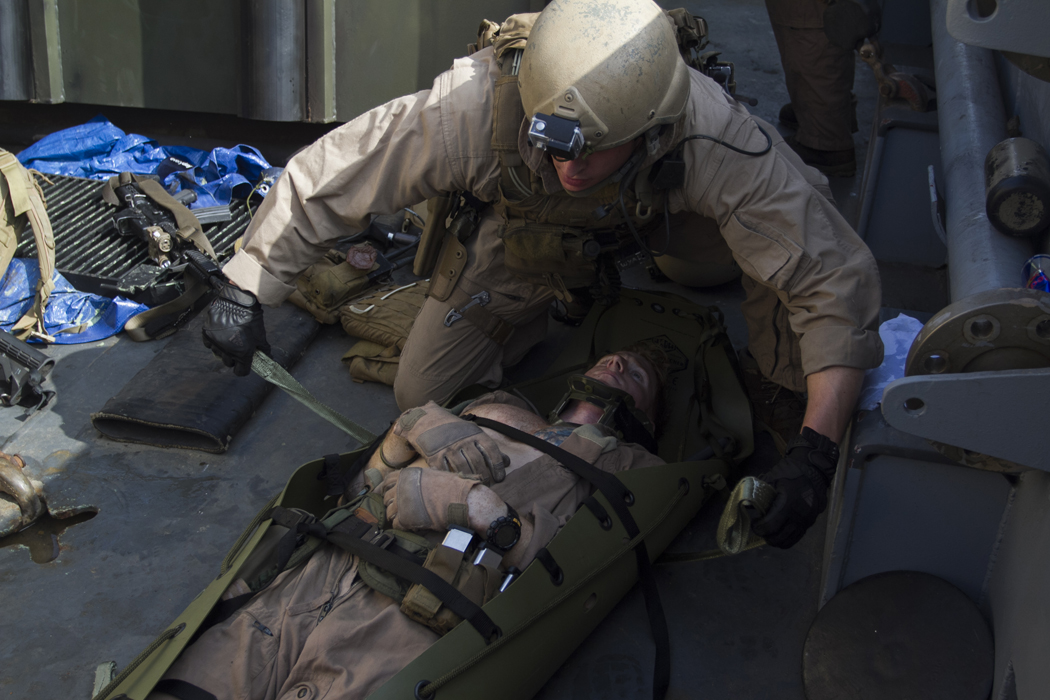
A Special Amphibious Reconnaissance Corpsman with the Maritime Raid Force detachment, provides medical aid to a simulated injured Marine during a visit, board, search, and seizure exercise

The commander of the MSPF is designated by the MEU(SOC) commander. Command and control remains with the MEU(SOC) Commander.

- Commander, MSPF
- Team(s), Communications Detachment
- Team(s), Human Exploitation Team (HET)
- Team(s), Medical Section
- Team(s), Intelligence section from MEU(SOC)

=== Security Element ===
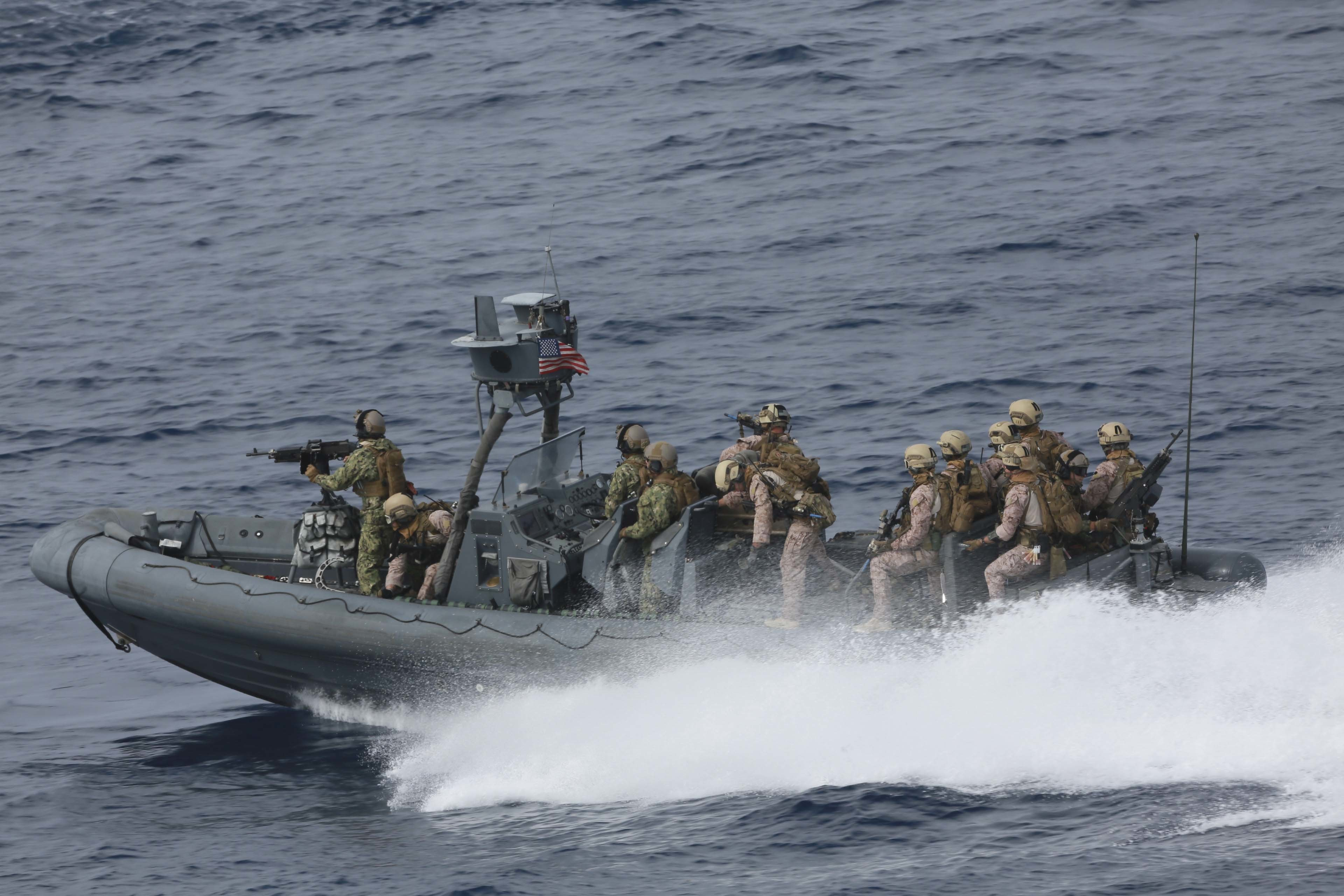
Navy Special warfare combatant-craft crewmen operators man the boat for Maritime Raid Force members to conduct VBSS training

The security element is normally structured around a platoon provided by the Battalion Landing Team (BLT) and may be augmented by the Naval Special Warfare Task Units (NSWTU) embarked within the Amphibious Ready Group. The security element will act as a reinforcing unit, a support unit, a diversionary unit, or an extraction unit.

- Rifle Platoon (-) (reinforced)
- Sea, Air, and Land (SEAL) Strike Platoon, NSWTU, Amphibious Squadron (PHIBRON) (as required)
- Special boat teams Strike Platoon, part of NSWTU, Amphibious Squadron (support element).

=== Assault Element (AE) ===
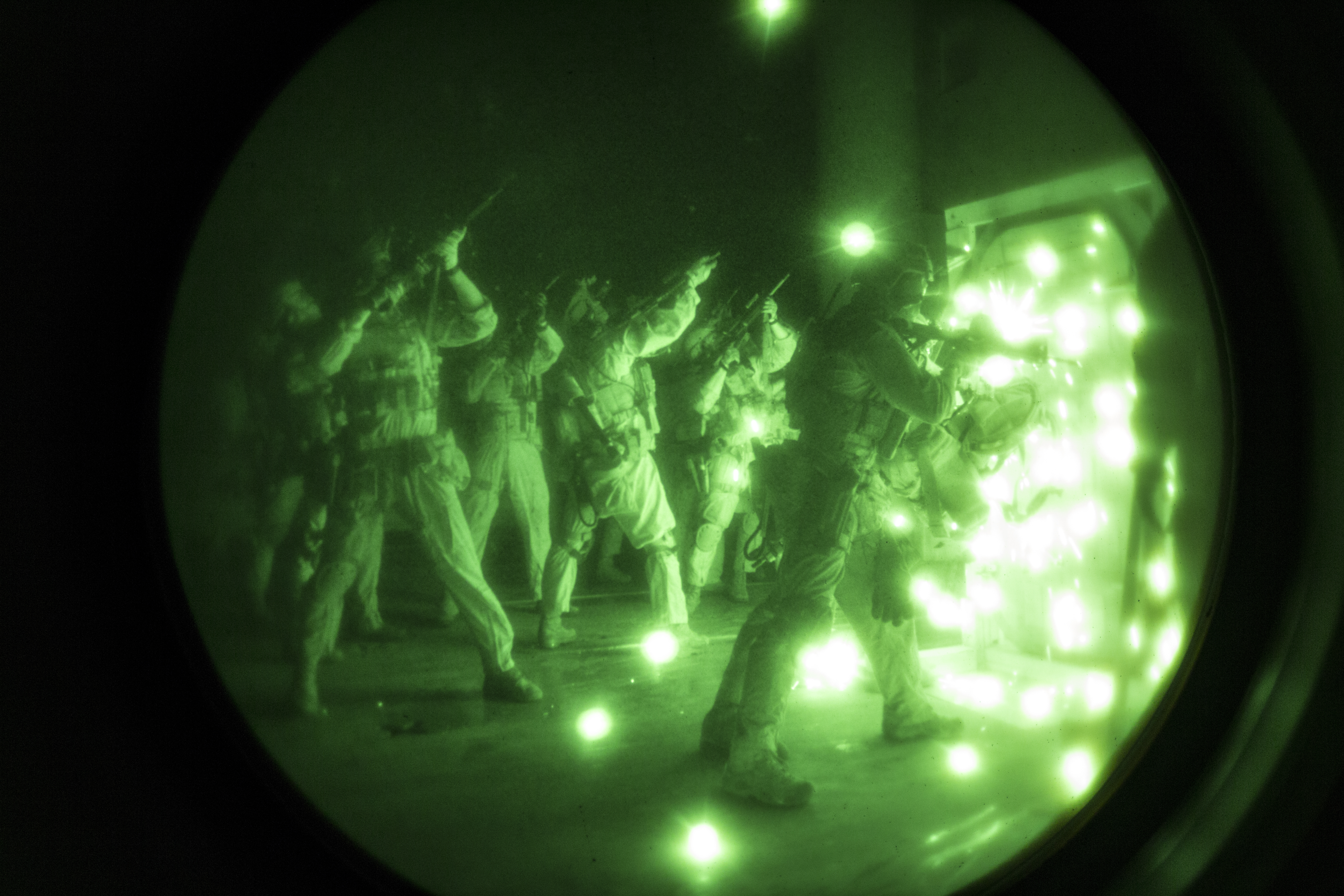
Maritime Raid Force conduct breaching and assault operation aboard ship

The AE is the main effort of the MSPF and is organized to perform assault, explosive breaching, internal security, and sniper functions. The assault function will normally be executed by the Force Recon detachment. Mission-specific augmentation (e.g., additional sniper support, specialized demolitions, explosive ordnance disposal, signals intelligence/electronic warfare (SIGINT/EW), etc.) will be provided from other MEU(SOC) assets or from the NSWTU embarked with the ARG.

- Detachment, Force Recon Direct Action Platoon (DAP)
- Team(s), Security, Fleet Antiterrorism Security Team (FAST) Company
- Team, Explosives Ordnance Disposal (EOD) Detachment
- Team(s), Combat Photo Detachment

=== Reconnaissance and Surveillance Element (R&S) ===
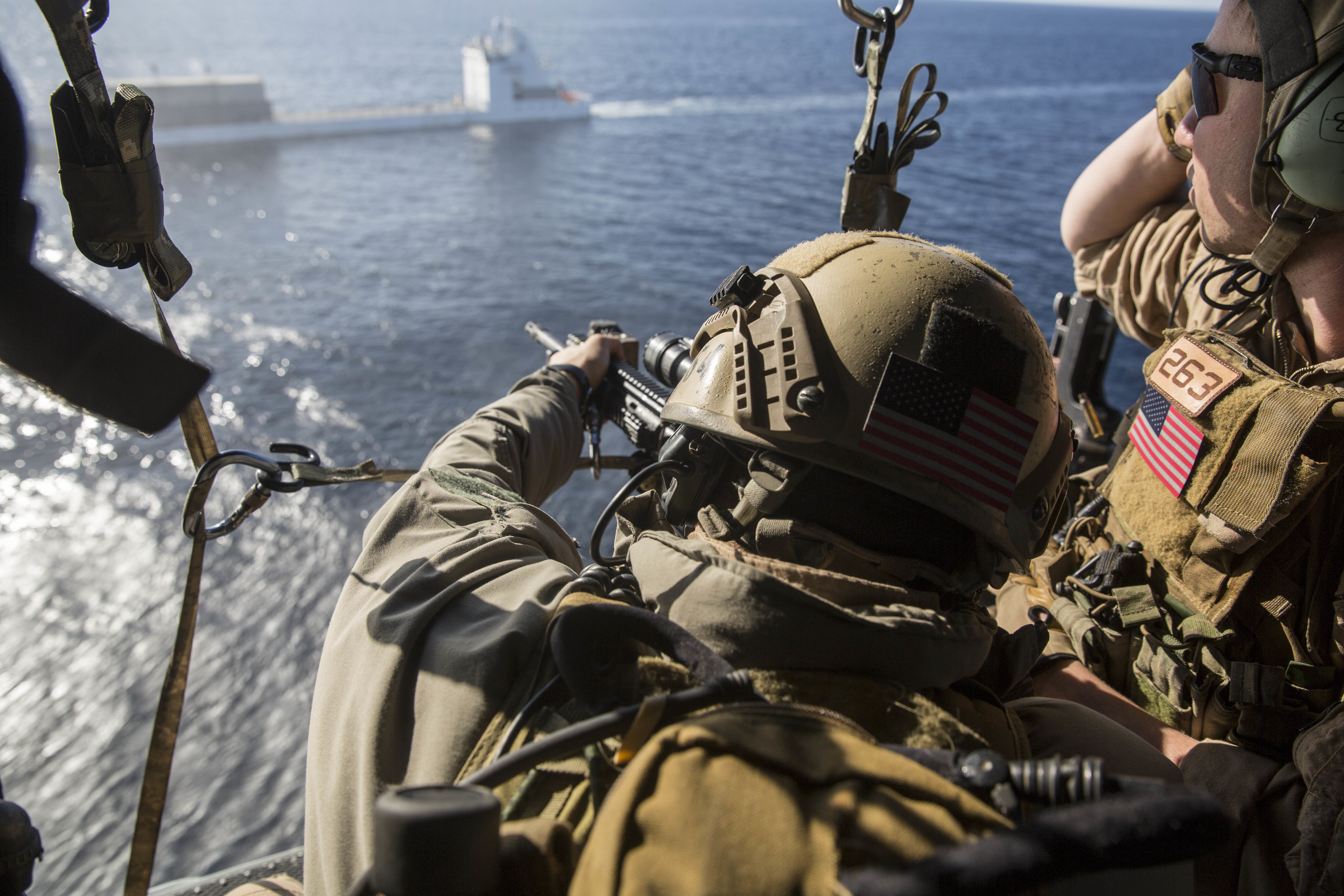
Scout sniper with Maritime Raid Force

The Reconnaissance and Surveillance Element normally consists of the Scout Sniper Platoon from the Battalion Landing Team.

- Team(s), Scout Sniper Platoon
- Team(s), Radio Reconnaissance Team (Signals Intelligence)

NOTE: The Maritime Special Purpose Force are no longer active and have been replaced with the Maritime Raid Force (MRF). The MRF specializes in operations conducted on structures in or near bodies of water. They utilize speed and stealth to take enemy forces by surprise and secure their target. In order to counter the growing threat of piracy, the MEU created the MRF.

=== Support Element ===
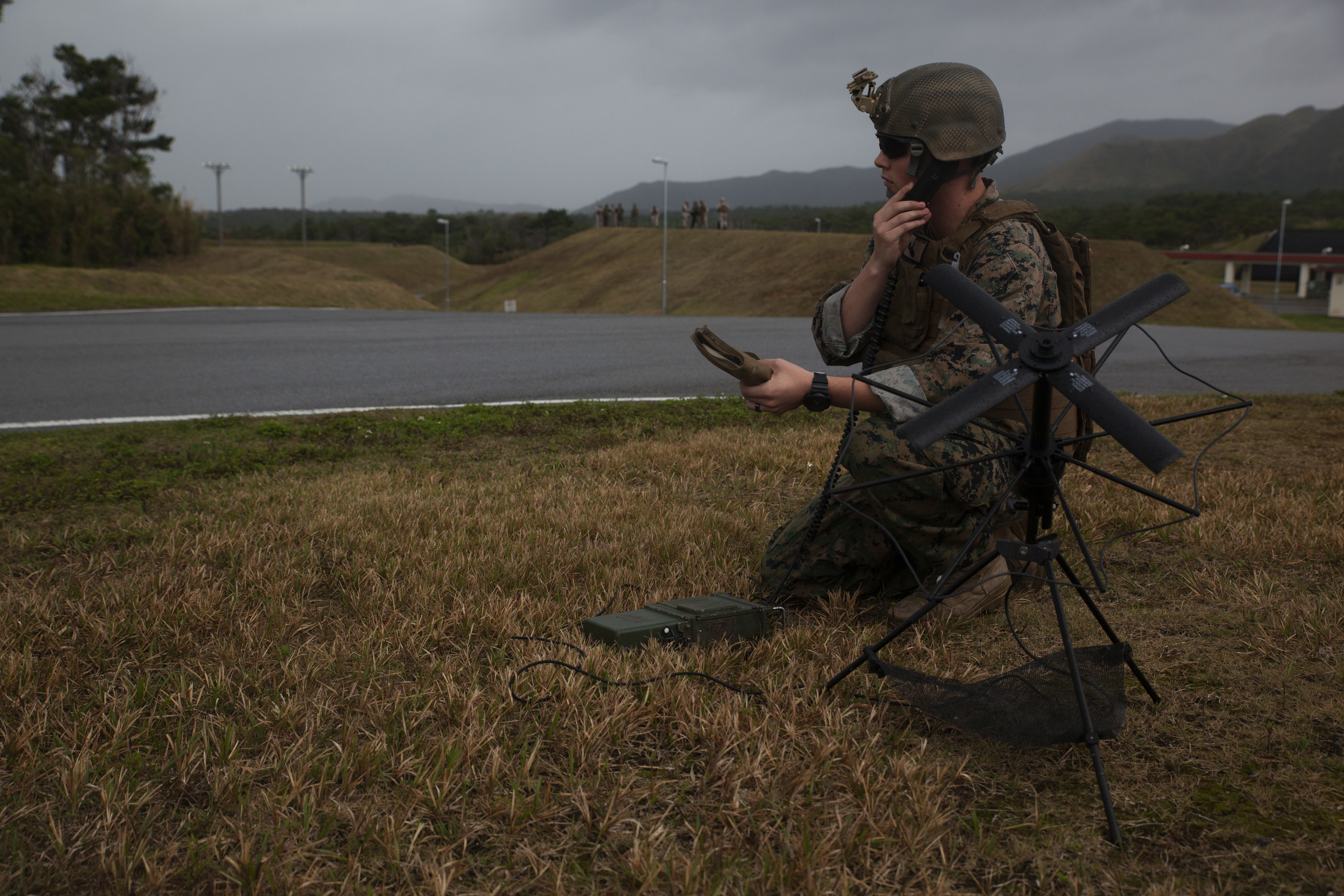
Maritime Raid Force sets up satellite communications and breaches into INTEROP

The support element normally is composed of assets from the BLT Reconnaissance Platoon coupled with elements of the Aviation Combat Element (ACE), Radio Battalion Detachment, Communications Detachment, and HET assets from the MEU(SOC) CE. Additional capability may be provided by the NSWTU embarked with the Amphibious Ready Group.

- Team(s), Reconnaissance
- Team(s), Communications Detachment
- Team(s), Radio Battalion Detachment
- Team(s), HET Detachment
- NSWTU, PHIBRON (as required)
- Aviation Support Element

The aviation support element is a task organized portion of the Marine Air-Ground Task Force's MEU Aviation Combat Element. They are capable of precise night vision flying and navigation, various insertion/extraction means and forward arming and refueling point operations. The specific structure of the aviation support element will vary depending on the lift requirements and distance to the crisis site.

== Gallery ==
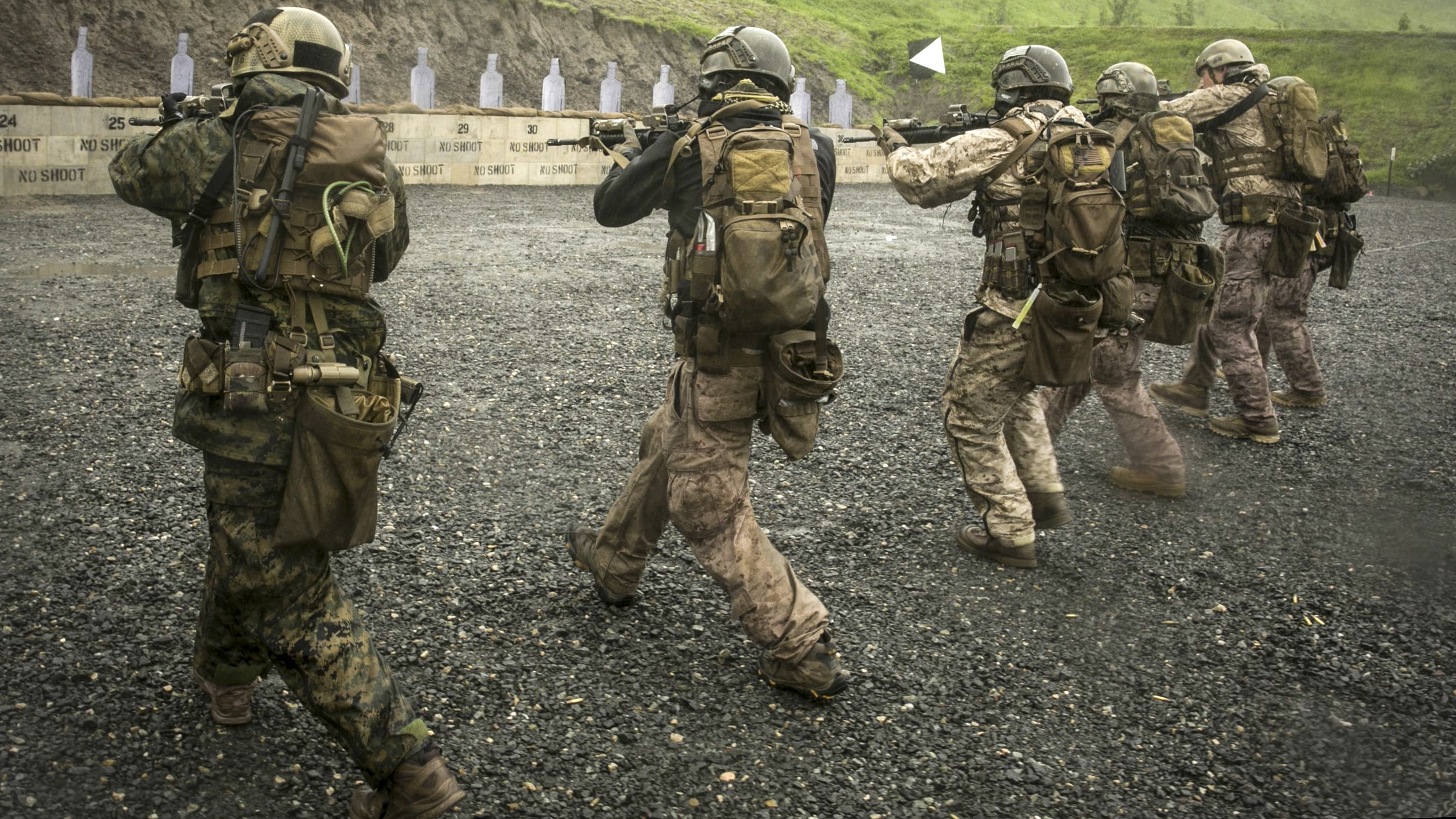
Marines with 15th Marine Expeditionary Unit’s Maritime Raid Force hone their skills on the move during precision marksmanship training at Camp

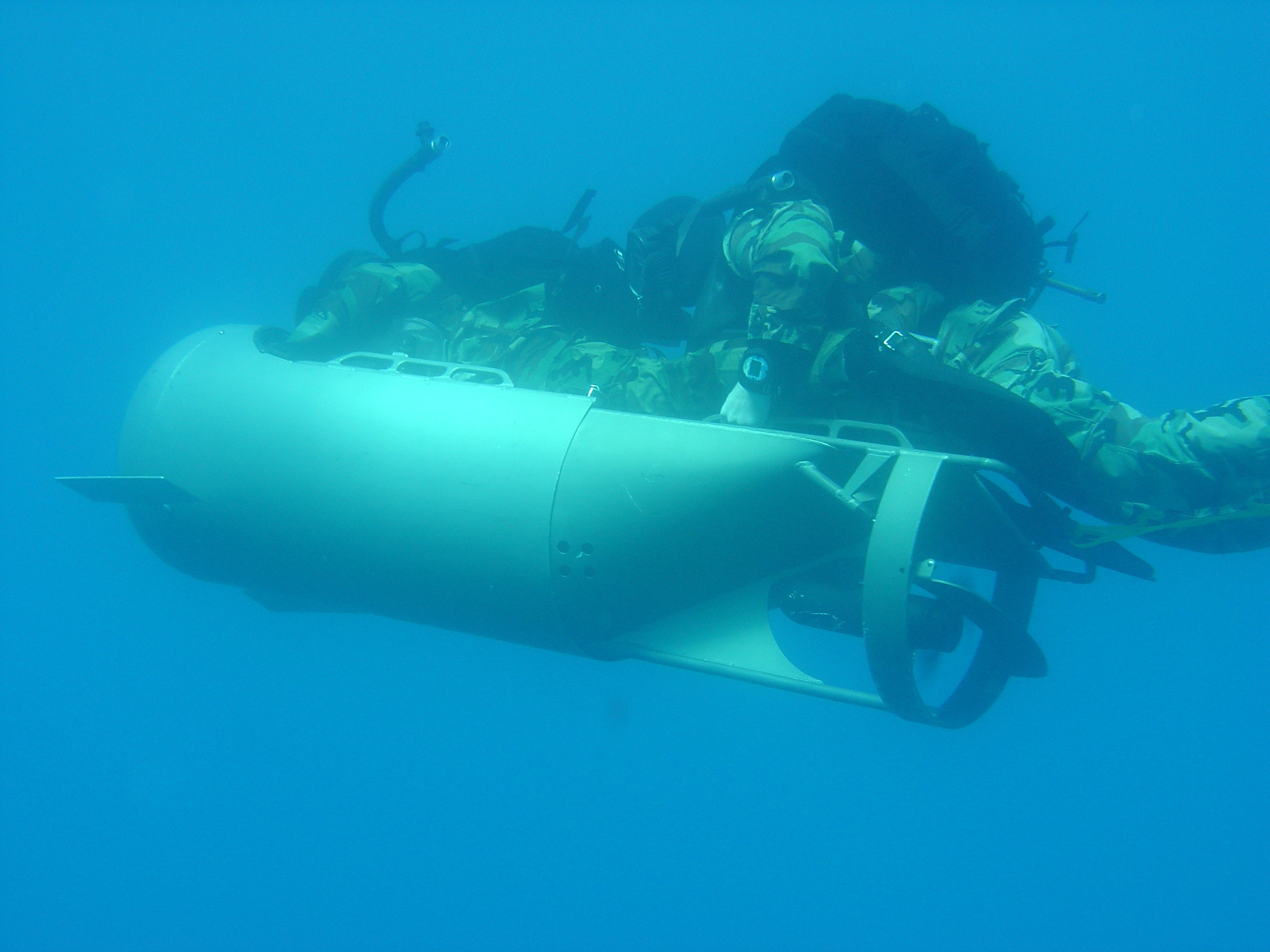
Two U.S. Marines of the MSPF operating a Diver Propulsion Device (DPD) used for stealthy approaches. [circa 1999]

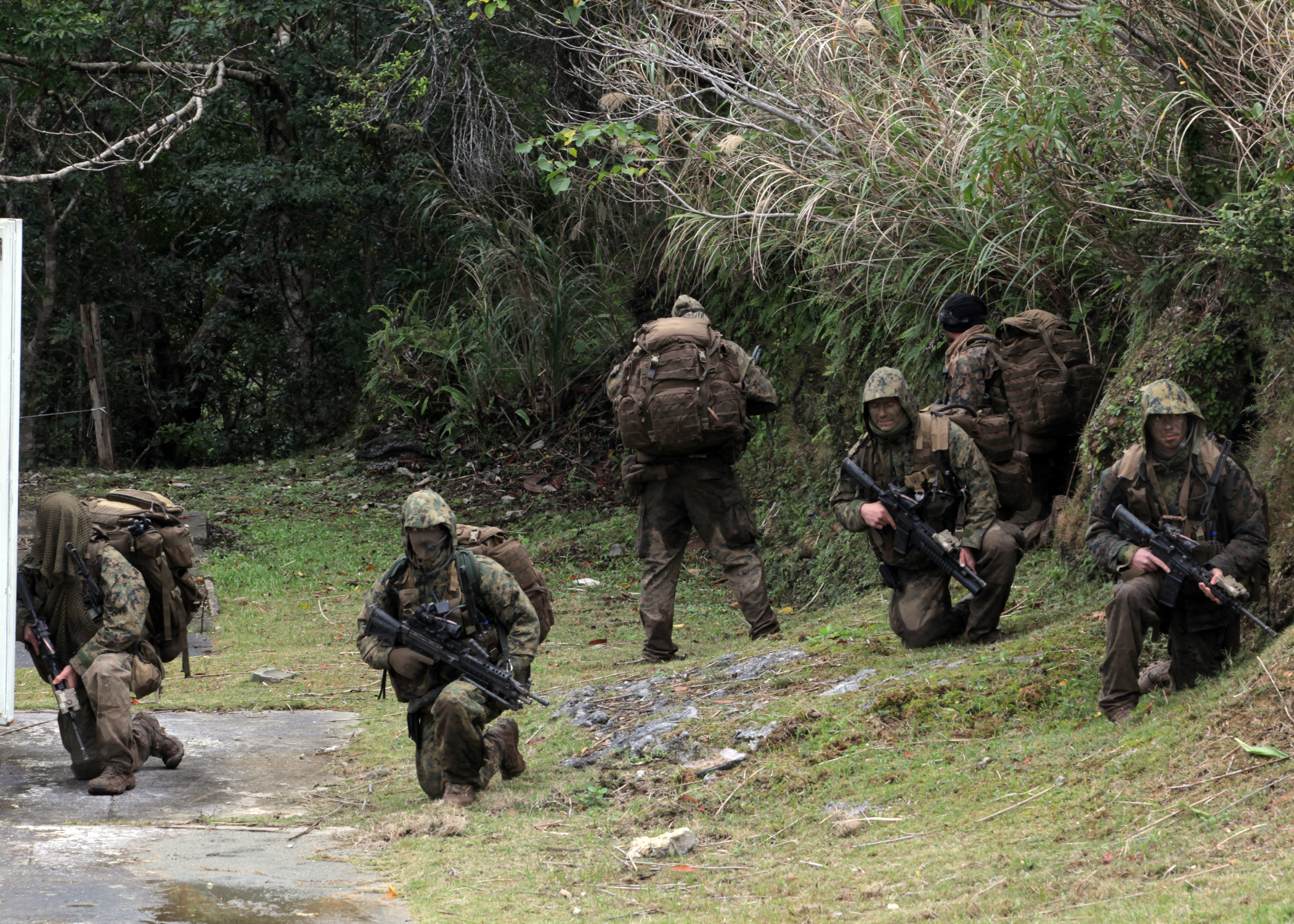
Maritime Raid Force unit move out after a successful reconnaissance mission, shortly before a raid

Maritime Raid Force, 26th Marine Expeditionary Unit conduct an amphibious insertion onto a beach

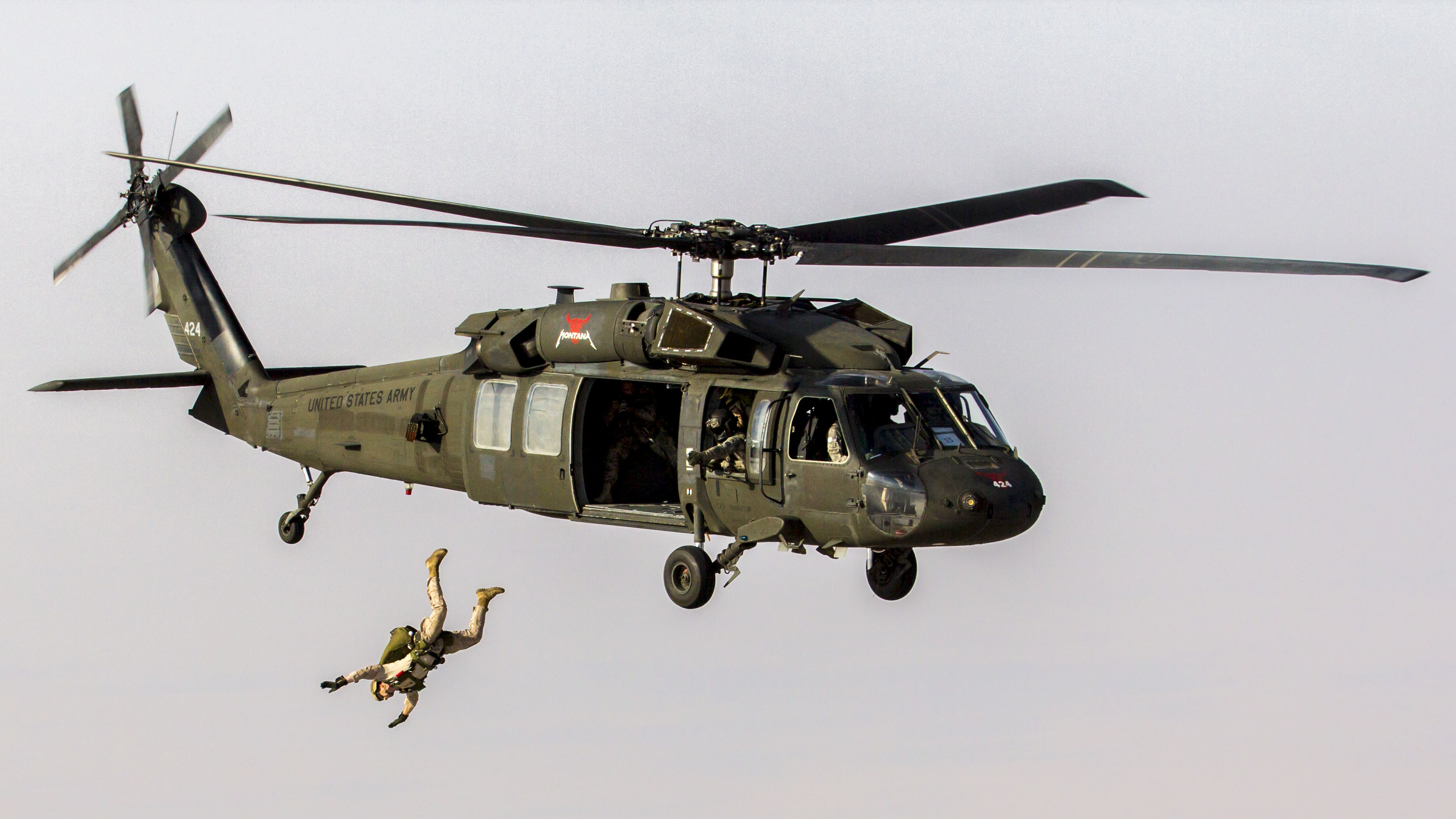
Maritime Raid Force conduct military freefall parachute operations from a UH-60 Black Hawk

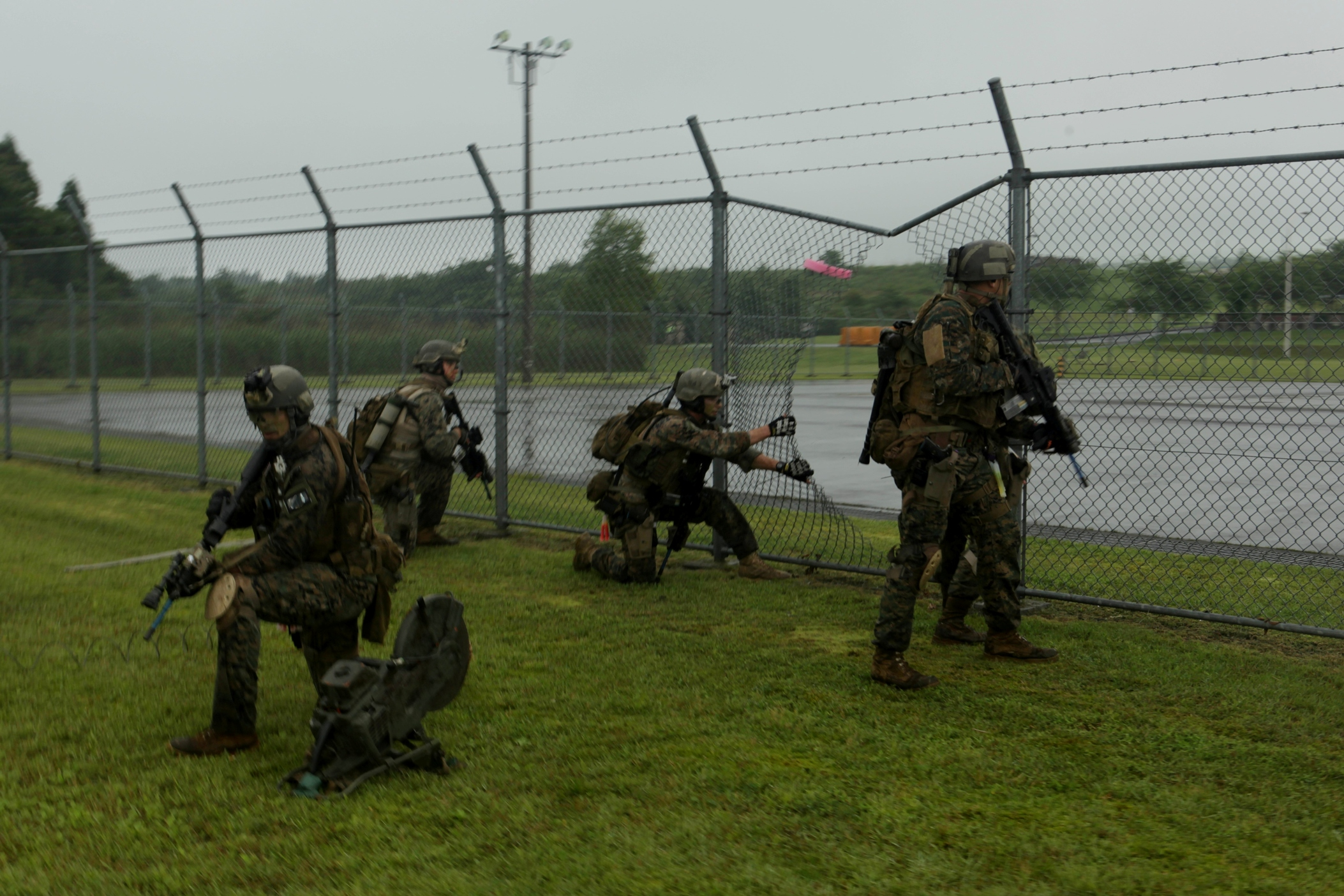
Maritime Raid Force, 31st Marine Expeditionary Unit, provide security outside of a breached fence during a raid
