= Radio Reconnaissance Platoon =

US Marine unit

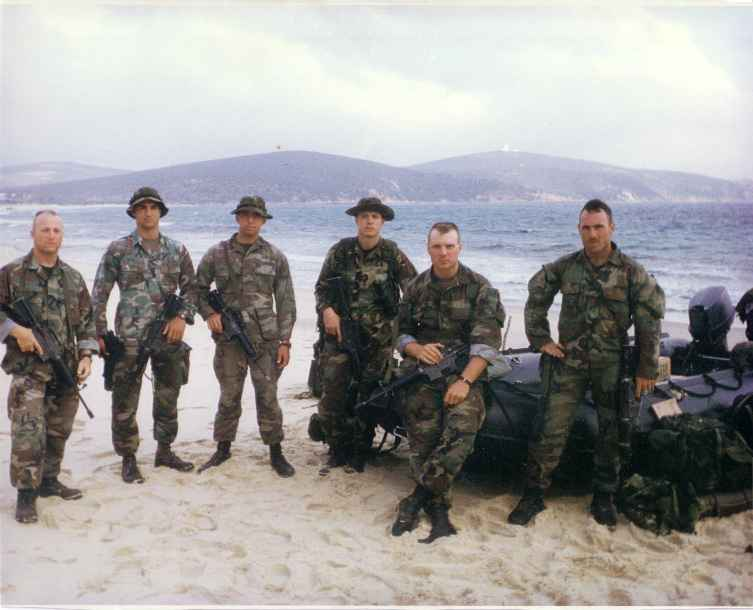
The RRT of the 22nd MEU(SOC), Tunisia, 1997

The Radio Reconnaissance Platoon is a specially trained Marine Corps Intelligence element of a United States Marine Corps Radio Battalion. A Radio Reconnaissance Team (RRT) was assigned as the tactical signals intelligence collection element for the Marine Corps Special Operations Command, Detachment One. Regular RRTs also participate in SOC operations during Marine Expeditionary Unit (Special Operations Capable), or MEU(SOC), deployments.

== Mission ==
The mission of the Radio Reconnaissance Platoon is to conduct tactical signals intelligence and electronic warfare operations in support of the Marine Air-Ground Task Force (MAGTF) commander during advance force, pre-assault, and deep post-assault operations, as well as maritime special purpose operations.

The RRT is used when the use of conventionally-trained radio battalion elements is inappropriate or not feasible.

While deployed with a MEU (SOC), the Radio Reconnaissance Team is also a part of the Maritime Special Purpose Force (MSPF) as a unit of the Reconnaissance & Surveillance Element (MSPF). The MSPF is a sub-element of the MEU(SOC), as a whole, and is responsible for performing specialized maritime missions. These missions include, but are not limited to:

- Direct Action Missions
- Maritime interdiction Operations (MIO)
- Deep reconnaissance

== Capabilities ==
- Indications and warnings
- Limited electronic warfare
- Communications support
- Reconnaissance and surveillance via NATO format

=== Insertion/Extraction Techniques ===
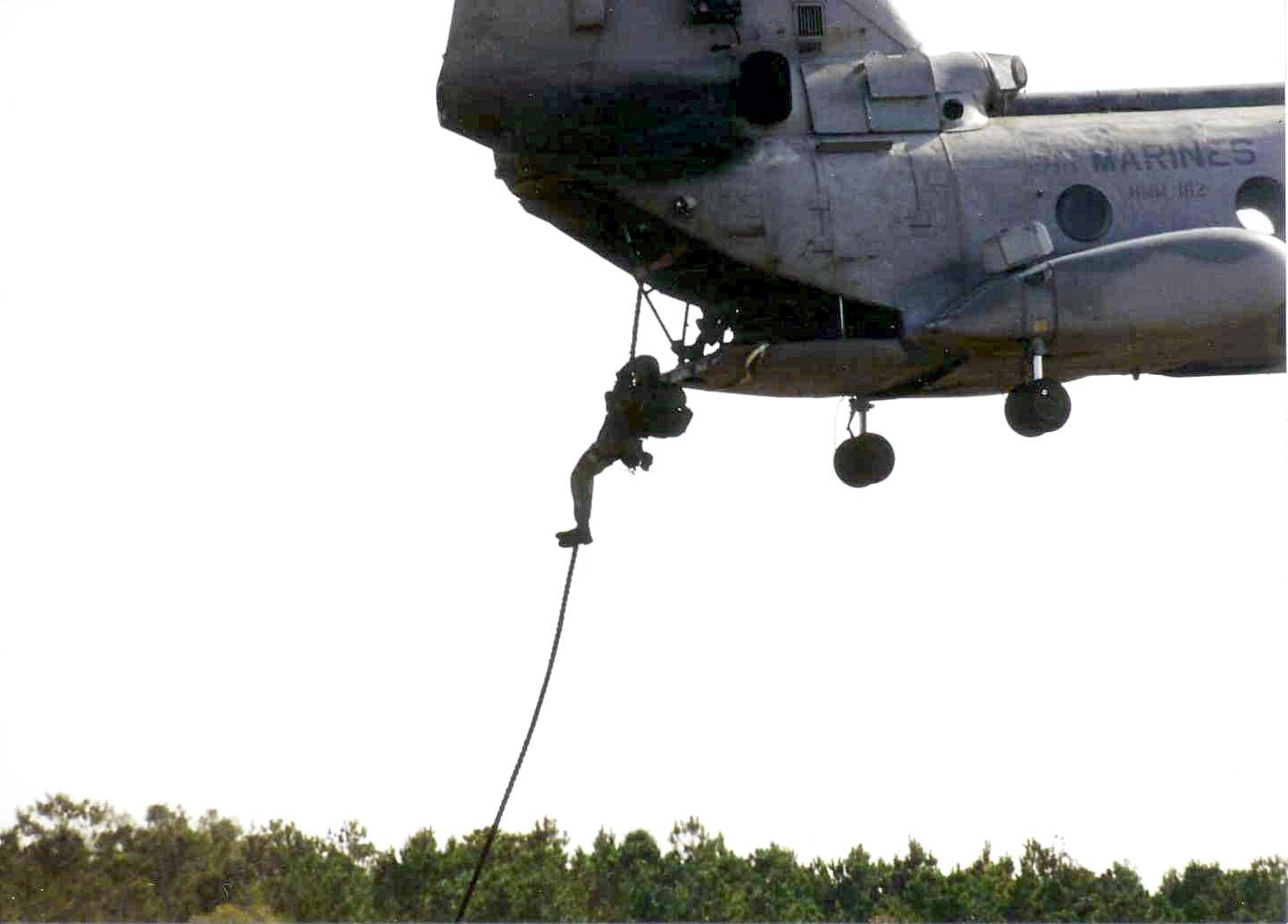
A Radio Reconnaissance Marine fast roping from a CH-46 Sea Knight

- Patrolling
- Helicopter Touchdown
- Helocast
  - Small Boat (Hard Duck, Soft Duck, Rolled Duck)
- Rappel
- Fast Rope
- Special Patrol Insertion/Extraction (SPIE)
  - Wet
  - Dry
  - Static Line
- Over-the-Horizon Combat Rubber Raiding Craft (CRRC)

=== SIGINT ===
- Foreign languages
  - Chinese
  - Arabic
  - Russian
  - Korean
  - Turkish
  - Spanish
  - Persian
  - Croatian/Serbian/Bosnian
- Morse Code intercept (>20 GPM)
- Analysis and reporting

== Training ==
RRP begins with completion of Army Airborne School, which is followed by the Basic Reconnaissance Course, Survival, Evasion, Resistance and Escape (SERE), and the Radio Reconnaissance Indoctrination Program.

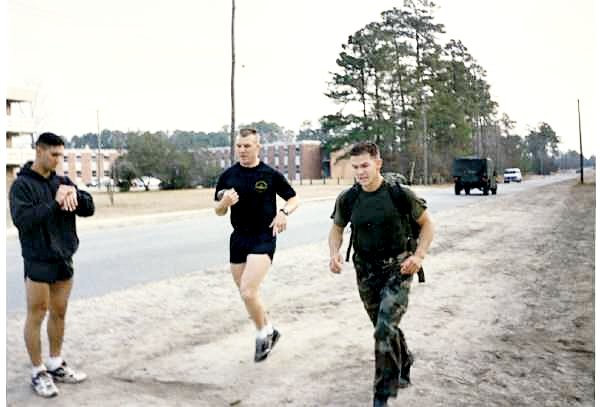
A Sergeant (center) encourages an RRP candidate (right) during the last few yards of the Ruck Run event of the Indoc.

=== Radio Reconnaissance Instruction Program ===
The Radio Reconnaissance Instruction Program (RRIP) is the in-house technical training tool used by the RRP to ensure that its Marines are not only tactically proficient in basic reconnaissance skills but technically adept in their respective areas of expertise. The RRIP has a duration of several days that can be dynamically determined to suit the needs of the platoon and its deployment tempo. During the RRIP, an RRP candidate can expect very long and strenuous days. The RRIP culminates in a series of field training exercises (FTX's) from 24 to 72 hours in length.

=== Advanced training ===
Advanced training may include:

- US Army Ranger School
- USMC Mountain Survival Course
- USMC Mountain Leader Course
- US Army Jumpmaster Course
- US Army Reconnaissance & Surveillance Leaders Course (RSLC)
- US Army Pathfinder School
- Helicopter Rope Suspension Training (HRST) Masters Course
- Coxswain Course
- Maritime Navigator Course

== Organization ==
There are currently three Radio Battalions, two with their own RRPs. 1st Radio Battalion, I Marine Expeditionary Force (MEF), is located at Camp Pendleton, California. 2nd Radio Battalion, II MEF, is located at Camp Lejeune, North Carolina.

Owing to a restructuring of the entire Radio Battalion organization, the former 1st Radio Battalion, with its RRP, moved from Marine Corps Base Hawaii in Kāneʻohe Bay to Camp Pendleton in October 2004. The RRP has since been reestablished in 3rd Radio Battalion, Kaneohe HI. The RRTs of 1st and 3rd Radio Battalions still deploy in support of III MEF's 31st Marine Expeditionary Unit Alpha and Bravo cycles based in Okinawa. 1st Radio Battalion also deploys RRT's in support of I MEF's rotating 11th, 13th and 15th Marine Expeditionary Units.

A six-man Radio Reconnaissance Team (RRT) is typically composed of a Team Leader (Staff Sergeant or Sergeant), Assistant Team Leader (Sergeant or Corporal), Point Man, Navigator, Radio-Telegraph Operator (RTO), and Assistant RTO.

== History ==
Lt. General Alfred M. Gray, Jr., Commanding General of Fleet Marine Force, Atlantic (FMFLant) and future Commandant of the Marine Corps, and Lt. Col. Bill Keller, Commanding Officer of 2nd Radio Battalion, FMFLant, met at Marine Corps Air Station Cherry Point in the spring of 1984 to welcome home the returning members of the 2nd Radio Battalion Detachment from Beirut, Lebanon. The Marines of 2nd Radio Battalion had conducted tactical cryptologic operations in support of the entire deployment of the US peacekeeping force in Beirut since the initial landings at Beirut International Airport.

During the wait, Gray and Keller were discussing the various problems faced by the Radio Battalion detachment. Both agreed that the most significant problem was the lack of a tactical cryptologic database available from national and theater assets prior to the Marines' landing in Beirut. Equally significant were the unconventional aspects of the communications networks used by the various factions in Beirut. Those that posed the greatest threat to the Marines did not abide by standard military communications procedures, nor did they follow set frequencies or call signs.

Because the detachment had received no intelligence from the National Security Agency prior to deployment, they were forced to start from scratch upon arrival in Beirut. General Gray wanted to integrate a Force Reconnaissance team with attached Radio Battalion cryptologists, selected and trained for terrestrial reconnaissance and special operations. He directed Lt. Col. Keller to coordinate with 2nd Force Reconnaissance Company to test this idea.

Keller coordinated with the Commanding Officer of 2nd Force Reconnaissance Company, Maj. Joe Crockett. Their initial step was to attach a Radio Battalion Marine, equipped with an AN/GRR-8 receiver to a Force Recon Team during an exercise and see if he could keep up and do something worthwhile. The experiment did not go well, and the concept was tabled until that summer, when Lieutenant Colonel Chuck Gallina became Commanding Officer (CO) of 2nd Radio Bn. General Gray discussed the idea with Gallina, who became a major proponent of the concept.

In December 1984, Captain E.L. Gillespie, a J2 SIGINT Operations Officer in Joint Special Operations Command, arrived at Radio Battalion to develop a concept of operations to integrate Radio Battalion Marines with Force Recon teams for independent advance force operations.

Captain Gillespie submitted a draft "Talking Paper" contending that integration with a four-man Force Recon team was not viable due to conflicting missions. He suggested that a separate six-man Radio Bn team be trained in selected airborne and seaborne insertion/extraction techniques, terrestrial reconnaissance, and survival skills.

The original mission statement for the team was, "To conduct limited communications intelligence and specified electronic warfare operations in support of Force Reconnaissance operations during advance force or special operations missions".

The initial list of titles for this proposed group was:

- Force Reconnaissance Support Team (FRST)
- Radio Search Team (RST)
- Signal Search Team (SST)
- Special Search Team (SST)
- Radio Research Team (RRT)
- Radio Reconnaissance Team (RRT)

General Gray got the list and personally circled the Radio Reconnaissance Team as the official name for the teams. He then directed the CO of Radio Battalion to screen, select, and train the required personnel to deploy two six-man RRT's for a proof of concept operational deployment during the advance force operational phase of Exercise Solid Shield-85.

He also ensured that the CO of 2nd Force Reconnaissance Company would assist in the personnel selection, training and equipping, and that II MEF's Solid Shield-85 OPLANS, OPORDERS, and Annexes would adequately reflect the integration of the RRT.

Captain Gillespie was directed to immediately commence screening of 2nd Radio Battalion personnel. However, most Radio Battalion Marines did not share the officers' enthusiasm for the project. There was also resistance by Company Commanders, who did not want to allow their best Marines to be assigned to the task. With the exception of the Senior non-commissioned officers and Sergeants, the majority of the Marines provided to form the initial RRT's were "malcontents" waiting to be discharged.

At this time, Major Carrick insisted that all of the RRT candidates must go through the 2nd Force Reconnaissance Company Indoctrination Process (Indoc). Carrick later admitted that the only reason that he insisted on this issue was that he felt that all or most of the Radio Battalion Marines would either quit or fail the Indoc and the project would be put to rest once and for all.

However, all of the RRT candidates passed the Indoc. Captain Gillespie later talked to the Indoc instructors, who indicated that they had done everything that they could think of to make the RRT Marines quit, but they wouldn't.

After the Indoc, one RRT was sent to Army Airborne School at Fort Benning, Georgia, while the other Marines prepared and trained for Solid Shield-85. The exercise went well, and by all accounts, the Radio Reconnaissance proof of concept was an unqualified success.

In 1987, 1st Radio Battalion at MCB Hawaii officially created a Radio Reconnaissance Platoon. Prior to 1987, the battalion had shied away from designating the unit as "Radio Reconnaissance" for fear of dividing vital resources and creating a separatist culture within the ranks of MEU(SOC) deploying Radio Battalion detachments. 1st RRP Marines trained with Alpha Company, 3rd Reconnaissance Battalion in the initial stages and attended various multi-service schools to perfect their skills. During its first two years, 1st Radio Battalion's RRIP consisted of 4–6 months of training, formal schools, and exercises prior to a Marine achieving certification and being assigned to a team.

Between 1986 and 1989, RRT's were deployed as an element of the Marine Expeditionary Unit (Special Operations Capable) Radio Battalion Detachment assigned to each of the rotating 11th, 13th, 15th, 22nd, 24th, and 26th MEU(SOC) deployments.

Captain Gillespie was assigned as the officer in charge of the 2nd Radio Battalion Detachment, 24th MEU(SOC) in 1986, which was the first Radio Battalion detachment to conduct real-world operations during Operation Earnest Will (a Kuwaiti oil tanker escort operation). The 24th MEU(SOC) RRT reinforced by members of 1st RRP with specific linguist skills, was involved in significant cryptologic operations in the Persian Gulf and provided intelligence support for several combat actions against Iranian forces, including the seizure of the Iranian mine-laying vessel, Iran Ajr and the incident at Middle Shoals Light. Other RRT personnel were involved in actions in Panama leading to and during Operation Just Cause, the invasion of Panama.

In the Pacific Theater, the first certified RRT to participate in real-world operations deployed in 1988–89 as part of the 13th MEU(SOC) Radio Battalion Detachment commanded by First Lieutenant Kirk Kicklighter. Staff Sergeant Scott Laasanen and Sergeant Daniel Stinson served as team leaders during collection missions in support of Australian forces intervening in civil war in Papua New Guinea, as well as intelligence operations against rebel forces seeking to overthrow the newly installed government of President Corazon Aquino in the Republic of the Philippines.

== See also ==
- Radio Battalion
- United States Marine Corps Force Reconnaissance
- Alfred M. Gray, Jr.
