= Marine expeditionary unit (special operations capable) =

US Marine Corps designation for a Marine expeditionary unit

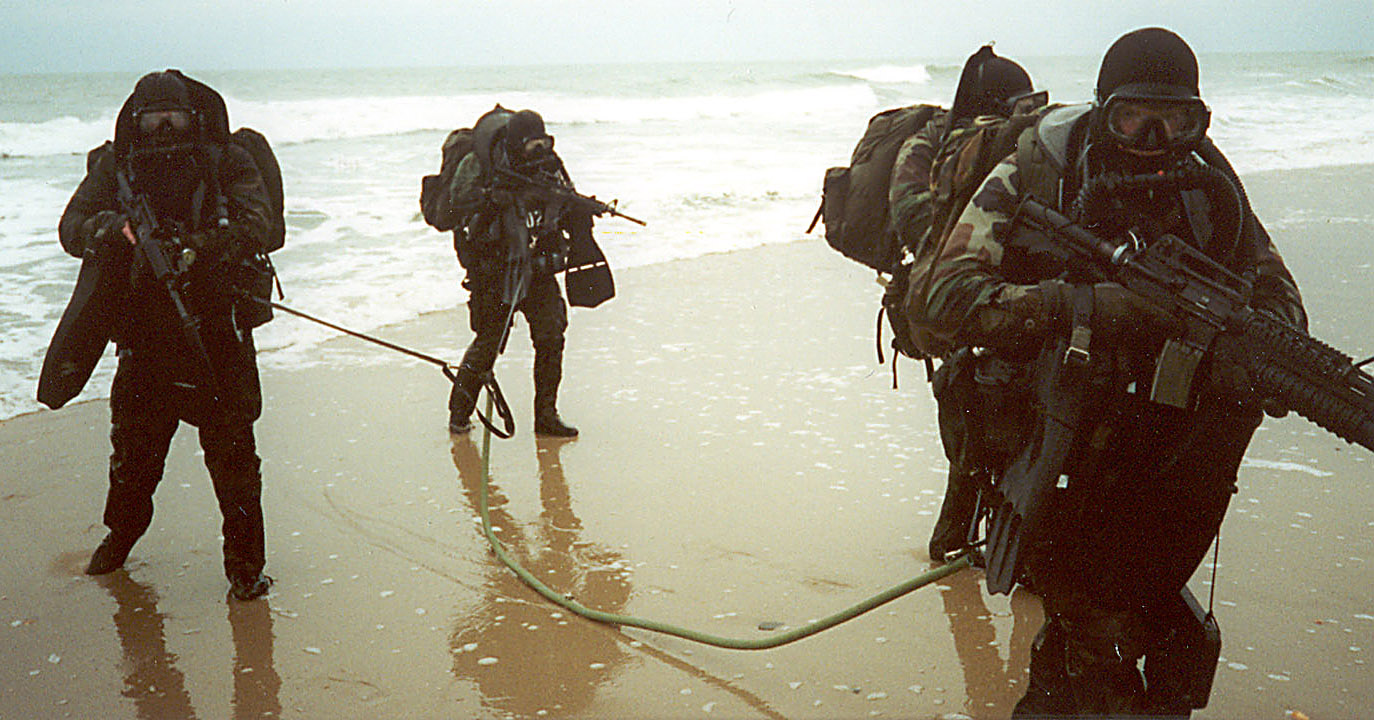
A four-man team of Force Reconnaissance Marines simulate infiltrating a beachhead. Force Reconnaissance Marines form part of the Maritime Special Purpose Force in a MEU(SOC).

Marine expeditionary unit (special operations capable) (MEU(SOC)) is a program created by the United States Marine Corps (USMC) and the United States Navy (USN) in 1985 for Marine expeditionary units (MEU). The program enhances MEUs providing them with additional training and equipment to become certified as "special operations capable" with a Maritime Special Purpose Force (MSPF). MEU(SOC) are conventional forces; the Marine Corps term "special operations capable" is unrelated to the term "special operations force" used by the Department of Defense. (Note: MEU(SOC) are conventional forces, and are not a Secretary of Defense-designated special operations force.) The MEU(SOC) program when it was established did not form part of the Special Operations Command (SOCOM). (Note: Walker writes "...Marine Corps decision not to provide dedicated assets to SOCOM, choosing instead to develop the MEU(SOC)." Barrett writes "The other three services put their SOF under SOCOM, but the Marine Corps refused to make a force contribution." Berris et al. write "...the Marine Corps did not contribute forces to what eventually became SOCOM ...")

For over a decade, the Marine Corps did not maintain the MEU(SOC) program. (Note: Marine Corps (policy) Order MCO 3120.9C dated August 2009 mentioned SOC, and was replaced by MCO 3120.13 in October 2015, which did not mention SOC. The MEU pre deployment training MCO 3502.3B dated April 2012 mentioned SOC, and was replaced by MCO 3502.3C in September 2019 which no longer mentioned SOC.) In 2023, the 26th MEU became the first MEU to be certified as MEU(SOC) in over a decade. In 2024, the 24th MEU was certified as MEU(SOC). The MEU(SOC) program is not part of the Marine Forces Special Operations Command (MARSOC). (Note: The USMC publication Marine Corps Special Operations dated January 2025 does not incorporate the MEU(SOC) program in the MARFORSOC organization in figure 3-1 on Marine Forces Special Operations Command Headquarters Organization.)

The theory behind the MEU(SOC) is to provide continuous and perpetual maritime & amphibious force projection. Such units are expected to be able to respond to a variety of crises, most notably incidents that conventional units may not be able to properly handle. A MEU(SOC) is also expected to be capable of providing various forms of security or a military presence to any region worldwide, within 24–72 hours of receiving orders. Such crises may range from natural disasters to civil or national discord, or total invasion of forces into a hostile area. The term "special operations" in the Non-SOF context, therefore, refers to special taskings of limited duration in support of a combat commander. These operations include:

- Amphibious raids
- Non-combatant evacuation operations (NEO)
- Security operations
- Tactical recovery of aircraft and personnel (TRAP)
- Direct action
- Humanitarian/civic assistance

Therefore, "the primary objective of the MEU(SOC)...is to provide the theater CINC's with an effective means of dealing with the uncertainties of future threats, providing a forward deployed unit that is inherently balanced, sustainable, flexible, responsive, expandable and credible."

== History ==
The Special Operations Capable (SOC) program was developed by the USMC in response to a memorandum by Secretary of Defense Caspar Weinberger in 1983 to each of the services that special operations forces should be revitalized as a matter of national urgency. In June 1985, General Paul Kelley, then Commandant of the USMC, decided against establishing special operations forces and instead decided to enhance Marine amphibious units (MAU) to be able to conduct special operations. In December 1985, the 26th MAU became the first MAU to be certified MAU(SOC) after completing a four month SOC training program. The next two MAUs completed a six month long program. The training program involved eighteen selected special operations missions. In 1988, the Marine amphibious units were renamed Marine expeditionary units (MEU). By 1988 all MEUs were required to have completed the SOC program and be certified MEU(SOC) prior to deployment.

USSOCOM had been established in 1987 with the other services contributing their special operations forces. General Kelley refused to make a special operations forces contribution.

== Special operations capable (SOC) Marine expeditionary units ==
Each marine expeditionary force (MEF) has MEUs. When specifically trained and operationally qualified to perform special operational duties, they are then known as a Marine expeditionary units (special operations capable), or MEU (SOC); designed under the battle plans of combined maritime-based ground and air elements that make up a MAGTF.

=== Conventional operations ===
Beyond those conventional missions assigned to a MEU, the specialized units within the Marine Corps's special operations capable community are able to perform the following capabilities assigned:

- Battle area ingress/egress: enter and exit a battle area.
- Locate and fix the enemy: involves finding and identifying enemy forces, maintaining surveillance once located, assessing the capabilities and intentions, and reporting those findings.
- Engage the enemy: engage, destroy, or capture the enemy in a rural or urban setting, in hostile environments, with minimized/controlled collateral damage.
- Rapid staff planning: the capability to rapidly plan and be prepared to commence execution of operations within six (6) hours of receipt of the warning order/alert order. Commencement of operations is signified by the launch of forces by air and/or surface means. This may range from the insertion of reconnaissance and surveillance assets in support of the mission to the actual launch of an assault force. Rapid staff planning is a key to MEU(SOC)s overall operational success.
- Joint force interoperability: the MEU will normally be committed in conjunction with joint or combined task force (J/CTF) operations. Joint/combined force interoperability is a shared responsibility of the force commander and subordinate elements. Interoperability depends on compatible C4I equipment and standardized procedures while embracing common terminology and techniques. The objective is a thorough understanding of mutual command and control procedures, capabilities, and limitations developed through continual participation in joint and combined exercises.
- Amphibious raids: conduct amphibious raids via air and/or surface means from extended ranges in order to inflict loss or damage upon opposing forces, create diversions, capture and/or evacuate individuals and material by swift incursion into an objective area followed by a planned withdrawal. The amphibious raid is the primary operational focus for the forward-operating MEU(SOC)s.
- Limited-objective attacks: assaults based on limited force.
- Non-combatant evacuation operations (NEO): conduct NEO by evacuating and protecting noncombatants in either a permissive or non-permissive environment. This capability includes the requirement to provide a security force, evacuation control center, recovery force, medical support, and transportation of evacuees.
- Show of force operations: engage in show of force operations, to include amphibious demonstrations, presence of forces, or flyovers in support of U.S. interests.
- Reinforcement operations: reinforce U.S. (or designated Allied/friendly) forces by helicopter and/or surface means. This includes the capability to conduct relief-in-place or a passage of lines.
- Maritime security operations: conduct security operations to protect U.S. (or designated Allied/ friendly nation) property and noncombatants in maritime areas. Forward-operating MEU(SOC)s will be capable of establishing an integrated local security perimeter, screening for explosive devices, and providing personal protection to designated individuals.
- Mobile training teams (MTT): provide training to assigned individuals, groups, or units.
- Civil–military operations – Humanitarian/civil assistance in disaster relief: provide services such as medical and dental care, minor construction repair to civilian facilities, temporary assistance to local government, and assistance to counter the devastation caused by a manmade or natural disaster.
- Tactical deception operations: design and implement tactical deception operations plans in order to deceive the enemy through electronic means, feints, demonstrations, and ruses which cause the enemy to react or fail to react in a manner which assists in the accomplishment of the overall mission.
- Fire support control: control and coordinate naval surface fire, air support and ground fire support coordination measures for U.S. or designated Allied/friendly forces.
- Counter-intelligence operations: conduct counterintelligence and human intelligence operations that protect the MEU(SOC) against espionage, sabotage, terrorism, and subversion by developing and providing information the commander can use to undertake countermeasures to protect his resources.
- Initial terminal guidance (ITG): establish and operate navigational, signal, and/or electronic devices for guiding helicopter and surface waves from a designated point to a landing zone or beach.
- Electronic warfare/signals intelligence: conduct tactical SIGINT, limited ground bases EW, and communications security (COMSEC) monitoring and analysis in direct support of the MAGTF. This is accomplished by employing organic collection and direction finding (DF) equipment as well as through connectivity to national and theater SIGINT/EW assets.
- Military operations in urban terrain (MOUT): conduct military operations in a built-up area.

=== MEU-special operations ===
The Marine Corps does not deploy traditional special operations forces (SOF); the Marine Corps's special operations contribution, the Marine Raider Regiment, is directed by the United States Special Operations Command. Therefore, forward-operating MEU(SOC)s receive enhanced training and are specially equipped and organized to provide selected maritime special purpose capabilities complementary and in support of combat commanders. In addition to the conventional capabilities noted above, MEU(SOC)s will, upon deployment, possess the following skills and capabilities:

- Close-quarters battle (CQB): conduct direct action missions, employing close quarter battle combat and dynamic assault tactics and techniques.
- Direct action: conduct raid, ambush, or direct assault tactics; conduct standoff attacks by fire from air, ground, or maritime platforms; and provide terminal guidance for precision-guided munitions.
- Clandestine recovery operations: ability to recovery downed aviation pilots or sensitive materials behind enemy lines; conduct clandestine extraction of personnel or sensitive items from enemy-controlled areas.
- Tactical recovery of aircraft, equipment and personnel (TRAP): conduct overland recovery of downed aircraft and personnel, aircraft sanitization, and provide advanced trauma-life support in a benign or hostile environment.
- Specialized demolition operations: conduct specialized breaching: to employ specialized demolitions in support of other special operations. This includes an explosive entry capability to support close quarters battle/combat.
- In-extremis hostage rescue (IHR): conduct recovery operations during an in-extremis situation by means of an emergency extraction of hostages and/or sensitive items from a non-permissive environment and expeditiously transport them to a designated safe haven. The IHR capability will only be employed when directed by appropriate authority and when dedicated national assets are unavailable. Emphasis is placed on isolation, containment, employment of reconnaissance assets, and preparation for turnover of the crisis site when/if national assets arrive
- Airfield/Ports/Other Key Facilities Seizure: secure an airfield, port, or other key facilities in order to support MAGTF missions or to receive follow-on forces.
- Gas and oil platforms operations (GOPLAT): conduct seizure and/or destruction of offshore gas and oil platforms.
- Maritime interdiction operations (MIO): conduct MIO in support of visit, board, search, and seizure (VBSS) operations during day or night on a cooperative, uncooperative, or hostile contact of interest.
- Reconnaissance and Surveillance (R&S): conduct clandestine reconnaissance and surveillance through entry into an objective area by air, surface, or subsurface means in order to perform information collection, target acquisition, and other intelligence collection tasks.

== Pre-deployment training program (PTP) ==
Every 18-months, all units that are under the Marine air–ground task force's MEFs assemble the MEUs and train them individually within their units, or together in a cohesive exercise. They have one purpose, to become certified special operations capable. The Special Operations Capable Certification process is in three phases: initial, intermediate, and final. Once certified, they are under status as "force-in-readiness" for 15-months.

=== Initial training phase ===
The initial training phase is the phase that focuses on training of individual personnel and small units of the Marine Expeditionary Units. Many Marines attend courses or training schools that may require advancement or additional skills to meet the demand of their unit's quota. Training and exercises by many cooperative cross-service agencies also help set courses of instruction for the MEU's Command Elements, subordinate elements (MSE), and the Maritime Special Purpose Force. Also, staff training is included in the MEU's CE and MSE elements. Because of time constraints and limited training resources, every effort must be made to efficiently use the training time available during this phase.

1. Expeditionary strike group/Marine expeditionary unit (special operations capable) staff planning course
2. Operations and intelligence seminar
3. MEU command element situational training exercises (STX)
4. Initial training phase "at-sea period"
5. Special Operations Training Group (SOTG) special skills courses
6. Fire support coordination exercise
7. Interoperability and parallel training: conducted jointly with an Amphibious Squadron and Naval Special Warfare detachment

=== Intermediate training phase ===
All the training and exercises that are conducted by the Marine Expeditionary Units while either on pre-deployment, or currently deployed, under a training curriculum, or not deployed operationally are during the Intermediate Training Phase. The purpose of this phase is to build unit cohesion and leadership, and emphasis on functioning as a team. A string of exercises are begun, and an MEU uses this time to rehearse for the upcoming Special Operations Capable Exercise that will determine their Special Operations Capable certification.

At the beginning of the intermediate training phase, an operational analysis is conducted by the MEU Commander in order to assess the strengths and weaknesses of the subordinate elements. This will also assist in developing the commander's guidance regarding training priorities. Once developed, the MEU Commander will provide training guidance to improve and sustain the MSE's required capabilities.

1. Intermediate training phase at sea period: emphasis the training of Gas/Oil Platform (GOPLAT) and Visit, Board, Search, and Seizure (VBSS) training. Under unique predeployment or operational circumstances, the MEF Commander can reduce or increase the emphasis on either of the mission. Concurrence on this modification to training will be obtained from Headquarters Marine Corps Plans, Policies and Operations (PP&O) from the appropriate Commander, Marine Corps Forces.
2. Long-range night raids: takes place on ground or other structures.
3. Maritime Special Purpose Force Interoperability Training: following the successful completion of individual and small unit special skills training conducted during the "Initial Training Phase", the purpose is to consolidate the Command and Control (C&C), Reconnaissance and Surveillance (R&S), Assault, Security, and Aviation Assault elements. The training is either conducted locally or off-site. It also proves a logical prerequisite for the TRUEX and opportunity to conduct basic level training with the Amphibious Squadron, Navy Special Warfare Detachment.
4. Training in urban environment exercise (TRUEX): The TRUEX provides the MEU's elements of the CE, ACE, CSSE, and along with the MSPF, the opportunity for training in unfamiliar built-up environments during urbanized warfare. The MEF's Special Operations Training Group (SOTG) coordinates their training with the municipal, state, and federal officials, such as the local and state police, fire departments, the Federal Aviation Administration (FAA), and Federal Bureau of Investigation (FBI) to make this training as realistic as possible for Marines within the MEU. This Exercise gives the MEU the preparation for any world conflict or peacekeeping/humanitarian operations. Many local towns have participated in the events. TRUEX provides an opportunity to integrate unique individual and small unit, close quarters combat (CQC) skills in conjunction with the MEU's increased proficiency in the rapid response planning process (R2P2), and practice in enhanced urban operations.
5. Marine expeditionary unit exercise (MEUEX): The MEUEX is the final Intermediate Training Phase exercise that evaluates the MEU's core capabilities before commencing the final test during the Special Operations Capable Exercise, which will determine its certification for special operations. All of the MEU's subordinate units participate in the MEUEX. The primary focus of this exercise is to refine the unit standard operating procedures's and R2P2. In some cases, if possible, the MEUEX is conducted in conjunction with an at-sea period.

=== Final training phase ===
The final training phase is the culmination of all predeployment training activities. Its focus is on preparation for the Special Operations Capable Exercise, and predeployment embarkation requirements.

1. Pre-embarkation Maintenance Stand-Down: This is held before the last scheduled at-sea training period. It allows the MEU time to ensure all equipment is in the highest state of readiness prior to the SOCEX.
2. Advanced Amphibious Training: During the last scheduled at-sea training period, the Amphibious Squadron (PHIBRON) and MEU refine their ability to conduct amphibious operations, and conventional and selected maritime special operations capabilities.
3. Fleet Exercise (FLEETEX) - Supporting Arms Coordination Exercise (SACEX): This is the PHIBRON and MEU's final evaluation of its amphibious warfare, conventional, and selected maritime special operations capabilities prior to SOCEX.
4. Special Operations Capable Exercise (SOCEX): Final Evaluation and Certification. This is the final test that certifies the MEU to be capable for maritime special operations. It designates the MEU into MEU (Special Operations Capable), or MEU(SOC).
5. Pre-Overseas Movement (POM): During the POM period, the final preparations for deployment are conducted. The focus is on personnel and equipment readiness. Training and operational deficiencies noted during the SOCEX evaluation are corrected as required.
6. Crisis Interaction Requirements Exercise (CIREX): The CIREX is a discussion built around a crisis scenario tailored to the PHIBRON and MEU(SOC). It is conducted at Fort Bragg, NC to ensure the maximum exposure of the PHIBRON/MEU personnel to their SOF counterparts. The CIREX enhances PHIBRON and MEU(SOC) understanding of, and interoperability with, Joint Special Operations Command Task Forces and Elements. Staff members from the PHIBRON and MEU CE and selected members of the MEUs MSEs participate in the CIREX.
7. Washington, D.C. Area Commanders’ Briefings: During this period select members of the PHIBRON and MEU(SOC) receive briefings from senior United States Department of State, Department of Defense, Joint Chiefs of Staff, Headquarters Marine Corps, and Central Intelligence Agency personnel. Conducting these briefings within the Washington D.C. area ensures the highest level of participation by the organizations and external agencies involved. Other agencies or Unified Combatant Command representatives may be added at the request of the PHIBRON and MEU(SOC) commanders.

== See also ==
- United States Special Operations Forces
- Seabee Engineer Reconnaissance Team
- U.S. Coast Guard Deployable Specialized Forces

== Bibliography ==
- Barrett, Sean (December 2018). Always Faithful, Always Forward: Marine Corps Culture and the Development of Marine Corps Forces Special Operations Command (PDF) (Master's thesis). US Navy Postgraduate School. OCLC 1088435853.
- Berris, Major William; Ellia, LCDR Matthew; Fallon, Major James; Kendoll, Major Raymond; Markert, Major George; Prosser, Major Michael (2005). Marine Expeditionary Units (Special Operations Capable) Relevancy In The Near Term (PDF) (Report). Marine Corps University.
- Nicholson, MAJ Lawrence D. (1994). An analysis of the twenty-one missions of the Marine Corps Expeditionary Unit (Special Operations Capable) (PDF) (Master's thesis). Fort Leavenworth, Kansas: United States Army Command and General Staff College. OCLC 227816481. Archived (PDF) from the original on April 24, 2022.
- Piedmont, John P. (2010). Det One: U.S. Marine Corps U.S. Special Operations Command Detachment, 2003-2006 (PDF). Washington, D.C: History Division United States Marine Corps. OCLC 746221631. PCN: 10600001300.
- Schrecker, MAJ M.G. (April 2001). The MEU(SOC) Predeployment Training Program: Training the MEU or the MSPF? (PDF) (Master's thesis). United States Marine Corps Command and Staff College. OCLC 227993949. Archived (PDF) from the original on June 1, 2022.
- United States Marine Corps (13 September 2019). "Marine Expeditionary Unit (MEU) Pre-deployment Training Program (PTP)" (PDF). Marine Corps Order 3502.3C. Department of Navy.
- United States Marine Corps (30 April 2012). "Marine Expeditionary Unit (MEU) and MEU (Special Operations Capable) (SOC) Pre-deployment Training Program (PTP)" (PDF). Marine Corps Order 3502.3B. Department of Navy.
- United States Marine Corps (29 October 2015). "Policy for Marine Expeditionary Units (MEU)" (PDF). Marine Corps Order 3120.13. Department of Navy.
- United States Marine Corps (4 August 2009). "Policy for Marine Expeditionary Units (MEU) and MEU Expeditionary Units (Special Operations Capable) MEU(SOC)" (PDF). Marine Corps Order 3120.9C. Department of Navy.
- Walker, Robert G. (December 1998). SPEC FI: The United States Marine Corps and Special Operations (PDF) (Master's thesis). US Navy Postgraduate School. OCLC 227886937. Archived (PDF) from the original on May 9, 2021.
