= Main effort =

Unit assigned to the most critical action

In maneuver warfare doctrine, the main effort is the unit assigned responsibility for accomplishing the action most critical to the overall success of a command's mission. It serves as the focal point upon which converges the combat power of the force, and receives priority support of any kind when requested. While a commander always designates a main effort, it may shift during the course of an operation as events unfold.
