= United States Marine Corps Reconnaissance Battalions =

Reconnaissance assets of Marine Air-Ground Task Force

Marine Division Reconnaissance
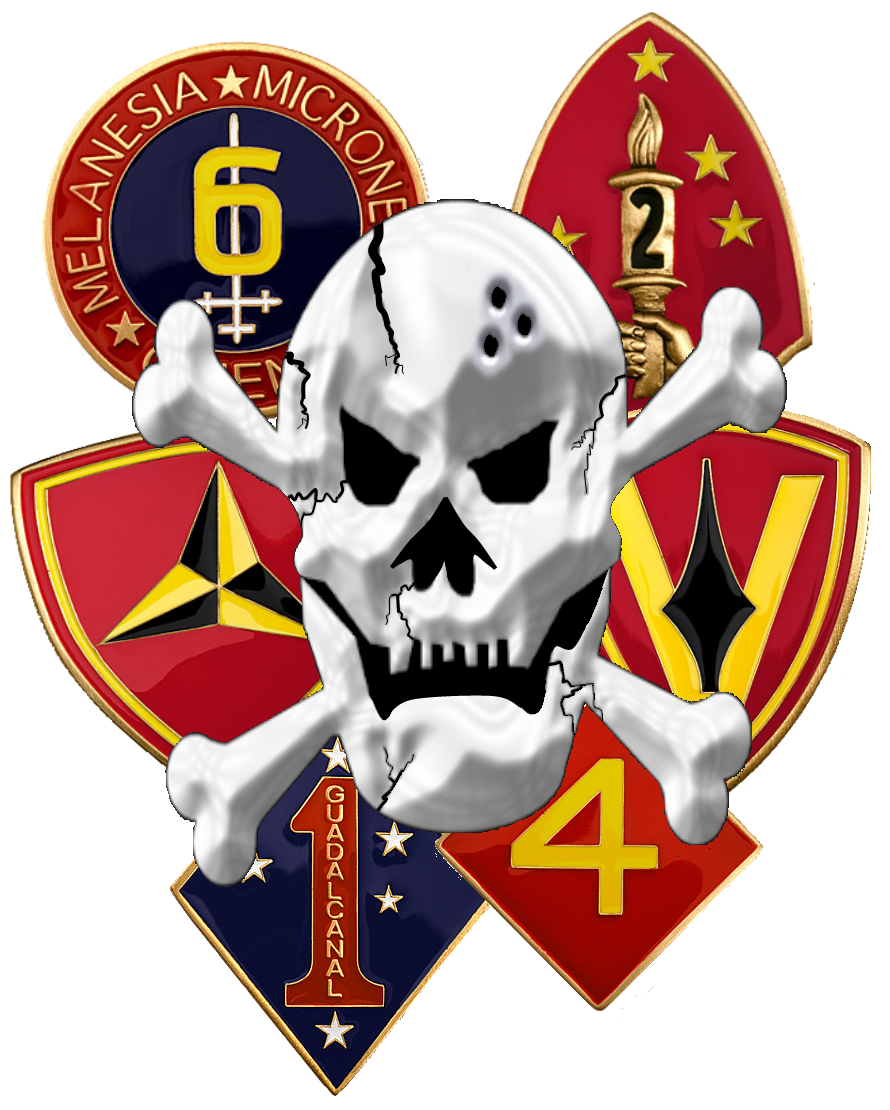
- Division Recon badge
- Active: 1958 – present
- Country: United States of America
- Branch: United States Marine Corps
- Type: Reconnaissance unit
- Role: Direct support of the Ground Combat Element for: Amphibious and underwater reconnaissance; Advanced Force Operations; Battlespace shaping; Ground reconnaissance; Surveillance; Raids; Direct Action
- Size: Four battalions: three active duty and one reserve
- Garrison/HQ: Camp Pendleton, California; Camp Lejeune, North Carolina; Camp Schwab, Okinawa
- Mottos: "Swift, Silent, Deadly"
- Colors: Black & gold
- Engagements: Vietnam War; Gulf War; Kosovo War; Operation Iraqi Freedom; Operation Enduring Freedom

Insignia
- Identification symbol: Recon Jack

A United States Marine Corps Reconnaissance Battalion (or commonly called Marine Division Recon) is a reconnaissance unit within the Ground Combat Element (GCE) of a Marine Air-Ground Task Force (MAGTF) that conducts amphibious reconnaissance, underwater reconnaissance, advanced force operations, battlespace shaping, ground reconnaissance, surveillance, raids and direct action in support of the Marine division (MARDIV), subordinate division elements, or a designated MAGTF.

Although reconnaissance companies are conventional forces they do share many of the same tactics, techniques, procedures and equipment of special operations forces. (Note: Marine Corps ground reconnaissance units are not special operations forces (SOF), although they do share many of the same tactics, techniques and procedures (TTP), and terms and equipment.)

== Role ==
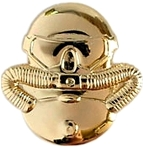
USMC Combat Diver Badge.

Reconnaissance forces are an asset of the MAGTF that provides military intelligence to command and control for battlespace, allowing the MAGTF to act, and react, to changes in the battlefield. While Marine reconnaissance assets may operate in specialized missions, they are unlike their United States Special Operations Forces counterparts. Both division and force are solely reserved for supporting the infantry, which are directly involved in the commander's force of action in the battlefield, or battlespace shaping.

Many of the types of reconnaissance missions that are conducted by Marine Recon units are characterized by its degree in depth of penetration. This greatly increases the mission time, risk, and support coordination needs. Division reconnaissance are in charge of the commander's Area of Influence, the close and distant battlespace; the force reconnaissance platoons are employed farther in the deep battlespace, or the Area of Interest.

These are the main missions that are outlined to some, or all of, the reconnaissance assets in the Marine Corps:

- Plan, coordinate, and conduct amphibious reconnaissance-ground reconnaissance and surveillance to observe, identify, and report enemy activity, and collect other information of military significance.
- Conduct specialized surveying to include: hydrographic survey reconnaissance and/or demolitions, beach permeability and topography, routes, bridges, structures, urban/rural areas, helicopter landing zones (LZ), parachute drop zones (DZ), aircraft Forward operating base (FOB), and mechanized reconnaissance missions.
- When properly task organized with other forces, equipment or personnel, assist in specialized engineer reconnaissance, radio, mobile, and other special reconnaissance missions.
- Infiltrate mission areas by necessary means to include: air assault and airborne operations, surface, and subsurface.
- Conduct counter reconnaissance.
- Conduct Initial Terminal Guidance (ITG) for helicopters, landing craft, parachutists, air-delivery, and re-supply.
- Designate and engage selected targets with organic weapons and force fires to support battlespace shaping. This includes designation and terminal guidance of precision-guided munitions.
- Conduct post-strike reconnaissance to determine and report battle damage assessment on a specified target or area.
- Conduct limited scale ambushes, commando style raids, and irregular warfare.

== History ==
The Marine Corps's division-level reconnaissance was first conceived in 1941 by Lieutenant Colonel William J. Whaling. He needed a group of specialized scouts and skilled marksmen to form a "Scout and Sniper Company". Two of the newly established Marine divisions, 1st and 2nd Marine Division contained their own scout company. Larger infantry regiments called for more recon, scouts and sniper assets. By 1945, the divisions had instituted and organized their own scout-sniper, light armored reconnaissance (LAR), and division reconnaissance assets.

As a result of MCO 5401.5, dated 24 August 1952, the USMC Force Restructure and Implementation Plan, the Marine Corps shrunk its forces and as a result reconnaissance battalions were eliminated and reconnaissance companies became a part of infantry regiments.

2nd Reconnaissance Battalion was formed on 22 January 1958. 3rd Reconnaissance Battalion was formed on 15 April 1958. 1st Reconnaissance Battalion was formed on 1 May 1958. 4th Reconnaissance Battalion was formed on 1 July 1962. 5th Reconnaissance Battalion was formed in 1966.

In July 1974, Force Reconnaissance was downsized to one active duty company. As a result, in March 1975 both 1st and 3rd Reconnaissance Battalions received a 23-man Force Reconnaissance platoon.

In February 2006, the Marine Special Operations Command (MARSOC) was formed. In August 2006, 2nd FORECON company was deactivated with the majority of its personnel transferred to MARSOC with two platoons reassigned to 2nd Reconnaissance Battalion to establish D Company. Two months later in October, 1st FORECON met the same fate, with the majority of its personnel transferred to MARSOC with two platoons reassigned to 1st Reconnaissance Battalion to establish D Company. The D companies in the Division Reconnaissance Battalions were designed to maintain and preserve a deep reconnaissance capability for the Marine Expeditionary Force (MEF). In 2007, 2nd Reconnaissance Battalion deactivated its D Company.

In 2008, the Commandant of the Marine Corps, directed that Force Reconnaissance companies be re-established from Division Reconnaissance Battalion personnel to support the three MEFs: I MEF, II MEF and III MEF. The companies were placed under the operational command of the MEF and under the administrative control of the Division Reconnaissance Battalion. In December 2008, 2nd Reconnaissance Battalion activated its Force Reconnaissance Company.

== Organization ==
=== Active ===
Logo	Name	Parent division	Location
	1st Reconnaissance Battalion	1st Marine Division	Camp Pendleton, California
	2nd Reconnaissance Battalion	2nd Marine Division	Camp Lejeune, North Carolina
	3rd Reconnaissance Battalion	3rd Marine Division	Camp Schwab, Okinawa, Japan
	4th Reconnaissance Battalion	4th Marine Division; Marine Forces Reserve	San Antonio, Texas

=== Deactivated ===
5th Reconnaissance Battalion	5th Marine Division	Camp Pendleton, California

== Structure ==
Each active duty reconnaissance battalion consists of five companies: a headquarters and service company, three reconnaissance companies and one force reconnaissance company. Each reconnaissance company has a company headquarters section and four reconnaissance platoons.

The reserve duty 4th Reconnaissance Battalion consists of six companies: a headquarters and service company and five reconnaissance companies. Each reconnaissance company has a company headquarters and three reconnaissance platoons.

Platoons normally consist of three reconnaissance teams and a headquarters team. A reconnaissance platoon is composed of 1 officer, 21 enlisted Marines, and 1 Navy corpsman for a total strength of 23 personnel. The platoon commander is a first lieutenant, the team leaders are sergeants and the platoon sergeant is a gunnery sergeant.

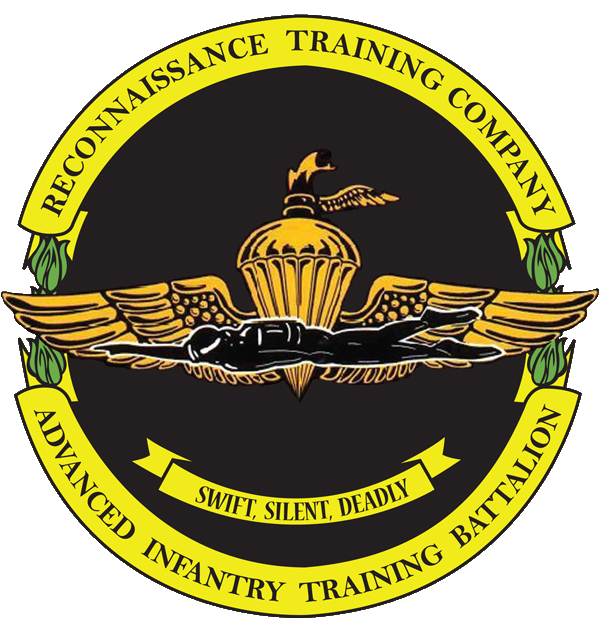
Reconnaissance Training Company logo

== Table of equipment ==
All amphibious recon Marines [Force and Division] and Corpsmen [IDC Corpsmen and SARC] are provided general issued equipment, these are the weapons that are generally used by both MAGTF Recon assets. These weapons are generally used by most other Marines in the infantry, except with minor modifications. Although Force Recon units receive the same equipment as their division recon counterparts, they also have equipment similar to that issued to comparable USSOCOM units. Force Recon are assigned to missions remote from any available fire support and fully rely on specialized weapons that are versatile enough to be flexible in the commander's area of interest.

- Data Automated Communications Terminal (DACT) – The DACT system, built and designed by Raytheon, is similar to a hand-held Personal Digital Assistant (PDA) that allows the commanders a Common Operational Picture (COP) to their platoons/teams through battalion/regimental levels. The DACT provides immediate person-to-person communications and feedback, such as positional data, situational awareness (SA), and communications tools providing Command and Control (C2) capabilities. The recon platoons/teams use two variants of the DACT systems, which are made available, the Mounted (M-DACT), which are mounting on tactical vehicles; and the Dismounted (D-DACT) for the Marines on foot or patrol.

=== Weapons ===
- OKC-3S bayonet
- M27 IAR
- M4/M4A1 service rifle *with/without M203 grenade launcher attachment (being phased out by the M27 IAR (see above) and M320 Grenade Launcher respectively)
- MEU (SOC) service pistol
- M40A5 sniper rifle *used by the detached Scout Sniper Platoons
- M110 Semi-Automatic Sniper System *used by the detached Scout Sniper Platoons
- M82A3 SASR .50 anti-material weapon
- Mk19, Mod 3 40 mm automatic grenade launcher
- M240 7.62-mm general-purpose machine gun (GPMG)
- M2HB .50-cal heavy machine gun
- M61 and M67 fragmentation grenade
- MK3A2 concussion grenade (offensive)
- M18 colored smoke and AN-M8 HC white smoke grenade
- ABC-M25A1/A2 Rriot control and ABC-M7A2/3 CS gas grenade
- AN-M14 TH3 incendiary and M15 white phosphorus grenade
- M69 practice hand grenade
- XM84 stun grenade

=== Combat and protective gear ===
The combative and protective gear is used by both recon assets of MAFTF. However, again, there are 'additional' equipment in the Force Recon's T/E to meet their assignments in deep operations and/or direct action missions. And to include FORECON's necessary equipment that are capable of being jumped out of aircraft; and long-range communications due to their operability at greater distances than Division Recon geographically assigned boundaries.

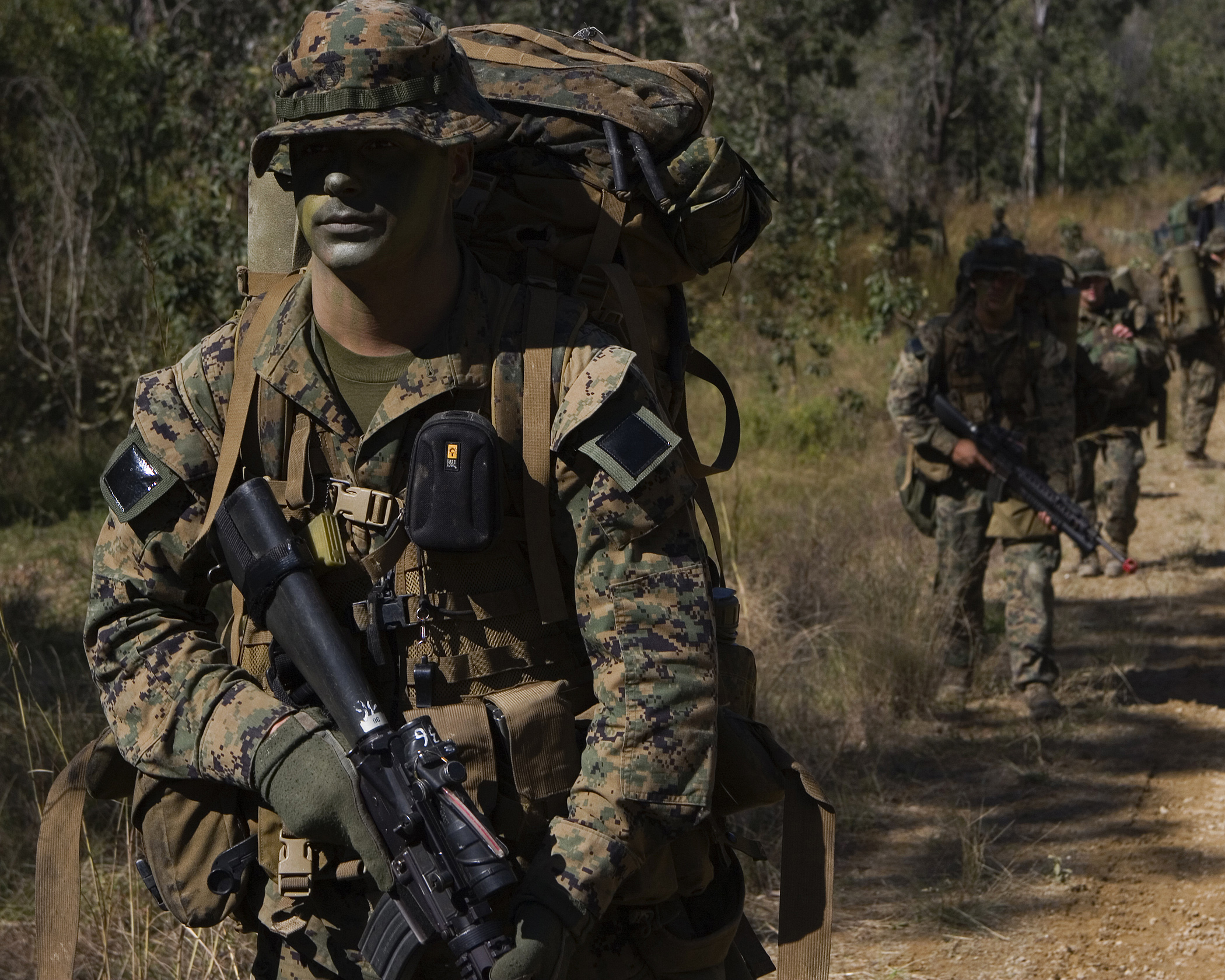
Marines wearing the full combat gear

- Utility uniform – Marine Corps Combat Utility Uniform (MCCUU), with MARPAT camouflage digital pixelated pattern in woodland and desert variants.
- Load Bearing Vest (LBV) – The vest could be the current standard-issue, second-generation, MOLLE fighting load carrier vest (FLC) or the late 1980s to early 1990s IIFS non-modular load bearing vest (LBV-88). The latter is more popular for durability. An operator may also use a third-party LBV, and chestrigs are popular.
- Rucksack – A large backpack for items accessed less often. Marines have publicly voiced a preference for ALICE packs, introduced in 1974, over the newer MOLLE packs, but individual operators may buy third-party packs which surpass both products in durability. The MOLLE packs were replaced by the Arc'teryx-designed ILBE.
- First aid kit – A personal-sized first aid kit that is carried usually fastened onto webbing of the rucksack or personal vest carrying system.
- Tactical knee pads and elbow pads – For protection and comfort as Marines move into various firing positions.
- Boots – Equipment-bearing hiking boots or specialized hiking shoes.
- Combat Helmet and tactical goggles – Lightweight Helmet or other Kevlar helmets
- Nomex balaclava – A hood with a large opening for the eyes. NOMEX is a flame retardant fabric that was developed during post-Korean War era for use by aircraft pilots that has since been found useful for many other applications.
- Ballistic vest – Interceptor body armor. Marine Corps's Modular Tactical Vest (MTV)

=== Special equipment ===
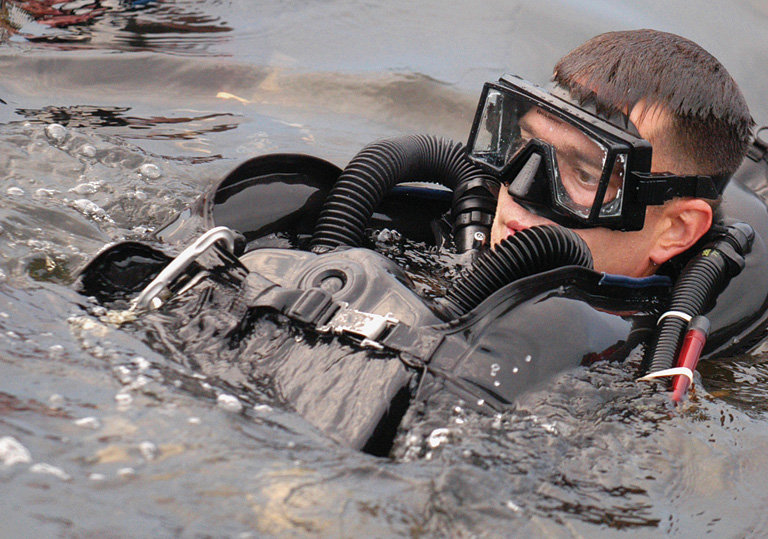
Recon Marines training with the Draeger MK 25 rebreather.

Most of the recon patrols or insertions are either in maritime, amphibious environments or on the ground. They have to rely on equipment that is essential to their mission. Both recon assets contain a Table of Equipment (T/E) that has combatant diving equipment. A Marine within a recon platoon will be assigned as the "Special Equipment NCO", fully responsible for the procurement and maintenance of the equipment when operating in the field.

Force Recon's Parachute Loft, or Paraloft section has in addition to their "mission-essential" equipment, the Parachutist Individual Equipment Kit (PIEK) and Single Action Release Personal Equipment Lowering Equipment (SARPELS) for their parachute capabilities.

==== Combatant diving ====
The scuba equipment listed under the T/E set by the US Navy for the Marine Corps reconnaissance:

- Draeger MK 25 rebreather unit – The rebreather unit is a pure oxygen SCUBA system that scrubs the diver's exhalation of carbon dioxide and recycles the remaining oxygen into the breathing loop. Since it is closed-circuit, it does not release a trail of bubbles unless the diver is surfacing faster than the oxygen is consumed. Bubbles could reveal the presence and location of the diver and compromise the mission.
- Deep See Squeeze Lock – diving knife with a 3 in (7.6 cm) beta-titanium blade. Useful when snagged in fishing nets or other submerged entanglements, many of which are nearly non-visible underwater.
- Aqua Lung Military Snorkel Flex Tube – Standard-issue snorkel.
- Aqua Lung Rocket Fin – Standard-issue swimfins.
- Aqua Lung Look Mask and Mythos Mask – Standard-issue diving mask. Mythos mask contains a blow-out, one-way valve at the nasal piece to expel water that is in the goggles.
- Diver's Weight Belt, (WB67/WB68) – Weight belt is used to neutralize excess buoyancy under the water.
- Case Soft Diving Weights, (September-M-2/Sep-M-5) – Additional weights that can be released individually to proper buoyant level.
- Scubapro Twin Jet Fins – Split fins are fairly new to the Marine Corps T/E, since 2000. They have been tested to prove that the split fin design allows slightly better maneuverability if one had to immediately run during unexpected enemy contact once ashore. It also has excellent water propulsion to push the recon Marines and Corpsmen to shore.
- Aqua Lung Impulse 2 Snorkel – This snorkel contains a one-way valve that prevents water from entering the diver's mouth.
- UDT life preserver – Standard-issued life preserver.

== Creed ==
Realizing it is my choice and my choice alone to be a Reconnaissance Marine, I accept all challenges involved with this profession. Forever shall I strive to maintain the tremendous reputation of those who went before me.

Exceeding beyond the limitations set down by others shall be my goal. Sacrificing personal comforts and dedicating myself to the completion of the reconnaissance mission shall be my life. Physical fitness, mental attitude, and high ethics—The title of Recon Marine is my honor.

Conquering all obstacles, both large and small, I shall never quit. To quit, to surrender, to give up is to fail. To be a Recon Marine is to surpass failure; To overcome, to adapt and to do whatever it takes to complete the mission.

On the battlefield, as in all areas of life, I shall stand tall above the competition. Through professional pride, integrity, and teamwork, I shall be the example for all Marines to emulate.

Never shall I forget the principles I accepted to become a Recon Marine. Honor, Perseverance, Spirit and Heart. A Recon Marine can speak without saying a word and achieve what others can only imagine.

== See also ==
- Marine Raider Regiment
- United States Marine Corps Force Reconnaissance
- United States Marine Corps Light Armored Reconnaissance
- Radio Reconnaissance Platoon
- Scout Sniper
- Surveillance and Target Acquisition
