= PHIBRON =

Type of organization

PHIBRON is a United States Navy abbreviation for Amphibious Squadron. It is a tactical and administrative organization composed of amphibious assault shipping to transport troops and their equipment for an amphibious assault operation.

Before the advent of modern helicopter-oriented amphibious warfare, the amphibious squadron was made up differently, depending on the era. During the 1960s, a typical squadron might consist of an Attack Transport (APA/LPA), a Dock Landing Ship (LSD), an Attack Cargo Ship (AKA/LKA), one or two Landing Ships, Tank, (LST) and, especially if there were only one LST, a High Speed Transport (APD). The APA carried troops and Landing Craft Vehicle Personnel(LCVP)s in which to land them, plus a few Landing Craft Mechanized(LCM)s for bigger loads. The AKA carried cargo and an assortment of LCVPs and LCMs with which to land it. The LSD carried boats. The LST carried tanks and other rolling stock, and had the ability to discharge its cargo directly onto the beach. The destroyer-like APD provided limited gunfire support and fast defense of the squadron. It frequently also carried a UDT unit or other similar troops. The Landing Platform Helicopter (LPH) replaced the APA in the late 1960s and provided helicopters to land troops and supplies inland, beyond the beach.

In modern times, a U.S. PHIBRON usually consists of three amphibious ships, typically one Landing Helicopter Dock(LHD), a Dock landing ship(LSD) and an Amphibious transport dock(LPD). When the ships of a PHIBRON are loaded up with the forces of a Marine Expeditionary Unit and some additional Navy units (including a Tactical Air Control Squadron (TACRON) detachment and landing craft from a Naval Beach Group two or more of either an Assault Craft Units (ACU), Beachmaster Units (BMU), Special Warfare Group (SWG), Explosive Ordinance Disposal Team (EOD), and Fleet Surgical Team (FST). The unit is designated as an Amphibious ready group(ARG) for deployment capability. The officer in charge of a PHIBRON is designated COMPHIBRON (#) or Commander Amphibious Squadron (#) and acts as the commodore for all ships in the ARG.

== List of United States Navy amphibious squadrons ==
=== Active ===
- Amphibious Squadron 1 - Stationed in San Diego, CA
- Amphibious Squadron 4 - Stationed in Norfolk, VA
- Amphibious Squadron 5 - Stationed in San Diego, CA
- Amphibious Squadron 6 - Stationed in Norfolk, VA
- Amphibious Squadron 7 - Stationed in San Diego, CA (Composed of USS Makin Island, USS Anchorage, and USS John P. Murtha)
- Amphibious Squadron 8 - Stationed in Norfolk, VA
- Amphibious Squadron 9 - Stationed in San Diego, CA
- Amphibious Squadron 11 - Stationed in Sasebo, Japan (Composed of USS America, USS New Orleans, USS Green Bay, USS Rushmore, and USS Ashland)

=== Disestablished ===
- Amphibious Squadron 2 - Stationed in Norfolk, VA, disestablished in 2010
- Amphibious Squadron 3 - Stationed in San Diego, CA, disestablished on 3 March 2023.
- Amphibious Squadron 10 - Stationed in Little Creek, VA disestablished 1974
