= Direct action (military) =

Part of military special operations

Direct action (DA) is a term used in the context of military special operations for small-scale raids, ambushes, acts of sabotage, and similar actions.

== United States ==
The US Department of Defense defines direct action as "short-duration strikes and other small-scale offensive actions conducted as a special operation in hostile, denied, or politically sensitive environments and which employ specialized military capabilities to seize, destroy, capture, exploit, recover, or damage designated targets." Direct action differs from conventional offensive actions in the level of physical and political risk, operational techniques, and the degree of discriminate and precise use of force to achieve specific objectives.

The US military and many of its allies consider DA one of the basic special operations missions. Some units specialize in it, such as the Navy SEALs and 75th Ranger Regiment, and other units, such as US Army Special Forces, have DA capabilities but focus more on other operations.
