= Huhtiniemi mass grave =

Mass grave site in Finland

Huhtiniemi mass grave is a mass grave site with two graves and at least 15 bodies in Huhtiniemi, Lappeenranta, eastern Finland. A further 10 bodies were excavated in 1971, leading to the more recent studies, and fragments of two other individuals were found in 2005 in rough examinations by City of Lappeenranta.

== Background ==
According to persistent rumours, the Finnish Army held secret courts-martial for deserters in Lappeenranta during the summer of 1944 after the Soviet Fourth strategic offensive in the Continuation War. It is assumed that convicted deserters were then moved to Huhtiniemi, executed by firing squad, and buried in unmarked graves. Because no records of the activities of the Greater Saimaa's regional court martial during the year 1944 have been found, some believe the records have been deliberately destroyed. According to information attributed to Toivo Tapanainen, the supposed chief judge of the courts, the number of executions was between 500 and 600 The Finnish law was only changed in July 1944, permitting a death penalty for desertion. If the rumour is valid, such tribunal in June 1944 would have technically been an illicit and unconstitutional kangaroo court, and any death sentences imposed judicially would have been outright murders.

While the true purpose of the mass grave(s) has not been verified, the grave site itself has been discovered. In 1971, during plumbing duct installation, a worker found a human skull. According to an article in news paper Etelä-Saimaa, a mass grave was found. At the time, the site was believed to date back to the Finnish Civil War of 1918, even though the site was not investigated in detail. These findings have since been lost. It is assumed the bones have been destroyed.

== Later developments ==
In 2005, Juha Portaankorva, a reporter for the Finnish Broadcasting Company, and the Lauri Törni Tradition Guild, planned to excavate the area, but this plan was delayed due to lack of time and money. Some excavations were conducted by the city of Lappeenranta in December 2005, but using a very harsh methodology (excavation machine) and only a few bone fragments were found. Thus it was seen appropriate that proper archaeological studies should be conducted at the site.

The latest excavations were started by the University of Helsinki's Department of Archaeology and Forensic Department on 2 October 2006 funded by the Finnish Cultural Foundation. Soon afterward excavation team found fragments of human bones and shells, although most probably not connected to each other.

Slightly later, on 17 October, it was reported that remains of at least 11 people, all male and aged early twenties to middle-aged, had been discovered in a mass grave within the Huhtiniemi camp ground. Bodies were all buried without coffins in a single row, lying on their backs. On a later date Finnish newspaper Ilta-Sanomat reported that another mass grave (of undetermined number of bodies) was located right next to the first one. Also a third, partly destroyed mass grave was located parallel to the other two.

The police officially took over the investigations of the remains after the mass grave was located as there was the possibility that bodies might have been connected to 2nd world war events. Police informed that the dating of the mass grave will be published in end of 2006.

The very next day, on 18 October 2006, there was some interesting political over reaction to the turn of the events, as the Finnish Prime Minister Matti Vanhanen suggested establishing a truth commission for investigation of the Huhtiniemi mass grave. Despite all the media hassle, the archaeological remains were carefully excavated by a Finnish forensics team from the Departments of Archaeology and Forensic Medicine, University of Helsinki. Human remains were examined thoroughly at the Forensic Department, and the archaeological research report prepared at the Department of Archaeology.

On 28 October 2006, Swedish magazine Dagens Nyheter said that the bodies are probably originally Russian. There was a lot of Russian military in Lappeenranta area during the Russian rule in the 19th century, the skeletons were buried in a traditional orthodox position and many of them were wearing orthodox crosses around their neck, as an anonymous informant from the Finnish Criminal Police had told the newspaper. Police informed later that this interpretation is probably the right one, and supports the preliminary notes made by the University of Helsinki's forensic archaeological team during the excavation. In April 2007, the report of the investigations was finalized. According to the research team, radiocarbon dating and archeological methods show that the bones date back to the 19th century. The bodies most likely belong to the Russian servicemen who died in the garrisons of the area. The cause of death was most likely disease, as the bodies show no record of violence.

Further excavations by the Department of Archeology, University of Helsinki have not shown evidence of any further mass graves in Huhtiniemi area. The research team reported in October 2007 that all possible mass grave sites in Huhtiniemi area have been examined and found to be empty of human remains.
