= 10th Special Forces Group (United States) =

US Army Special Forces unit

10th Special Forces Group (Airborne)
- 10th Special Forces Group (Airborne) Beret Flash
- Active: 19 June 1952 – present
- Country: United States
- Branch: United States Army
- Type: Special Forces
- Role: Primary tasks: Unconventional Warfare (UW); Foreign Internal Defense (FID); Direct Action (DA); Counter-Insurgency (COIN); Special Reconnaissance (SR); Counter-Terrorism (CT); Information Operations (IO); Counterproliferation of WMD (CP); Security Force Assistance (SFA)
- Size: 4 battalions
- Part of: 1st Special Forces Command
- Garrison/HQ: Fort Carson, Colorado
- Motto: "De oppresso liber" (to free the oppressed)
- Engagements: Congo; Somalia; Gulf War; War in Afghanistan; Iraq War; Operation Freedom's Sentinel

Commanders
- Notable commanders: COL Aaron Bank; COL Paris Davis

Insignia
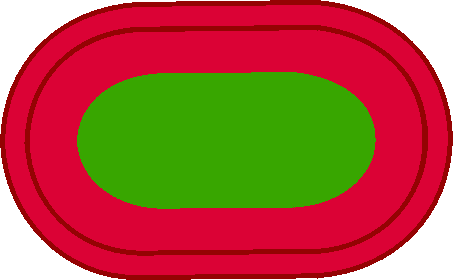
- Background trimming

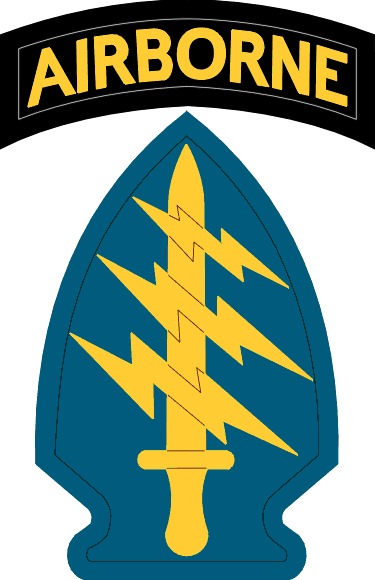
- 1st Special Forces Command (Airborne) Shoulder Sleeve Insignia, worn by all 1st SFC(A) units

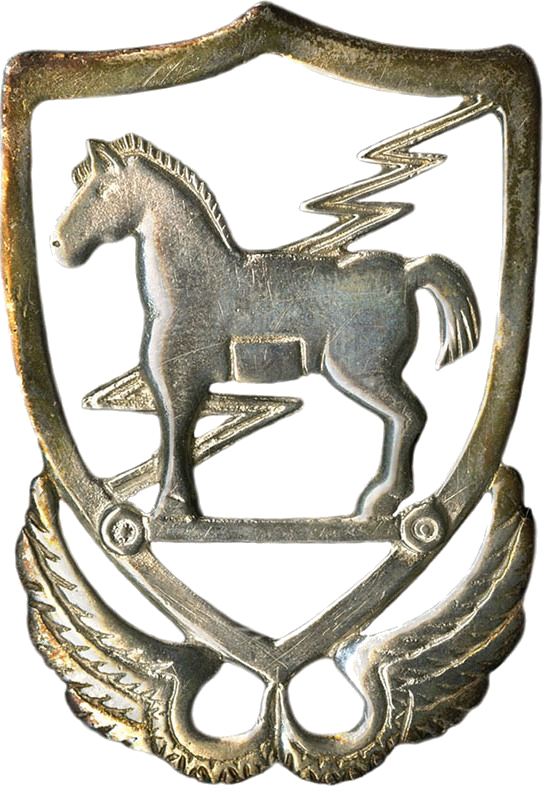
- Former 10th Special Forces Group Beret Badge, worn from 1955–1962

- Former 10th SFG(A) recognition bar, worn by non–special operations qualified soldiers in lieu of a beret flash from c. 1960s–1984

The 10th Special Forces Group (Airborne) (10th SFG (A), or 10th Group) is an active duty United States Army Special Forces (SF) Group. 10th Group is designed to deploy and execute nine doctrinal missions: unconventional warfare (UW), foreign internal defense (FID), direct action (DA), counterinsurgency, special reconnaissance, counterterrorism, information operations, counter-proliferation of weapon of mass destruction, and security force assistance. 10th Group is responsible for operations within the EUCOM area of responsibility, as part of Special Operations Command Europe (SOCEUR).

In 2009, as part of a new SOCOM directive, the group is now also responsible for operations within the AFRICOM area of responsibility. 10th SFG(A) was deployed to Saudi Arabia in 1991 during the First Persian Gulf War, and has been heavily involved in the war on terrorism, deploying to Georgia, North Africa, Afghanistan, and consistently to Iraq.

== Creation ==
The 10th Special Forces Group (Airborne) Headquarters and Headquarters Company (HHC) was activated on 19 May 1952 and 10th SFG was activated on 19 June 1952, at Fort Bragg, North Carolina, under the command of Colonel Aaron Bank.

The first Special Forces Course graduated in 1952 and the Group grew to 1,700 personnel. In September 1953, 782 members of the Group deployed to Germany and established the Group headquarters at Lenggries in Bavaria. An additional 99 personnel deployed to Korea where they were assigned to the 8240th Army Unit which was training anti-Communist North Korean partisans on the off-shore islands. The remaining personnel stayed at Fort Bragg where they formed the 77th Special Forces Group (redesignated as the 7th SFG in 1960). In 1968, the majority of the unit transferred to Fort Devens, Massachusetts, with the exception of 1st Battalion, which remained in Germany. Between 1994 and 1995, 10th SFG(A) moved to Fort Carson, Colorado, which remains its current home.

10th Group began training with unconventional warfare groups from friendly countries in the 1960s, beginning with NATO allies. The group has also trained various components of the militaries of several Middle Eastern countries, including Lebanon, Jordan, Yemen, Iran, as well as Kurdish tribesmen. Units of the 10th SFG(A) have participated in humanitarian missions to the Congo, Somalia, and Rwanda.

== History ==
=== 1950s ===
In 1950, the Lodge Act was passed, which provided for the recruiting of foreign nationals into the United States military. It was originally planned that half of the members of the Special Forces would be native Europeans. Many of the initial members of the 10th SFG (A) were Lodge Act recruits, who were strenuously anti-Communist. Among the more notable of these men was Major Larry Thorne, a former Finnish Army soldier and Waffen-SS veteran who was awarded the Mannerheim Cross during World War II.

The Big Picture, "Phantom Fighters"
The first public U.S. Army film describing the previously classified 10th Special Forces Group (Airborne), 1959

The 10th SFG (A) was constituted 19 May 1952 and activated on 11 June 1952, at Fort Bragg, North Carolina, under the command of Colonel Aaron Bank. The group was split in 1953, with one half being sent to Germany, while the other half remained at Fort Bragg to form the core of the 77th Special Forces Group (redesignated as the 7th SFG in 1960). By the end of June 1952, the group had 122 officers and men assigned. Many had been OSS, Ranger, and Airborne troopers during World War II. The group's mission was to conduct partisan warfare behind Soviet lines in the event of a Soviet invasion of Europe.

On 10 November 1953, the 10th SFG (A) was split in half, with one half deployed to Bad Tölz and Lenggries in West Germany, and the other remaining in Fort Bragg to become the 77th Special Forces Group (which in 1960 became the 7th Special Forces Group). The green beret was authorized for wear by Col. William E. Ekman, the group commander, in 1954, and it became group policy. By 1955, every soldier in the unit wore a green beret as part of the uniform. However, the Department of the Army (DA) did not recognize the beret as headgear. The DA banned the wear of the beret, but in 1961 it was restored by President Kennedy, a major champion of the Special Forces. The 10th Group encountered publicity for the first time in 1955 when The New York Times published two articles about the unit, describing them as a "liberation" force designed to fight behind enemy lines. Pictures showed soldiers of the group wearing their berets, with their faces blacked out to conceal their identities.

=== 1960s ===
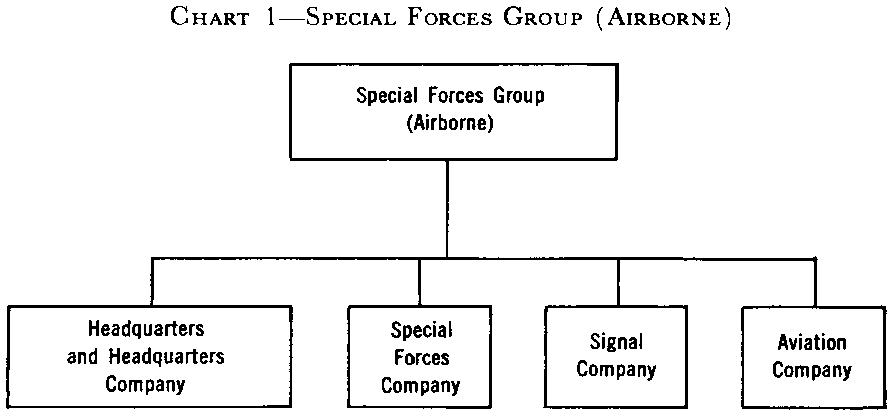
Special Forces Group organization in the Vietnam Era

The A-teams of 10th Group began exchange training with unconventional forces in friendly countries, including United Kingdom, Germany, France, Norway, Spain, Italy, and Greece. In the summer of 1960, 10th Group deployed to the newly independent Congo, to evacuate Americans and Europeans to Leopoldville, where there would be a larger evacuation, led by Belgian paratroopers. The group evacuated 239 civilians without a single casualty in only nine days.

As the United States became increasingly involved in Vietnam, counter-insurgency became the primary focus of the Special Forces, rather than the traditional unconventional warfare. While the 10th SFG(A) was never deployed to Vietnam, the soldiers and officers assigned to it did rotate through the country as part of different special forces groups. During the Vietnam War, detachments of 10th Group began training Middle Eastern special warfare forces. In Jordan, B Detachment established the first airborne school, and King Hussein attended the graduation parachute jump. In 1963, Company C of 10th Group trained 350 officers and NCOs of a guerrilla force fighting the socialist government in Yemen. Detachments also traveled to Iran to train the Iranian Special Forces, along with Kurdish tribesmen in the mountains of Iran. A-Teams also trained Turkish and Pakistani special forces. In 1968, 10th Group, minus the 1st Battalion, was transferred to Fort Devens, Massachusetts. 1st Battalion remained in Bad Tölz, Germany.

=== 1970s – 1980s ===
Following the military cuts after the end of the Vietnam War, operational deployments decreased in both number and frequency. However 10th Group still deployed frequently to Europe to train with NATO allies. From 11 May 1983 to 25 October 1985, 10th Group deployed 17 Mobile Training Teams (MTT) to Lebanon, to support the Lebanese Army. The teams created a training program for over 5,000 officers, NCOs, and soldiers, which included basic training sites, unit training, unit combined arms live fire training, and urban live fire training. The entry of the Syrian Army into Lebanon ended the program prematurely. An MTT from the 1st Battalion, Bad Tölz, Germany deployed to Somalia for four months to conduct disaster relief operations in June 1985. In 1986, a detachment of 10th Group trained the nucleus of the Nigerian Airborne forces.

The 10th Group was the leading force behind the development of the M25 sniper rifle in the late 1980s, at Fort Devens. The rifle is an improvement on the previous M21 sniper rifle, itself a modification of the M14 semi-automatic rifle. During this era the 10th Group acted as the annual training (AT) host for its sister unit in the Army Reserve, the 11th Group. ATs would typically take place during the summer months. As part of its AT support, the 10th Group ran a two-week Basic Airborne course for new 11th Group personnel who were not yet Airborne qualified. The 10th also ran a two-week jumpmaster course for 11th Group personnel. Typically the 10th would run an Airborne course one year and a jumpmaster course during the next. For example, the 10th ran a Basic Airborne course for 11th Group personnel in July 1978 and a jumpmaster course in July 1979. In addition to 11th Group personnel, the 10th sent its own support personnel through its in-house Airborne course, and members of the ARNG's 20th Group were known to attend as well.

=== 1990s – 2000s ===
Following the Iraqi invasion of Kuwait, an MTT deployed to Kuwait to train the Saudi Arabian National Guard. During the Battle of Khafji, the MTT accompanied the SANG forces into battle, coordinated troop movements, called in airstrikes, and assisted with artillery fire support. Other elements of 10th Group deployed to southeast Turkey in support of operations Desert Shield/Desert Storm. The Boston Herald reported: "The 10th Special Forces Group's penchant for secrecy is so exacting the base publicist didn't know the unit had gone to war until they were on their way home from Operation Desert Storm." Following the end of the Gulf War, Saddam Hussein turned his attention to Iraq's Kurdish minority, causing over half of a million Kurds to flee into the mountains on the Turkish-Iraqi border. Under the leadership of Colonel William Tangney, all three battalions of 10th Group were deployed to the area for Operation Provide Comfort, a UN humanitarian effort. 10th Group coordinated the ground relief effort, and was credited by General Galvin, the EUCOM commander, as having "saved half a million Kurds from extinction".

During Operation Restore Hope, 10th Group deployed a Coalition Support Team to support the 1st Belgian Para-Commando Battalion. In addition to supporting the Para-Commando unit, the CST assisted the 10th Mountain Division, and provided security for meetings with Somali leaders. Following the ethnic conflict in Rwanda, 10th Group deployed to Entebbe airfield, Uganda where they assisted displaced persons in returning to their homes.

On 2 September 1994, 2nd Battalion, 10th SFG(A) transferred to Fort Carson, Colorado, followed by 3rd Battalion on 20 July 1995. The group headquarters moved to Fort Carson on 15 September 1995, ending a 27-year presence in Massachusetts. Affiliated for operations with Special Operations Command – Europe, 10th Group is continuing to conduct Joint Combined Exchange Training and FID/anti-terrorist operations as part of Operation Enduring Freedom – Trans Sahara. Such activities have included training the Military of Mali and the Military of Mauritania. The 1st and 3rd Battalions of 10th Group also participated in training in Senegal in 2006, along with the 352d Special Operations Group of the US Air Force. 10th SFG(A) has also deployed numerous times in support of Operation Enduring Freedom and Operation Iraqi Freedom, but mostly to Iraq, since the start of the war on terrorism. 10th SFG(A) and CIA's Special Activities Division Paramilitary Officers were the first to enter Iraq prior to the invasion. During Operation Viking Hammer, they organized the Kurdish Peshmerga to defeat Ansar al-Islam, an ally of al-Qa'ida, for control of a territory in Northeastern Iraq that was completely under Ansar al-Islam's control. This battle, one of the most important engagements for Special Forces since Vietnam, led to the elimination of a substantial number of terrorists and the discovery of a chemical weapons facility at Sargat (the only facility of its type discovered in the Iraq war). Three Silver Stars and six Bronze Stars for valor were conferred for this engagement. These terrorists would have been part of the subsequent insurgency had they not been eliminated during this battle, which could be called the Tora Bora of Iraq. While several key leaders escaped into Iran, it was a sound defeat for al-Qaeda and Ansar al-Islam. The Americans then led the Peshmerga against Saddam's northern Army. This effort kept Saddam's forces, including 13 Armored Divisions, in the north and denied them the ability to redeploy to contest the invasion force coming from the south. This effort likely saved the lives of hundreds, if not thousands, of coalition service members.

== Subordinate units ==
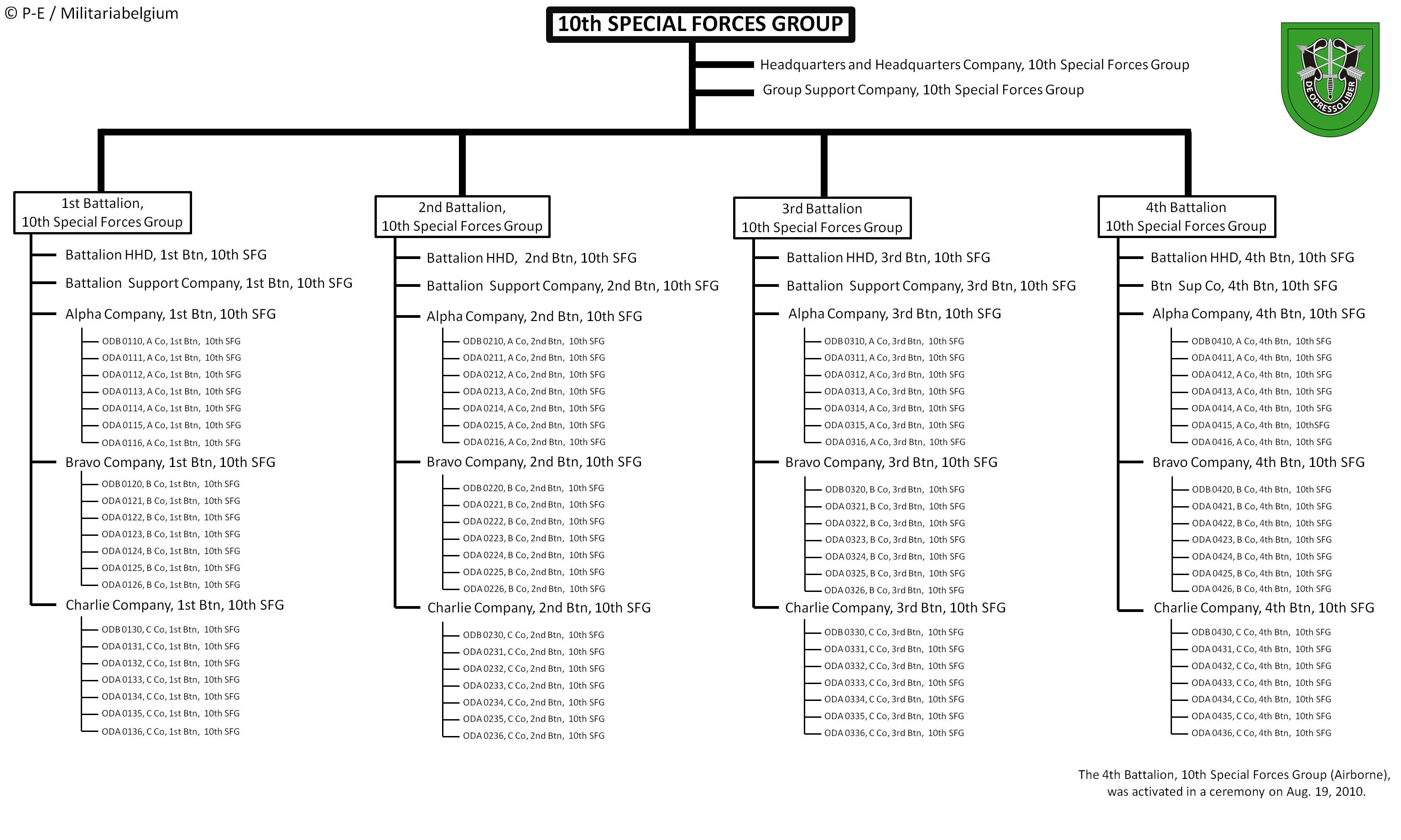
Current structure of the 10th SFG(A)

- Headquarters and Headquarters Company
- Group Support Company
- 1st Battalion – stationed at Panzer Kaserne Böblingen-Sindelfingen of Region Stuttgart, Germany
- 2nd Battalion
- 3rd Battalion
- 4th Battalion
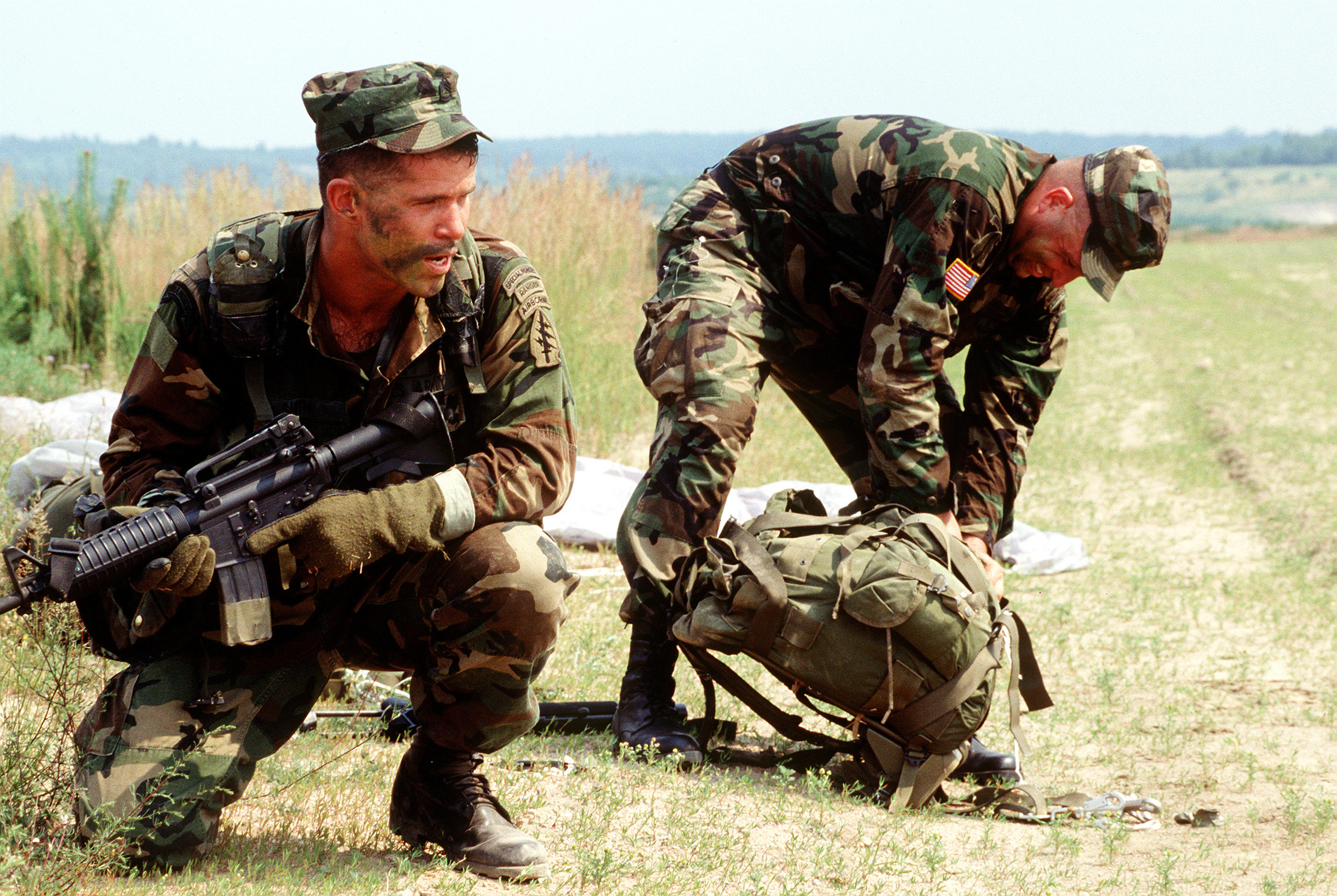
A 10th SFG (A) operator using an M4 carbine left-handed during an exercise with another soldier in July 1995.

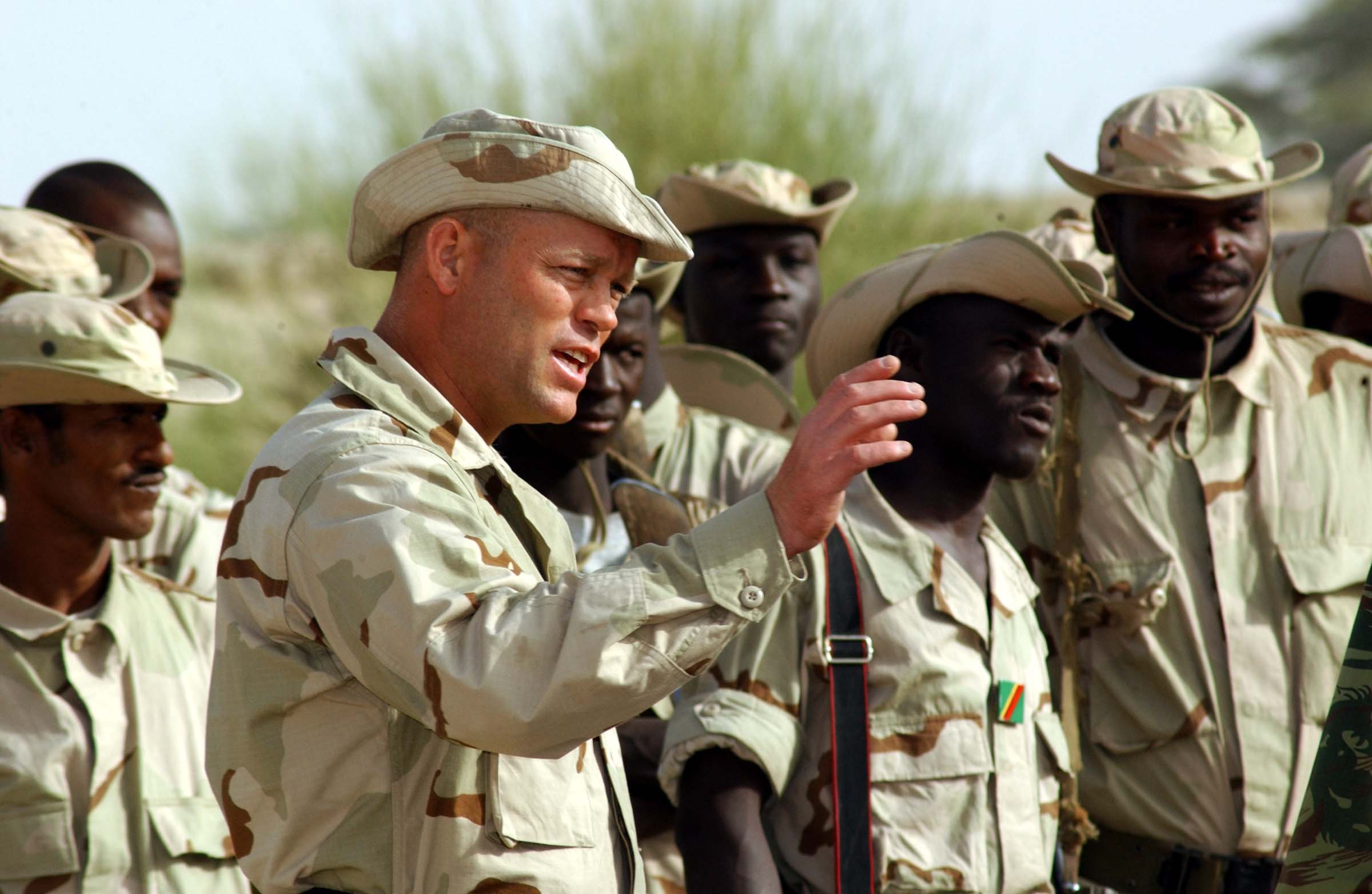
A 10th SFG (A) operator training Mali soldiers.

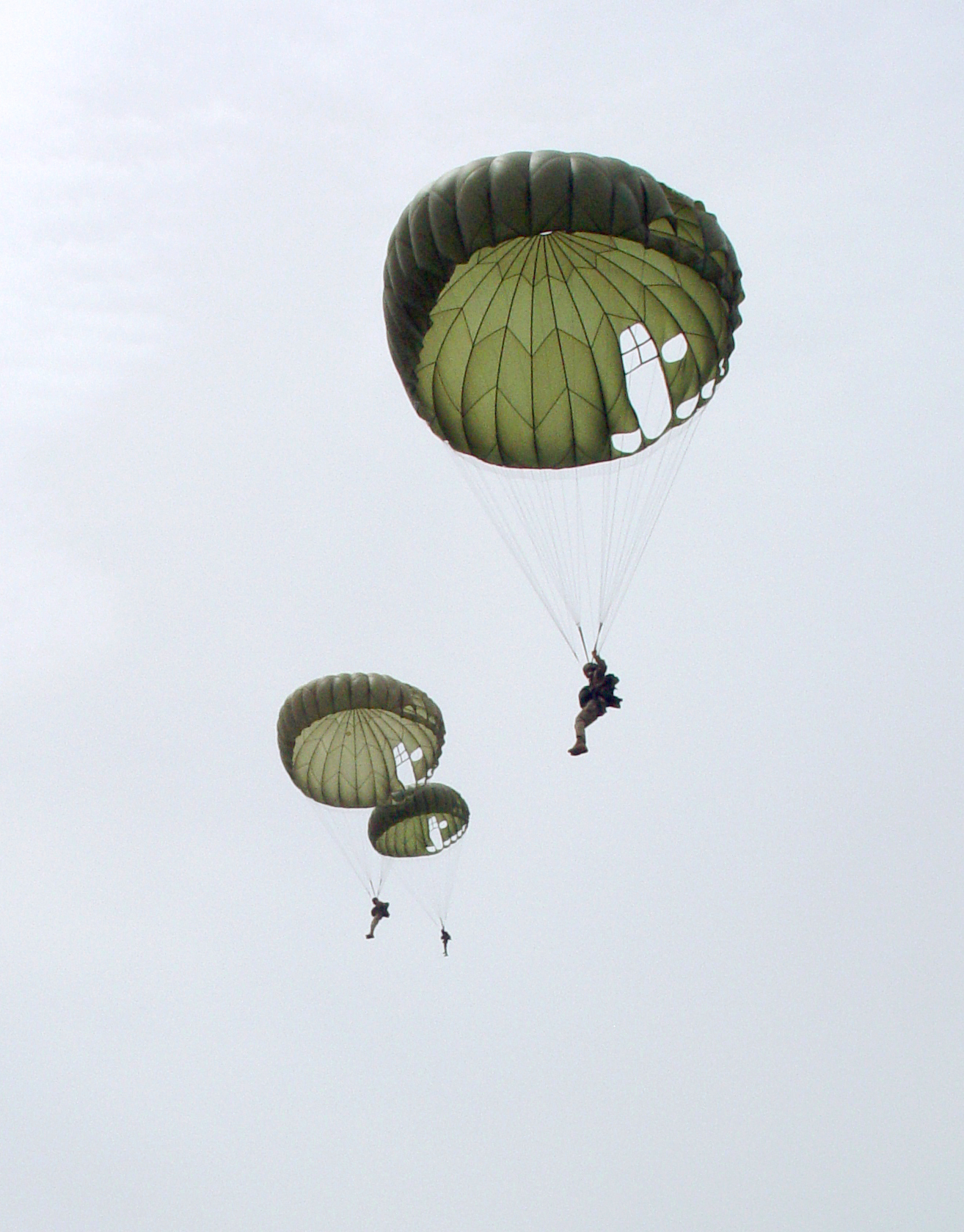
Training parachute jump in Mali.

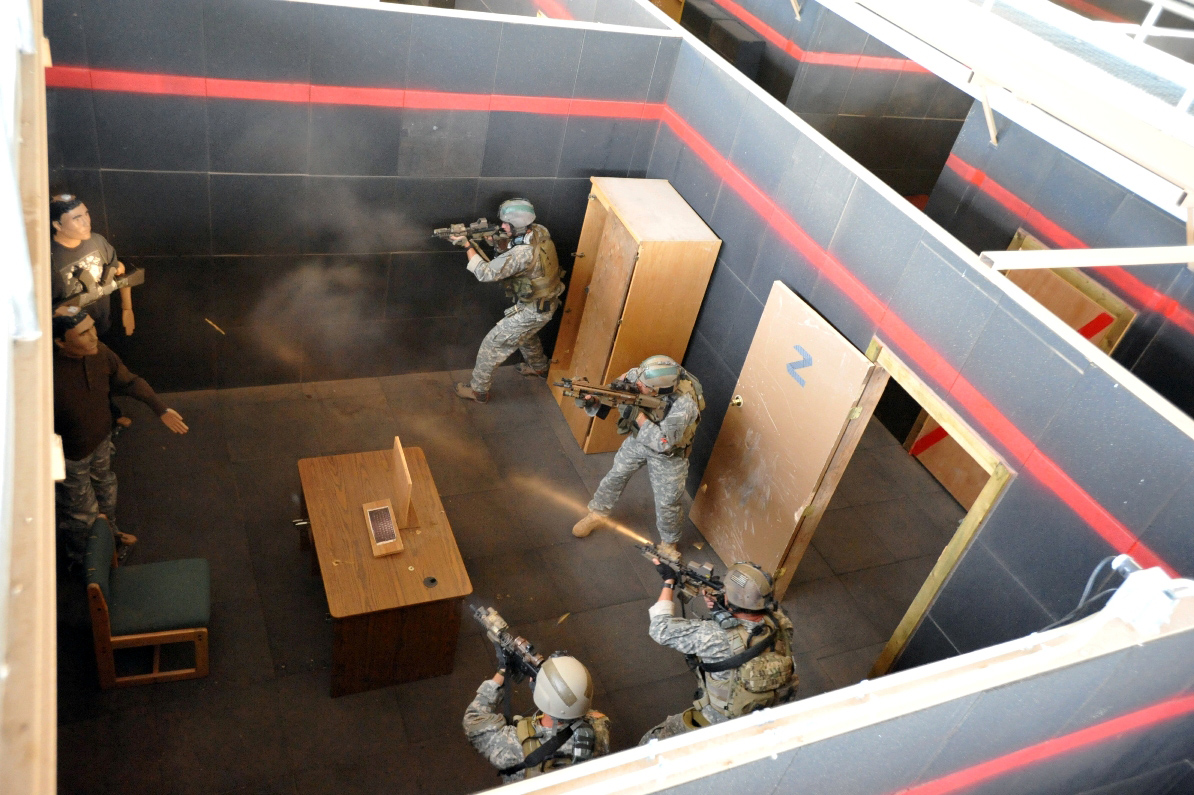
Special Forces operators from 3rd Battalion, A 10th SFG (A), conduct shoot-house training at Fort Carson in September 2009

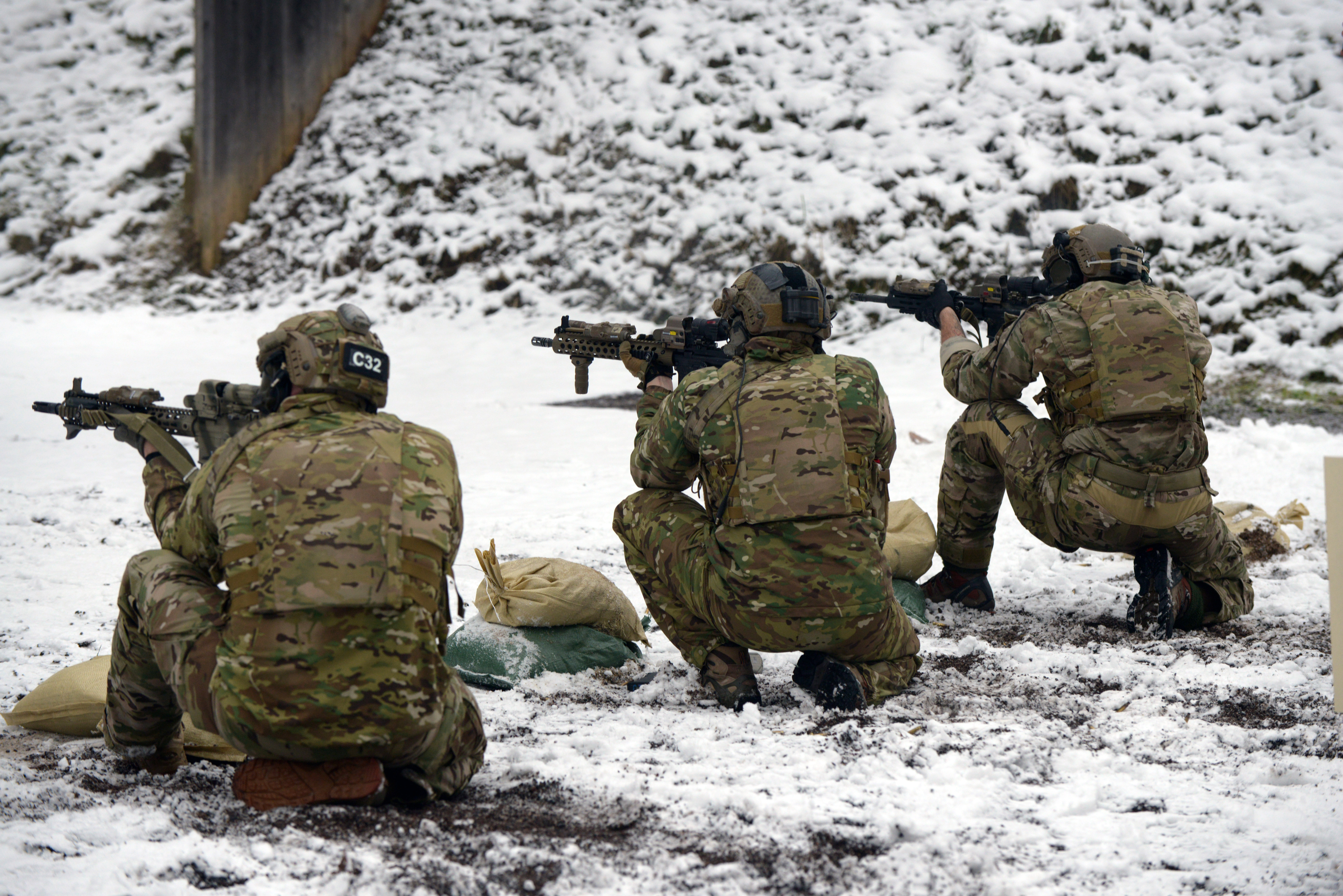
1st Battalion, 10th SFG (A) operators practice firing SOPMOD M4A1 carbine variants at the Panzer Range Complex.

== Notable members ==
- Colonel Aaron Bank – The "Father" of Army Special Forces and first commanding officer of the 10th Special Forces Group (Airborne).
- Colonel Paris Davis - commander of 10th Group and Medal of Honor recipient
- CSM Billy Waugh - CSM of MACV-SOG, member of CIA Special Activities Division Task Force Dagger, which set the stage for cooperation between the 5th Special Forces Group and the Afghan Northern Alliance in 2001. Colone Paris Davis was awarded the Medal of Honor for rescuing him in Vietnam.
- Captain Peter R. Debbins, 1st Battalion, accused of spying for the Russian government.
- Master Sergeant Gary Gordon – Went on to service with Delta Force and was posthumously awarded the Medal of Honor for his actions during the Battle of Mogadishu. He was portrayed by the Danish actor Nikolaj Coster-Waldau in the 2001 film Black Hawk Down.
- Lieutenant Colonel Francisco Rubio – a US Army lieutenant colonel and helicopter pilot, flight surgeon, and NASA astronaut.
- Colonel Jerry Sage – Early 1960s commander and World War II OSS veteran captured by Germans during the Kasserine Pass battle. While a prisoner at the Stalag Luft III, he played a major role in the famed "Great Escape" as the prisoners' security Chief before American prisoners were transferred to a separate compound. Colonel Sage was portrayed by actor Steve McQueen in the 1963 film The Great Escape.
- Major Larry Thorne – Finnish soldier and Waffen-SS veteran who fought the Soviet Army during the Winter War and the Continuation War, immigrated to the United States after World War II and joined the US Army under the Lodge-Philbin Act. 10th Group honors him yearly by presenting the Larry Thorne Award to the best Operational Detachment-Alpha in the command. Thorne is the only known Waffen-SS veteran to have been buried in Arlington National Cemetery.
- Lieutenant General Kenneth Tovo – Commander of 3rd BN, 10th SFG (A) and led the invasion of Iraq. Went on to become the Commander of 10th SFG (A) and US Army Special Operations Command
- Sergeant First Class Nathan Weber – Olympic Bobsledder. Competed in 2018 Winter Olympics in Pyeongchang, Korea. Currently retired from service.
