= Aarnio =

Aarnio is a Finnish surname. It was registered by the Suomalaisuuden Liitto in 1921 and has 2,084 known bearers. Notable people with the surname include:

- Eero Aarnio (born 1932), Finnish interior designer
- Henri Aarnio (born 1993), Finnish badminton player
- Matti Aarnio (1901–1984), Finnish military officer
- Reino Aarnio (1912–1988), American architect
- Tero Aarnio (born 1984), Finnish motorcycle speedway rider
