= Koskikeskus =

Coordinates: 65°01′14″N 25°28′00″E

- District of Oulu
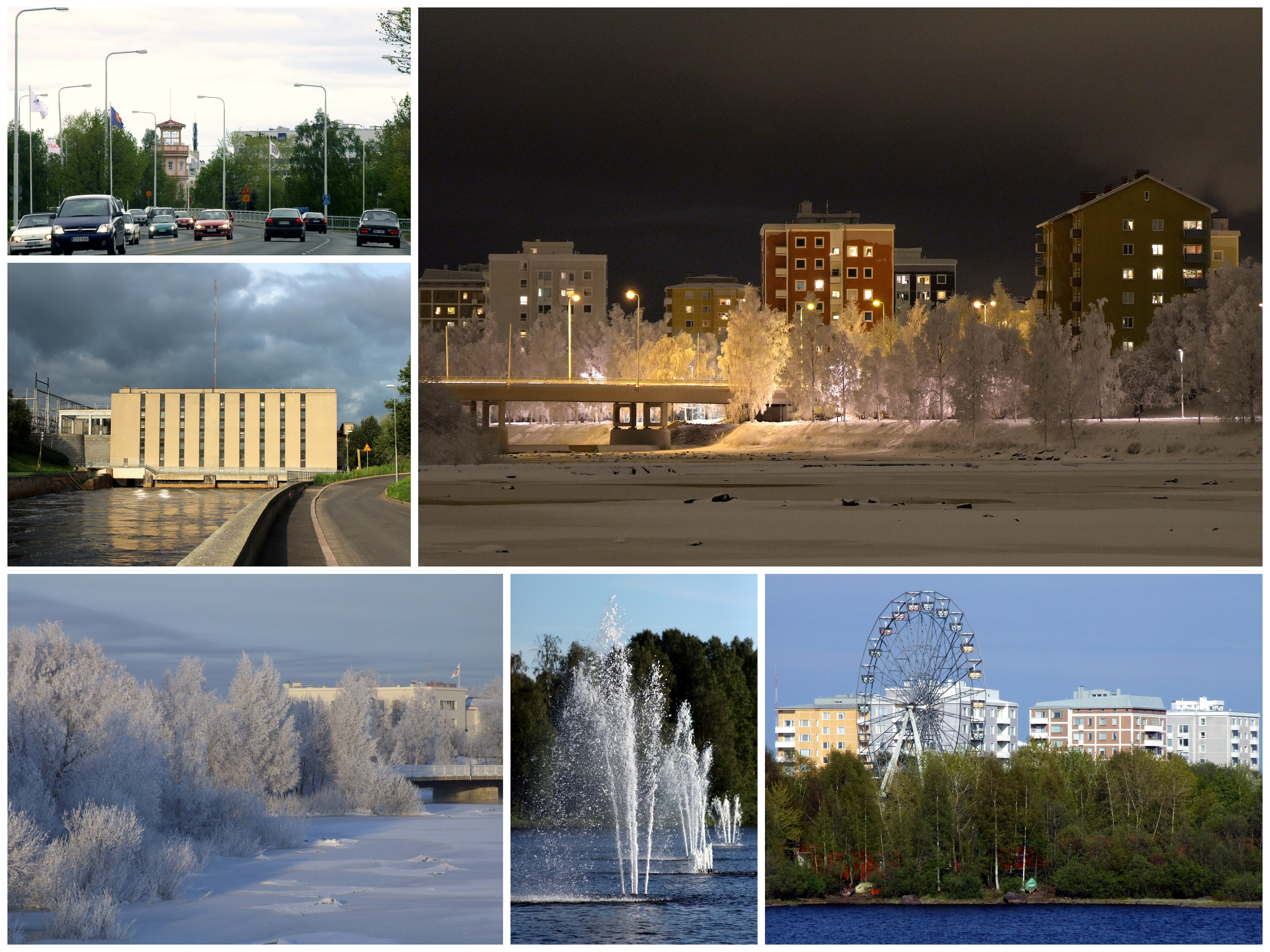
- Interactive map of Koskikeskus
- Country: Finland
- City: Oulu
- Areas of Oulu: Tuira area

Population (2013)
  - Total: 550
- Postal code: 90500

Koskikeskus (literally Rapids Center in Finnish) is a neighbourhood in the Tuira area in the city of Oulu, Finland. The neighbourhood is located in the estuary of the river Oulujoki. The Tuira Bridges in Koskikeskus connect the city centre and Tuira neighbourhoods. The first bridges through the delta were built in late 1860s.

Koskikeskus is built on the site of the former Merikoski rapids, which were lost when the Merikoski hydroelectric power station was built in the 1940s. The neighbourhood is made up of several islands of which only the artificial island of Toivoniemi is permanently inhabited. Other notable islands in the neighbourhood are Linnansaari, Raatinsaari and Kuusisaari.

The ruins of the Oulu Castle are located on the Linnansaari island. The former Oulu Marine School's observatory has been built on the ruins in 1875. Nowadays the observatory is used as a café. Most of the Raatinsaari island is taken by the Raatti Sports Centre, which includes the Raatti Stadium, a practice field and the Raatti indoor swimming pool. The Qstock rock festival has been held in the Kuusisaari island from 2003. In recent years the festival area has expanded to include a part of the Raatinsaari island too.
