= Merikoski Power Plant =

Merikoski Power Station
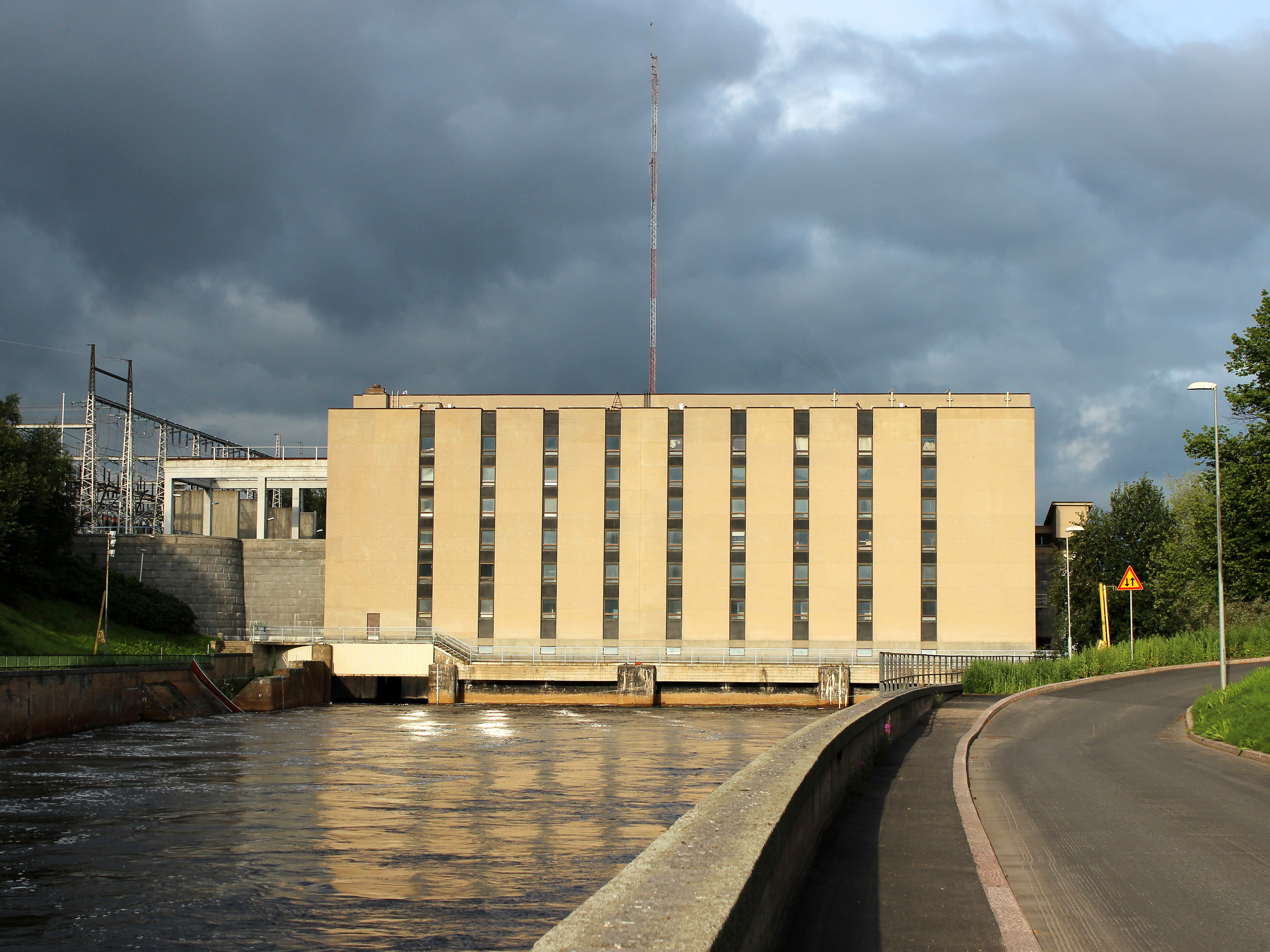

- Location within Finland
- Official name: Merikosken voimalaitos
- Country: Finland
- Location: Oulu
- Coordinates: 65°01′22″N 25°28′24″E
- Purpose: Power
- Status: Operational
- Construction began: 1940
- Opening date: 1948
- Owner: Oulun Energia

Dam and spillways
- Impounds: Oulujoki
- Height: 11 m
- Spillways: 3
- Spillway type: gates

Power Station
- Installed capacity: 39 MW
- Annual generation: 289 GWh (2012)

Merikoski Power Plant is a hydroelectric power station and a dam in the Koskikeskus district in Oulu, Finland. The plant is owned by the Oulun Energia municipal enterprise of the city of Oulu.

Construction of the power plant was started in 1940, but electricity generation for national grid was not started until 1948. The construction was delayed due to Second World War, although soviet prisoners of war were used as labour during the war. The power station building has been designed by architect Bertel Strömmer and the master plan of the area by architect Alvar Aalto.

== See also ==
- Energy in Finland
