= Hotel Tammer =

Hotel in Tampere, Finland

Radisson Blu Grand Hotel Tammer
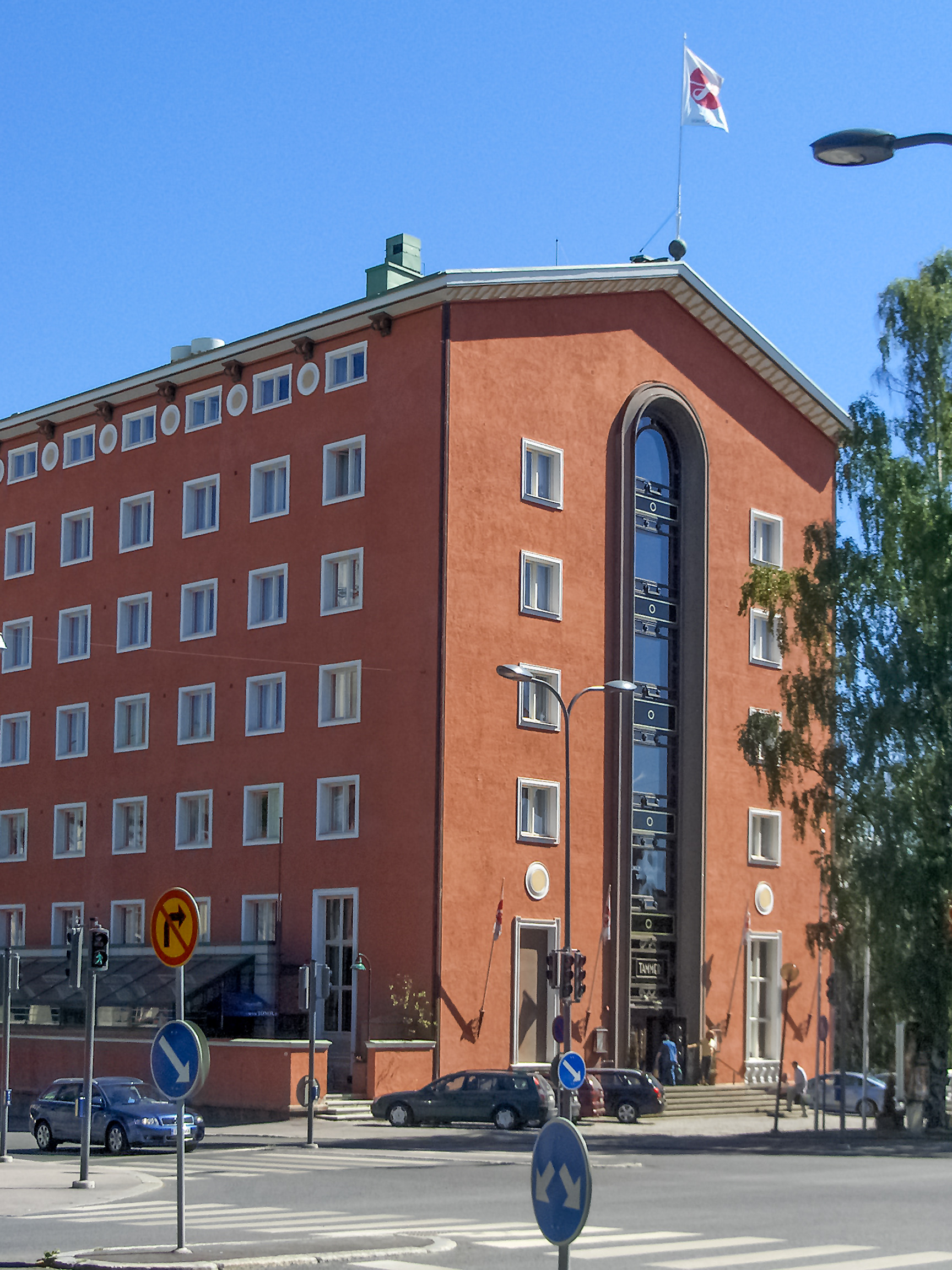
- Hotel Tammer

- Location within Finland
- Hotel chain: Radisson Blu

General information
- Location: Tampere, Finland, Satakunnankatu 13, FI-33100 Tampere
- Coordinates: 61°30′03″N 023°45′54″E
- Opening: 1929; 97 years ago

Design and construction
- Architect: Bertel Strömmer

Other information
- Number of rooms: 87
- Number of suites: 3
- Number of restaurants: 3

Website
- radissonhotels.com

Radisson Blu Grand Hotel Tammer is a historic hotel built in 1929, situated near Tammerkoski rapids in central Tampere, Finland.

== History ==
The Hotel Tammer is one of Finland's oldest operating hotels. The building is listed as a part of Tammerkoski national heritage area by the Finnish National Board of Antiquities. Built in neo-classical style and designed by town architect Bertel Strömmer, it was ready to open just in time for the 150th birthday of Tampere in fall 1929. A tragic event, sinking of steamer SS Kuru in lake Näsijärvi, cancelled all festivities. The depression years in the beginning of 1930s drove Hotel Tammer into financial trouble. At the end of the 1930s a better economic situation saved the hotel.

From 1995 to 2016, Hotel Tammer was part of the Finnish hotel chain Sokos Hotels under the name Solo Sokos Hotel Tammer.

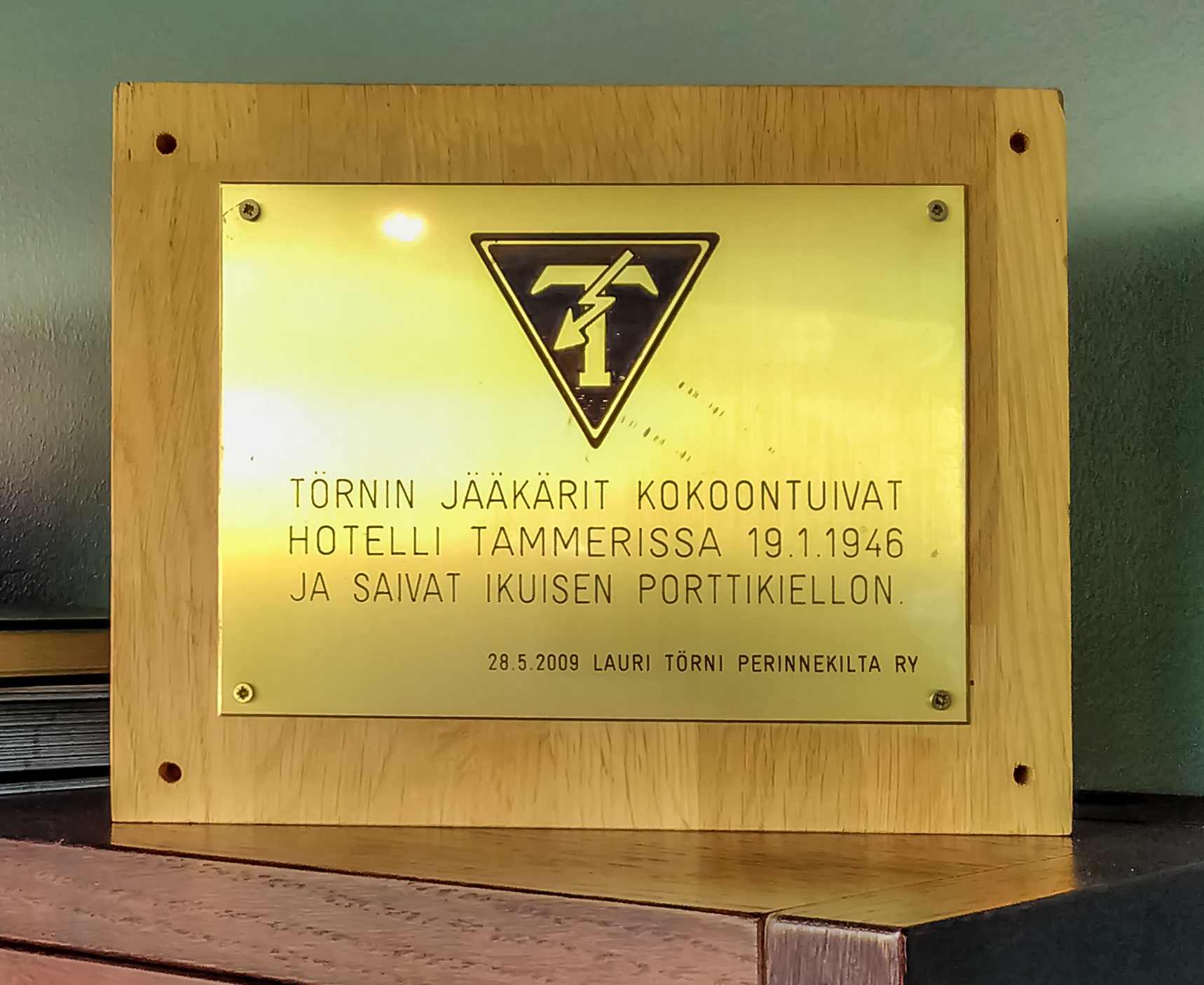
A plaque in Hotel Tammer about Lauri Törni's jägers being banned from meeting there in 1946

During its history Hotel Tammer has hosted many famous guests including the Finnish marshal Gustaf Mannerheim and the Soviet astronaut Yuri Gagarin. Also Nobel laureate in literature Frans Emil Sillanpää was a frequent guest.

The hotel has also been portrayed in books and films. Some of the events in Arto Paasilinna's novel Elämä lyhyt, Rytkönen pitkä were set in the hotel. Also scenes for a film adaptation of the novel were filmed in Hotel Tammer.

== Restaurant ==
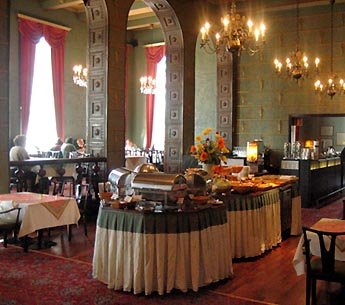
Breakfast in the hotel restaurant

Chaine des Rotisseurs restaurant Tammer is located in ground floor of the building. In summertime food is served in terrace restaurant called "Tammerin puisto".
