= Tuira Church =

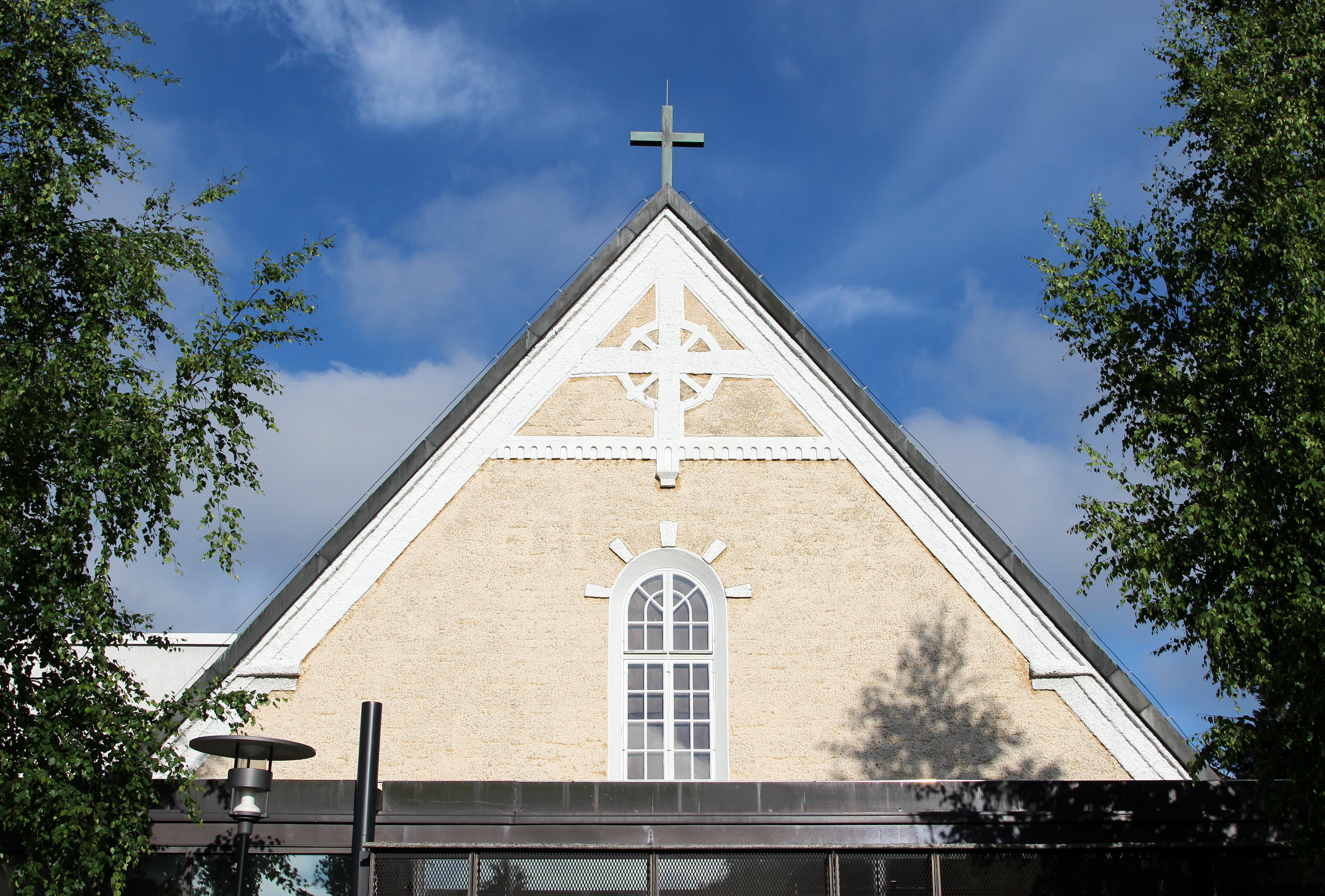
- Tuira Church
- 65°01′28″N 025°28′38″E
- Location: Tuira, Oulu
- Country: Finland
- Denomination: Lutheran
- Website: http://www.oulunseurakunnat.fi/tuirankirkko

History
- Status: Church

Architecture
- Functional status: Active
- Architect: Harald Andersin
- Completed: 1916

Specifications
- Capacity: 240

Administration
- Diocese: Diocese of Oulu
- Parish: Tuira parish

The Tuira Church (Finnish: Tuiran kirkko) is an evangelical Lutheran church in Tuira, Oulu. The church building has been designed by architect Harald Andersin and it was inaugurated as a chapel of Oulu parish in 1916. The parish of Oulu was divided into smaller parishes in 1966 and the chapel in Tuira was inaugurated as a church. At the time the first extension of the church was started according to plans of architect Mikko Huhtela. The current form is from 1992 when the second extension of the building was completed.
