= Raatti Stadium =

Stadium in Oulu, Finland

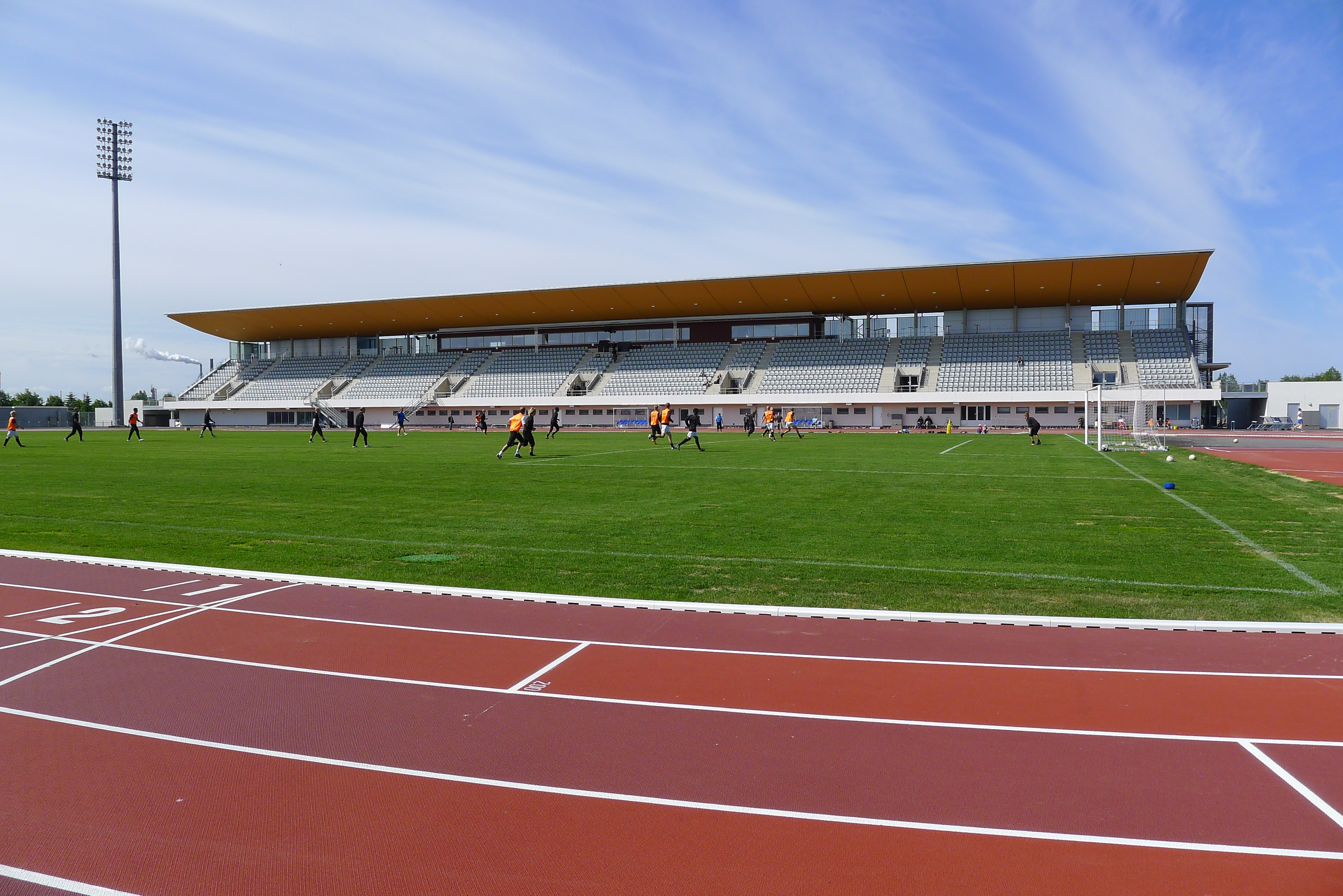
- Interactive map of Raatti Stadium
- Location: Koskikeskus, Oulu, Finland
- Coordinates: 65°01′11″N 025°27′57″E
- Owner: City of Oulu
- Capacity: 4,392

Construction
- Opened: 1953
- Renovated: 2009–2011

Raatti Stadium (Finnish: Raatin stadion) is a multi-purpose stadium in the Koskikeskus neighbourhood of Oulu, Finland. In 2011–2026 it was the home stadium of AC Oulu, competing in Finnish top-tier Veikkausliiga, and it is currently used mostly for football matches. The stadium holds 4,392 people. It was opened in 1953 and renovated in 2009–2011.
