= Bertel Strömmer =

Finnish architect

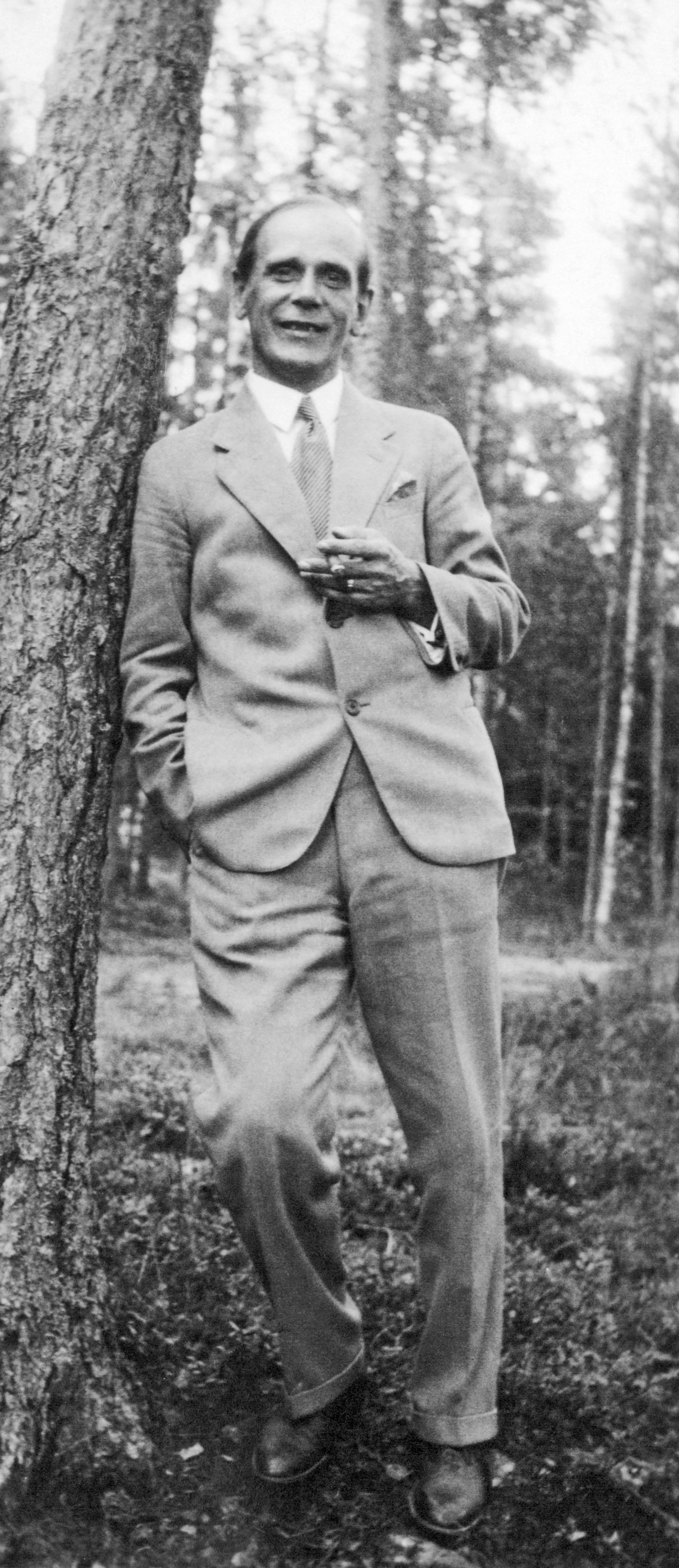
- Bertel Strömmer
- Born: 11 July 1890; Ikaalinen, Finland
- Died: 18 April 1962 (aged 71); Tampere, Finland
- Occupation: Architect
- Buildings: Hotel Tammer

Bertel Strömmer (11 July 1890, Ikaalinen – 18 April 1962, Tampere) was a Finnish architect. Strömmer worked as Tampere City Architect years 1918–53 and most of his work is located in Tampere. Strömmer designed both private and public buildings. Strömmer's most famous works include the Grand Hotel Tammer, the Tampere bus station and the town hall in Kemi.

Bertel Strömmer was the son of a pharmacist Sven Evert Strömmer and his wife Elin Ida Fredrika Fabritius. He graduated in 1908 and graduated as an architect in 1913. In 1914 married Ros-Mari Nordenswan with whom he had eight children.

== Works ==
- Grand Hotel Tammer, Tammerfors 1928
- Pori Water Tower, 1935
- Tampere bus station, 1938
- Tempohuset, Tammerfors, 1938
- City Hall in Kemi, 1940
- Merikoski Power Plant in Oulu, 1941–47
- Huberska house, Tampere, 1947–48
