= Aaron Bank =

United States Army officer (1902–2004)

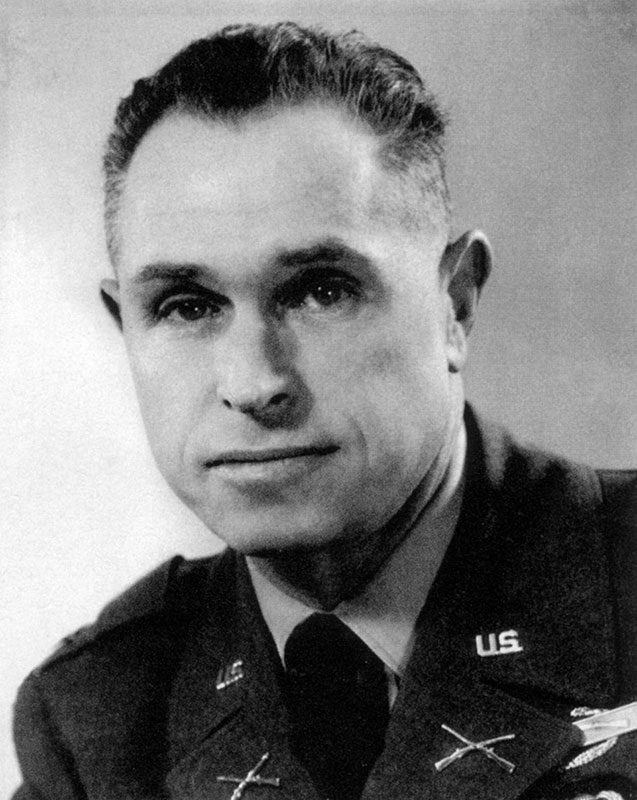
- COL Aaron Bank in uniform
- Born: November 23, 1902; New York City, New York, U.S.
- Died: April 1, 2004 (aged 101); Dana Point, California, U.S.
- Burial place: Riverside National Cemetery, Riverside, California, U.S.
- Spouse: Catherine Suzanne Wagner (m. 1948)
- Children: 2
- Military career
- Allegiance: United States
- Branch: United States Army
- Service years: 1942–1958
- Rank: Colonel
- Commands: 10th Special Forces Group
- Conflicts: World War II
- Awards: Army Distinguished Service Medal; Soldier's Medal; Bronze Star Medal

Aaron Bank (November 23, 1902 – April 1, 2004) was a United States Army colonel who founded the United States Army Special Forces, commonly known as the "Green Berets". He is also known for his exploits as an OSS officer during World War II, when he parachuted into France to coordinate the French Resistance and organizing an operation intended to capture Adolf Hitler. In retirement, Bank warned about terrorism and modern technology. He is largely responsible for the high level of security at U.S. nuclear power plants since the early 1970s.

== Early life ==
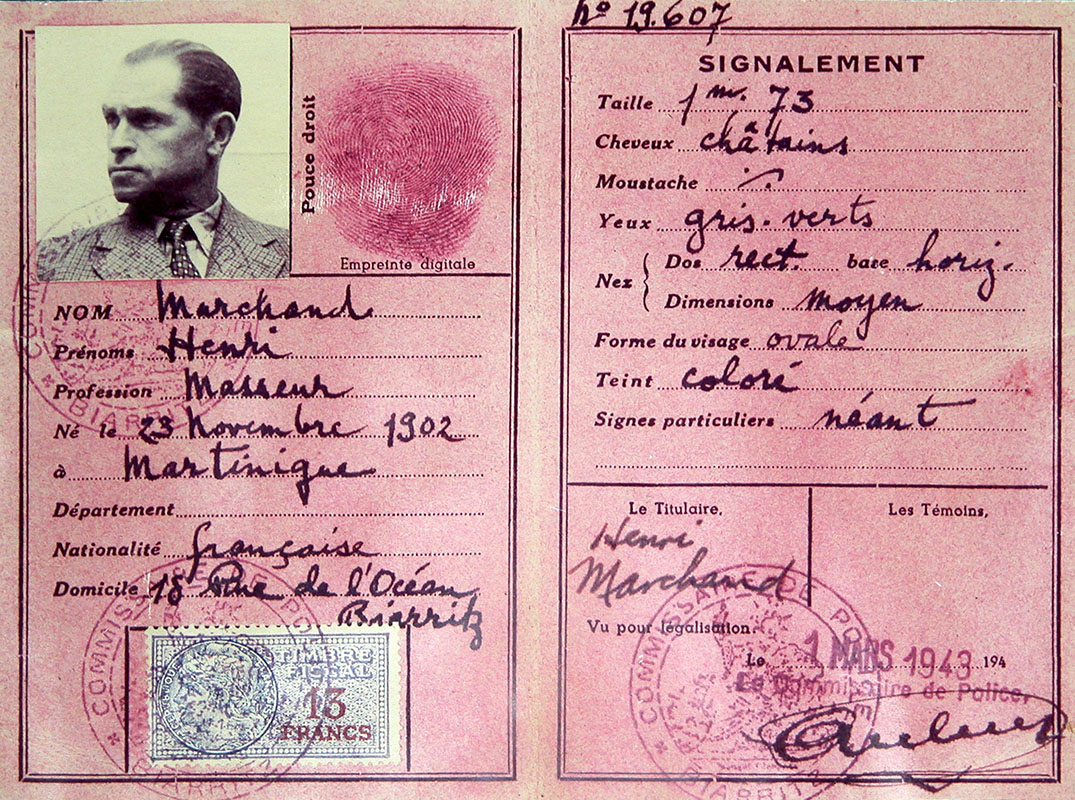
A false French identity card using his cover name "Henri Marchand"

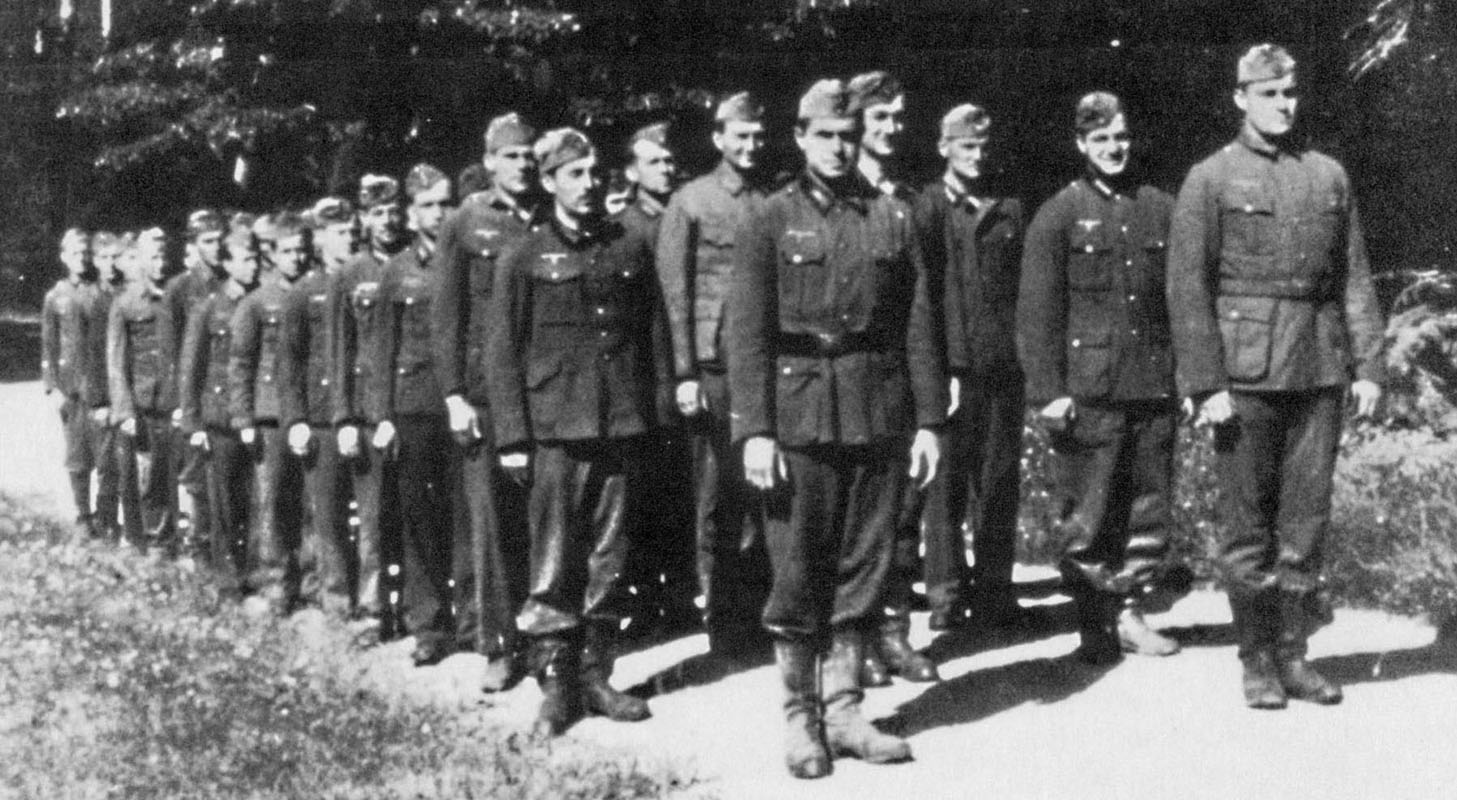
Aaron Bank standing alongside German defectors recruited for Operation Iron Cross. Bank is at left in the first rank

Bank grew up in New York City, the son of Russian Jewish immigrants. His father died in 1904 and his widowed mother raised him while earning a living by teaching French, German, and piano. As a young man, Bank worked as a life guard on Long Island, NY and in the Bahamas and later on he was chief life guard at an upscale resort in Biarritz.

== Military career ==
=== World War II ===
Bank enlisted in the United States Army on August 19, 1942, then volunteered for special operations work. He was in his late thirties, and thought "too old" for combat, but he was an unusually athletic man and so was accepted into the Office of Strategic Services (OSS).

The OSS conducted espionage operations (SI Branch) and special operations (SO Branch) for sabotage and guerrilla warfare. Bank was assigned to SO and the Operational Group Command, and on July 31, 1944, led the Jedburgh Team PACKARD, parachuting into Lozère Department of France and linking up with French Resistance.

At the time of "Operation Anvil", also known as "Operation Dragoon" (the Allied invasion of Southern France about six weeks after the D-Day invasion at Normandy), Bank and his French partisans drove the German forces away from the beachhead ahead of the Allied troops, liberating a number of French towns before the regular forces arrived.

In late 1944 and early 1945, Bank led "Operation Iron Cross," which evolved into a plan to capture or kill Adolf Hitler. The OSS recruited German POWs who were opposed to Hitler, finding many volunteers among former German soldiers, primarily former German Communists, and German Jews who had taken refuge in the Wehrmacht, posing as Gentiles. They formed a special forces unit trained as parachute infantry. Outfitted with SS uniforms and trained for "raid and snatch" missions, they were intended for insertion into the expected "Alpine Redoubt" on the Austrian/German border, where senior Nazi officials were planning to make their last stand against the advancing Allied armies.

Hitler was expected to flee from Berlin and retire to the Alpine Redoubt before the Soviets could enter the capital city, so General William Joseph Donovan, head of the OSS, issued this order: "Tell Bank to get Hitler."

"Iron Cross" was canceled almost on the eve of execution because intelligence showed that Hitler had remained in Berlin. (He committed suicide in his Berlin bunker on April 30, 1945.) Additionally, the 101st Airborne and 7th Army divisions were advancing so rapidly they were expected to capture the non-existent Alpine Redoubt before "Iron Cross" could be executed. (Bank's enemy-uniformed volunteers would also be prime targets for allied forces.)

With the capitulation of Germany in May 1945, Bank was reassigned to the Pacific theater, where he was inserted into Indochina and linked up with Ho Chi Minh, then leading the resistance to the Japanese. Bank spent considerable time traveling through Vietnam with Ho and was impressed with Ho's manifest popularity among the Vietnamese population. Bank advised the OSS of Ho's great popularity, recommended that Ho be allowed to form a coalition government, and predicted that Ho would win a popular election overwhelmingly if one was conducted.

It is not known whether Bank's recommendations reached President Harry S. Truman, but American policy was contrary: Ho was a long-time Communist, having joined the party in the 1920s in Paris, and therefore was considered unacceptable as leader of a coalition government. Some French "Vichy" military forces remained in Indochina, and the United States now consented to the use of these residual forces to block Ho and reinstate Indochina as a French colony. President Truman and later President Dwight D. Eisenhower provided financial support to the French, thus leading to the Indochina War and ultimately the Vietnam War.

Bank was accused by French officials of proliferating anti-French propaganda amongst Lao Issara and Viet Minh nationalist groups. These events reached a climax on September 27, 1945, when a British party, led by Peter Kemp crossed the Mekong from their base in northeast Thailand and were surrounded by an armed Viet Minh patrol, who demanded the surrender of a French lieutenant. The Viet Minh assassinated the French lieutenant, even though he was under the protection of the British. An American OSS officer, Lt. Reese, was with Kemp and the French officer and stood aside, stating that he was "neutral". Kemp believed that had Reese shown some mettle the French officer would not have been killed. Bank and the OSS mission were recalled by authorities in Kunming.

=== Post-war activities and the founding of the Special Forces ===
After the war Bank remained in the Army and became a leading advocate for the formation of a professional special forces (unconventional warfare) division, equivalent to the SO branch of OSS. Along with Colonel Russell W. Volckmann, who had been a guerrilla in the Philippines, they argued for deploying this force behind the "Iron Curtain," in the Eastern European nations dominated by the Soviet Union, where there was a real possibility of a local resistance movement arising.

In 1952, Bank became the first commander of the Army's first Special Forces unit, called the 10th Special Forces Group, a number which was selected to confound the Russians with suspicions of nine more such units. In establishing the 10th, he was as flexible as he had been with "Iron Cross", drawing upon former members of the "1st Special Service Force" known as the Devil's Brigade, as well as veterans of the OSS, the Parachute Infantry units, and guerrilla elements in the Pacific.

Using the training and strategies and the lessons learned during World War II, Bank created an elite unit of men skilled in foreign languages (to interface with foreign insurgents), the arts of sabotage and stealth tactics, the use of explosives for demolition, amphibious warfare, rock climbing, jungle warfare, mountain fighting and as ski troops.

Special Forces today are still all volunteer and organized into "A teams," as Bank organized his men in the 10th Special Forces group in 1952, with two experts in every specialty. They still undergo an arduous training process in which large numbers of men fail or quit, as Bank required of the men of "Operation Iron Cross".

Bank was commended by President George W. Bush in 2002, the year he celebrated his hundredth birthday, for developing the unconventional warfare programs and techniques that were used in toppling the Taliban.

== Later life ==
Bank retired from the army in 1958, and remained a vigorous man well into his eighties, swimming several miles a day in the Pacific Ocean near his home in San Clemente, California.

In the early 1970s, Bank began a personal investigation of the lack of security at the San Onofre Nuclear Generating Station, which is a few miles south of San Clemente. Bank determined that the San Onofre plant was protected by one private security guard with a sidearm, as if the only concern was civilian theft. Bank concluded that a single special forces soldier could overcome this guard, seize the plant and destroy it with a small quantity of explosives. The consequence could be a Chernobyl-type accident, whereby the damaged plant would emit radioactivity into the atmosphere and contaminate thousands of square miles, including the nearby Los Angeles Basin.

Bank became alarmed at the recklessness of the civilian operators of San Onofre, and actively lobbied, then testified before a closed session of the U.S. Atomic Energy Commission, warning of the dangers of terrorist sabotage at San Onofre. As one of the world's leading experts on the sabotage of electric generating facilities, Bank spoke with great authority, but the AEC ultimately ignored these efforts and did not change the policy of the plant.

Bank then shared his concerns with an investigative journalist, who wrote an exposé of poor security at San Onofre for the Bulletin of the Atomic Scientists in 1974. This led to a Congressional investigation and further secret testimony by Bank before a Congressional committee. This time, Bank's testimony was heeded, and Congressional pressure forced the AEC and its successor, the Nuclear Regulatory Commission, to act. The U.S. nuclear power industry was ordered to spend billions of dollars implementing anti-terrorist security measures at commercial nuclear reactors nationwide, including on-site security squads with automatic weapons, remote scram capabilities (to take control of the plant from a distance and shut it down in the event of an attack) and the use of "red teams" to probe defenses and thereby eliminate vulnerabilities.

He served in the late 1970s as the chief of Security for the Capistrano Bay Community Services District on Beach Road, a private community of homes along Capistrano Beach, next to Dana Point, California.

== Personal life ==
Bank married German-born Catherine Suzanne Wagner on August 4, 1948, in Munich, and they had two daughters, Linda and Alexandra. He wrote two books, first, From OSS to Green Berets: the Birth of Special Forces, which describes his exploits in France and Indochina and his role in founding the Special Forces and then Knight's Cross, a fictionalized account of a completed Operation Iron Cross which was co-written with E. M. Nathanson. He died on April 1, 2004, in Dana Point, California, at the age of 101. He is buried at Riverside National Cemetery in Riverside, California.

== Awards and decorations ==

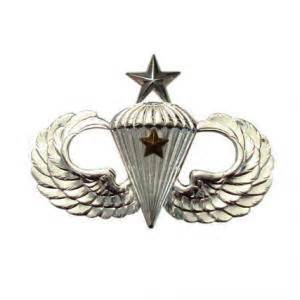

Combat Infantryman Badge
| Army Distinguished Service Medal | | Soldier's Medal | |
| Bronze Star | American Campaign Medal | Asiatic-Pacific Campaign Medal | European–African–Middle Eastern Campaign Medal with bronze award star |
| World War II Victory Medal | Army of Occupation Medal | National Defense Service Medal | China War Memorial Medal |
| Senior Parachutist Badge, 1 Combat Jump | | Special Forces tab | |
