= Lauri Törni =

Finnish military officer in the Finnish Army, Waffen-SS, and U.S. Army (1919–1965)

Lauri Törni (Larry Thorne) (Note: Gill (1998) gives several aliases used by Törni: "Lauri Laine" when receiving German training (p. 69); "Aulis Haapalainen" after escaping from a British POW camp (p. 83); and "Eino Mörsky" when traveling to Venezuela and the United States (pp. 93–94).)
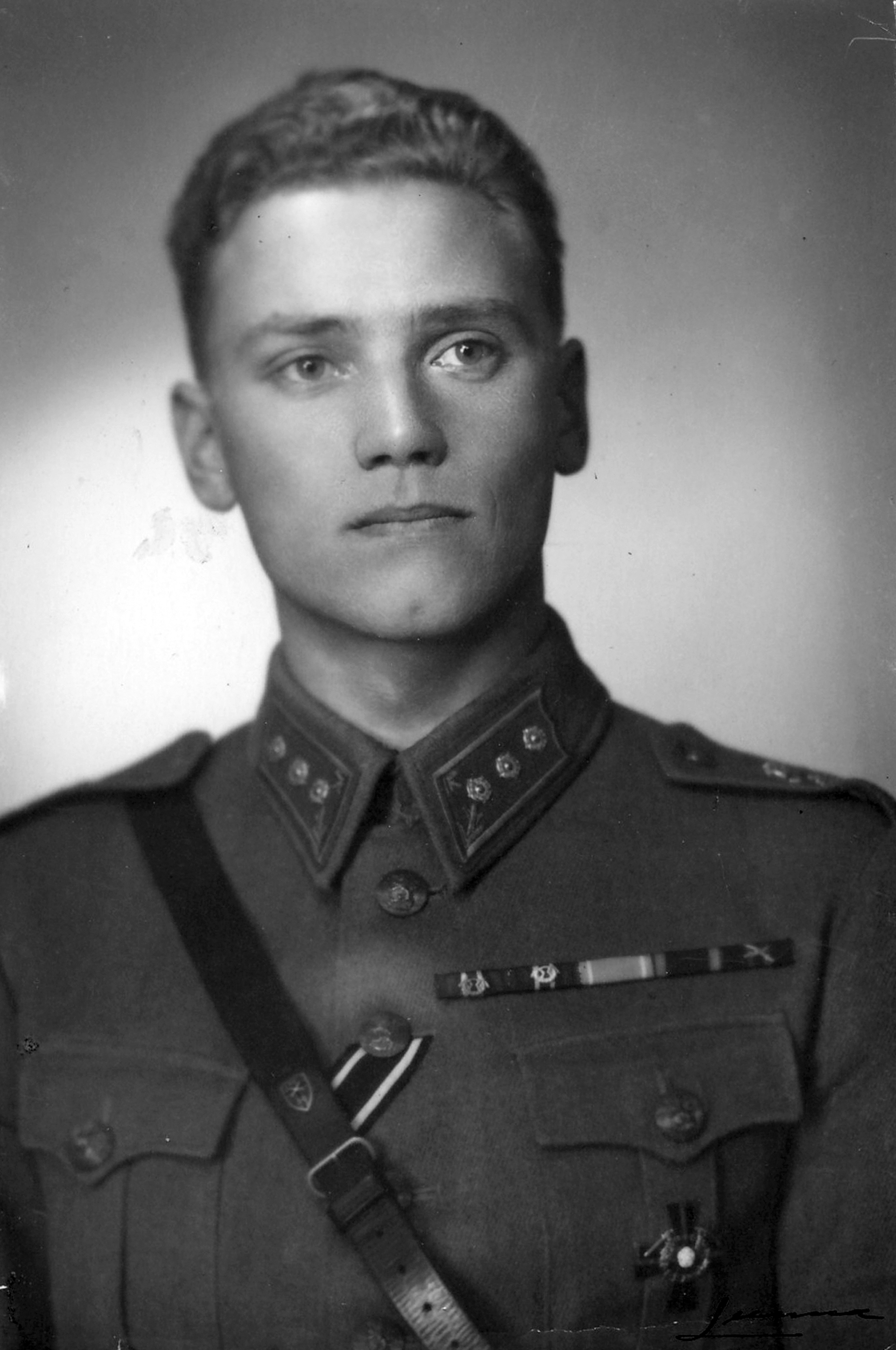
- Törni in Finnish uniform, 1944
- Born: Lauri Allan Törni; 28 May 1919; Viipuri, Finland
- Died: 18 October 1965 (aged 46); Phước Sơn District, Quảng Nam Province, South Vietnam
- Burial place: Arlington National Cemetery
- Other name: Larry Alan Thorne
- Military career
- Allegiance: Finland; Germany; United States
- Branch: Finnish Army; Waffen-SS; United States Army
- Service years: 1938–1944 (Finnish Army); 1941, 1945 (German Waffen-SS); 1954–1965 (U.S. Army)
- Rank: Captain (Finland); Hauptsturmführer (Germany); Major (US) (posthumous)
- Nickname: Lasse
- Units: Finland: 12th Light Infantry Regiment; 8th Light Detachment of the 1st Division; 56th Infantry Regiment ("Törni Detachment"); Germany: Sonderkommando Nord; United States: 7th Special Forces Group; 11th Airborne Division; 10th Special Forces Group; 5th Special Forces Group
- Commands: Detachment Törni (Finnish Army)
- Conflicts: World War II; Winter War; Eastern Front; Continuation War; Finnish invasion of East Karelia; Vyborg–Petrozavodsk offensive; Battle of Ilomantsi; Lapland War; Vietnam War; Operation Shining Brass †
- Awards: Mannerheim Cross 2nd Class; Iron Cross 2nd Class; Legion of Merit; Distinguished Flying Cross; Bronze Star; Purple Heart (2)
- Criminal information
- Body discovered: 1999; 27 years ago
- Movement: Anti-communism
- Status: Pardoned
- Conviction: Treason
- Penalty: 6 years imprisonment

Lauri Allan Törni (28 May 1919 – 18 October 1965), later known as Larry Alan Thorne, was a Finnish-born soldier who fought under three countries: as a Finnish Army officer in the Winter War and the Continuation War ultimately gaining a rank of captain; as a Waffen-SS captain (under the alias Lauri Laine) when he fought the Red Army on the Eastern Front in World War II; and as a United States Army Major (under the name Larry Thorne) when he served in the U.S. Army Special Forces in the Vietnam War.

Törni died in a helicopter crash on 18 October 1965, during a covert mission in Laos amidst the Vietnam War. Serving with the U.S. Army Special Forces, Törni was involved in operations conducted by MACV-SOG when the helicopter he was on crashed under unclear circumstances. The crash site was difficult to locate due to the rugged terrain and adverse weather conditions, delaying recovery efforts. Törni's remains, along with those of other soldiers aboard, were eventually found three decades later.

== Early life and education ==
Christened Lauri Allan Törni, he was born in Viipuri, Viipuri Province, Finland, to ship captain Jalmari (Ilmari) Törni, and his wife, Rosa Maria (née Kosonen). He had two sisters: Salme Kyllikki Rajala (b. 1920) and Kaija Iris Mikkola (b. 1922). An athletic youth, Törni was an early friend of future Olympic Boxing Gold Medalist Sten Suvio.

After attending business school and serving with the Civil Guard, Törni entered military service in 1938, joining Jaeger Battalion 4 stationed at Kiviniemi. When the Winter War began in November 1939, his enlistment was extended, and his unit confronted invading Soviet troops at Rautu.

== Career ==
=== World War II ===
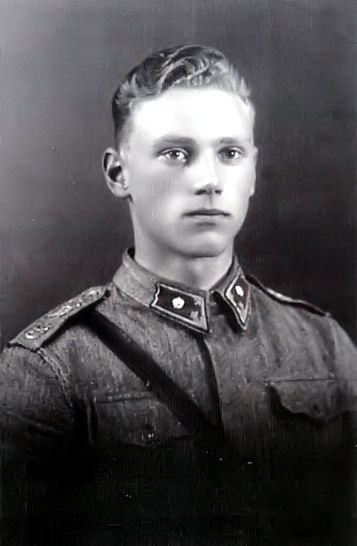
Vänrikki Lauri Törni after graduating from cadet school in 1940

During the battles at Lake Ladoga, Törni took part in the destruction of the encircled Soviet divisions in Lemetti.

His performance during these engagements was noticed by his commanders, and toward the end of the conflict, he was assigned to officer training where he was commissioned as a Vänrikki (2nd lieutenant) in the reserves. After the Winter War, in June 1941, Törni went to Vienna, Austria for seven weeks of training with the Waffen-SS, and returned to Finland in July. As a Finnish officer, the Germans recognized him as an Untersturmführer.

Most of Törni's reputation was based on his successful actions in the Continuation War (1941–44) between the Soviet Union and Finland. In 1943, a unit informally named Detachment Törni was created under his command. This was an infantry unit that penetrated deep behind enemy lines and soon enjoyed a reputation on both sides of the front for its combat effectiveness.

One of Törni's subordinates was future President of Finland Mauno Koivisto. Koivisto served in a reconnaissance company under Törni's command during the Battle of Ilomantsi, the final Finnish-Soviet engagement of the Continuation War, in July and August 1944. Törni's unit inflicted such heavy casualties on Soviet units that the Soviet Army placed a bounty of 3,000,000 Finnish marks on his head. He was decorated with the Mannerheim Cross 2nd Class on 9 July 1944.

The shoulder patch of Detachment Törni

The September 1944 Moscow Armistice required the Finnish government to remove German troops from Finnish territory, resulting in the Lapland War. During this period, much of the Finnish Army was demobilized, including Törni, leaving him unemployed in November 1944. In January 1945, he was recruited by the Pro-German resistance movement in Finland and left for saboteur training in Germany, with the intention of organizing resistance in case Finland was occupied by the Soviet Union. The training was prematurely ended in March. As Törni could not secure transportation to Finland, he joined the Waffen SS to fight Soviet troops near Schwerin, Germany. He surrendered to British troops in the last stages of World War II and returned to Finland in June 1945 after escaping a British POW camp in Lübeck, Germany.

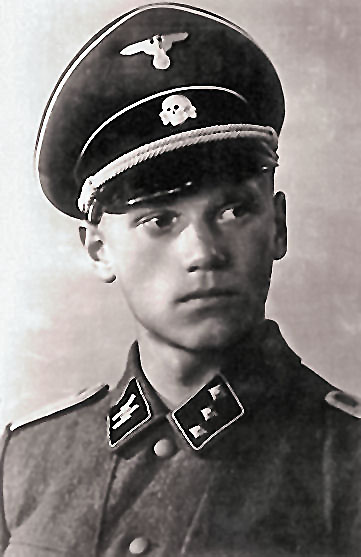
Törni in a Waffen-SS uniform during training in 1941

As his family had been evacuated from Karelia, Törni sought to rejoin them in Helsinki but was arrested by Valpo, the Finnish state police. After escaping, he was arrested a second time in April 1946, and tried for treason for continuing to serve in the German military during the Lapland War. A trial in October and November resulted in a six-year sentence in January 1947. Imprisoned at the Turku provincial prison, Törni escaped in June, but was recaptured and sent to the Riihimäki State Prison. President Juho Paasikivi granted him a pardon in December 1948.

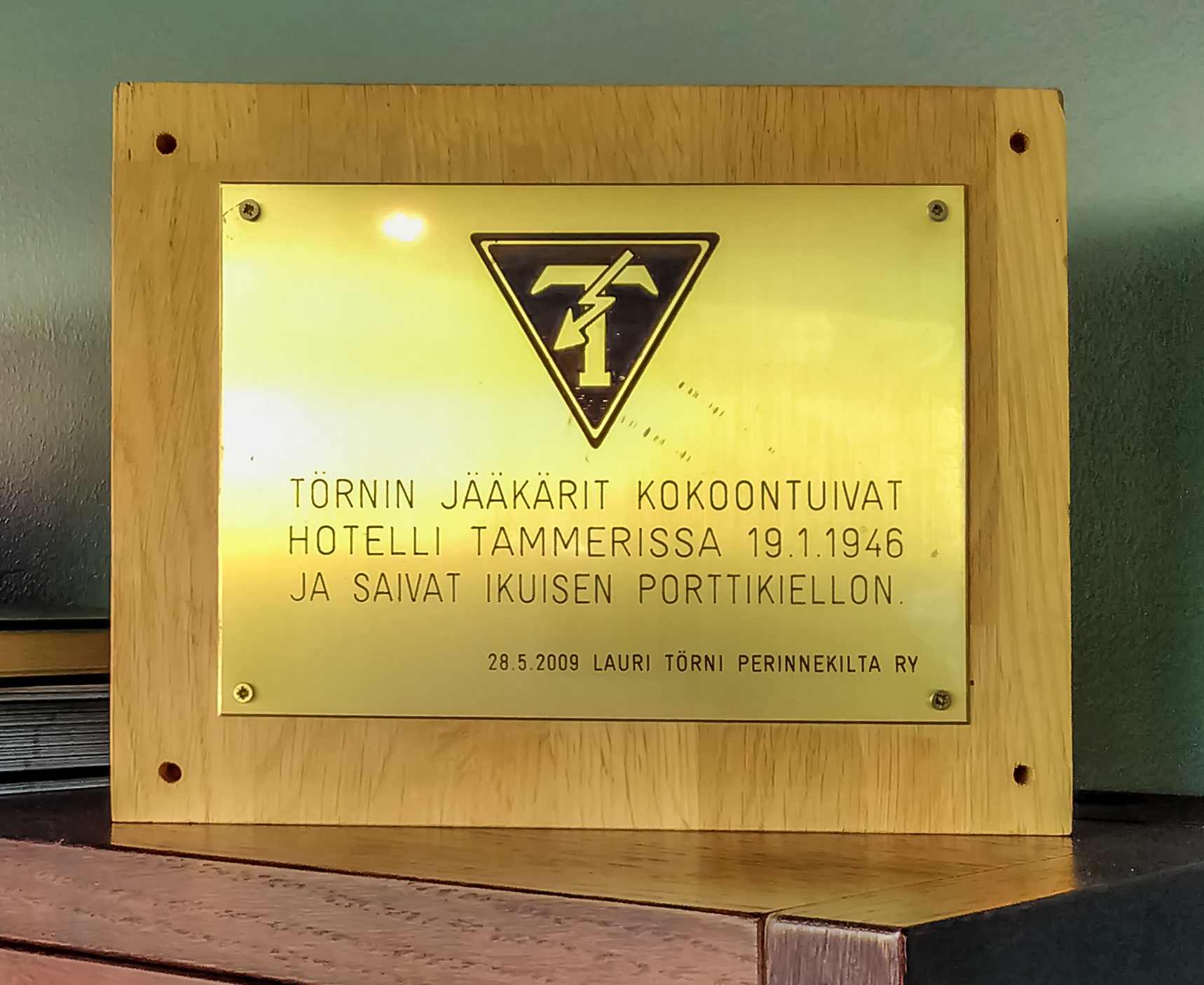
A plaque in Hotel Tammer, Tampere, about Lauri Törni's Jägers being banned from meeting there in 1946.

=== Emigration to the United States ===
In 1949, Törni, accompanied by his wartime executive officer Holger Pitkänen, traveled to Sweden, crossing the border from Tornio to Haparanda. From Haparanda, Törni travelled by railroad to Stockholm where he stayed with Baroness von Essen, who harbored many fugitive Finnish officers following the war. Pitkänen was arrested and repatriated to Finland. In Sweden, Törni fell in love with a Swedish Finn, Marja Kops, and was soon engaged to be married.

In order to secure employment, Törni travelled under an alias as a Swedish seaman aboard the SS Bolivia, destined for Caracas, Venezuela, where he met one of his Winter War commanders, the Finnish colonel Matti Aarnio, who was living in Venezuela. Törni hid on a Swedish cargo ship, the MS Skagen, which travelled from Caracas to the United States in 1950.

While in the Gulf of Mexico, near Mobile, Alabama, Törni jumped overboard and swam to shore. Now a political refugee, Törni traveled to New York City where he was helped by the Finnish-American community living in Brooklyn's Sunset Park "Finntown". There he worked as a carpenter and cleaner. In 1953, Törni was granted a residence permit through an Act of Congress that was shepherded by the law firm of "Wild Bill" Donovan, former head of the Office of Strategic Services.

==== United States Army ====
In 1954, Törni enlisted in the U.S. Army under the provisions of the Lodge-Philbin Act and adopted the name Larry Thorne. In the U.S. Army, he was befriended by a group of Finnish-American officers who came to be known as "Marttinen's Men" (fin. Marttisen miehet). (Note: Named after Colonel Alpo K. Marttinen, this group of Finnish wartime officers had immigrated to the United States and joined the U.S. Army under the Lodge Act. Several were brought into the US Special Forces at its inception.)

With their support, Thorne joined the U.S. Army Special Forces. While in the Special Forces, he taught skiing, survival, mountaineering, and guerrilla tactics. He attended airborne school, and advanced in rank to sergeant. Receiving his US citizenship in 1957, Thorne attended Officer Candidate School, and was commissioned as a first lieutenant in the Signal Corps.

He later received a Regular Army commission and a promotion to captain in 1960. From 1958 to 1962, he served in the 10th Special Forces Group in West Germany at Bad Tölz, from where he was second-in-command of a search and recovery mission high in the Zagros Mountains of Iran, which gained him a notable reputation. When he was in Germany, he briefly visited his relatives in Finland. In an episode of The Big Picture released in 1962 and composed of footage filmed in 1959, Thorne is shown as a lieutenant with the 10th Special Forces Group in the United States Army.

=== Vietnam War ===
Deploying to South Vietnam in November 1963 to support Army of the Republic of Vietnam (ARVN) forces in the Vietnam War, Thorne and Special Forces Detachment A-734 were stationed in the Tịnh Biên District and assigned to operate Civilian Irregular Defense Group (CIDG) encampments at Châu Lăng and later Tịnh Biên.

During a fierce attack on the CIDG camp in Tịnh Biên, he received two Purple Hearts and a Bronze Star Medal for valor during the battle.

Thorne's second tour in Vietnam began in February 1965 with 5th Special Forces Group; he then transferred to Military Assistance Command, Vietnam – Studies and Observations Group (MACV–SOG), a classified US special operations unit focusing on unconventional warfare in Vietnam, as a military advisor.

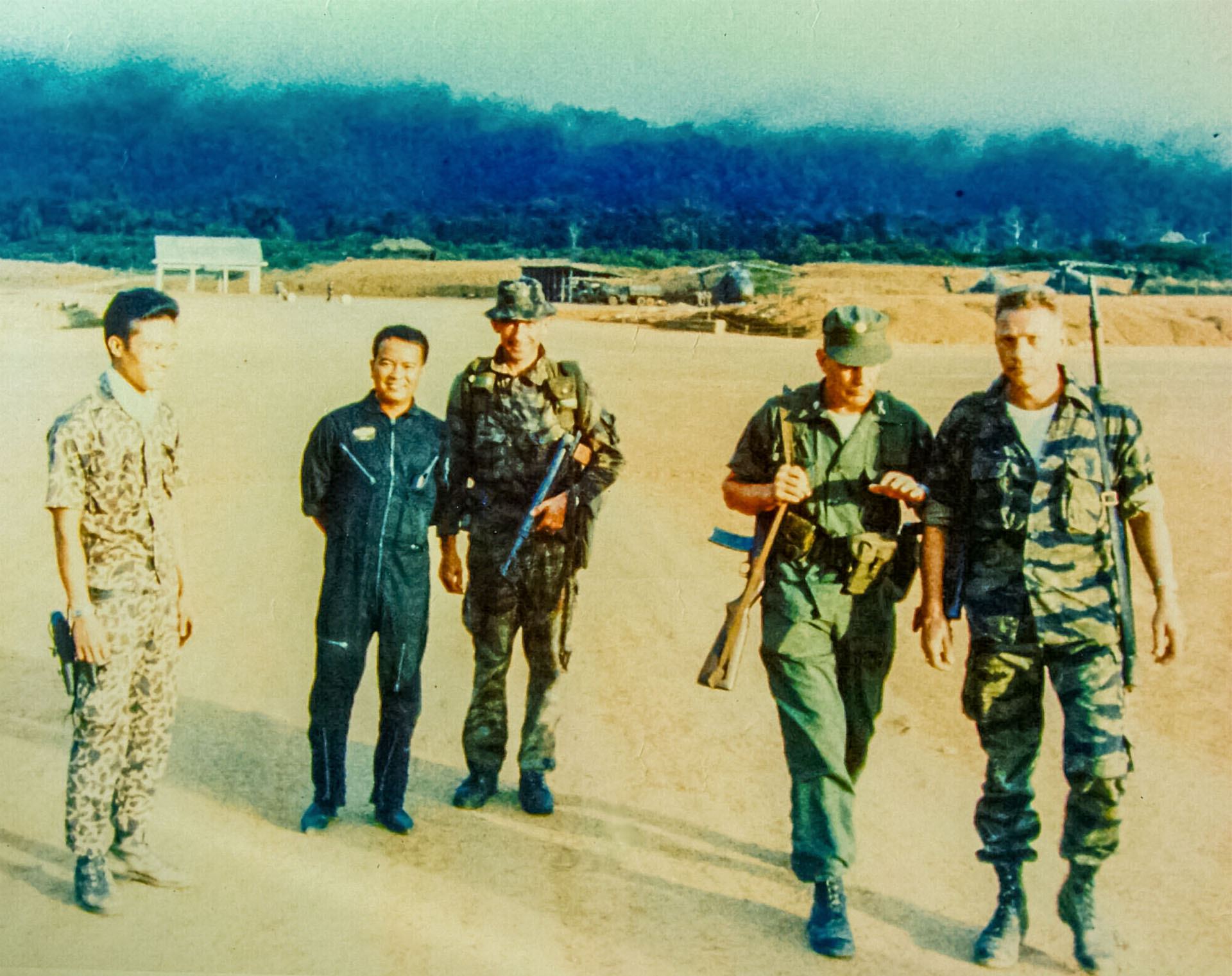
The last photo of Lauri Törni on 15 October 1965, three days before his death. A reconnaissance team is about to depart on a mission from Kham Duc. Pictured are Vietnamese helicopter pilots, Patrol Leader Charles Petry, Lieutenant Colonel Ray Call, and Captain Larry Thorne.

On 18 October 1965, as part of the operation Shining Brass, Thorne was supervising the first clandestine mission to locate Viet Cong turnaround points along the Ho Chi Minh trail and destroy them with airstrikes. Two Republic of Vietnam Air Force (RVNAF) CH-34 helicopters launched from Kham Duc Special Forces Camp and rendezvoused with a United States Air Force Cessna O-1 Bird Dog Forward Air Controller in inclement weather in a mountainous area of Phước Sơn District, Quảng Nam Province, Vietnam, 25 miles (40 km) from Da Nang.

While one CH-34 descended through a gap in the weather to drop off the six-man team, the command CH-34 carrying Thorne and the O-1 loitered nearby. When the drop helicopter returned above the cloud cover, both the CH-34 and the O-1 had disappeared. Rescue teams were unable to locate the crash site. Shortly after his disappearance, Thorne was promoted to the rank of major and posthumously awarded the Legion of Merit and Distinguished Flying Cross.

In 1999, Thorne's remains were found by a Finnish and Joint Task Force-Full Accounting team. (Note: Per McDowell, Finnish members of the team included publisher Kari Kallonen, reporter Petri Sarjanen, photographer Juha Saxberg, Törni's nephew Juha Rajala, and videographer Tapio Anttila.) They were repatriated to the United States following a Hanoi Noi Bai International Airport ceremony that included Secretary of State Madeleine Albright and Ambassador Pete Peterson.

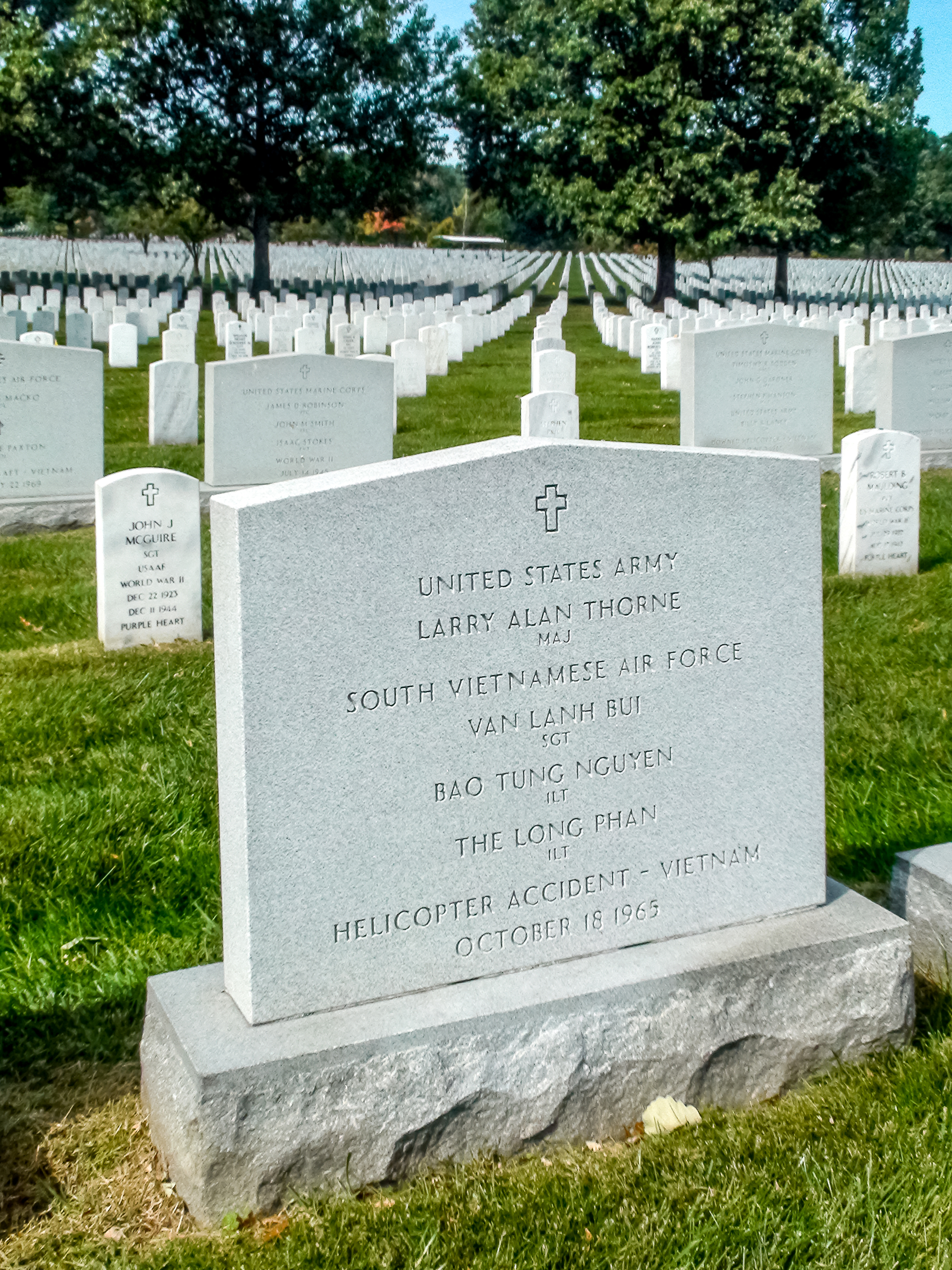
The shared grave of Thorne and fellow Vietnam War casualties in Arlington National Cemetery

Formally identified in 2003, his remains were buried on 26 June 2003 at Arlington National Cemetery, along with the RVNAF casualties of the mission recovered at the crash site. He was memorialized on the Vietnam Veterans Memorial at Panel 02E, Line 126. He was survived only by his fiancée, Marja Kops.

== Military awards ==
Finnish Army

Decorations and medals

- 2nd class Medal of Liberty, 26 July 1940
- 1st class Medal of Liberty, 24 August 1940
- 3rd class Cross of Liberty, 9 October 1941
- 4th class Cross of Liberty, 23 May 1942
- 2nd class Mannerheim Cross, 9 July 1944
- 1st Div. Memorial Cross
- Border Jaeger Troops Cross
- Defence Forces Bronze Medal

German Waffen-SS

Badges

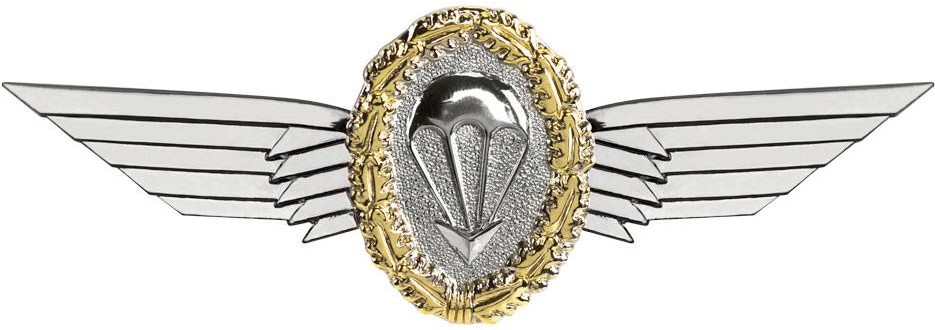
- Silver German Parachutist Badge

Decorations and medals

- Iron Cross, 2nd class, 11 December 1943

United States Army

Badges

- Combat Infantryman Badge
- Master Parachutist Badge
- Special Forces Tab
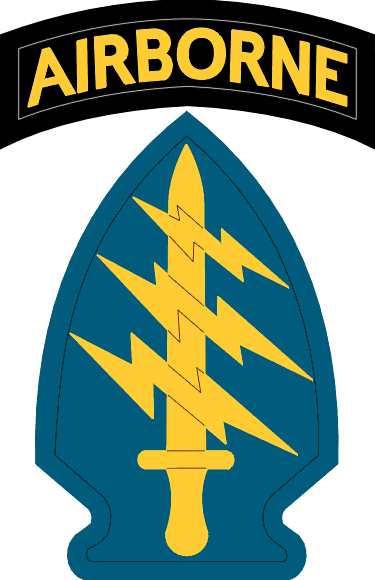
- Army Special Forces CSIB

Decorations and medals

- Legion of Merit (posthumous)
- Distinguished Flying Cross (posthumous)
- Bronze Star Medal with "V" device
- Purple Heart with oak leaf cluster
- Air Medal
- Army Commendation Medal
- Good Conduct Medal
- National Defense Service Medal with star
- Vietnam Service Medal with two campaign stars
- Vietnam Campaign Medal

=== Distinguished Flying Cross citation ===
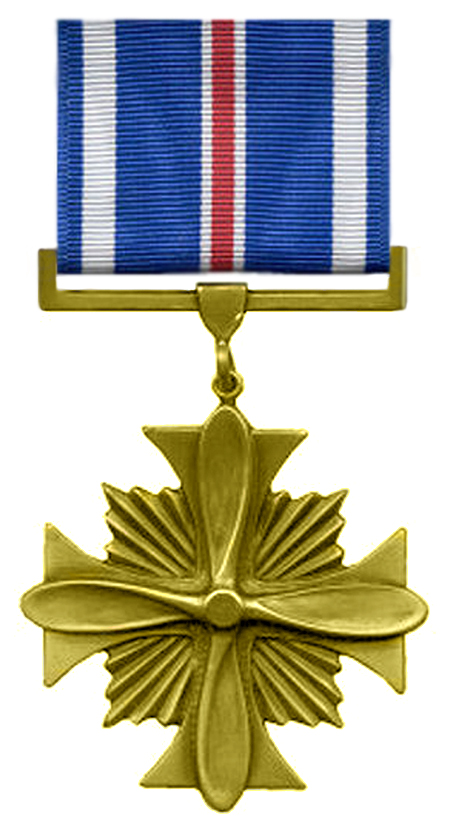

Citation:

The President of the United States of America, authorized by Act of Congress, July 2, 1926, takes pride in presenting the Distinguished Flying Cross (Posthumously) to Major (Infantry), (then Captain) Larry Alan Thorne (ASN: 0-2287104), United States Army, for heroism while participating in aerial flight on 18 October 1965 in the Republic of Vietnam. Major Thorne was operations officer responsible for launching a small, combined reconnaissance patrol on an extremely hazardous mission into a suspected Viet Cong stronghold. Due to the extreme hazards attending this mission, including weather and enemy action, Major Thorne volunteered to accompany submission aircraft during the introduction of the patrol in place of the assigned individual. After delivering the patrol to the landing zone, Major Thorne remained with one aircraft in the immediate area to receive an initial report from the patrol on the ground. This report was mandatory since only the vaguest information was available about enemy disposition near the landing zone. If the patrol were immediately confronted by a superior force, Major Thorne would land and extricate the patrol under fire. This was done with total disregard for the inherent dangers and with selfless concern for the ground forces. In so doing, he exposed himself to extreme personal danger which ultimately led to his disappearance and the loss of his aircraft. He had, however, guaranteed the safe introduction of the patrol into the area, the successful accomplishment of this mission and had positioned himself to react to any immediate calls for assistance from the patrol. Due to Major Thorne's efforts, the mission was accomplished successfully and contributed significantly to the overall mission of interdicting Viet Cong activities within the area. Major Thorne's actions were in keeping with the highest traditions of the military service, and reflect great credit upon himself and the United States Army.

General Orders: Department of the Army, General Orders No. 33 (July 26, 1967)

Action Date: October 18, 1965

== Dates of rank ==
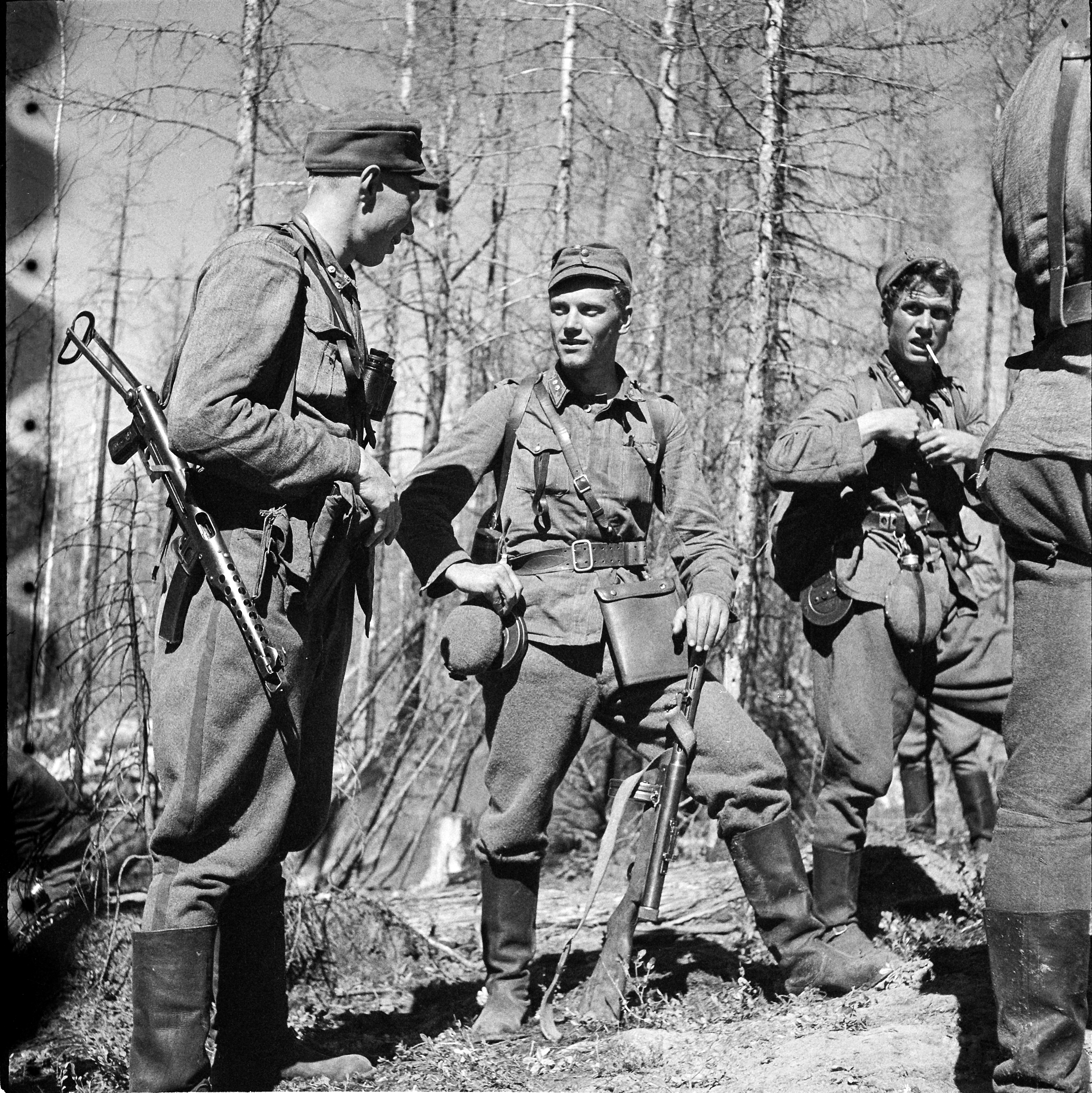
Törni (in the middle) as a Finnish Army lieutenant

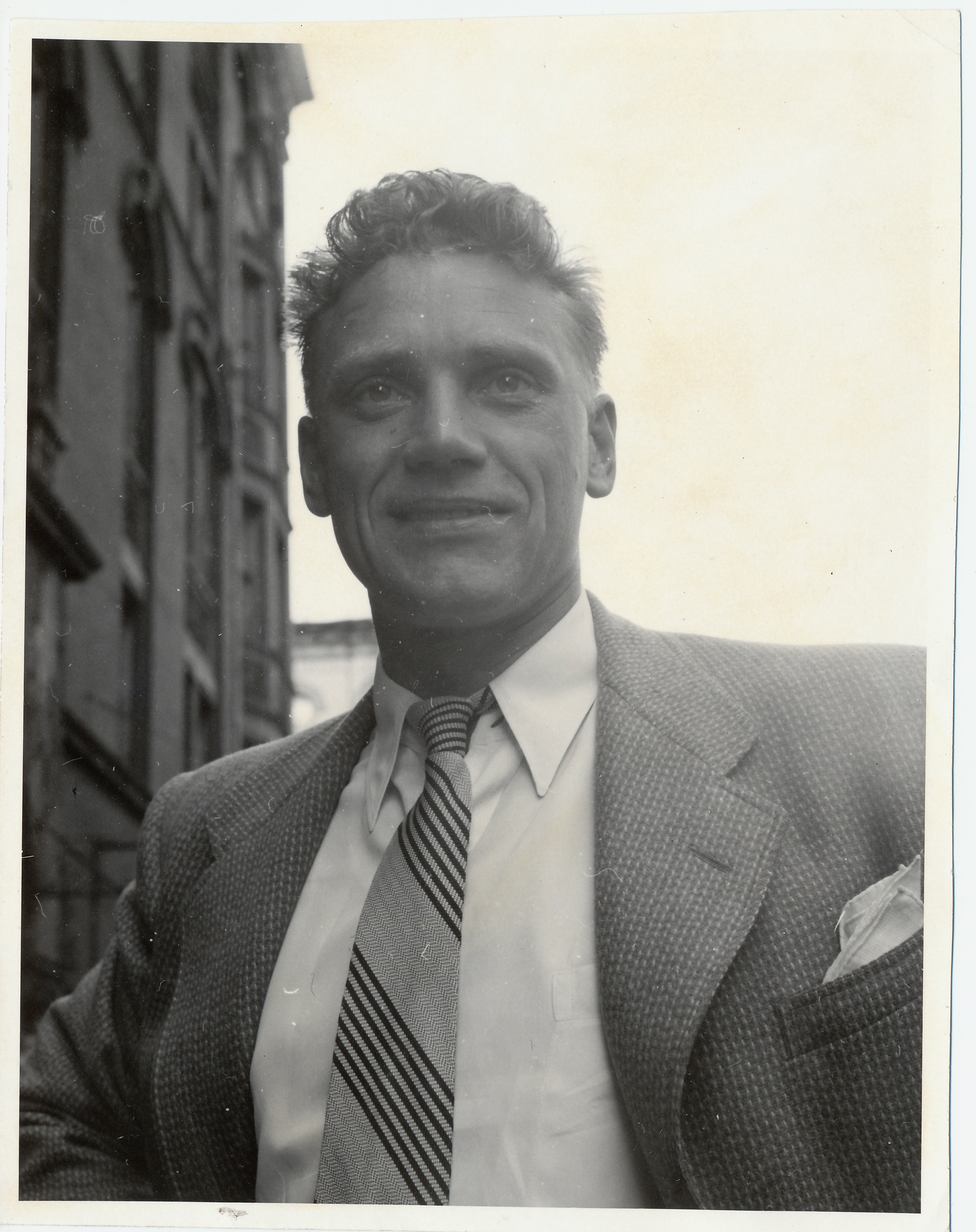
Lauri Törni in 1951

Finnish Army

- 3 September 1938, Conscript (reserves)
- 1 March 1939, Lance Corporal (reserves)
- 9 May 1940, Second Lieutenant (reserves)
- 5 March 1942, Lieutenant (reserves)
- 27 August 1944, Captain (reserves)
- 6 October 1950, removed from officers' list

German Waffen-SS

- 18 May 1941, Untersturmführer (Nordost)
- 15 April 1945, Hauptsturmführer (Sonderkommando Nord)

United States Army

- 28 January 1954, Private
- 20 December 1954, Private First Class
- 28 April 1955, Corporal
- 17 November 1955, Sergeant
- 9 January 1957, 1st Lieutenant, USAR
- 30 November 1960, Captain, USAR
- 16 December 1965, Major, USAR (posthumous)

== Commemoration ==
In the 1965 book The Green Berets by Robin Moore, the "Sven Kornie" (or Captain Steve Kornie) main character in the first chapter was based on Thorne. (Note: Moore's book was published the same year Thorne died. OCLC 422663434 "Kornie, originally a Finn, fought the Russians when they invaded his native land. Later, he had joined the German Army and miraculously survived two years of fighting the Russians on the eastern front." (p. 30) The book was later made into a movie by the same name, starring John Wayne. The Green Berets at the AFI Catalog of Feature Films.)

In the 1990s, Törni's name became better known, with numerous books being written about him. He was named 52nd in the Suuret Suomalaiset listing of famous Finns. In the 2006 Suomen Sotilas (Soldier of Finland) magazine listing, he was elected most courageous of the Mannerheim Cross recipients.

In Finland, the survivors, friends, and families of Detachment Törni formed the Lauri Törni Tradition Guild. The Infantry Museum (Jalkaväkimuseo) in Mikkeli, Finland, has an exhibit dedicated to Törni, as does the Military Museum of Finland in Helsinki.

Even before his death, Thorne achieved an exemplary reputation in US Special Forces. His US memorial is the Larry Thorne Headquarters Building, 10th SFG(A), Fort Carson, Colorado. The 10th Group honours him yearly by presenting the Larry Thorne Award to the best Operational Detachment-Alpha in the command. The Special Forces Association Chapter 33 in Cleveland, Tennessee is named after him.

In 2010, he was named as the first Honorary Member of the United States Army Special Forces Regiment. In 2011, he was inducted into the United States Special Operations Command (USSOCOM) Commando Hall of Honor.

In their 2013 book Tuntematon Lauri Törni (Unknown Lauri Törni), authors Juha Pohjonen and Oula Silvennoinen write that Törni's conviction for treason was justified because the Waffen-SS training he received at the end of World War II was provided to help achieve a National Socialist coup in Finland. This view has been challenged by Törni Heritage Guild members Markku Moberg and Pasi Niittymäki, who acknowledge that Törni faced pressure from the war and alcohol consumption, but contend that he did not support Germany.

Finnish historian and later Minister of Defence (2015–2019) Jussi Niinistö of the right-wing populist Finns Party argued that Törni's training was actually motivated by patriotism towards his native country, and accused Pohjonen and Silvennoinen of stirring up hatred in order to promote sales of their book while disregarding "the fact that in Finland there was a genuine fear that Russia would occupy Finland."

== See also ==
- Aarne Juutilainen
- Aimo Koivunen
- Yang Kyoungjong
- Alpo K. Marttinen

== Sources ==
- Cleverley, J. Michael (2008). Born a Soldier: The Times and Life of Larry Thorne. Booksurge. ISBN 978-1439214374. OCLC 299168934.
  - In 2002, as: A Scent of Glory: The Times and Life of Larry A. Thorne. Athens: Nike Ekdotike. ISBN 9607663489. OCLC 61516770.
  - In Swedish in 2008 as: Lauri Törni Yrke Soldat. Svenskt Militärhistoriskt Bibliotek; ISBN 978-9185789221.
- Gill III, Henry A. (1998). Soldier Under Three Flags: The Exploits of Special Forces' Captain Larry A. Thorne. Ventura, CA: Pathfinder Publishing. ISBN 978-0934793650. OCLC 38468782.
- Kallonen, Kari, Larry Thorne; From Finland´s freezing Winter War to the burning jungles of Vietnam. Readme 2026. ISBN 978-952-416-361-3
- Kallonen, Kari [in Finnish]; Sarjanen, Petri (2004). Leijonamieli: 1919–1949: Mannerheim-ristin ritari kapteeni Lauri Törni alias majuri Larry Thorne [Lionheart 1919–1949: Mannerheim Cross Knight Captain Lauri Törni aka Major Larry Thorne] (in Finnish). Revontuli. ISBN 978-9525170009. OCLC 47915724.
- Lindholm-Ventola, Antti (1988). Lauri Törni ja hänen korpraalinsa, Sotapäiväkirjaa ja muistelmia vuosilta 1942–1944 [Lauri Törni and his Corporal, war diaries and memoirs of the years 1942–1944] (in Finnish). Helsinki: Alea-Kirja Oy. ISBN 978-9519429427. OCLC 57842473.
- McDowell, Jeffrey B. (May–June 2002). "The Search for Larry A. Thorne: Missing in Action, Vietnam". Military Review. 82 (3): 77+. ISSN 0026-4148. OCLC 2558412.
- Rönnquist, Lars; Vuorenmaa, Anssi (1993). Törnin Jääkärit [Törnin Light Infantry] (in Finnish). Porvoo: W. Söderström. ISBN 978-9510194485. OCLC 36900567.
- Salomaa, Markku (2000). "Lauri Torni, soldier". In Marjomaa, Ulpu (ed.). 100 Faces from Finland: A Biographical Kaleidoscope. Fletcher, Roderick (trans.). Helsinki: Finnish Academy of Science & Letters (Finnish Literature Society). pp. 554–557. ISBN 978-9517462150. OCLC 47683663.
- Tyrkkö, Jukka (1975). Lauri Törnin tarina: vapaustaistelijan vaiheita Viipurista Vietnamiin [Lauri Törni story. Freedom Fighter's steps from Vyborg to Vietnam] (in Finnish). Helsinki: Alea-kirja. ISBN 978-9519272177. OCLC 2645931.
