= Tuira, Oulu =

Tuira
- District of Oulu
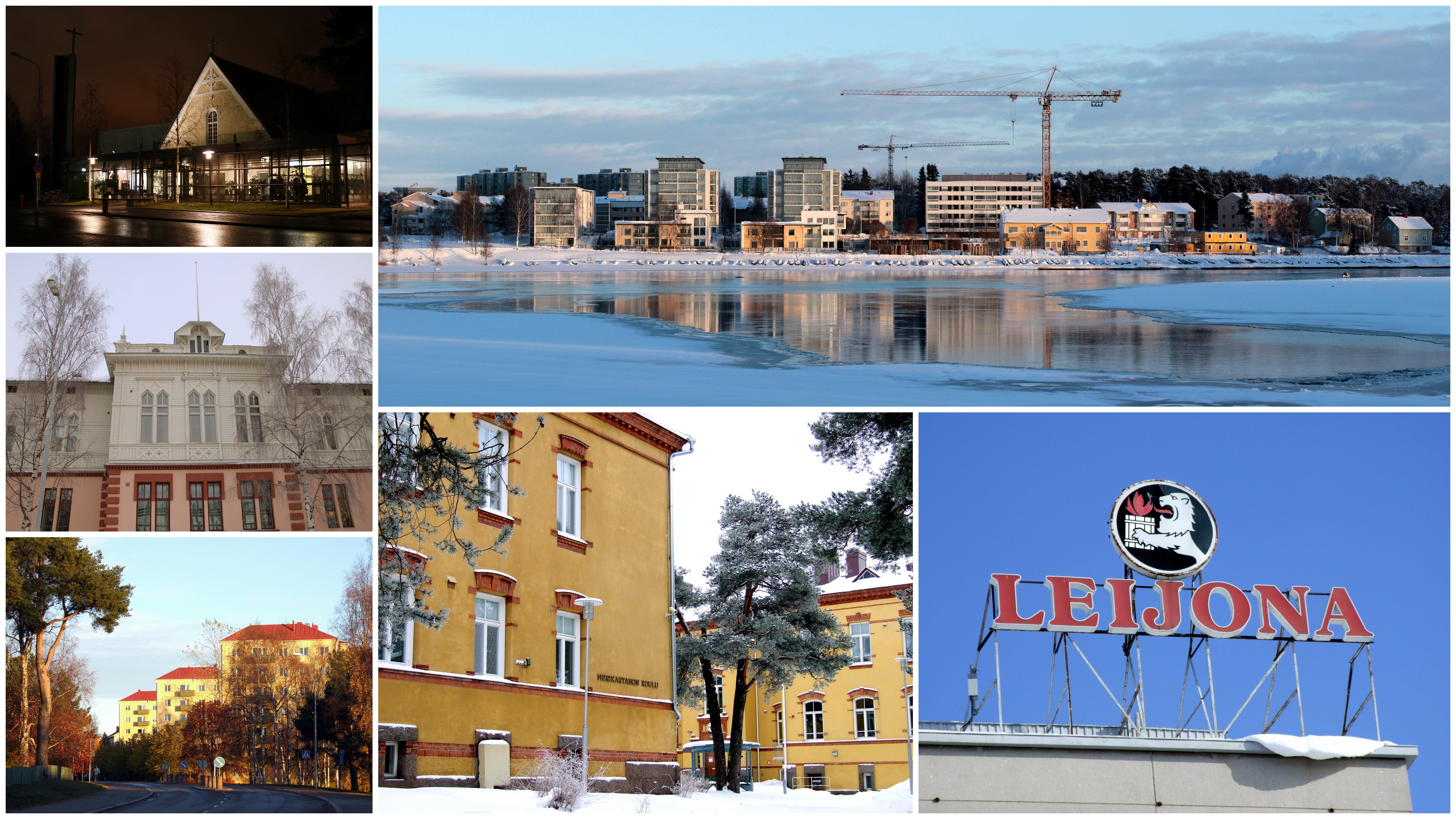
- Interactive map of Tuira
- Coordinates: 65.026°N 25.471°E
- Country: Finland
- City: Oulu
- Areas of Oulu: Tuira area

Population (2013)
  - Total: 6 465
- Postal code: 90500

Tuira is a district of the city of Oulu, Finland. It is located north of city centre across the Oulujoki River. After the first bridges over Oulujoki connecting Tuira with Oulu were built in 1869, population growth of Tuira accelerated and Tuira was annexed by city of Oulu from the neighbouring rural municipality in 1886. Until the 1970s Tuira was a neighbourhood of wooden townhouses, but the new zoning plan of 1969 changed it to a suburb of residential tower blocks.

Merikoskenkatu, a street dividing the line of East and West Tuira, is a major public bus route. The railway station in Tuira was opened in 1903, but the passenger traffic was ended in 1990 and freight traffic in 2002. The station building was dismantled in 1998.

== Points of interest ==
- Tuira Church
- Tuiranpuisto Park
