= Matti Aarnio =

Finnish military officer

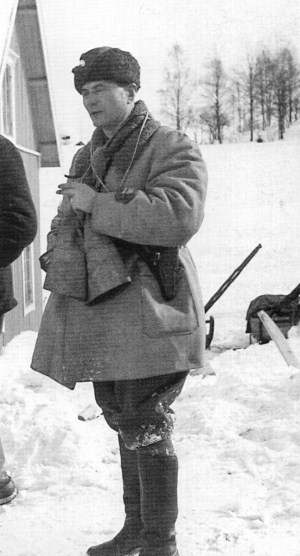
Matti Aarnio

Matti Armas Aarnio, also known as Motti-Matti (24 February 1901, Kouvola – 16 December 1984) was a Finnish military officer and a specialist in motti battles during World War II.

== Career ==
Aarnio was a volunteer with the White Guards at the Savonia Front during the Finnish Civil War. Later, he participated in the Estonian War of Independence, the Latvian War of Independence and the Aunus expedition in East Karelia. Aarnio transferred from active military service to the reserve officer corps in 1920. He graduated from the Kadettikoulu in 1926 and the Sotakorkeakoulu in 1933. Aarnio was promoted as captain in 1929 and served in the Foreign relations department of the General Staff.

During the Winter War, Aarnio was promoted to the rank of Major and commanded the 4th Jaeger battalion (JP 4) to the north of Lake Ladoga. His battalion became known for battles against encircled Red Army troops in the battle of Lemetti. During these motti battles, Aarnio used his eight best battalions, including his own. The tactics of Aarnio—attacking mottis at night and at close range—proved successful. He later received the nickname "Motti-Matti".

During the Continuation War, Aarnio was the commander of the 9th Infantry Regiment. His regiment successfully participated in the Finnish reconquest of Ladoga Karelia in 1941. In December 1941, Aarnio was transferred to command the 56th Infantry Regiment, and in the Lapland War, commanded the 2nd Jaeger Battalion.

In 1945, Aarnio emigrated from Finland and served several years in Venezuela. While in Caracas, Aarnio assisted Finnish expatriate and Mannerheim Cross recipient Lauri Törni as Törni was illegally immigrating to the United States in 1950. He returned to Finland in 1952 and worked in the insurance business.
