= Lodge–Philbin Act =

1950 US federal law allowing recruiting of foreign nationals into the US military

The Lodge–Philbin Act was a U.S. federal law, passed on 30 June 1950, which allowed for the recruiting of foreign nationals into a military force fighting under the command of the U.S. Armed Forces. The Act permitted initially up to 2,500 non-resident aliens (later expanded to allow up to 12,500) to enlist. If they successfully served five years with an honorable discharge, they were guaranteed U.S. citizenship.

The Act was pushed through Congress by Massachusetts Senator Henry Cabot Lodge Jr. during the Cold War, looking especially for recruits from the Eastern Bloc to form infiltration units working in that part of the world. More than 200 Eastern Europeans qualified before the Act expired in 1959. No German nationals or citizens of countries of the Marshall Plan or of NATO were eligible.

Members of this force who died during active service or from injuries or illness during active service – and were inducted or sent to U.S. territory at least once – were entitled to posthumous citizenship. Applications could be filed as recently as November 2004 (or within two years of their death).

For comparison, note that during World War II, foreigners who served just three years were entitled to citizenship.

The military was not interested in recruiting on a large scale from overseas. World War II general and future U.S. president Dwight Eisenhower is quoted in a 1951 Time article as saying, "When Rome went out and hired mercenary soldiers, Rome fell."

== Notable foreigners ==
- Alpo K. Marttinen
- Lauri Törni, later known as Larry Thorne

== See also ==
- French Foreign Legion
