= Huhtiniemi =

Coordinates: 61.0540°N 28.1416°E

Huhtiniemi is a neighborhood in the city of Lappeenranta in South-Eastern Finland. It is located 2 kilometers west of the town center on a cape of the same name, that extends into lake Saimaa in the North. The campus of the Lappeenranta University of Technology is located to the west of Huhtiniemi. The area now contains apartment buildings, camping grounds and student housing of the university.

The area housed a shooting range associated with the military barracks in Lappeenranta, until at least the mid-1970s.

== Secret executions? ==
According to persistent rumors alive since World War II, the area contains mass graves of deserters executed by secret and possibly illegal military tribunals in June 1944 after the Soviet Fourth strategic offensive. The issue first gained publicity in 1971, when 10 bodies were found during construction work for a water mains. New excavations started in 2005, and a mass grave with a further 11 bodies was found in October 2006. The excavations will be ceased until the ground softens at spring 2007.
