= United States Army Forces in the Philippines – Northern Luzon =

- Active: January 1, 1942 – June 30, 1946
- Country: United States of America; Commonwealth of the Philippines
- Type: light infantry, guerrilla resistance movement
- Size: about 20,000 men in 1945
- Part of: United States Army; Philippine Army
- Engagements: World War II * Japanese occupation of the Philippines (1942–44) * Philippines Campaign (1944–45) – Battle of Bacsil Ridge (March 19, 1945) – Battle of Baguio (April 26, 1945) – Battle of Mayoyao Ridge (July 26, 1945, to August 9, 1945) – Battle of Bessang Pass (June 14, 1945)

Commanders
- Notable commanders: Russell W. Volckmann

The United States Army Forces in the Philippines – Northern Luzon or United States Armed Forces in the Philippines – Northern Luzon (USAFIP-NL) (Tagalog: Sandatahang Lakas ng Estados Unidos sa Pilipinas - Hilagang Luzon (SLEUP-HL)/Hukbong Sandatahan ng Estados Unidos sa Pilipinas - Hilagang Luzon (HSEUP-HL) Ilocano: Fuerza Armada ti Estados Unidos iti Filipinas - Amianan ti Luzon (FAEUF-AL)) was the military and guerrilla organization active in the Philippines after the Japanese occupation. It was made up of United States Army and Philippine Army soldiers, reservists and civilian volunteers.

It was active from January 1, 1942 to June 30, 1946 and commanded by Col. Moses, followed by Russell W. Volckmann.

Following the Japanese occupation of the Philippines through the campaign to liberate the country, the military and guerrilla operations from the units of USAFIP-NL operated in Northern Luzon, including the some provinces in Ilocos Norte, Ilocos Sur, La Union, Abra, Mountain Province, Cagayan, Isabela and Nueva Vizcaya.

== Formations ==
Infantry regiments

- 11th Infantry Regiment – Cagayan Valley
- 14th Infantry Regiment – Nueva Vizcaya
- 15th Infantry Regiment – Ilocos Norte
- 66th Infantry Regiment – Baguio and Southern Mountain Province (now. Benguet)
- 121st Infantry Regiment – Ilocos Sur and La Union

Military battalions

- Field Artillery Battalion
- Engineer Combat Battalion
- Military Police Battalion
- Quartermaster Battalion
- Replacement and Casualty Battalion

From November 1943 the forces were organized as districts.

- 1st District – Major Parker Calvert
- 2nd, 3rd Districts – Major George Barnett
- 4th District – Major Ralph Praeger
- 5th District – Major Romulo Manriquez
- 6th District – Capt. Robert Lapham (Lapham did not accept Volckmann's authority and operated the Luzon Guerrilla Army Forces [LGAF] independently.)
- 7th District – Volckmann and Blackburn

== Reorganization ==
Following the Japanese surrender, an in preparation for Philippine independence, the USAFIP, NL, was reorganized as a regular division. It was designated the 2nd Division Philippine Army.

== See also ==
- List of American guerrillas in the Philippines
