= Battle of Baguio =

Battle in the Philippines during World War II

Capture of Baguio
- Part of World War II and the Allied Liberation of the Philippines
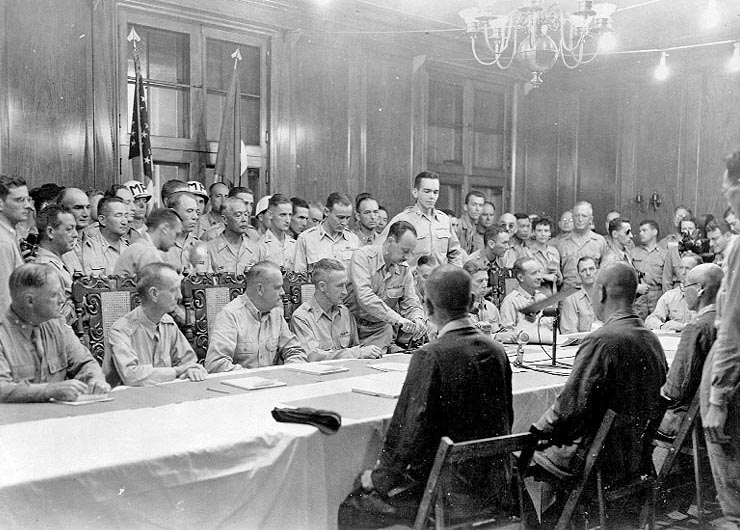
- General Yamashita (center, on the near side of the table) at the surrender ceremony at Camp John Hay on 3 September 1945
Date	21 February – 26 April 1945
Location	Baguio, Mountain Province, Luzon, Philippines
Result	Allied victory
Territorial changes	Allied forces liberate Baguio from Japanese occupiers

Belligerents
United States: Commonwealth of the Philippines	Japan: Second Philippine Republic

Commanders and leaders
(United States) Walter Krueger (United States) Innis P. Swift (United States) Percy W. Clarkson (United States) Robert S. Beightler (United States) Russell W. Volckmann; Calixto Duque	(Empire of Japan) Tomoyuki Yamashita (Empire of Japan) Fukutaro Nishiyama (Empire of Japan) Noakata Utsunomiya (Empire of Japan) Bunzo Sato

Units involved
(United States) Sixth Army: I Corps; 33rd Infantry Division; 37th Infantry Division; (Commonwealth of the Philippines) United States Army Forces in the Philippines – Northern Luzon: 11th Infantry Regiment, USAFIP-NL; 66th Infantry Regiment, USAFIP-NL	(Empire of Japan) Fourteenth Area Army: 23rd Infantry Division; 58th Mixed Brigade

Casualties and losses
	Over 2,000 killed

The Battle of Baguio (Filipino: Labanan sa Baguio; Ilocano: Gubat ti Baguio) occurred between 21 February and 26 April 1945 and was part of the greater Luzon campaign during the Allied liberation of the Philippines at the end of World War II. During the battle, American and Philippine forces recaptured the city of Baguio on the island of Luzon from a Japanese occupation force. One of the last tank engagements of the Philippine campaign took place during the battle. Baguio later became the scene of the final surrender of Japanese forces in the Philippines in September 1945.

== Background ==
Prior to World War II, Baguio was the summer capital of the Commonwealth of the Philippines, as well as the home of the Philippine Military Academy. In 1939, the city had a population of 24,000 people, most of whom were Filipinos, along with other nationalities, including about 500 Japanese. Following the Japanese invasion of the Philippines in 1941, the Japanese used Camp John Hay, an American installation in Baguio, as a military base. In October 1944, American soldiers landed on Leyte, beginning the liberation of the Philippines.

General Tomoyuki Yamashita, the commander of the Japanese Fourteenth Area Army, transferred his headquarters to Baguio in December 1944, planning to fight a delaying action against the Americans to give time for Japan to defend itself. In early January 1945, American forces landed at Lingayen Gulf. Thereafter, the American Sixth Army conducted two campaigns, one against the Japanese forces east of Manila, and the second against Yamashita's forces in northern Luzon.

== Campaign ==
Between late February and early April 1945, the Allied forces, primarily consisting of the United States Army's 33rd Infantry Division, with assistance from regiments of the Philippine guerrilla force United States Army Forces in the Philippines – Northern Luzon, advanced towards Baguio. By late March, the city was within range of American artillery. Between March 4 and 10, United States Fifth Air Force planes dropped 933 tons of bombs and 1,185 gallons of napalm on Baguio, reducing much of the city to rubble. President José P. Laurel of the collaborationist Second Philippine Republic, having moved to Baguio from Manila in December 1944, departed Baguio on 22 March, reaching Taiwan on 30 March; the remainder of the Second Republic government in the Philippines, along with Japanese civilians, were ordered to evacuate Baguio on 30 March. Yamashita and his staff relocated to Bambang. A major offensive to capture Baguio did not occur until mid-April, when United States Army's 37th Infantry Division, minus the 145th Infantry Regiment, was released from garrisoning Manila to launch a two-division assault into Baguio from the west and south.

During the Allied drive towards Baguio from the west, a six-day battle was fought at Irisan Gorge and the nearby Irisan River. This battle involved one of the last tank-versus-tank engagements of the Philippines campaign, between M4 Shermans of the U.S. Army's Company B, 775th Tank Battalion, and Type 97s of the IJA's 5th Tank Company, 10th Tank Regiment.

In mid-April, 7,000 civilians, including foreign nationals, made their way from Baguio to American lines. Among them were five cabinet members of the Second Republic; Brigadier General Manuel Roxas was "freed", the other four were captured as collaborators. On 22 April, Major General Noakata Utsunomiya, who had been left in command of the defense of Baguio by Yamashita, ordered a withdrawal from Baguio. On 24 April, the first Allied forces – a patrol of the 129th Infantry Regiment – entered Baguio.

== Aftermath ==
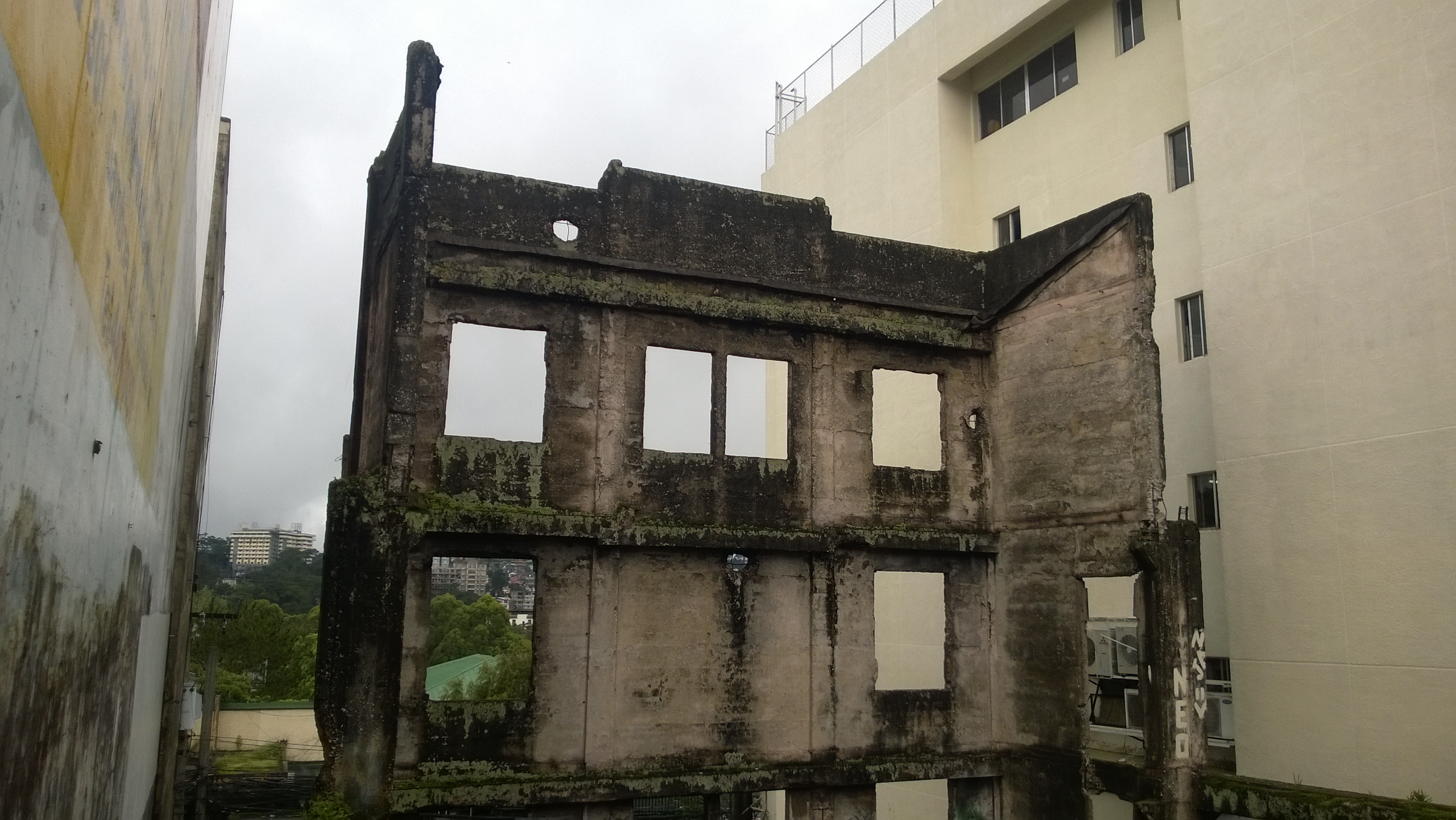
An office building along Session Road destroyed by artillery fire during the Battle of Baguio. The building had been demolished in 2021 to pave way for a new building.

Yamashita, along with 50,500 men of the Shobu Group, held out against the American advance in northern Luzon until 15 August 1945. On 3 September 1945, one day after the official Japanese surrender in Tokyo Bay, Yamashita formally surrendered Japanese forces in the Philippines at Camp John Hay's American Residence in the presence of lieutenant-generals Arthur Percival and Jonathan Wainwright.
