= History of the United States Army Special Forces =

Insignias of the Army Special Forces lineage

1st Special Service Force Shoulder Sleeve Insignia (SSI), 1942–1944

The Office of Strategic Services insignia, 1942–1945

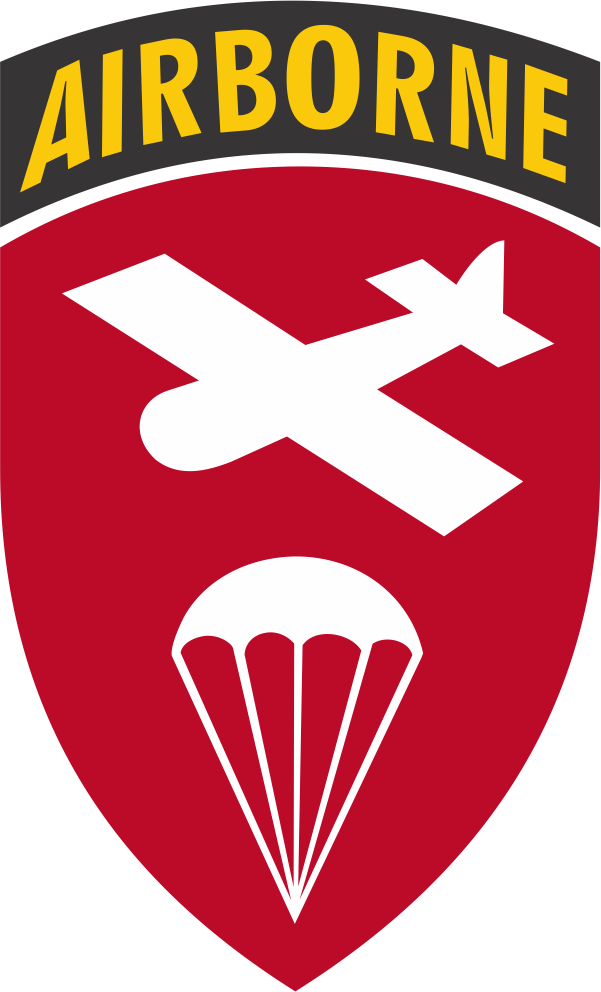
Airborne Command SSI, worn by classified U.S. Army units, 1952–1959

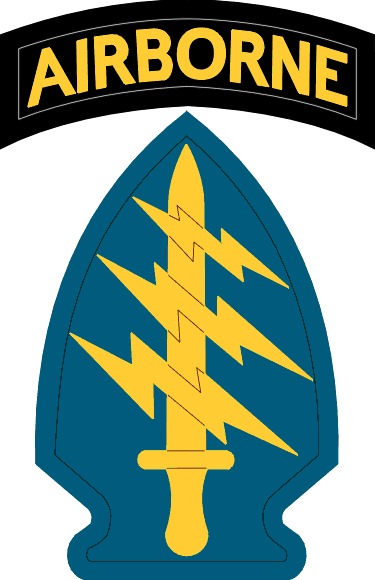
Special Forces Command (Airborne) SSI 1955–2016 then 1st Special Forces Command (Airborne) SSI 2016–present

U.S. Army reveals the existence of the Special Forces in Europe, circa 1959

U.S. Army Special Forces, circa 1962

Special Operations overview, circa 1984 (51:52)

The U.S. Army Special Forces traces its roots as the Army's premier proponent of unconventional warfare from purpose-formed special operations units like the Alamo Scouts, Philippine guerrillas, First Special Service Force, and the Operational Groups (OGs) of the Office of Strategic Services. Although the OSS was not an Army organization, many Army personnel were assigned to the OSS and later used their experiences to influence the forming of Special Forces.

During the Korean War, individuals such as former Philippine guerrilla commanders Col. Wendell Fertig and Lt. Col. Russell W. Volckmann used their wartime experience to formulate the doctrine of unconventional warfare that became the cornerstone of the Special Forces.

In 1951, Major General Robert A. McClure chose former OSS member Colonel Aaron Bank as Operations Branch Chief of the Special Operations Division of the Psychological Warfare Staff (OCPW) in the Pentagon.

In June 1952, the 10th Special Forces Group (Airborne) was formed under Col. Aaron Bank, soon after the establishment of the Psychological Warfare School, which ultimately became today's John F. Kennedy Special Warfare Center and School. The 10th Special Forces Group (Airborne) was split, with the cadre that kept the designation 10th SFG deployed to Bad Tölz, Germany, in September 1953. The remaining cadre at Fort Bragg formed the 77th Special Forces Group, which in May 1960 was reorganized and designated as today's 7th Special Forces Group.

Since their establishment in 1952, Special Forces soldiers have operated in Vietnam, Cambodia, Laos, North Vietnam, Guatemala, Nicaragua, El Salvador, Colombia, Panama, Haiti, Somalia, Bosnia, Kosovo, 1st Gulf War, Afghanistan, Iraq, the Philippines, Syria, Yemen, Niger and, in an FID role, East Africa.

== Creation ==
Their lineage dates back to include more than 200 years of unconventional warfare history, with notable predecessors including the American Revolutionary War "Swamp Fox" Francis Marion, Benjamin Forsyth in the War of 1812, Frederick Funston of the Philippine–American War, the WWII OSS Jedburgh Teams, OSS Detachment 101 in Burma, the Alamo Scouts, Colt Terry of the Korean War, and Vietnam War United States Army Special Forces officer Richard J. Meadows.

Some of the Office of Strategic Services were similar in terms of the mission with the original U.S. Army Special Forces function, unconventional warfare (UW), acting as cadre to train and lead guerrillas in occupied countries. The Special Forces motto, De oppresso liber (Latin: "to free the oppressed") reflects this historical mission of guerrilla warfare against an occupying power. Specifically, the three-man Jedburgh teams provided leadership to French Resistance units. The larger Office of Strategic Services "OSS" Operational Groups (OG) were more associated with Strategic Reconnaissance/Direct Action (SR/DA) missions, although they did work with resistance units.

Another unit widely associated with the origins of the Army Special Forces was the First Special Service Force, a joint Canadian-American unit formed in 1942 and disbanded in 1944. Members of the First Special Service Force were retroactively awarded the Special Forces Tab upon its creation in 1983 for their part in Special Forces' history. Each year, a joint 1st Special Forces Group-Canadian Special Operations Regiment exercise, known as Menton Week is held to commemorate the historical link that both units share in the First Special Service Force.

While Filipino American guerrilla operations in the Japanese-occupied Philippines are not part of the direct lineage of Army Special Forces, some of the early Special Forces leadership had been involved with those operations. They would use what they had learned fighting as guerilla units in the doctrine of unconventional warfare in the Special Forces. They included Russell Volckmann, who commanded guerrillas in Northern Luzon and in Korea, Donald Blackburn, who also served with the Northern Luzon force, and Colonel Wendell Fertig, who developed a division-sized force on Mindanao.

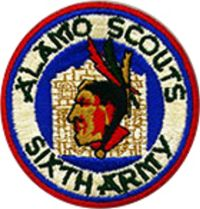
The "U.S. 6th Army Special Reconnaissance Unit" aka the Alamo Scouts included in the lineage of the U.S. Special Forces

The Korean War, which began in 1950, was a shock to the US military and highlighted the deficiencies in psychological warfare. In spite of this, United Nations Partisan Forces Korea operated on islands and behind enemy lines. These forces were also known as the 8086th Army Unit, and later as the Far East Command Liaison Detachment, Korea, FECLD-K 8240th Army Unit. These troops directed North Korean partisans in raids, harassment of supply lines, and the rescue of downed pilots. Experience gained in the Korean War by these units influenced the development of U.S. Army Special Forces doctrine.

Special Forces were formed in 1952, initially under the U.S. Army Psychological Warfare Division headed by then Brigadier General Robert A. McClure, due to the identified need to have psychological warfare capabilities. McClure specialized in psychological warfare but had little experience in unconventional warfare, though he believed the two were inextricably linked.

Special Operations Command was formed by the U.S. Army Psychological Warfare Center which was activated in May 1952. The initial 10th Special Forces Group was formed in June 1952 and was commanded by Colonel Aaron Bank who is known as the father of Special Forces. The first Executive Officer was LTC William C. Martin, Jr. The 10th SFG's formation coincided with the establishment of the Psychological Warfare School, which is now known as the John F. Kennedy Special Warfare Center and School. Bank served with various Office of Strategic Services (OSS) units, including Jedburgh teams advising and leading French Resistance units before the Battle of Normandy ("D-Day" invasion) of 6 June 1944. LTC Martin was a mustang, having enlisted at age 17; he was promoted to second lieutenant during WWII. Before being commissioned he was the US VIIth Army's Boxing Champion for his weight class. He served as a company commander with the 82 Airborne and saw action in North Africa, Sicily, Market Garden, and the Battle of the Bulge. He received his third combat jump star in Korea while serving with the 187th Regimental Combat Team. He retired as an LTC at age 37 while serving in Bad Tölz with the 10th Special Forces Group.

The 10th SFG deployed to Bad Tölz, Germany the following September. The remaining cadre at Fort Bragg, North Carolina formed the 77th Special Forces Group, which in May 1960 became 7th Special Forces Group.

The Special Forces branch was established as a basic branch of the United States Army on 9 April 1987, by Army General Order No. 35.

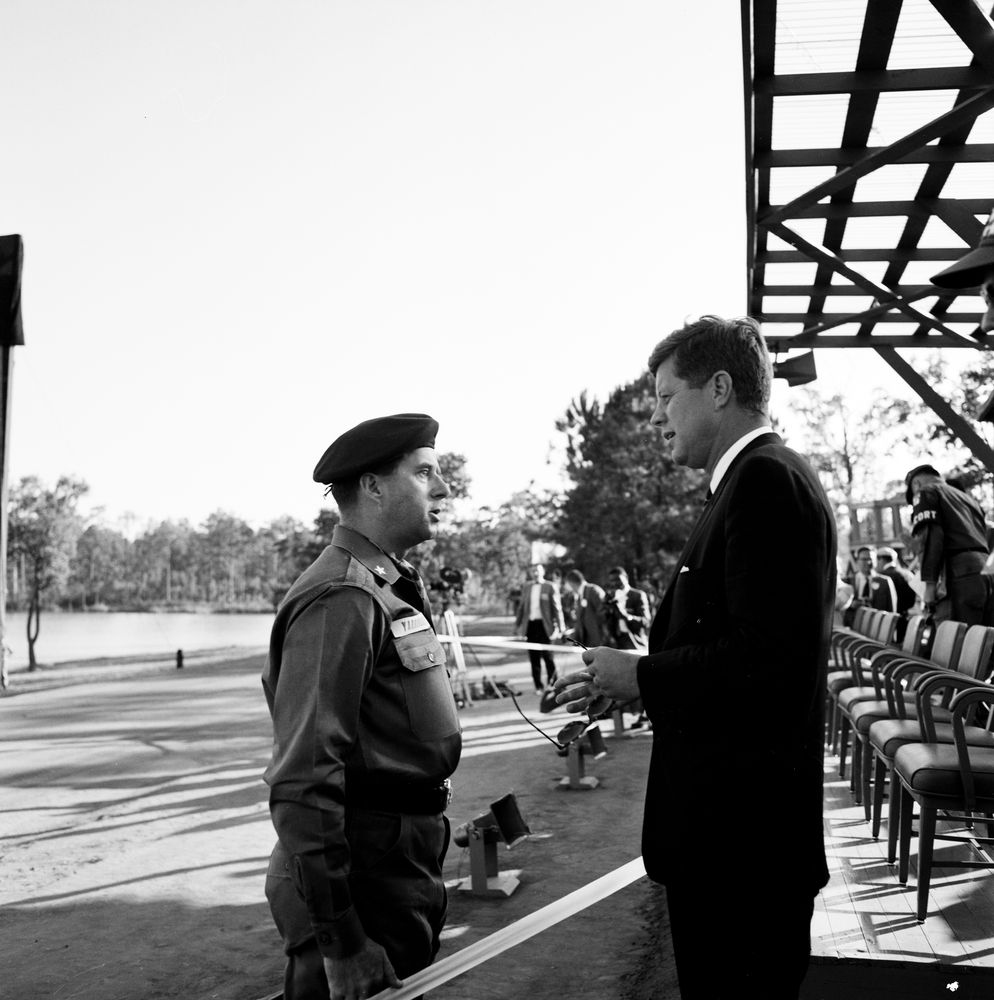
Brigadier General William P. Yarborough (left) meets with President John F. Kennedy at Fort Bragg, N.C., 12 Oct. 1961

== First deployment in Cold War-era Europe ==
10th Special Forces Group was responsible, among other missions, to operate a stay-behind guerrilla operation after a presumed Soviet overrunning of Western Europe, in conjunction with the program that later became controversially known as Operation Gladio. Through the Lodge-Philbin Act, it acquired a large number of Eastern European immigrants who brought many areas and language skills.

Green Light Teams were Special Forces units during the height of the Cold War with the Soviet Union. These Green Light Teams, also referred to as Atomic Demolition Munitions Specialists, were trained to advance, arm, and deploy Special Atomic Demolition Munitions behind enemy lines.

As well as preparing for the Warsaw Pact invasion that never came, Vietnam and other areas of South Vietnam, El Salvador, Colombia, Panama and Afghanistan are the major modern conflicts that have defined the Special Forces.

== Southeast Asia (Indochina Wars) ==
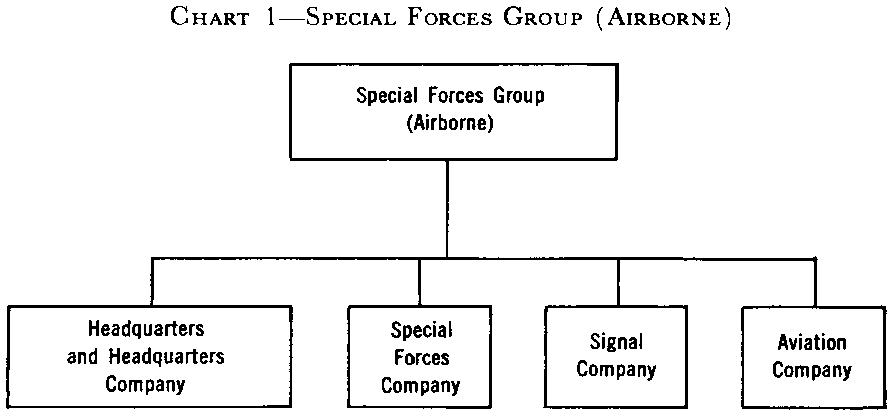
Special Forces Group organization in the Vietnam Era

The Vietnam era saw the testing and shaping of Special Forces policy and action for the United States. The mission of the Special Forces changed rapidly in the first years from a force that had initially been used like its WWII predecessors as an internal strike force into a training force which helped develop unconventional warfare and counterinsurgency tactics. The period between 1961 and 1965 was especially formative.

The first U.S. Special Forces operations in Vietnam were in 1957, when soldiers from the 1st Special Forces Group trained fifty-eight Vietnamese Army soldiers at the Commando Training Center in Nha Trang. Special Forces units deployed to Laos as "Mobile Training Teams" (MTTs) in 1961, Project White Star (later named Project 404), and they were among the first U.S. troops committed to the Vietnam War. Beginning in the early 1950s, Special Forces teams deployed from the United States and Okinawa to serve as advisers for the fledgling South Vietnamese Army. As the United States escalated its involvement in the war, the missions of the Special Forces expanded as well. Since Special Forces were trained to lead guerrillas, it seemed logical that they would have a deep understanding of counter-guerrilla actions, which became the Foreign Internal Defense (FID) mission. The 5th Special Forces Group mixed the UW and FID missions, often leading Vietnamese units such as Montagnards and lowland Civilian Irregular Defense Groups. The deep raid on Son Tay, attempting to recover U.S. prisoners of war, had a ground element completely made up of Special Forces soldiers.

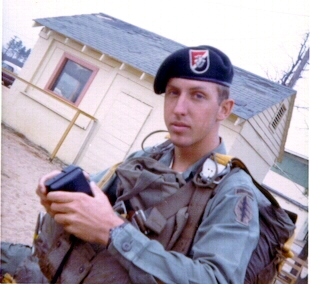
B. R. Lang, wearing 6th SFG flash, 1970. (TDY Laos Project 404; 1971 Studies and Observations Group).

The main SF unit in South Vietnam was the 5th Special Forces Group (Airborne). SF soldiers assigned to the 5th Group earned sixteen Medals of Honor in Vietnam, making it the most prominently decorated unit for its size in that conflict. The unit was also awarded the coveted Presidential Unit Citation for extraordinary heroism during the Vietnam War from 1 November 1966 – 31 January 1968. Army Special Forces personnel also played predominant roles in the highly secret, covert, multi-service Military Assistance Command Vietnam Studies and Observation Group (MACV-SOG), with a large number of covert U.S. military personnel killed or lost MIA while operating on Studies and Observations Group (SOG) reconnaissance missions in Laos and Cambodia. During the prolonged conflict the Army Special Forces trained regular and paramilitary units of several Allied nations as well as US reconnaissance members; supervised the indigenous Civilian Irregular Defense Group stationed throughout Vietnam in fortified camps and as backup reserves; monitored the border region and infiltration routes; conducted strategic intelligence missions and fielded numerous elements engaged in special operational tasks.

From 1957 to 1973, over 20,000 Special Forces soldiers served out of a total of 3.2 million American servicemen, who were deployed throughout the war. Of these 882 died, killed in action or went missing in Southeast Asia (including 121 in Laos and 32 in Cambodia). The "Green Beret Affair": U. S. Special Forces received a severe damage to its reputation when in July 1969 Colonel Robert Rheault, Commander of 5th Special Forces Group (Airborne), six subordinate military intelligence officers, attached to MACVSOG's Project GAMMA Operational Detachment B-57 including his headquarters staff intelligence officer, and a sergeant first class (SFC) were arrested for the murder of Thai Khac Chuyen, a suspected North Vietnamese double agent. It was suspected that Chuyen was providing the North Vietnamese Army information about Project GAMMA and the indigenous agents used by the 5th Special Forces Group. Thai Khac Chuyen's name was found on captured documents recovered from a MACV-SOG recon mission in Laos. An attempted cover-up was uncovered when the SFC became concerned that he might be a 'fall guy' and contacted the local Central Intelligence Agency (CIA) office chief. In September 1969 Secretary of the Army Stanley Resor announced that all charges would be dropped since the CIA, in the interests of national security, had refused to make its personnel available as witnesses; implying some sort of involvement.

== El Salvador ==
In the 1980s, U.S. Army Special Forces trainers were deployed to El Salvador. Their mission was to train the Salvadoran Military, who at the time were fighting a civil war against the left-wing guerrillas of the Farabundo Marti National Liberation Front (FMLN). In 1992, the FMLN reached a ceasefire agreement with the government of El Salvador. Following the success of SF in El Salvador, the 3rd Special Forces Group was reactivated in 1990.

== Colombia ==
In the late 1980s, major narcotics trafficking and terrorist problems within the region covered by the Southern Command (USSOUTHCOM) worsened. USSOUTHCOM was (and remains) responsible for all of South America, Central America, and the Caribbean (CARIBCOM). The 7th Special Forces Group deployed detachments, trainers and advisers in conjunction with teams from the 1st Psychological Operations Battalion to assist Host Nation (HN) forces. During the late 1990s, 7 SFG(A) also deployed to Colombia and trained three Counter Narcotics Battalions and assisted in the establishment of a Brigade Headquarters. These were the first units of their kind in Colombia and each is known as "Batallón Contra Narcotraficantes" or BACNA. These elements continue to be very successful against the narcotics industry which thrives in Colombia. U.S. Army Special Forces detachments still rotate among various locations within Colombia, training HN units in counter-guerrilla and counter-narcotics roles, and SF detachments routinely deploy to other countries within the USSOUTHCOM area of responsibility.

== Invasion of Panama ==
In late 1988, tensions between the United States and Panama were extremely high with the Panamanian leader, Manuel Noriega, calling for the dissolution of the agreement that allowed the United States to have bases in his country. In December 1989 President George H. W. Bush activated the planning section for Operation Just Cause/Promote Liberty. Just Cause was the portion of the mission to depose Noriega and return Panama to democracy. Originally scheduled to begin at 0200 hrs. on 20 December, it actually kicked off at 2315 hrs when part of a Special Forces detachment that was waiting for the signal to begin was discovered above a gate above a Panamanian checkpoint. Just Cause was the first mission to have a very large contingent of Special Operations Forces on the ground. The units that were involved with the mission were as follows: Task Force Green (Delta Force), Task Force Black (7th SFG), 5th SFG, 3rd SFG, 4th PSYOP Group, the reinforced 1st Brigade of the 82nd Airborne Division, and all three battalions of the 75th Rangers, and numerous other units from other forces such as the Navy SEALs, Marine Force Recon, and Air Force Combat Control Teams. Of the 23 US troops who died in the invasion four were Navy SEALs. The invasion was successful at deposing Noriega, but led to widespread looting and lawlessness in the following weeks.

== Persian Gulf War ==
On August 2, 1990, Iraq invaded its neighbor Kuwait, The US and other nations around the world sent its forces to Saudi Arabia to protect the country and eventually liberate Kuwait. In October 1990, the 5th Special Forces Group was the first Special Forces unit into action. They deployed along the Saudi-Kuwait border with a Saudi Special Forces, they patrolled the border, setting up bases in border forts and had several firefights with Iraqi forces. They were the eyes and ears of the coalition force, they also provided outposts where Iraqi deserters could surrender, be interrogated and provided valuable intelligence. The 5th Special Forces continued their border activities until 10 February 1991 when they were replaced by lead elements from regular units. US Special forces also played a vital role in acting as liaison with Arab members of the coalition, every Arab unit went into action with Special Forces team with them, where displaying valor and courage on many occasions. They continued to play a role up to the war's end, carrying out missions behind enemy lines.

== War on Terror ==
=== War in Afghanistan ===
==== Operation Enduring Freedom – Afghanistan ====
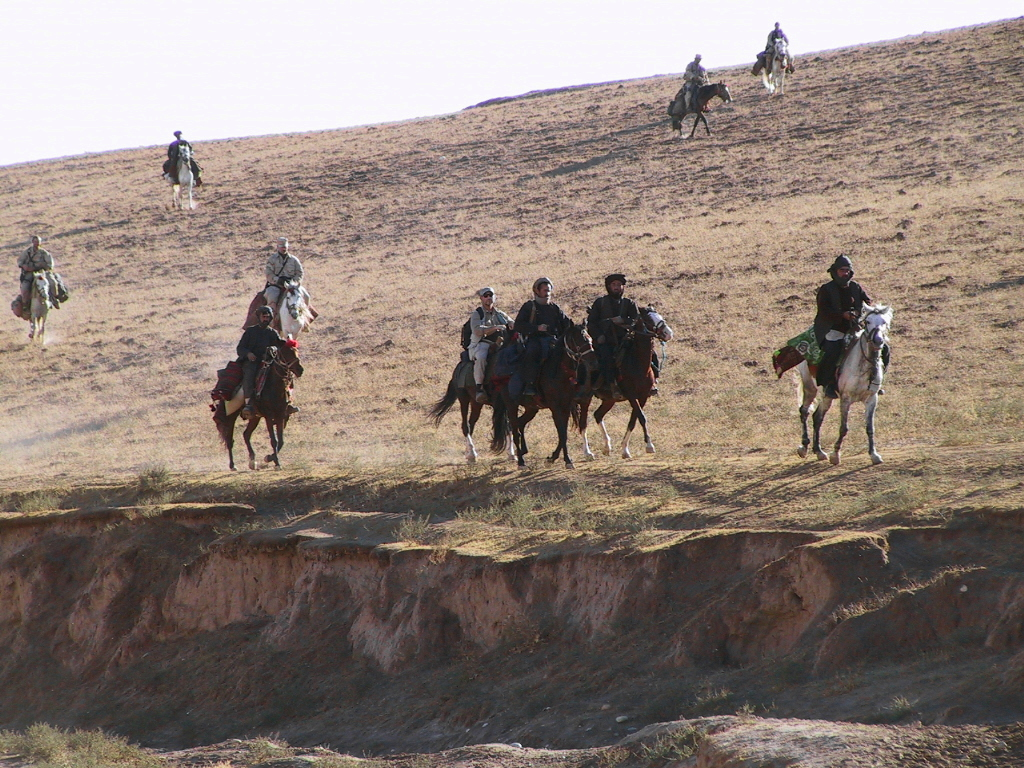
U.S. Army Special Forces and U.S. Air Force Combat Controllers with Northern Alliance troops on horseback during the invasion of Afghanistan, 12 November 2001.

Immediately after the September 11 attack on the United States, President George W. Bush instructed Defense Secretary Donald Rumsfeld to come up with a plan to defeat the Taliban in Afghanistan who harbored Al Qaeda. General Tommy Franks, then-commanding general of Central Command, initially proposed a conventional force invasion of Afghanistan with 60,000 troops. He told Bush and Rumsfeld that it would take six months to launch the campaign. Rumsfeld heatedly rejected this plan, demanding that troops be sent in immediately. Franks returned the next day with a plan to utilize special forces, which Bush approved.

For the 2001 invasion of Afghanistan, Task Force Dagger was established on 10 October 2001, the unit was built around the 5th SFG with helicopter support from the 160th SOAR, TF Dagger was assigned to northern Afghanistan and tasked with infiltrating ODA teams into Afghanistan to advise and support the commanders of the Northern Alliance. Task Force K-Bar was also established around a Naval Special Warfare Group consisting of SEAL Teams 2, 3, 8 and Green Berets from 1st Battalion 3rd SFG, the task force would primarily conduct special reconnaissance and site exploitation missions – intelligence gathering at former enemy locations, some 3rd SFG ODAs were also given the Foreign Internal Defence and Unconventional Warfare role. The TFs were part of the CJSOTF (Combined Joint Special Operations Task Force) under the overall leadership of General Tommy Franks, Coalition Forces Commander (CENTCOM) p. 25, p. 27

The Northern Alliance was outnumbered, outgunned, and undersupplied. It controlled only about 15 percent of Afghanistan. Senior U.S. commanders hoped at best that the Green Berets would boost Northern Alliance morale and help prevent the better-equipped Taliban forces from a further offensive until larger American forces could arrive.

During the night of 18–19 October 2001, Operational Detachment Alpha (ODA) 595, a 12-man Green Beret team, plus two Air Force Combat Controllers, were airlifted from Karshi-Khanabad Air Base in Uzbekistan more than 300 kilometers (190 mi) across the 16,000 feet (4,900 m) Hindu Kush mountains in zero-visibility conditions.

They rode aboard two SOAR MH-47E Chinook helicopters and were escorted by two MH-60L DAPs (Direct Action Penetrators). The Chinooks were refueled in-flight three times during the 11-hour mission, establishing a new world record for combat rotorcraft missions at the time. They linked up with the CIA and the Northern Alliance. They were greeted by CIA paramilitary officers from the Special Activities Division who had arrived only 10 days before.

At about the same time, ODA 555 landed hundreds of miles south in the Panjshir Valley, and linked up with another Northern Alliance force. Within a few weeks the Northern Alliance, with assistance from the U.S. ground and air forces, captured several key cities from the Taliban. On 20 October 2001, an element of ODA 595 guided in the first JDAM bomb from a B-52, impressing General Dostum and his Northern Alliance forces who soon used it for Psychological warfare – taunted the Taliban over their radio frequencies.

On 9 November 2001, ODA 595 and ODA 534 and the seven members of the CIA's Special Activities Division assisted about 2000 members of the Northern Alliance who attacked and liberated Mazari Sharif on horseback, foot, pickup trucks, and BMP armored personnel carriers.

On November 11, in the central north of Afghanistan, ODA 586 was advising General Daoud Khan outside the city of Taloqan and coordinating a batch of preparatory airstrikes when the General surprised everyone by launching an impromptu massed infantry assault on the Taliban holding the city. Before the first bomb could be dropped, the city fell.

On 12 and 13 November, ODA 555 assisted the Northern Alliance forces in the capture of Kabul. On November 14, 2001, ODA 574 and Hamid Karzai inserted into Uruzgan Province via 4 MH-60K helicopters and later fought the Battle of Tarwinkot with a small force of guerrillas.

On 23 November, ODA 586 assisted General Daoud Khan forces in the taking Kunduz. On 25 November, a headquarters element from 3rd Battalion, 5th SFG, along with British SBS and other US forces took part in the Battle of Qala-i-Jangi, on 27 November, during a CAS mission, 5 Green Berets were wounded by a misdirected JDAM. Various ODA's took part in the taking of Kandahar.

On 5 December 2001, a 2,000lb GPS-guided bomb landed among the Green Berets from ODA 574, killing 3 members and wounding the rest of the team, over 20 of Karzai's militia were also killed and Karzai himself slightly wounded. ODB 570 and ODA 524 were immediately dispatched by helicopter to assist with the wounded and to eventually replace the fallen operators of ODA 574. ODA 572 and a CIA Jawbreaker team (small group of CIA SAD ground branch operators) were dispatched to eastern Afghanistan where they recruited some 2,500 to 3,000 into the Afghan Militia Force to take part in the Battle of Tora Bora. On December 20, following the battle, ODA 561 were inserted into the White Mountains to support ODA 572 in conducting sensitive site exploitation of the caves and to assist with recovering DNA samples from terrorist bodies.

Time reported that on 4 January 2002, Green Beret SFC Scott Neil jumped out the back of an MH-53 half a mile from a suspected al-Qaeda compound, 140 miles south of Kabul. With just one-hour on-scene time due to limited helicopter fuel, Neil rushed through AK-47 fire and overcame the al-Qaeda fighters; intelligence from the compound proved it to be an al-Qaeda way station, containing hundreds of fake passports to give terrorists new identities, and multiple computers, powered by car batteries and linked to satellite phones for internet connection.

In March 2002, as part of Task Force K-Bar, ODAs from 3rd SFG took part in Operation Anaconda, at around midnight on March 2, Task Force Hammer (consisting of Special Forces A-teams Texas 14/ODA 594 and 450 Afghan Militia Fighters led by Commander Zia Lodin) left their base at Gardez to take part in the operation. They were to enter the Shahikot valley from the north, then they would assault through the villages of Serkhankheyl and Marzak, where intelligence indicated that the enemy was concentrated, and channel fleeing enemy into the Task Force Rakkasan blocking positions Several soldiers were injured when their truck overturned due to the poor condition of the road, they decided to use their headlights, even though they would lose the element of surprise. An AC-130 Gunship, callsign Grim 31, that was providing fire support and reconnaissance for the operation, spotted the convoy; and due to a problem with the aircraft's inertial navigation system the aircraft failed to identify the Column as friendly unit. Grim 31 engaged the convoy killing CWO Stanley Harriman and wounding two other Green Berets and Afghan militia. The main body of TF Hammer reached the startline at 0615 and waited for the preplanned aerial bombardment of previously identified terrorist positions that would last 55 minutes, however only 6 bombs were dropped because the second B-1B on its bombing run had a bomb stuck in the launch bay, while the third bomber waited for the B-1B to get permission to jettison the bomb and go around again, both planes and two F-15Es received orders to cease the bombardment, an order that may have been intended for Grim 31. Already demoralized from the lack of air support TF Hammer were raked with mortar fire from al-Qaeda fighters that had been registered in advance of the operation, causing the Afghan militia to suffer over 40 casualties. TF Hammer attack stalled before it even entered the valley, due to heavy small arms fire and mortar fire, they also lacked close air support, which had been assigned to TF Anvil on the other side of the ridge; CIA intelligence also revealed that the al-Qaeda terrorists were in the peaks of the mountains rather than in the villages TF Hammer was supposed to assault. These setbacks caused the AMF to scatter and refuse to advance any further, however TF Hammers did distract the enemy forces from TF Rakkasan deployment. TF Rakkasan and the Green Berets of TF Hammer fought all day with the AFO teams calling in continuous airstrikes on al-Qaeda positions. The valley was eventually cleared by March 12.

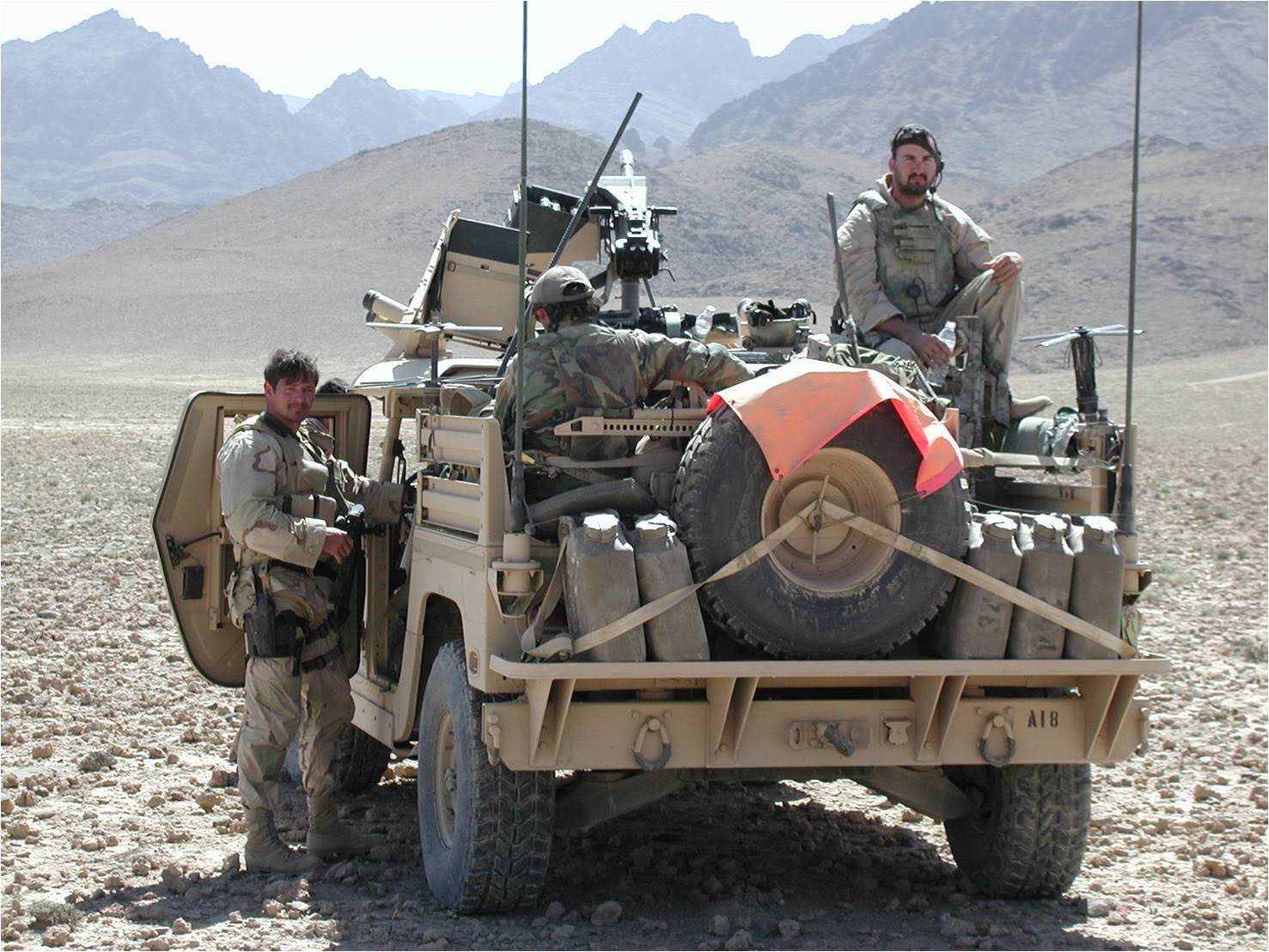
US Special Forces in Gayan Valley, eastern Afghanistan, 19 July 2003.

Also in March 2002, CJTF-180 took over command and control of SOF forces in Afghanistan. On May 19, a Green Beret from Support Company, 2nd Battalion, 19th SFG, was killed while on patrol in Paktita. Later in 2002, CJSOFT became a single integrated command under the broader CJTF-180 that commanded all US forces assigned to OEF-A, it was built around an Army Special Forces Group (often composed of National Guard units) and SEAL teams, in September 2002, the 20th SFG and 2nd Battalion 7th SFG has assumed the role of CJSOTF-Afghanistan allowing the 3rd SFG to be part of the invasion of Iraq.

Until the arrival of General Stanley McChrystal in 2009, counterinsurgency was focused on Direct Action against insurgents on a localised level and often led by Green Beret teams, who were also recruiting and training Afghan Militia Forces to provide security in their area of operations. The ODAs were assigned either an offensive or Direct Action role which would have them operation in far-flung provinces with locally recruited militia, or they would be assigned to an FID (Foreign Internal Defence) detail which saw them partnered with Afghan Army battalions in a training and mentoring role.

In 2007, the Green Berets FID role succeeded in creating the first two Afghan Commando units. Green Beret ODAs often worked closely with the Romanian special forces, they took part in joint patrols, deploying hybrid ODAs of both Romanian and American soldiers.

On January 25, 2008, a small element of U.S. and Afghan National Army soldiers led by SSG Robert James Miller was conducting a combat reconnaissance patrol through the Gowardesh Valley, Kunar Province, when they engaged a force of 15–20 insurgents occupying prepared fighting positions. After calling in close air support, Staff Sergeant Miller led a small squad forward to conduct battle damage assessment when over 100 insurgents ambushed the squad, Miller displayed extraordinary valor by drawing fire away from his squad, killing 10 insurgents in the process. His actions cost him his life, but he saved the lives of 7 members of his team and 15 Afghan National Army soldiers, he was awarded the Medal of Honor.

In September 2008, a Green Beret ODA conducted a joint operation with 1 Troop 3 Squadron SASR in northwest Uruzgan Province, the operation was designed to lure insurgents into a trap using a ground convoy of five special forces GMV trucks as bait. SASR sniper teams, who inserted on foot the night before as part of two cut-off groups to overwatch the patrol. The plan worked, a small group of insurgents approached the vehicles, intent on ambushing the convoy, they were engaged by the SASR snipers. Minutes later a Toyota Hilux appeared carrying a number of armed insurgents, they were engaged and killed and a second vehicle, a van, arrived carrying 3 insurgents were engaged by the sniper teams until they spotted a female non-combatant who was used as a human shield by the surviving insurgent, the insurgent was eventually killed with no harm to the woman, a total of 13 insurgents were killed. In the mid-afternoon on September 2, in the Ana Kalay Valley, following a similar ruse that killed 7 insurgents, 39 Green Berets, SASR soldiers and Afghan Police on five GMVs were returning to an American patrol base when they were engaged by small arms and RPG fire from four firing points, starting the Battle of Khaz Oruzgan. One Green Beret was seriously wounded, a U.S. JTAC called in a flight of F/A-18 Hornets that conducted gun runs against the insurgents and returned to drop JDAMs on a group of insurgents, as the patrol moved with their vehicles more troops were hit, they eventually arrived at the patrol base, of the 13 wounded- 7 were SASR soldiers and a Green Beret was killed; one SASR soldier was awarded the Victoria Cross for his actions during the battle.

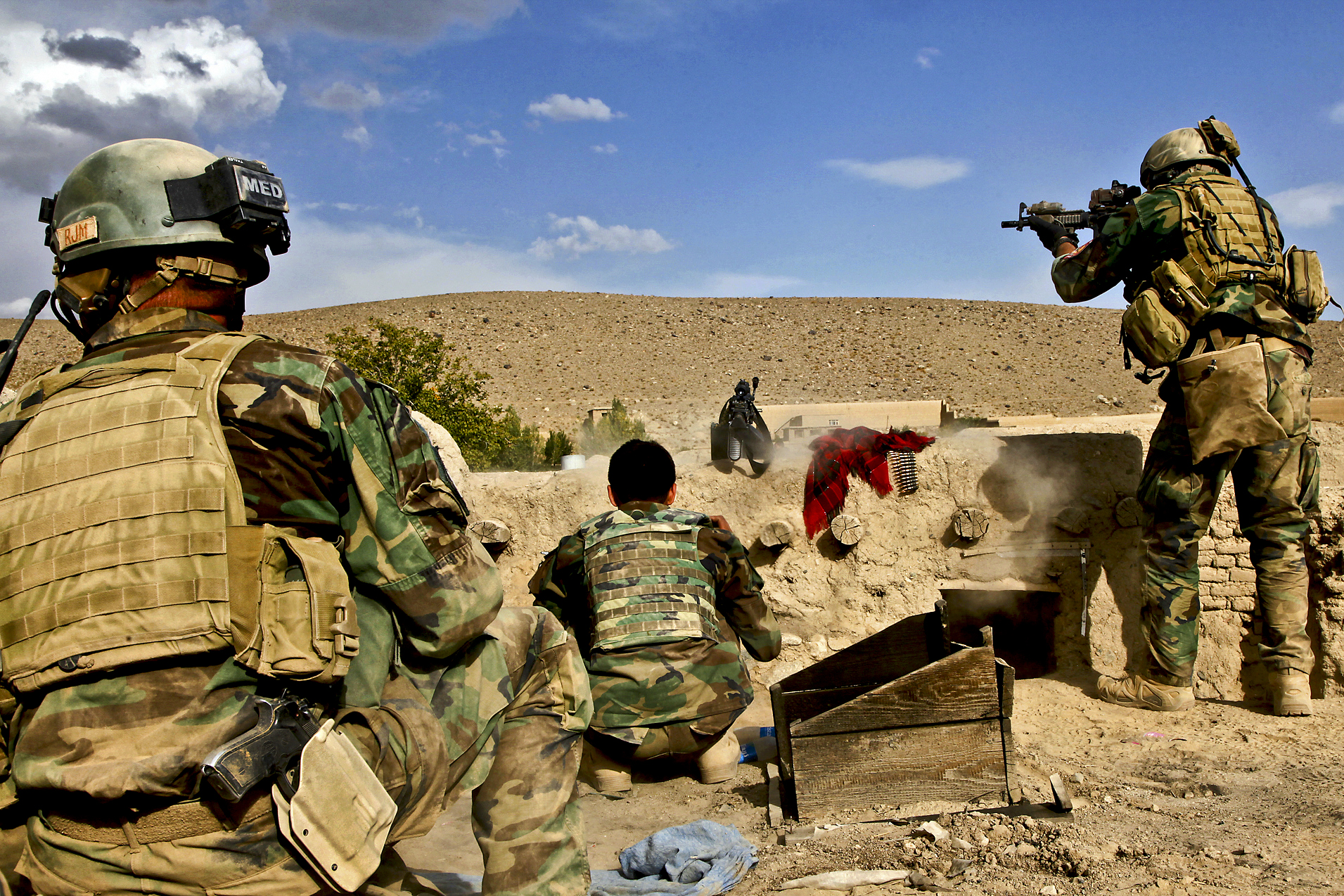
US Army Green Berets firing on an insurgent sniper position during a joint patrol with Afghan commandos of the 6th Commando Kandak in Wardak Province, October 9, 2011.

In early 2010, Brigadier General Scott Miller took command of CJSOTF-Afghanistan and assigned virtually all SOF in the theatre to a new counterinsurgency role that would become known as the ALP/VSO Program (Afghan Local Police/Village Stability Operations), the SOF in Afghanistan were organised into battalion level SOTF (Special Operations Task Forces) each with a geographic area of responsibility. 1st SFG would have responsibility for southwestern Afghanistan, other Green Berets would have responsibilities in southern and eastern Afghanistan; In March 2012, Green Beret ODA teams suffered several casualties to Green on Blue attacks.

On 13 September 2011 an ODA team from 1st Battalion 10th SFG, partnered with Hungarian Special Operations and Afghan National Police, carried out an operation to apprehend known insurgents in Maiden Shahr District, Wardak Province – an area traditionally used by insurgents to move undetected by opposing coalition forces. The main body of the force patrolled through a village from the north-east, whilst the ODA's team sergeant, MSG Danial Adams, led a small element, which convoyed through the mountainous area on the outskirts of a village via ATVs to provide necessary over watch and to facilitate radio communications from the high ground to the west. After approximately three hours of searching, they were unable to locate their target, so they began to withdraw from the village; it was at that time that they lost their aerial reconnaissance assets, which were pulled away to assist coalition forces in other parts of the country. Once the main body was clear of the village, Adams and the rest of his over-watch element began moving south on their ATVs to the designated link-up point. Adams led the way, followed by SFC Richard Harris and three other team members. Just as they passed a small cluster of buildings at the edge of the village, they ran into a well-planned and emplaced ambush consisting of more than 25 insurgents armed with AK-47's, light machine guns, PKM heavy machine guns, and RPG-7 rocket-propelled grenades. The insurgents were in staggered positions along the ambush line across approximately 180 meters. MSG Danial Adams was killed during the initial moments of the ambush whilst attempting to accelerate through the kill zone with his team, SFC Richard Harris spent the rest of the battle aggressively attacking the insurgents whilst guarding the body of his team sergeant at significant risk to his own life; reinforcements were brought into the battle and F-16 strafing runs were carried out, after the dropping of a 500lb bomb, the combined force left the battle. For his actions during the battle, Harris was eventually awarded the Silver Star.

==== Operation Freedom's Sentinel ====
Following the withdrawal of U.S. troops from Afghanistan at the end of 2014, the War in Afghanistan continued with 12,000 U.S. and NATO troops are deployed in Afghanistan as part of NATOs Resolute Support Mission whose purpose is to train, advise and assist Afghan government forces against anti-government forces and to conduct counter-terrorist missions. US forces in Afghanistan are deployed under Operation Freedom's Sentinel.

The Green Berets took part in the Battle of Kunduz, helping Afghan forces retake the city by October 2015 after it fell to Taliban insurgents.

Green Berets have also been assisting Afghan forces in Helmand Province, where on the January 5, 2016, during a major operation aimed at reclaiming territory held by the Taliban, Staff Seargent Matthew McClintock of A Company, 1st Battalion, 19th SFG was killed by small arms fire during an hours long battle in the Marjah district. Two other U.S. troops and four Afghan soldiers were injured. The coalition conducted 12 airstrikes in the area with a variety of aircraft, including F-16 fighter jets and an AC-130 gunship. Two HH-60 Pave Hawk medevac helicopters responded to evacuate casualties, one was waved off and left the scene safely, but the second landed and its main rotor blade was damaged when the helicopter hit a wall.

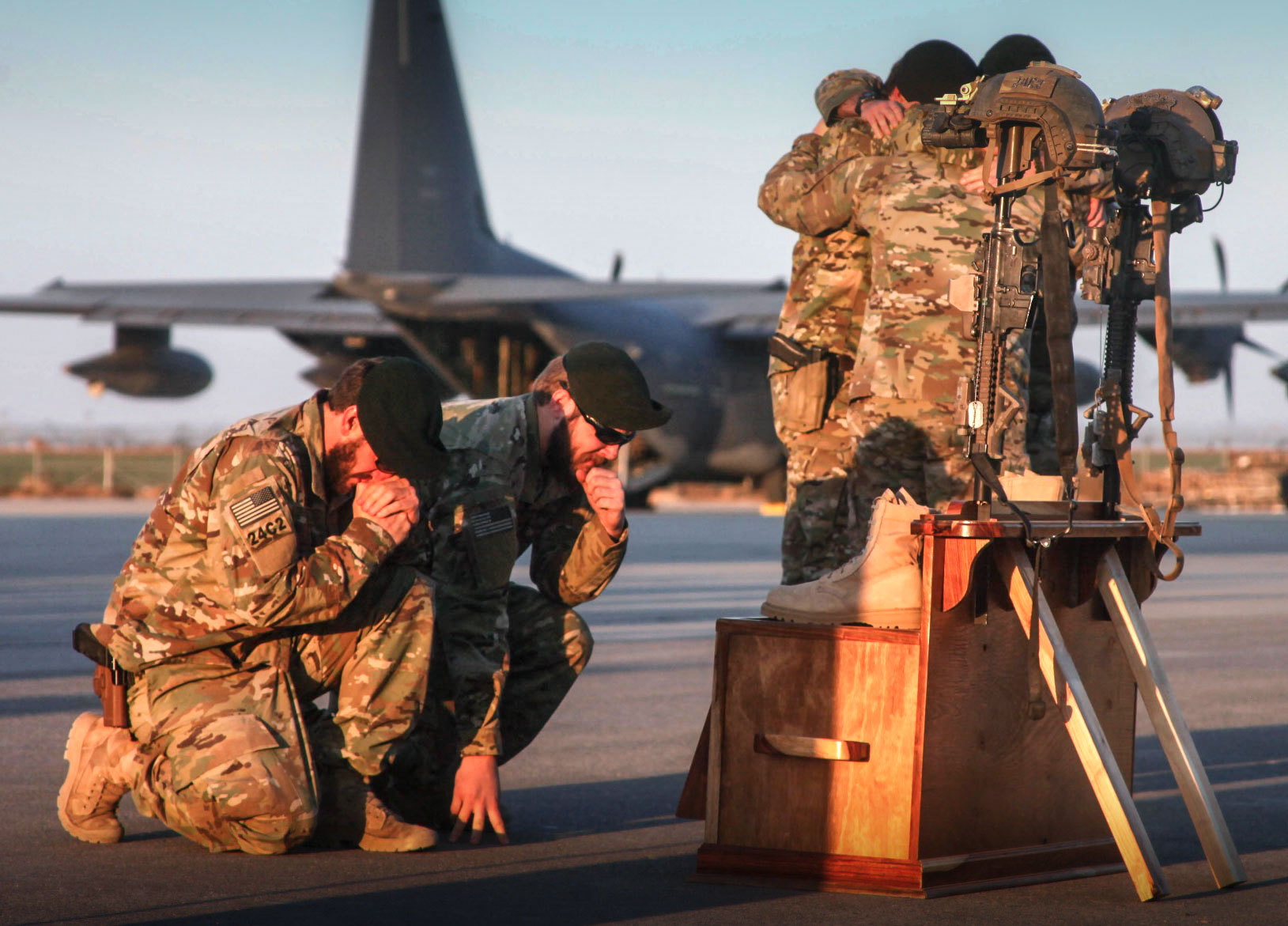
Green Berets of the 10th SFG memorialize two comrades who were killed in action during the Battle of Boz Qandahari on November 2–3, 2016, during a memorial held at Kunduz Airfield in Afghanistan on November 7, 2016.

On May 26, 2016, Green Berets supported about 80 soldiers of the Afghan 3rd Special Operations Battalion whose mission was to clear insurgents from Elbak, Kandahar province. The goal was to clear the road from Kandahar through Elbak to Tarin Kowt and allow an 800-man Afghan army convoy to deliver troops and supplies to Tarin Kowt. Green Berets called in three airstrikes by U.S. drones on Taliban insurgents near the landing zone, killing seven and wounding others. The mission had mixed results. The Taliban reoccupied the area and the convoy barely made any progress, however the operation interrupted the Taliban's nightly routine of bomb-planting. A week later, the Afghan commandos removed 18 booby-trap bombs from the road and made their way slowly through Elbak and further north. On August 23, a US soldier from A Company, 3rd battalion, 1st SFG, was killed by an IED while another was wounded along with six Afghans during a foot patrol near Lashkar Gah, Helmand Province.

On October 4, 2016, a US soldier from B Company, 2nd Battalion, 10th SFG was killed by a roadside bomb blast in Achin, Nangarhar province. He was on a patrol with Afghan forces during an operation against ISIL-KP militants. This marked the first time a U.S. serviceman was killed in combat against IS militants in the country. On October 17, DEA agents, supported by a US Army Green Beret A-team and Afghan counter-narcotic units conducted a warranted search in a remote village in Farah province. After a brief gunfight with insurgents near the compound outside the remote village, they discovered a "superlab" belonging to the Hadimama drug trafficking network that was led by two suspected Taliban commanders and facilitators. The team seized 20 tonnes (20 long tons; 22 short tons) of drugs (12.5 tons of morphine base, 6.4 tons of heroin base, 134 kilograms of opium, 129 kilograms of crystal heroin and 12 kilograms of hashish). They also seized nine motorcycles and five AK-47 rifles. It was reported that the superlab was apparently a first of its kind seen by DEA agents in Afghanistan. Officials said it was the "largest known seizure of heroin in Afghanistan, if not the world."

In the early hours of November 3, 2016, a joint raid with Afghan and NATO troops that targeted top Taliban commanders took place in Kunduz Province. After they were surrounded and came under enemy fire, the Afghans requested foreign airstrikes – despite Afghan forces providing initial air support, U.S. aircraft carried out the airstrikes. Two Green Berets from 2nd Battalion, 10th SFG were killed and 4 others wounded and 4 Afghan special forces troops were also killed and 7 were wounded. A Kunduz provincial police spokesman said that as of Friday morning (November 4), there were 24 civilian fatalities, including women and children, as many as 10 others were injured during the operation, which occurred in the village of Buze Kandahari, a Taliban-dominated area. A Kunduz police chief said the two senior Taliban commanders who were the target of the raid were killed in the fighting along with 63 other insurgents.

=== Operation Enduring Freedom – Philippines ===
OEF-P was established in 2002 to conduct what SOCOM history terms "full spectrum embedding and engagement"-focusing on long-term partnered operations with Philippine police and Army special operations and intelligence units as well as local units with the necessary skills to counter ASG and JI. Much of this work has fallen to 1st SFG.

SOCPAC deployed a Joint Task Force-510 (JTF-510) to Zamboanga City on Mindanao, Philippines in January 2002 to prepare for the introduction of forces onto Basilan. From February to July 2002, 10 ODAs and 3 ODBs (Operational Detachment Bravos) of 1st SFG provided training, advice, and assistance to 15 Armed Forces of the Philippines (AFP) Infantry Battalions. Their mission on Basilan was to work through, with, and by AFP units to destroy the ASG organization on the island. The ODAs were prohibited from conducting combat operations and performing advisory tasks below the battalion level, the ODAs focused on denying ASG sanctuary by preparing the AFP to improve security operations by controlling lines of communication, improving the infrastructure for the local populace through Civil Affairs, and bolstering the government in the eyes of citizens through information operations. After completing operations by late summer 2002, JTF-510 departed Zamboanga. On 2 October 2002, a bombing at an open-air market outside the gate of Camp Enrile Malagutay in Zamboanga City killed a U.S. Special Forces soldier from A Company, 2nd Battalion, 1st SFG.

In 2003–04, SOCPAC supported the AFP by training a larger number of Filipino forces. Again, 1st SFG deployed two successive force packages, consisting of one ODB and 5 ODAs, to conduct Security Assistance during 2003, and a third force package in 2004 of one ODB and 3 ODAs. In total the ODAs trained 5 AFP army and one AFP marine battalions. During the same period, 1st Battalion of 1st SFG continued training the Filipino Counterterrorist force, preparing and outfitting an additional two Light Reaction Companies (LRCs). ODAs from 1st Battalion of 1st SFG also assisted in the design of a Joint Special Operations Group (JSOG), including AFP air force rotary wing lift assets. On 30 June 2004, a U.S. Special Forces soldier from 2nd Battalion, 1st SFG, was killed in a non-hostile incident in Manila.

SOCPAC also introduced Operations/Intelligence Fusion Teams (O/IFTs) to work with various organizations in AFP's Southern Command. The O/IFTs provided advice and assistance on collection priorities and force employment at division and brigade. Beginning in 2004, 1st Battalion 1st SFG provided two ODAs continuously to serve as O/IFTs, both to the newly created JSOG and to Filipino 6th Infantry Division in Mindanao.

In the summer of 2005, terrorists from the ASG and JI had moved from Mindanao to Sulu where they sought refuge. SOCPAC and Southern Command pushed for a significant expansion of American assistance to the Filipino Counterterrorist effort, but being that Sulu was predominantly inhabited by Muslims and was the site where Islam was introduced to the Philippines, many members of both the Philippine and US governments believed that introducing American forces onto Sulu would have been met with intense resistance. Based on a PACOM assessment recommending such a deployment, the Secretary of Defense approved a second iteration of OEF-P to combat terrorism in the Southern Command Area of Responsibility, specifically on Sulu. SOCPAC established a larger JSOTF in Zamboanga and deployed aforce package to the island of Sulu, conducting operations based on the Basilan model. Using that template, SOCPAC deployed one ODB, 5 ODAs to Sulu to advise and assist AFP units in their effort to capture key terrorists. From October 2005 to July 2006, JSOTF-P units assisted Task Force (TF) Comet-the AFP command on Sulu-in setting conditions to deny terrorist sanctuary. ODAs advised their partner army and marine infantry battalions en route and area security to facilitate Filipino sponsored medical, veterinary, and engineer civilian action programs, along with various population engagement activities. These combined efforts succeeded in separating the terrorists from the population.

On 27 October 2007, a U.S. Special Forces soldier from 2nd Battalion, 1st SFG was killed in an accidental drowning incident at Lake Seit in the southern Philippines.

On 29 September 2009, a roadside bomb killed two U.S. Special Forces soldiers from 3rd battalion, 1st SFG and a Philippine Marine on Jolo island.

=== Operation Enduring Freedom – Horn of Africa ===
During December 2002 and January 2003, Special Operation Detachment – Central (SOD-C) arrived to augment Joint Special Operations Task Force – Horn of Africa (JSOTF-HOA). The SOD concept was new and consisted of experienced National Guard Special Forces Officers and NCOs who served as the JSOTF's core staff. Besides the SOD-C, JSOTF-HOA included Air Force Special Operations Detachment-Alpha (AFSOD-A), an SF detachment, a SEAL platoon, and a Naval Special Warfare (NSW) rigid inflatable boat (RIB) detachment.

In November 2006, 20th SFG Headquarters deployed to round out the Special Operations Command and Control Element – Horn of Africa (SOCCE-HOA) staff for two years. This initiative allowed SOCCE-HOA to better accomplish its missions.

American Special Forces carried out operations in support of Ethiopian troops during the invasion of Somalia in December 2006 aimed at toppling the Islamic Courts Union.

=== Iraq War ===
==== Invasion of Iraq ====
Planning for the Operation Iraqi Freedom began in December 2001; in 2002 several teams of 10th SFG and CIA SAD operatives were infiltrated into Iraqi Kurdistan in advance of hostilities. They were based in the Harir valley outside Irbil and tasked to develop ground truth intelligence while organising and training the Peshmerga; they were also there to monitor Ansar al-Islam and plan for a future operation against them.

For the 2003 invasion of Iraq, CJSOTF-West (Combined Joint Special Operations Task Force-West/Task Force Dagger) was formed around the 5th SFG, their ODAs were tasked with two core missions: the first – to counter the SCUD TELs and by denying the Iraqi military the use of potential launch sites and the second – provide both intelligence-gathering and screening function in support of conventional forces to build up an accurate picture of Iraqi force dispositions in western Iraq. The Green Beret ODAs were deployed under the command and control of ODBs (Operational Detachment Bravo) which operated as roving AOBs (Advanced Operating Bases), these AOBs provided a mobile resupply function using their modified M1078 Light Medium Transport Vehicles which meant that the ODA patrols could operate for extended periods in enemy territory before linking up with a fighting patrol that would be escorting the AOBs for combat resupply. The 5th SFG was assigned responsibility for two sectors of western Iraq-the western and southern JSOAs (Joint Special Operations Areas-also known as Ops Boxes), one element termed FOB 51 (Operating Base 51) and commanded by AOB 520 and AOB 530, was composed of ODAs from 1st Battalion 5th SFG, they were stationed out of H-5 Air Base and were responsible for western Iraq. 2nd and 3rd Battalions deployed from Ali Al Salem Air Base as FOB 52 and 53 and were assigned to southern Iraq; attached to all teams were Special Tactics airmen from the 23rd Special Tactics Squadron to guide in close air support and manage the airspace above the ODA teams. A company element from the 19th SFG was attached to TF Dagger as were several regular and National Guard infantry companies to provide FOB security and to act as a QRF. As the prospect of war grew A company, 1st Battalion, 19th SFG, were tasked with liaison roles supporting conventional forces: ODA 911 and ODA 913 were to support the I MEF; ODA 914 was divided into two elements, one supporting the 3rd Infantry Division with ODA 916 and the other supporting British Forces; ODA 915 was attached to the 101st Airborne Division; and ODA 912 was tasked with providing PSD for General Harrell, the commander of CFSOCC (Combined Forces Special Operations Component Command). Responsibility for special operations in northern Iraq was assigned to CJSOTF-North (Combined Joint Special Operations Task Force-North/Task Force Viking) was formed around the 10th SFG, working alongside them would 3rd Battalion 3rd SFG. They were supported by the 123rd Special Tactics Squadron, 173rd Airborne Brigade and several companies of 2nd Battalion, 14th Infantry Regiment, 10th Mountain Division. The original plan called for TF Viking to support the 4th Infantry Division advance from Turkey towards Baghdad but the mission was cancelled when Turkey denied staging rights to the US. Viking was assigned the task of keeping 13 Iraqi armoured and infantry divisions in the north from reinforcing Baghdad, the 10th SFG was to organise the Kurdish Peshmerga to support them.

Just as in Afghanistan, SF were the first military units in Iraq after the initial entry of JSOC (Joint Special Operations Command) and the CIA. At H-Hour, Bravo and Charlie companies of 1st Battalion, 5th SFG, crossed the Kuwait border began carrying out operations in western Iraq – joining up with the British and Australian SAS and Delta Force elements to secure H-3 Air Base, as well as securing Ar Rutbah; the 5th SFG also carried out operations in support of forces moving on Karbala Nasiriyah and Al Diwaniyah. On 21 March, ODA 554 of Charlie Company, 2nd Battalion 5th SFG entered Iraq and began carrying out operations in southern Iraq – mainly supporting British forces in the seizure of Basra and surrounding locations, until relieved by G squadron, 22 SAS Regiment. Bravo company carried out reconnaissance operations around Najaf On March 22, 2003, after a number of delays, the majority of 2nd and 3rd battalions, 10th SFG, were airlifted into northern Iraq, with the rest arriving the following day, marking the beginning of operations in northern Iraq – On March 28, 3rd Battalion, 10th SFG, with Kurdish Peshmerga elements, took part in Operation Viking Hammer against the terrorist group Ansar al-Islam, killing 300 terrorists-largely and discovering evidence of al-Qaeda trying to produce chemical weapons. On 6 April 2003, ODA 391 and ODA 392 from the 3rd SFG and ODA 044 from 10th SFG with about 150 Kurdish fighters were the main force involved in the Battle of Debecka Pass, whilst other ODAs 051, 055, 056 and other ODAs from both groups with Kurdish forces took the town of Ayn Sifni – opening the road to Mosul. On 9 April, nine ODAs from FOB 103 encircled Kirkuk after fierce fighting to capture the ridges overlooking the approaches to the city, the earlier capture of the nearby city of Tuz had largely broken the will of the Iraqi Army and only the Fedayeen remained in Kirkuk, a week later the 173rd Airborne took over responsibility for the city and secured it. After several days of heavy airstrikes, FOB 102 and their Peshmerga allies took Mosul unopposed and were relieved by 3rd Battalion, 3rd SFG, conventional Army and Marine forces. Along with CIA/SAD officers, the Green Berets led one of the most successful campaigns in Iraq, particularly the 10th SFG along with its Kurdish allies defeated six Iraqi Army Divisions with limited air support and no SF soldiers were killed. The joint Kurdish-Special Forces units killed over one-thousand Iraqi Army soldiers and captured hundreds more.

==== Post-invasion ====
In May 2003, CJSOTF-AP (Combined Joint Special Operations Task Force-Arabian Peninsula) was established to replace Task Forces Dagger, Viking and the Naval Special Operations Task Group that had commanded the SOF in the invasion. Since 2003, CJSOTF-AP was based around the 5th SFG and 10th SFG which deployed for 7-month rotations, much of CJSOTF-AP was focused on the core special forces skill set of training and advising local Iraqi forces, these units included the ICTF (Iraqi Counterrorism Force) and the ISOF. When foreign fighters and al-Qaeda terrorists began to filter into the country from Syria and Iran, the Iraqi police was fragmented and poorly supported were to be the frontline against the insurgency, police training was carried out by contractors whilst ODAs were paired with local Iraqi SWAT units to teach them tactical skills. Other Iraqi SOF were established with the assistance of the Green Berets including a SOCOM-style command. The 1st ISOF Brigade would eventually be formed to command the ICTF, 36th Commando Battalion, Reece Battalion, Iraqi Special Warfare School and a support battalion. Similarly, an Iraqi Police special operations command and the Emergency Response Brigade was raised from local Iraqi police SWAT elements, consisting of six SWAT battalions.

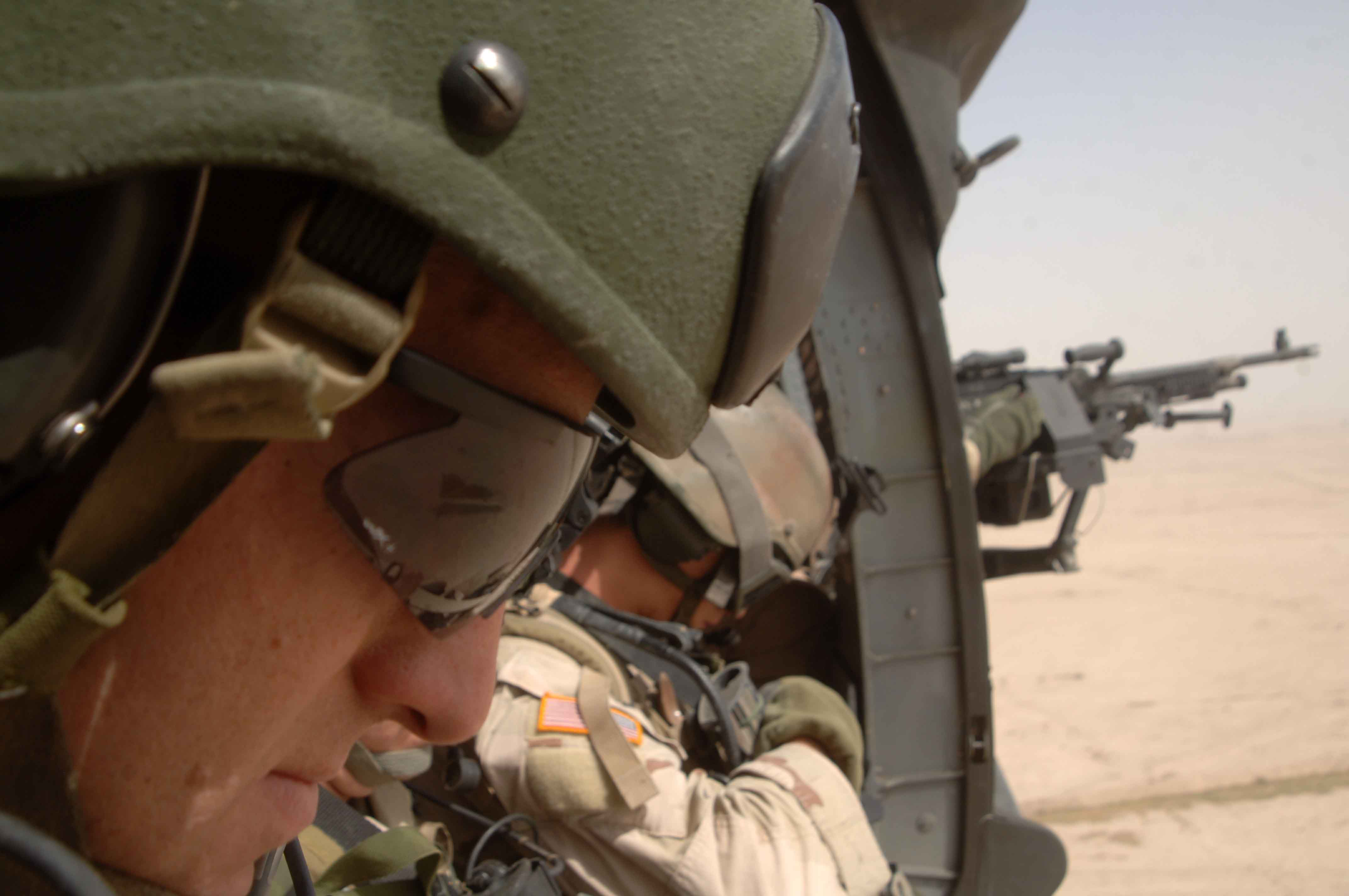
Special Forces along with Iraqi Army forces conduct an air assault in-route to their mission objective to capture terrorists of a known insurgent force, September 2007.

In 2004, prior to the Second Battle of Fallujah, the 5th SFG with JSOC elements, SEALs and Marine Force Recon were heavily involved in shaping operations prior to the November 7 D-DAY when coalition forces entered the city. The SOF shaping included sophisticated feints to mislead the insurgents as to the direction of the final assault, close target reconnaissance and direct-action missions where a logistics node or IED factory was targeted. In addition, Green Berets from the 5th SFG and Delta Force operators were deployed in small teams (most consisting of just three or four operators), to embed with Marine and Army infantry units. These teams followed the earlier model established during the First Battle of Fallujah – by providing advanced communications, sniping and assault experience and mentoring the soldiers and Marines fighting house to house through the city. The ICTF was under CJSOTF-AP command until 2006 when it was handed over to the Iraqis under the newly established CTS (Iraqi Counterrorism Service).

In the years after the invasion, the Green berets mentored the elite units in the Iraqi Army. Following George W. Bush sanctioning a new directive in November 2006, to allow US forces in Iraq to kill or capture Iranian nationals if they engaged in targeting coalition forces, US commanders formed Task Force 17, based around a Green Berets headquarters group, whose missions were called CII (Counter Iranian Influence); and Green Beret ODA's were selected to be part of it. The Green Berets would become actively involved against the Iranian-backed Special Groups, TF-17 relied a good deal on the Green Berets mentoring teams with the ISOF, the Green Berets placed ODA's in outfits such as the INIS and the Iraqi commando brigade. The ODA's consisted of 20 men and became — during the course of 2007 — the key to coalition operations in provinces such as Dhi Ghar or Maysan, the teams ensured that operations in the Shia militant strongholds had an Iraqi face to them — something of great symbolic importance to the US relationship with the Iraqi government. Green Berets and Polish GROM conducted Operation Jackal against insurgents in Diwaniyah in 2007. During May and June 2007, many Shia arrest operations were conducted by the British SAS and TF-17s Green Berets and Iraqi commandos led to Muqtada al-Sadr to initially flee to Iran, and in August he declared a Mahdi Army ceasefire with the coalition.

=== Insurgency in the Maghreb and Sahel ===
Green Berets have been deployed throughout the Sahara/Sahel region and western Africa, particularly on FID missions.

==== Pan Sahel Initiative ====
In 2002, the United States created the Pan Sahel Initiative (PSI) which was aimed at counter-terrorism and enhancing regional peace and security in Mali, Mauritania, Niger and Chad. Green Berets from the 10th SFG attached to Special Operations Command Europe (SOCEUR) of the United States European Command (EUCOM) deployed to Niger and Mali and supervised anti-terror exercises in the Sahara Desert.

==== Operation Enduring Freedom – Trans Sahara ====
In June 2005, the United States replaced the PSI with the launch of the Trans-Saharan Counterterrorism Initiative (TSCTI/TSCTP) for Burkina Faso, Mali, Niger, Chad, Mauritania, Morocco, Algeria, Tunisia, Senegal and Nigeria, with the support from the Department of Defense's Operation Enduring Freedom – Trans Sahara (OEF-TS).

The principle SOF unit for the TSCTP/TSCTI was the 10th SFG, which was joined by the 20th SFG, as the 3rd SFG (who had regional responsibility for Africa) was assigned to Iraq. This meant the Green Berets in the region lacked the cultural and language prerequisites that the 3rd SFG had, and so the Green Berets were forced into a mission that they, like the targeted countries were "learning on the job".

In 2005 and 2007, US Army Special Forces and US Army Rangers, along with contingents from other units participated in the JCET's Flintlock Exercises, where they provided training experience both for American troops and for troops of African countries. Small numbers of European troops were also involved in these exercises. The first test of the TSCTI, which "kicked off" the Saharan counterterrorism initiative was Flintlock 2005, lasted from 6–26 June 2005, and was designated by the Bush administration as the largest American military exercise in Africa since World War II. 700 special forces participants, supported by an additional 2,100 troops from 9 North and West African states. The opening phase provided a terrorist scenario in order to train 3,000 ill-equipped Saharan troops in counterterrorist techniques designed to share intelligence, prevent terrorist interdiction, and protect/patrol the borders.

In April 2007, Green Berets went to Niger for the first part of Flintlock 2007; The TSCTP also involved smaller, regular training exercises conducted by US Army Special Forces personnel throughout the region.

==== Operation Juniper Shield ====
At some point in 2013, Operation Enduring Freedom – Trans Sahara was rebadged as Operation Juniper Shield.

ABC News reported that the Green Berets are also advising and assisting Niger's military to build up their fighting capability to counter the terrorist groups like al-Qaeda and ISIS. In September 2014, the Huffington post reported that members of the 19th SFG were deployed to Camp Ram Ram in Morocco as part of Operation Juniper Shield.

On July 1, 2015, Army Times reported that the 3rd SFG will begin shifting its area of operations to Africa, with its focus primarily on northern and western Africa, the group expects to complete its transition out of the Middle East and Central Asia by summer 2016, as the wars in Iraq and Afghanistan wind down. Colonel Robert Wilson, the group commander, said his group "will gradually replace 10th [SFG] mission on the continent."

On February 2, 2017, during a “routine administrative movement,” a Green Beret from 1st Battalion, 3rd SFG was killed and another soldier injured in a vehicle accident in Niger; according to the Stars and Stripes report Niger is a hub for special operations forces to train partner nations in north and west Africa to counter extremist groups and militants such as Boko Haram in Nigeria. On October 4, 2017, Green Berets of the 3rd SFG were ambushed. Time reported that a joint team of 12 Green Berets and 30 Nigerien troops were conducting a two-day reconnaissance mission along the Niger-Mali border. The target of their operation was Ibrahim Dondou Chefou, who had attended a high-level meeting of regional leaders from the Islamic State in the Greater Sahara (ISGS) days earlier. After searching a deserted campsite and speaking with elders from the village of Tongo Tongo, seeking intelligence on the terrorist operative, they began a 110 miles (180 km) drive back to base. Travelling in mostly unarmored pick-up trucks, they were ambushed by around 50 ISGS terrorists. During the engagement, four Green Berets were killed and two were wounded, and five Nigeriens were killed and eight wounded. Twenty-one terrorists were killed.

=== Operation Inherent Resolve ===
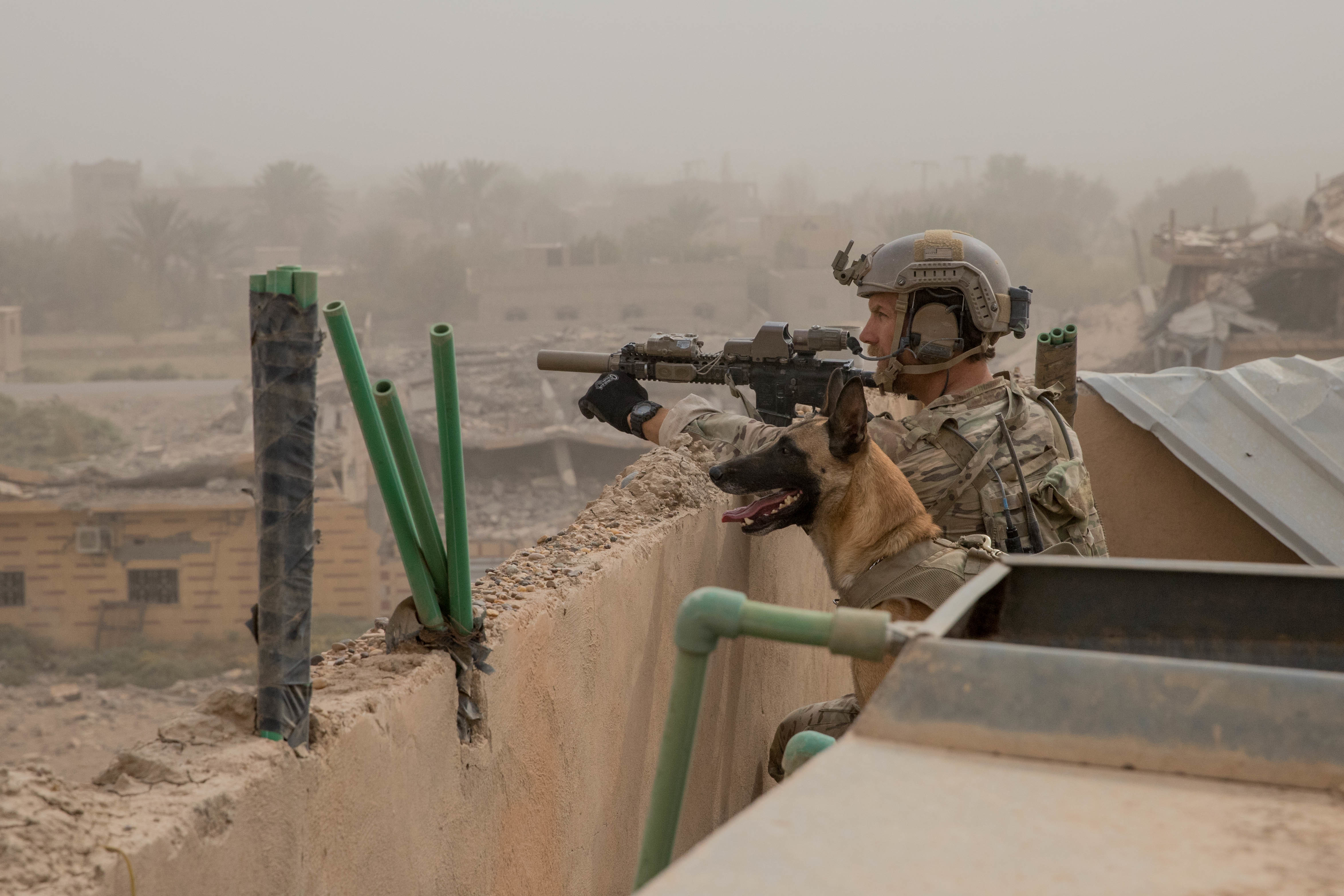
A Special Forces operator in Syria wearing a FAST helmet with MultiCam clothing and armed with a modified M4A1 carbine alongside a SF Multi-Purpose Canine provides security for a nearby mortar position during the Deir ez-Zor campaign, October 11, 2018

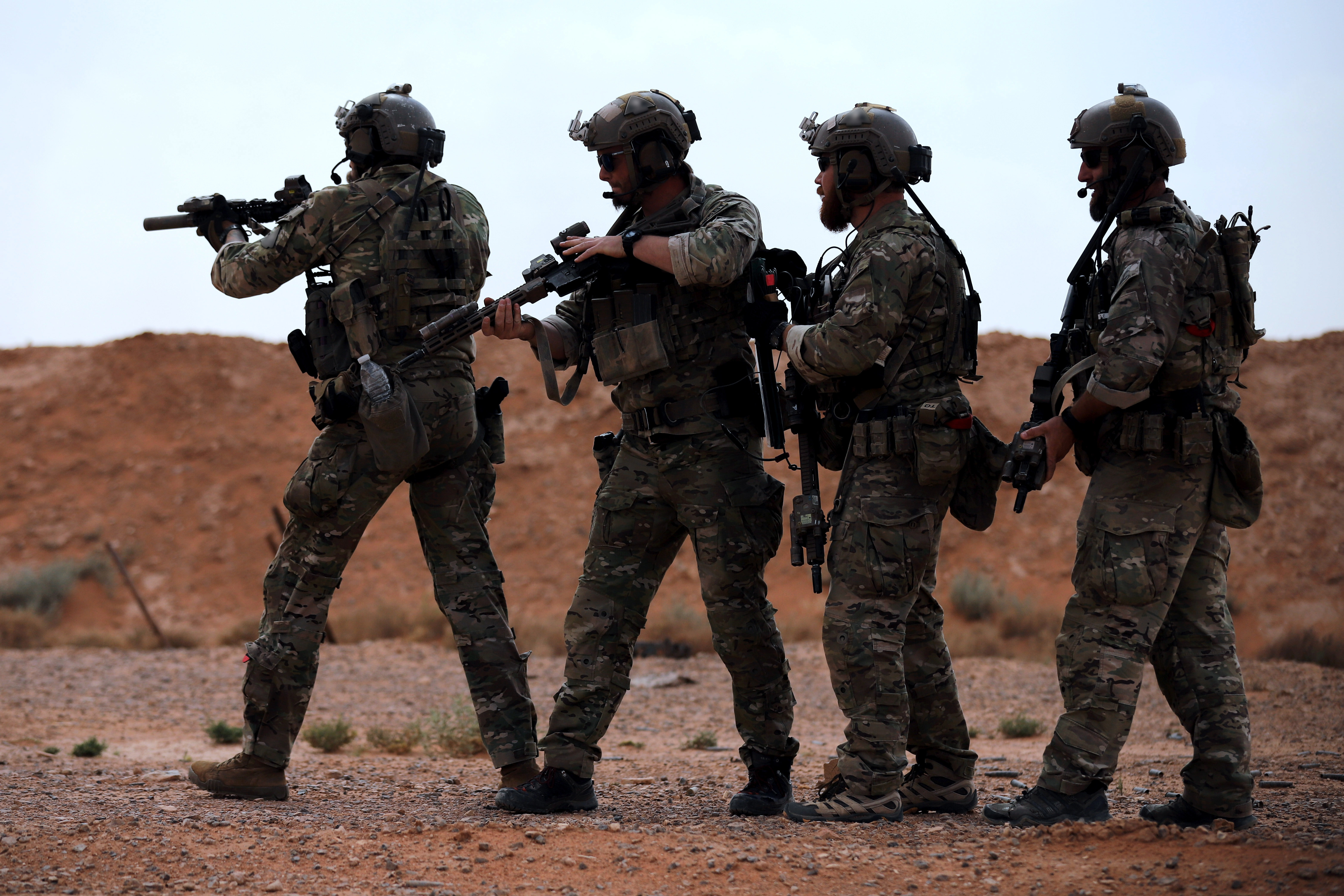
4 Green Berets armed with modified M4A1 carbines during CQC training near al-Tanf, Syria April 25 2020

Since Operation Inherent Resolve began, U.S. airstrikes have been supported by Green Beret adviser teams, helping stop the advances of ISIL. Green Berets from the 5th SFG deployed to Jordan in support of OIR. On November 4, 2016, a small convoy carrying Green Berets was returning to the base after a training exercise when a Jordanian guard, after waving the first vehicle through the entry control point at the base, then opened fire on the second vehicle killing 2 Green Berets, U.S. troops from the vehicle behind opened fire, another Green Beret was killed but a fourth, who was wounded, shot the Jordanian, severely wounding him.

== Lord's Resistance Army insurgency ==
The United States had been involved clandestinely in the Lord's Resistance Army insurgency since at least 2008; President Barack Obama deployed forces here in October 2011, the deployment is known as Operation Observant Compass. In March 2017, NBC News reported that Green Berets have been ordered to "apprehend or remove" Joseph Kony, one of the world's most notorious warlords from the battlefield, along with his top commanders. With about 80 military personnel and several dozen support personnel they were tasked with finding around 150 LRA fighters in an area of operations the size of California; carrying out missions (specifically patrols) in the Central African Republic, Democratic Republic of the Congo, South Sudan and Uganda. The cooperation between U.S. special forces and the UPDF has led to notable successes: In January 2015, Green Berets were present after Dominic Ongwen turned himself in to authorities; previously in October 2012, an Invisible Children, Inc. program that encourages defections from the group and the rehabilitation of former fighters and escaped abductees resulted in notable defections, including several bodyguards; the LRA's "chief intelligence officer" who walked for four days from Sudan into CAR, was handed over to the UPDF with U.S. special forces present.

LtCol Matt Maybouer, the commander of the operation said that "U.S. soldiers are not engaged in direct combat;" Green Beret teams conducting patrols carryout zone reconnaissance: a coordinated search for recent LRA activity. When they find it, the teams follow the trails, tracking the fighters for days across miles of uninhabited wilderness until they make contact. Matching these generic terrain-feature descriptions to specific GPS markers enabled SOCAFRICA to build a map of the area. The results enable the Green Berets to anticipate LRA movements. Commanders have used this knowledge to carry out operations that have sharply reduced the remnants of the LRA.

== Operation Atlantic Resolve ==
On 29 March 2017, the Department of Defense reported that Green Berets from 1st Battalion 10th SFG were deployed to Europe to take part in exercise Allied Spirit VI-a multinational training exercise involving military personnel from Canada, Czech Republic, Estonia, Finland, France, Hungary, Germany, Italy, Macedonia, Kosovo, Latvia, the Netherlands, Slovenia, UK and US at the JMRC in Germany, the exercise involved special operations and conventional forces with the aim to increase their effectiveness and/particularly to increase the effectiveness of special operations forces in working together while bolstering the capabilities of partner nations within US European Command's area of responsibility. The Green Berets provided their advise and assist training/skills, whilst working with Estonian Special Operations Task Group troops and Macedonian special operations troops. US Army Major Robert Temple, the special operations force cell planner at the JMRC said that “The primary purpose of this exercise is providing a venue for the 1st Latvian Brigade to train in a Joint Task Force environment and increase their interoperability with both U.S. units as well as other multinational forces.” The exercise is being conducted as part of Operation Atlantic Resolve.

== Women in the Green Berets ==
In 1981 Capt. Kathleen Wilder became the first woman to qualify for the Green Berets. She was told she had failed a field exercise just before graduation, but she filed a sex discrimination complaint, and it was determined that she "had been wrongly denied graduation." In 2020 the first woman actually joined the Green Berets.
