= Battle of Bessang Pass =

1945 battle in the Philippines Campaign of World War II

- Part of the Philippines campaign (1944–1945) of the Pacific Theater of World War II
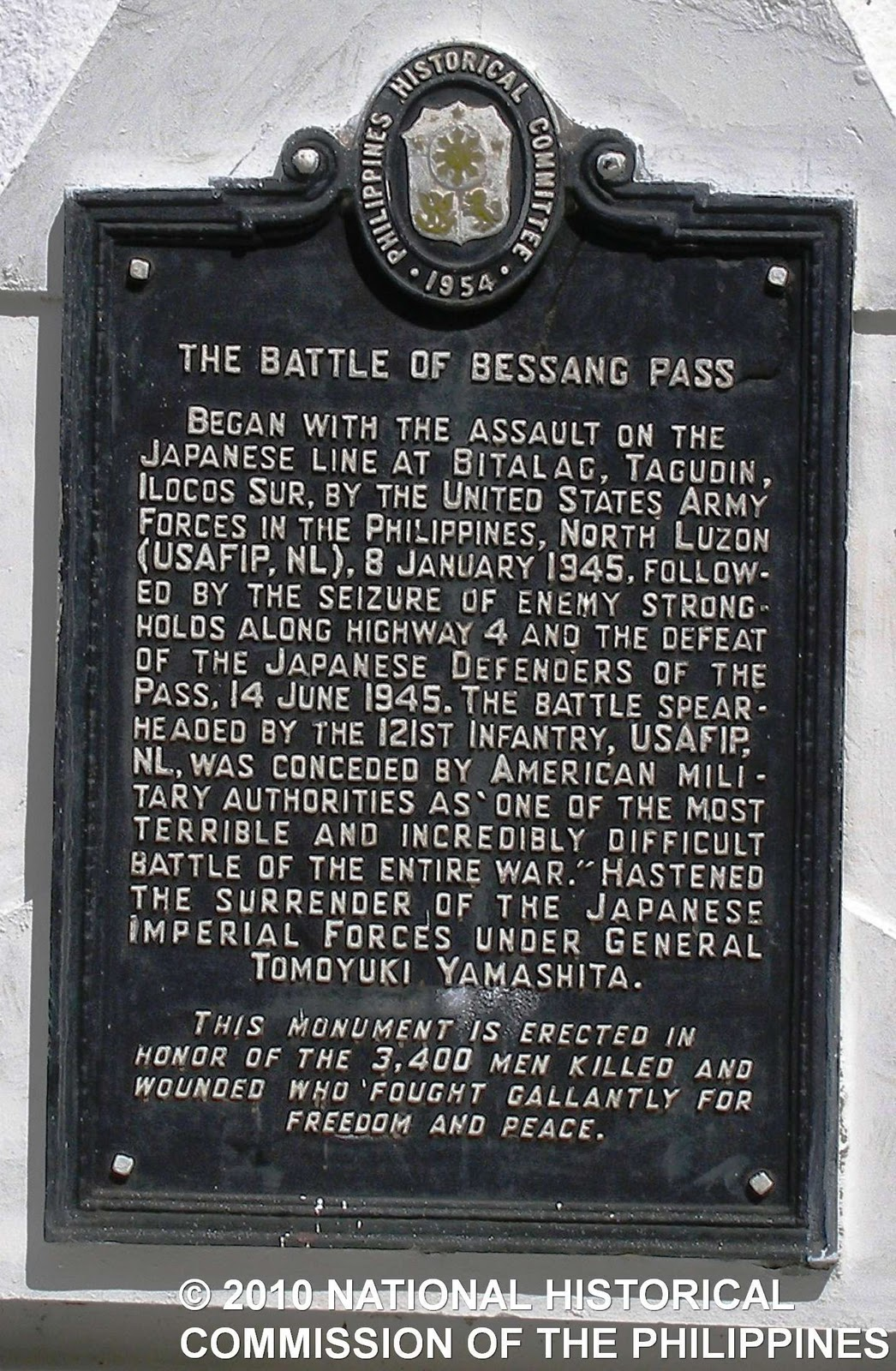
- Battle of Bessang Pass historical marker
Date	9 January – 15 June 1945
Location	Ilocos Sur, Luzon, Philippines
Result	Allied victory

Belligerents
United States: Commonwealth of the Philippines	Japan: Second Philippine Republic

Commanders and leaders
(United States) Russell W. Volckmann (Philippines) Calixto Duque	(Empire of Japan) Tomoyuki Yamashita (Empire of Japan) Yoshiharu Ozaki

Strength
United States Army Forces in the Philippines - Northern Luzon	73rd and 76th Infantry, Japanese 14th Area Army; ~ 2,250 Japanese troops

Casualties and losses
USAFIP-NL forces: 119 killed 220 wounded	IJA: 2,600 killed

The Battle of Bessang Pass (Filipino: Labanan sa Pasong Bessang; Ilocano: Gubat ti Paso Bessang) was a major battle during the Philippines Campaign of World War II. It was fought from 9 January through 15 June 1945, Cervantes, a municipality in the province of Ilocos Sur, located 382 kilometres (237 mi) north of Manila. The area serves as a gateway to the Cordillera mountains and the city of Baguio. Bessang Pass was a stronghold of the Japanese imperial forces under Gen. Tomoyuki Yamashita, known as the “Tiger of Malaya” and conqueror of Singapore. It was part of the triangular defense of General Yamashita in the north, namely the Balete Pass, Villaverde Trail, and Bessang Pass, guarding the Ifugao-Benguet-Vizcaya borders. Its fall at the hands of the United States Army Forces in the Philippines - Northern Luzon (USAFIP-NL) on June 14, 1945, paved the way for the entrapment of Yamashita’s forces in the Cordillera until the general’s surrender in September 1945.

== Campaign ==
The USAFIP(NL) was composed of five infantry regiments and a field artillery battalion of about 20,000 men, all Filipinos except for five American officers, and commanded by Col. Russell W. Volckmann. The troops bore the brunt of the fighting, sustaining over 3,375 casualties, including over 900 men killed, from 9 January through 15 June 1945.

The units of the USAFIP(NL) that fought at the battle were the 121st, 15th, 66th, the Provisional Battalion, and the 122nd Field Artillery. They faced the 73rd Infantry and the 76th Infantry, part of the 19th Division led by Lt. General Yoshiharu Ozaki. The Japanese forces fortified the hills and the ridges to stop any American offensive on the way to Cervantes and the Cordillera stronghold of Yamashita.

The initial fighting started in February 1945 with an advance inland to the town of Cervantes by the 121st Infantry. After liberating San Fernando, La Union, on 23 March, the USAFIP-NL forces started the all-out assault on Bessang Pass. However, on 17 May, the 73rd Infantry, 19th Division, made a strong counterattack, pushing back the 121st.

On 1 June, Volckmann started his renewed attack with three regiments abreast. They cleared the Lamagan and Lower Cadsu Ridges by 5 June. Magun Hill was captured by 10 June, and the Upper Cadsu Ridge was taken by 12 June. On 10 June, the units of 121st launched a final assault and by 14 June, the "last opposition melted away". Cervantes was secured by 15 June.

== Aftermath ==
The USAFIP(NL), according to Smith, "made a substantial contribution toward the Sixth Army's campaign in northern Luzon...the USAFIP (NL) had kept the 19th Division pinned to the triangle formed by Bontoc, KP 90, and Bessang Pass...seizing San Fernando and clearing Route 3 up the west coast, the USAFIP(NL) had permitted the Sixth Army to forget about plans to use a 'regular' division along the coast." Additionally, Smith said, "the USAFIP(NL) accomplished far more than GHQ SWPA, Sixth Army, or I Corps had apparently expected or hoped."

== See also ==
- Battle of Balete Pass
- Artemio Ricarte
