= Russell W. Volckmann =

American general

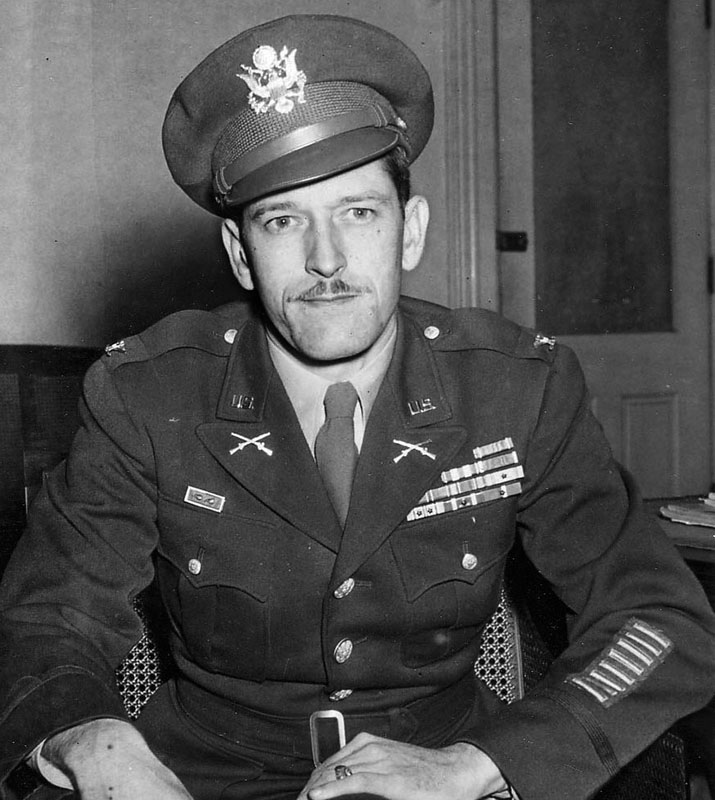
- Colonel Volckmann in c. 1946
- Born: October 23, 1911; Clinton, Iowa
- Died: June 30, 1982 (aged 70); Iowa City, Iowa
- Military career
- Allegiance: United States
- Branch: United States Army
- Service years: 1934–1957
- Rank: Brigadier General
- Conflicts: World War II: Philippines campaign; Battle of Bataan; Military and Guerrilla Warfare, Luzon; Korean War
- Awards: Distinguished Service Cross (2); Army Distinguished Service Medal; Silver Star; Legion of Merit; Bronze Star Medal (2); Army Commendation Medal

Russell William Volckmann (October 23, 1911 – June 30, 1982) was a United States Army infantry officer and a leader of the Philippine Commonwealth military and guerrilla resistance to the Japanese conquest of the Philippines during World War II. After the war, he remained in the United States Army and helped create the United States Army Special Forces. Volckmann, together with Colonels Aaron Bank and Wendell Fertig, are considered the founders of the United States Army Special Forces (the "Green Berets"). He eventually retired as a brigadier general.

== Early life and career ==
Russell Volckmann was born 23 October 1911, in Clinton, Iowa, to Hattie May (Dodds) and William J. C. Volckmann. He attended high school at Shattuck Military Academy, Fairbault, Minnesota.

In 1930, Volckmann entered the United States Military Academy at West Point, New York, and was commissioned a second lieutenant in the infantry upon graduation in June 1934. Although he asked for assignment to the Philippines, a choice duty station requested by many officers, his below average performance at West Point resulted in assignment elsewhere. Volckmann received orders to Fort Snelling, Minnesota, where he was a rifle platoon leader and later a company executive officer with the 3rd Infantry Division. In 1937, he received orders to attend the Infantry Officer Advanced Course at Fort Benning, Georgia. After completing this school, he served at Fort Sam Houston, Texas, as a company commander with the 2nd Infantry Division. In 1940, he finally received orders for duty in the Philippines.

In 1940, 29-year-old Captain Volckmann loaded himself, his wife Nancy and their young son aboard a ship for duty in the Philippines. Upon arrival, he became the commander of Company H, 31st Infantry Regiment. In July 1941, he was transferred to the 11th Infantry Regiment, 11th Infantry Division, Philippine Army, as the regimental executive officer. This was unusual duty for a company-grade officer, but political tensions in the Pacific resulted in accelerated expansion and training for the Philippine Commonwealth Army.

In August 1941, Volckmann's wife and son, along with all other U.S. military dependents, were sent back to the United States due to war concerns. On 8 December 1941, the Japanese attacked the Philippines.

== World War II ==
The 11th fought a delaying retreat from Lingayen Gulf to Bataan. At the fall of Bataan in 1942, Volckmann refused to surrender and, accompanied by Donald Blackburn, began a trek to northern Luzon before the fall of Corregidor. Sometimes in the company of other fleeing American and Filipino soldiers, Volckmann and Blackburn headed to the cordillera in Northern Luzon. Once there, they hoped to assist in establishing an organized resistance against the Japanese. Volckmann strongly credits the assistance of Filipino civilians in making their journey a success, especially during their periods of illness, and time recovering at the American Fassoth Camp. On 20 August 1942, they reached Colonel Thorp's camp west of Fort Stotsenburg in the Zambales Mountains. Thorp had been sent out from Bataan in January to organize guerrillas. On 24 August, they were guided to Hukbalahap headquarters on Mount Arayat, which then had them guided north to La Paz, Tarlac. They made their way north to Robert Lapham's camp, who then guided them further north to Charlie Cushing's camp, where Herb Swick joined them. On 9 September, they met Colonels Noble and Moses, Captain Parker Calvert, and Lieutenant Arthur P. Murphy in North Luzon.

Colonel Moses assumed command of guerrilla forces in North Luzon on 1 October 1942, and ordered coordinated attacks on Japanese forces starting on 15 October. Volckmann and Blackburn joined Lieutenant Rufino Baldwin, Philippine Army, in attacks on the Japanese garrisons in the Sanhiglo and Balatoc area. Volckmann then established a new camp in Kiangan, Ifugao on 8 December 1942. After being notified on 9 June 1943 of the capture of Colonels Moses and Noble, Volckmann took command of the two thousand man strong USAFIP-NL. His orders from Douglas MacArthur's South West Pacific Area, were to "...limit hostilities and contact with the enemy to the minimum...your present mission as intelligence units can be of utmost value".

On 24 November 1943, Volckmann organized his army into seven districts: 1st District under Major Parker Calvert, 2nd and 3rd Districts under Major George Barnett, 4th District under Major Ralph Praeger, 5th District under Major Romulo Manriquez, 6th District under Major Robert Lapham, and the 7th District under Volckmann and Blackburn. Volckmann's claim to command some of these units is questionable. For example, Robert Lapham rejected Volckmann's efforts to command his guerrilla group. In early 1944, Volckmann established USAFIP-NL headquarters in western Benguet, and in August 1944, received a radio set allowing direct contact with SWPA for the first time since March 1943. On 30 October 1944, Volckmann's forces rescued Mrs. Osmena and family from Baguio. In November, Volckmann's forces were first supplied by submarine, the USS Gar.

After the start of the Battle of Leyte, Volckmann's forces eliminated those Second Philippine Republic Bureau of Constabulary units created by the Japanese who did not surrender. Volckmann organized the Commonwealth military and guerrilla resistance among the Ifugao's 11th Infantry Battalion; they were led by 1st Lieutenants: Francisco Balanban, Alpha Company; Guinid Tuguinay, Bravo Company; Pedro Dulnuan Sr., Administration. Volckmann's forces operated in the western and northern coasts of Luzon, launching attacks against the Japanese occupiers. During the U.S. and Filipino invasion of the Philippines in January 1945, Volckmann's guerrillas cut key communication lines, bridges, and isolated enemy barracks. Once the invasion forces had landed, he led attacks against the retreating Japanese forces far behind the lines, capturing bases and air fields, thereby allowing the American advance to proceed at a much quicker pace.

Volckmann's guerrillas numbered about 8,000 men at the start of the Battle of Luzon, but grew to 18,000 when supplied by the Sixth United States Army. They consisted of five infantry regiments: the 11th, 14th, 15th, 66th, and the 121st, with Volckmann as the Commander, United States Armed Forces in the Philippines—Northern Luzon or USAFIP-NL (Military and Guerrillas). His force played an instrumental role in the Battle of Bacsil Ridge, Battle of Bessang Pass, and Battle of Mayoyao Ridge.

== Post-World War II ==
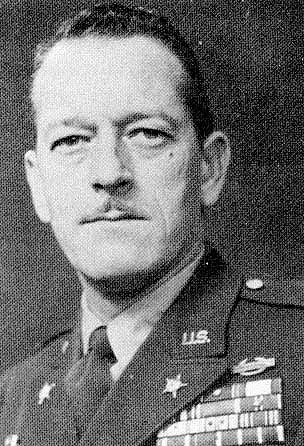
Volckmann, after World War II

In December 1945, Colonel Volckmann briefly returned to the United States to reunite with his family. After two months of leave and medical treatment due to his exposure to various diseases in the Philippines, he returned to the Philippines to assist in unfinished business related to his command as the guerrilla leader of North Luzon. This included investigation of war crimes, payments to civilians of vouchers issued during the war, and confirmation of pay to local soldiers and guerrilla fighters. He did not return again to the United States until July 1946. Due to his illnesses and the stress of continual combat, Volckmann would not be released as a medical patient until early 1948.

After his official release as a patient, General Dwight D. Eisenhower, now Chief of Staff of the United States Army, ordered Volckmann to write what would become the army's first official counterinsurgency doctrine. During 1948–1949, Volckmann was busy writing this new technical manual, based on his experiences in the Philippines. He also graduated from the Armed Forces Staff College in 1949. In September 1950, FM 31-20 Operations Against Guerrilla Forces was released. This was just in time, as the Korean War began when South Korea was invaded by the North Koreans in June 1950. The North Koreans made extensive use of guerrillas and regular U.S. Army doctrine was ineffective against them. General MacArthur requested that Colonel Volckmann be immediately assigned to Eighth Army Headquarters, and he appointed Volckmann as Executive Office of the Special Activities Group (SAG)-Far East Command, a combination of U.S. Army Rangers, U.S. Marines and South Korean troops. The unit was commanded by Colonel Louis B. Ely, a veteran of the OSS. As executive officer, Volvkmann's duties were to plan and conduct guerrilla activities behind North Korean lines. Less than six months into this new position, Volckmann was evacuated to the United States due to a relapse of a medical condition, most likely a severe stomach ulcer, he had incurred in the Philippines.

Upon his return, Volckmann began a new writing assignment, and, in 1951, FM 31-21 Organization and Conduct of Guerrilla Warfare was released. Brigadier General Robert A. McClure, director of the Office of the Chief of Psychological Warfare (OCPW), asked Volckmann to become OCPW's Chief of Plans—Special Operations Division. Joining Volckman were Colonel Aaron Bank, a former OSS operative who served with the Jedburghs in Europe; Colonel Wendell Fertig, another major leader of guerrilla resistance in the Philippines; and Colonel Melvin Blair, a veteran of "Merrill's Marauders".

After attending the National War College, in Washington, D.C., during 1953–1954, Volckmann served as Chief of Special Operations Division, U.S. European Command, from 1954–1956.

In 1956, Volckmann completed the Basic Airborne Course at Fort Benning, Georgia. At that time, he was 45 years old and one of the oldest soldiers to take and complete that course. The course was required since he then served as assistant division commander, 82nd Airborne Division, at Fort Bragg, North Carolina, during 1956–1957.

Due to his service with irregular troops in the Philippines and loss of contact with the U.S. Army, Volckmann's promotions were also irregular. Though only a first lieutenant at the outbreak of hostilities, he had been made a temporary captain on 9 September 1940 and temporary major on 19 December 1941. Volckmann received a permanent promotion to captain on 12 June 1944 before receiving temporary promotions to lieutenant colonel on 9 October 1944 and colonel on 4 February 1945. However, he reverted to temporary lieutenant colonel on 1 July 1947, receiving his permanent promotions to major on 15 July 1948 and lieutenant colonel on 14 May 1951. Volckmann became a temporary colonel again on 29 June 1951. He received his final temporary promotion to brigadier general on 30 December 1956.

In July 1957, Volckmann retired from the Army after 27 years of military service, including his four years as a cadet at West Point.

The Special Forces Association lists Volckmann one of three men who "used their wartime experience to formulate the doctrine of unconventional warfare that became the cornerstone of SF [Special Forces]," Bank often receives credit for being the true founder, but this is because he created the Table of Organization for the Special Forces and commanded the first units. In a letter dated 23 February 1969, Bank gives credit to Volckmann for "the development of position, planning and policy papers that helped see the establishment of Special Forces units in the active Army". Volckmann and Fertig both commanded corps-sized guerrilla units in World War II and organized them from the ground up. They had developed the doctrine of U.S. military guerrilla insurgency that guides the Special Forces today.

== Later life ==
After retiring from the U.S. Army, Volckmann was president of Volckmann Furniture Manufacturing Company in Morrison, Illinois. He was also president of Zeffyr Industries and president of Volckmann Division of Ethan Allen Inc., from 1970 until his retirement in 1977.

Volckmann remained active in military matters following his retirement. For example, in 1962, he was asked by the U.S. Air Force to lead a Rand Corporation study panel on the feasibility of air support in counterinsurgency operations.

Volckmann moved to Harlingen, Texas in 1977. He was diagnosed with cancer in 1981 and died on 30 June 1982 in Iowa City, Iowa. Attending his funeral were several officials representing the Philippine government: Brigadier General Angel G. Kanapi, defense attache of the Philippine Embassy in Washington, D.C.; Nick Nor Paynor Jr., aide to General Kanapi; and Mr Esperanto Curaming, representing the Philippine Consul General of Chicago. Also in attendance was his old comrade, Brigadier General Donald Blackburn, who was then living in McLean, Virginia. Volckmann is buried in his family's plot at Springdale Cemetery in Clinton, Iowa.

== Family ==
After graduating from West Point, Volckmann married Nancy Sorley in 1934. In 1936, a son, Russell Jr., was born. Although both accompanied him to the Philippines in 1940, they were forced to return to the United States with other military dependents in August 1941. In March 1942, his wife received a letter from him before the surrender of Bataan, It would be the last his family would hear from him until January 1945.

Upon Volckmann's second return to the United States in July 1946, his wife Nancy requested a divorce, which was finalized in August 1947.

On 28 August 1948, he married Helen Rich, and they had two sons. They remained married until Volckmann's death in 1982.

== Awards and decorations ==
His decorations include:

Combat Infantryman Badge
Distinguished Service Cross with bronze oak leaf cluster
Distinguished Service Medal	Silver Star	Legion of Merit
Bronze Star with bronze oak leaf cluster	American Defense Service Medal with one bronze service star	American Campaign Medal
Asiatic-Pacific Campaign Medal with two bronze campaign stars	World War II Victory Medal	National Defense Service Medal
Korean Service Medal with three bronze campaign stars	Philippine Defense Medal	Philippine Liberation Medal with one bronze service star
Philippine Independence Medal	United Nations Korea Medal	Korean War Service Medal
Army Presidential Unit Citation with two bronze oak leaf clusters	Philippine Republic Presidential Unit Citation (Army Version)	Republic of Korea Presidential Unit Citation (Army Version)

== See also ==
- List of American guerrillas in the Philippines
- Donald Blackburn

== Sources ==
- Volckmann, Russell (1954). We Remained: Three Years Behind Enemy Lines in the Philippines. W. W. Norton & Company. OCLC 1535784.
- Guardia, Mike (2010). American Guerrilla: The Forgotten Heroics of Russell W. Volckmann. Philadelphia, PA: Casemate Publishers. ISBN 978-1-935149-22-4. OCLC 528429065.
- Harkins, Philip (1956). Blackburn's Headhunters. Cassel & Co. Ltd. OCLC 1827222.
- Hogan, David W. Jr. (1995). U.S. Army Special Operations in World War II. Washington, D.C.: Center of Military History, Department of the Army. Archived from the original on January 14, 2008.
- Smith, Robert Ross (2005). Triumph in the Philippines. Honolulu, HI: University Press of the Pacific. ISBN 978-1-4102-2495-8. OCLC 668251410.
- Brooks, M. Evan (2003). Military History's Top 10 Lists: Great Commanders, Improbable Victories, Unlikely Heroes, and Other Martial Oddities. New York: Gramercy Books. ISBN 978-0-517-22174-7. OCLC 51770253.
- Bagamaspad, Anavic; Hamada-Pawid, Zenaida (1985). A People's History of Benguet. Baguio Printing & Publishing Company, Inc. OCLC 29914614.
