= Battle of Mayoyao Ridge =

Battle in world war II

- Part of the 1944–1945 Philippine campaign and the Pacific Theater of World War II
Date	July 26, 1945, to August 9, 1945
Location	Mayoyao, Mt. Province
Result	Allied victory

Belligerents
Commonwealth of the Philippines; Supported by: United States	Japan

Commanders and leaders
(United States) Donald Blackburn	

Units involved
United States Army Forces in the Philippines – Northern Luzon	(Empire of Japan) Imperial Japanese Army

The Battle of Mayoyao Ridge was part of the Philippines campaign of 1944–1945 during World War II.

From July 26, to August 9, 1945, Filipino soldiers of the 11th Infantry Regiment, United States Army Forces in the Philippines – Northern Luzon, under the command of Donald Blackburn, supported by airstrikes by Army Air Forces, captured the Japanese stronghold of Mayoyao, Ifugao in Northern Luzon.

== Historical marker ==
The memorial or historical marker, located at Mount Nagchajan in Mayoyao, Ifugao, marks the site of the “Battle of Mayoyao Ridge”. The battle was fought between the Japanese Imperial forces and the combined Filipino and American soldiers, towards the end of World War II. The result was key to the eventual surrender of General Yamashita at Kiangan, Ifugao.
