= List of American guerrillas in the Philippines =

After the invasion of the Philippines by the Japanese in 1941, several Americans, civilian and military, evaded capture or escaped imprisonment. This occurred on several islands in the archipelago. With the aid of the local Philippine population, these Americans survived. However, not content with just surviving and avoiding capture, these Americans formed resistance groups, which were soon recognized by the American military, and eventually supplied. Initially relegated to an intelligence gathering role, these groups eventually took a more active and aggressive role, such that they were an integral part of the American re-conquest of the country.

== Member list ==
Name	Notability	References
Bernard L. Anderson	US Army Air Corps Major. Formed Kalayaan Command in Tayabas Province that focused on intel work. Linked up with Alejo Santos in the Bulacan Military Area north of Manila. Colonel Jaime Manzano was his executive officer. Commanded 7,000 men.	
Robert Arnold	Commanded military and guerrillas of the 15th Infantry Regiment, Philippine Army which operated in Ilocos Norte. His thirty American soldiers joined forces with Walter Cushing's miners. He later joined Captain Guillermo Nakar's guerrilla outfit.	
George Norman Arnovick	Fought for the Filipino guerrillas in World War II. Born in Shanghai to an English family. Arnovick was later taken as a POW in a Japanese internment camp before later being rescued by the United States military. Once Arnovick arrived in America, he joined the Army Air Corps and later became the father of three children.	
Robert V. Ball	Enlisted man on Mindanao, joined Colonel Fertig's guerrilla group, sailed in May 1944 from Samar to Baler Bay on Luzon, and delivered a radio transmitter to Lapham.	
Joseph Barker	Captain, 26th Cavalry, Philippine Scouts, US Army. Commanded the East Central Luzon Guerrilla Area under Thorp, with Edwin Ramsey as adjutant and Bernard Anderson as Chief of Staff. After Thorp's capture, took command of Luzon Guerrilla Force. Captured in Manila while disguised as a priest. Bayoneted to death by the Kempeitai at Manila North Cemetery on 2 October 1943.	
George M. Barnett	Major, commanded the 2nd and 3rd Districts under Volckmann.	
Leon Beck	Escaped from the Bataan Death March to become a guerrilla.	
Henry Roy Bell	Professor, Silliman University. Major in the guerrilla forces on Negros island, head of the Free Government, printed the Victory News and ran a radio transmitter which established contact with SWPA and Fertig. Many Silliman students, alumni, faculty members and ROTC officers joined the resistance forces, numbering 10,811 men. The Bell family was evacuated by the USS Narwhal on 7 February 1944.	
Donald Dunwoody Blackburn (1916-2008)	11th Infantry Regiment, Philippine Army (11th Division, USAFFE). Did not join USAFIP surrender; evaded Bataan Death March. Joined Russell Volckmann. Helped organize Igorot guerrillas. Commanded 11th Infantry Regiment, USAFIP-NL.	
John P. Boone	US Army Corporal and wartime guerrilla Colonel who formed the Bataan Military District that conducted intel work and sabotage. Recipient of the Distinguished Service Cross.	
William E. Bowen (1905-1944)	Technical Sergeant, 228th Signal Corps Joined Troop C, 26th Cavalry Regiment, retreating from Camp John Hay. Became a guerrilla. Captured April 1943. MIA in Japanese prison ship torpedoed by US Navy.	
Robert V. Bowler	US Army officer. Guerrilla leader on Mindanáo.	
James Patrick Boyd	US Army; guerrilla on Luzon.	
Alfred Bruce	Sergeant, Philippine Scouts, US Army. Guerrilla Captain, 2nd Battalion, Provisional Regiment of Philippine Scouts, which operated in Zambales Mountains under Thorp.	
Parker Calvert	Major, commanded the 1st District under Volckmann.	
James W. Carrington	US Marine PFC, stationed on Corregidor. Captured after surrender of Corregidor. Escaped from Bilibid Prison, saved by Moises and Jesus Gonzales. Became Commandant of the Headquarters and Security Detachment of the East Central Luzon Guerrilla Army Forces; engaged the Japanese, for which he later received the Army Distinguished Service Cross. Retired from USMC as a captain in 1958. In 2008, Jesus Gonzales visited Carrington at Destrehan nursing home, 11 days before Carrington died.	
Henry Clay Conner Jr. (1918-2008)	US Army officers Conner and Anderson founded Squadron 155 (composed mainly of Aetas working for the Japanese air corps) that worked on collecting intel info. Conner's personal army consisted of several hundred Negritos. He married the sister of the Negrito chief, Kodario Laxamana.	
James McCloud Cushing	Mining engineer and brother of Walter and Charles. As combat officer of the guerrilla Cebu Area Command, he was commissioned Lieutenant Colonel and officially recognized as commander of the 8th Military District by SWPA GHQ, Australia. His "unit was disgraced" by Captain Harry Fenton's "brutality and dissoluteness". Cushing and his guerrillas accomplished an intelligence coup on 31 March 1944 by capturing Admiral Shigeru Fukudome and recovering a copy of "Combined Fleet Secret Operations Order No. 73," the naval battle plan for all-out effort to defeat the US Navy.	
Walter Mickey Cushing (September 12, 1907–October 2, 1943)	Civilian mining executive. Organized his miners and joined forces with Lieutenant Robert Arnold. His brother, Lieutenant Charles Cushing, ran another guerrilla camp, which included the gold miners Herb Swick and Enoch French, as Barker's Pangasinan district Commander, but as a Captain in 1943, he surrendered after they imprisoned his wife. French was later captured. Walter moved in and out of Manila disguised as a priest, Father Navarro. His men made one of the first guerrilla attacks on a Japanese convoy on 1 January 1942, which killed 60 and destroyed ten trucks with supplies, months before the Fall of Bataán. After more impressive successes, he was commissioned captain by Colonel Horan, and his group was incorporated into Horan's 121st Infantry Regiment, Philippine Army. He published The Echo of the Free North, based on news from San Francisco. Bayoneted to death by the Kempeitai at Manila North Cemetery on 2 October 1943, though Volckmann claims he was killed in a Japanese ambush at Jones, Isabela.	
Doyle Decker	Member of the 155th Provisional Guerrilla Battalion which operated in Central Luzón. Operated with Robert Mailheau and Frank Gyovai, under Lieutenant Clay Conner's command.	
Alvin J. Farretta	Guerrilla Captain on Luzon, awarded the Distinguished Service Cross.	
Harry Fenton (1907 – 1 September 1943)	Administrative officer of the guerrilla Cebu Area Command. His extreme repressive measures and punitive actions against suspected collaborators, fueled by fanatic hatred against the Japanese, led to his execution by Filipinos in 1943. Among the famous victims of his atrocities was the Mandaue lawyer and historian Eugeniano Ouano Perez, who was killed personally by Fenton on January 17, 1943, for incompetence.	
Wendell W. Fertig	US Army Colonel, overall guerrilla Commander on Mindanáo, with 33,000 men. His divisional commanders included Captain Charles Hedges (108th, plus chief of staff), James Grinstead (109th), Frank McGee (106th), Lieutenant Colonel Robert Bowler (105th) Lieutenant Colonel Edward E. McClish (110th), and Lieutenant Colonel Clyde Childress then Lieutenant Colonel Claro Laureta (107th). Fertig, with Aaron Bank and Russell Volckmann, founded the US Army Special Forces.	
Naomi Flores	Igorot, hairdresser and member of Miss U Spy Ring. Smuggled food and other supplies into prisoner of war camps and joined guerrillas in Luzon. Later became an American citizen.	
Richard R. Green	Civilian, along with Swick, escaped from Camp Holmes and joined the USAFIP-NL in April 1943.	
Edward James Haggerty	Jesuit priest. Joined guerrillas on Mindanao.	
Jack Hawkins	Lieutenant, 4th Marine Regiment, Corregidor. Interned at Cabanatuan POW camp. Transferred to Davao Penal Colony, escaped, joined guerrillas on Mindanao.	
Albert Hendrickson	Signal Corps private who became a wartime guerrilla Captain under Robert Lapham, commanding the Tarlac province. Conducted the Itogon Mine Raid in October 1942. Captured Tarlac City on 16 January 1945.	
John P. Horan	US Army Colonel. Commander, John Hay Air Base. Formed the 121st guerrilla regiment. Surrendered after the Fall of Corregidor.	
Ray C. Hunt	Far East Air Force sergeant, Provisional Air Corps Regiment infantryman in the Battle of Bataan and wartime guerrilla captain under Robert Lapham.	
Thomas S. Jones	US Army lieutenant. Sole survivor of Ralph Praeger's Troop C, 26th Cavalry Regiment, Philippine Scouts. Captured with Praeger.	
Dick Lang	PFC, US Army Air Corps Maintenance crewman, 19th Bomber Group, Clark Field. Became guerrilla leader on Mindanáo.	
Robert Lapham	US Army Philippine Scouts Lieutenant and wartime guerrilla Major on Luzón of 14,191 men. Commander of the Luzon Guerrilla Army Forces. Warned General Krueger of impending massacre of prisoners at Cabanatuan POW camp. Recipient of the Philippine Legion of Honor.	
Frank R. Loyd		
Edward E. McClish	Lieutenant Colonel in U.S. Army and guerrilla leader on the island of Mindanao. Commanded a force of more than 5,000 guerrillas in northeastern Mindanao	
Ralph McGuire	US Army Captain and civilian engineer. Commander of Western Luzon Guerrilla Area of Thorp's Luzon Guerrilla Force. Killed April 1943 by Negritos.	
Harry McKenzie	Former mining superintendent and trusted subordinate of Lapham.	
Steve Mellnik		
Gyles Merrill	Col guerrilla Commander on West Luzón. After leaving the camp run by William, Vernon and Catalina Fassoth, he was joined by Colonel Peter Cayler, and Captain George E. Crane, Captain Kadel, Private Leon Beck, Johnny Johns, and Raymond Herbert.	
Martin Moses and Arthur Noble	US Army Lieutenant Colonels in the 12th Infantry Regiment, Philippine Army and then the 11th Division, USAFFE who escaped to Benguet after Fall of Bataán. Organised United States Army Forces in the Philippines - Northern Luzon. Attacked Itogon Mines. Captured 3 June 1943 and executed three months later.	
Arthur Murphy	Head of intelligence under Volckmann.	
John O'Day	Former Brooklyn policeman who led a group of irregulars in Ilocos Norte and feuded with Captain Fermin Bueno's group. Organized the 15th Infantry under Volckmann.	
Yay Panlilio	She was a journalist with the Philippines Herald before the war. She was second in command of Marcos Augustin 12,000 guerrillas. She was also his mistress and the "brains of the outfit" which operated near Manila. The Marking Guerrillas had fierce "feuds" with the Hunters guerrillas, led by Eleuterio "Terry" Adeviso, resulting in "gunfights, kidnapping, and even executions."	
Chick Parsons	Longtime pre-war resident, polo player, and businessman, who escaped occupied Manila with his family and then returned multiple times as the principal operator, organizer, and executor of the SPYRON submarine missions to supply guerrillas, organize the coastwatchers, and rescue civilians & escaped POWs. Died in 1988 as a Filipino citizen and is buried at Manila Memorial Park.	
Robert C. Peyer	As a civilian and citizen of Switzerland and the Philippine Commonwealth, was awarded the Medal of Freedom for (as per his Citation) "outstanding courage and marked resourcefulness in providing food, clothing, and money for American prisoners of war and internees. Although under the constant watch of the Japanese, Mr. Peyer, by his inspiring bravery, resourcefulness, and devotion to duty, made a distinct contribution to the welfare and morale of American prisoners of war." Died as an American citizen in 1961 and is buried in Covington, Kentucky.	
Nicholas Daniel "Danny" Pociluyko	US Army Air Corps Staff Sergeant / Crew Chief 14th Bomber Squadron. Was at Clark Airfield when bombed Dec 8, 1941 then sent to Mindanao Dec 25, 1941 to support military resistance. Refused General Sharp's May 9, 1942 order to surrender with Beverly "Ben" Farrens, Lowell "Bit" Holder, Bill Johnson, John Spruill, and 7 others. Listed as "missing" for 18 months and within 10 months only 6 of the original 14 were still alive. Later was joined by Donald "Herb" Wills who had jumped from POW ship and swam ashore. In July 1942 in Kapai, met civilian engineers Jordan Hamner and Athol Y. "Chick" Smith, then risked his life to provide a cover story to help them pass through the territory of a local Chief (Fugitives, 2001 by Bob Stahl). Commissioned in the field to 2nd then 1st Lieutenant under Fertig. Directed a radio station and was coast watcher on the Zamboanga peninsula at Dipolog and Illigan in the Lanao province, moved about through Kapai Valley. Discovered a deserted six-thousand foot civilian airfield and directed Filipino troops under his command to renovate for landing of US planes; known as "Nick's Tower". Was involved in several fire-fights against Japanese attempts to take the airfield. According to personal letters from "Ben" Farrens, saved the lives of several pilots, saved and repaired numerous planes, helped aid escapees from Davao POW camp, and rescued ship wrecked soldiers. His accurate reports of Japanese ships were credited for US forces to sink or disabling of several enemy vessels. Often met and was counseled by Jesuit priest Father J. Edward Haggerty, per Haggerty's letter to his family. Returned to US in 1945. Retired in 1960 as Major. Interred with full military honors at Arlington National Cemetery.	
Ralph B. Praeger	US Army captain. Commander, Troop C, 26th Cavalry Regiment, Philippine Scouts, that operated in northeastern Luzón. Operated a radio transmitter, and formed a guerrilla force with two Lieutenants, Thomas Jones and Warren A. Minton, that included his troop plus disbanded Philippine Army troops, which then raided Japanese airfields at Tuguegarao, Cagayan and Aparri. After the Fall of Bataán, joined his force with Governor Marcelo Adduru's Cagayan-Apayao Forces. Northern Luzon Commander under Thorp. Captured in Apayao in July 1943; executed in Manila, December 1944.	
Charles Putnam	Mining engineer who received an emergency commission as a Captain, and then recruited guerrillas in the Lingayen Gulf area.	
Edwin Price Ramsey	US Army Lieutenant and guerrilla leader on Luzón of 13,000-14,000 men. Commanding a 27-man platoon, mostly of 'G' Troop, of the 26th Cavalry Regiment, Philippine Scouts, ordered the US Cavalry's last horse-mounted charge, 16 January 1942, in Moróng, Bataán. Commander of East Central Luzon Guerrilla Area. Took over Thorp's region after the capture of Thorp and Barker, which included Pierce Wade Recipient of the Distinguished Service Cross and the Philippine Legion of Honor. Ramsey was succeeded by Colonel Mario Pamintuan as Commander of guerrilla forces in northwest Pampanga, when Major Ramsey moved his central headquarters to the vicinity of Manila.	
Royal Reynolds Jr.	Major, Philippine Scouts, US Army. Commander, 3rd Battalion, Provisional Regiment of Philippine Scouts, which operated in Zambales Mountains.	
Iliff David Richardson	US Navy ensign, wartime US Army Major, guerrilla intelligence officer in the Visayan Islands and Chief-of-Staff under guerrilla Colonel Ruperto Kangleon.	
Grafton Spencer	Private, commanded the 2nd Battalion of the 66th Infantry under Calvert, but killed by the Japanese in April 1944.	
Jack Spies	26th Cavalry Regiment captain who joined Claude Thorp's Luzon Guerrilla Force as Commander of Southern Luzon. Killed by Japanese.	
Joseph St. John	One of Richardson's guerrilla radio operators on Leyte.	
Hugh Straughn	US Army retired Colonel. Organised Fil-American Irregular Troops (FAIT) which operated in Rizál. Executed by the Japanese August 1943.	
Herbert Swick	Civilian gold mining engineer who evaded the Japanese, and then joined the guerrillas in October 1942. Captured in early 1943, he escaped and joined the USAFIP-NL in April 1943.	
Claude A. Thorp	US Army Lieutenant Colonel. Provost Marshal, Fort Stotsenburg. Assigned by MacArthur to conduct intelligence operations in the Zambales Mountains during the Battle of Bataan. Formed Luzon Guerrilla Force after the fall of Bataán with his secretary and lover, Herminia Dizon or "Minang". Captured on 29 October 1942, 30 km west of Tarlac (Nom de guerre was Crabtree), along with his radioman Bill Brooks. Bayoneted to death by the Kempeitai at Manila North Cemetery on 2 October 1943.	
Carlyle Townswick	Guerrilla on Mindanáo.	
Russell William Volckmann	US Army officer, Philippine Commonwealth Army Regimental Officer in the Battle of Bataan. Escaped through Japanese lines with Blackburn. Became the Commander of United States Army Forces in the Philippines - Northern Luzon, with 22,000 men by the end of the war. He sought to bring the other guerrilla organizations on Luzón under his command, but was resisted by other Commanders, notably Robert Lapham. Korean War special operations officer. Post-war, authored US Army field manuals on guerrilla warfare. With Aaron Bank and Wendell Fertig, co-founder of the US Army Special Forces.	
Everett Warner	Major who operated a radio in Northern Luzon, but surrendered after the Fall of Corregidor.	

== Bibliography ==
- Bataan Diary .
- Bataan Diary, 121st Infantry Regiment .
- Breuer, William, MacArthur's Undercover War, Hoboken, New Jersey: Castle, 1995.
- Decker, Malcolm, From Bataan to Safety: the rescue of 104 American soldiers in the Philippines, McFarland, 2008. ISBN 978-0786433964.
- Guardia, Mike, American Guerrilla: the forgotten heroics of Russell W. Volckmann, Havertown, Pennsylvania / Newbury, England: Casemate, 2010. ISBN 1935149547. ISBN 9781935149545.
- Guardia, Mike, Shadow Commander: the epic story of Donald D. Blackburn, Havertown, Pennsylvania / Newbury, England: Casemate, 2011.
- Guerrilla Activities in the Philippines Archived 2016-01-31 at the Wayback Machine
- Guerrilla Days in North Luzon, US Army Forces in the Philippines, North Luzon, 1946.
- Guerrilla Resistance Movement in Northern Luzon, Quezon City: Office of Military History, Armed Forces of the Philippines.
- "Guerrillas in the Philippines",
- Harkins, Philip, Blackburn's Headhunters, New York: W.W. Norton, 1955.
- Keats, John, They Fought Alone: a true story of a modern American hero, Philadelphia: J.B. Lippincott, 1963.
- Lapham, Robert & Bernard Norling, 1996, Lapham's Raiders: guerrillas in the Philippines, 1942-1945, Lexington: University Press of Kentucky.
- Milligan, Denny, Lest We Forget: the brave and honorable guerrillas and Philippine Scouts of WW II.
- Mills, Scott, Stranded in the Philippines: Professor Bell's private war against the Japanese, Naval Institute Press, 2009. ISBN 9781591144977.
- Norling, Bernard, 1999, The Intrepid Guerrillas of North Luzon, Lexington: University Press of Kentucky. ISBN 0-8131-2118-3
- Ramsey, Edwin Price & Stephen Rivele, 1990, Lieutenant Ramsey's War: from horse soldier to guerrilla commander, New York: Knightsbridge, 1990; Washington, DC: Potomac Books, 1990; Washington: Brassey's, 1996. ISBN 1-57488-052-7.
- Richardson, Hal, One-Man War: the Jock McLaren story, Sydney: Angus and Robertson, 1957.
- Schaefer, Chris, Bataan Diary: an American family in World War II, 1941-1945, Houston: Riverview Publishing, 2004. ISBN 0-9761084-0-2.
- Schmidt, Larry, American Involvement in the Filipino Resistance Movement on Mindanao During the Japanese Occupation, 1942-1945, MMAS thesis, Fort Leavenworth, Kansas: US Army Command and General Staff College, 1982.
- Segura, Manuel, Tabunan: The Untold Exploits of the Famed Cebu Guerrillas in World War II.
- Sinclair, Peter Thomas, Men of Destiny: the American and Filipino guerrillas during the Japanese occupation of the Philippines, School of Advanced Military Studies, US Army. Archived 2014-09-03 at the Wayback Machine
- Special Operations in the Pacific
- Spencer, Louise Reid, Guerrilla Wife, New York, Thomas Y. Crowell, 1945.
- St. John, Joseph, Leyte Calling, New York: Vanguard, 1945.
- Utinsky, Margaret, "Miss U", San Antonio: Naylor, 1948.
- Volckmann, Russell William, We Remained: three years behind the enemy lines in the Philippines, New York: W. W. Norton, 1954.
- Whitehead, Arthur Kendal, Odyssey of a Philippine Scout, Bedford, Pennsylvania: Aberjona, Aegis. ISBN 0-9717650-4-9
- Willoughby, Charles Andrew, The Guerrilla Resistance Movement in the Philippines, 1941-1945, New York: Vantage, 1972.
- Wise, William, Secret Mission to the Philippines, E.P. Dutton, 1968; iUniverse, 2001. ISBN 0-595-19809-0
