= Battle of Bacsil Ridge =

Battle in the Philippines Campaign of World War II

- Part of the Second World War and the Philippines campaign (1944–1945)
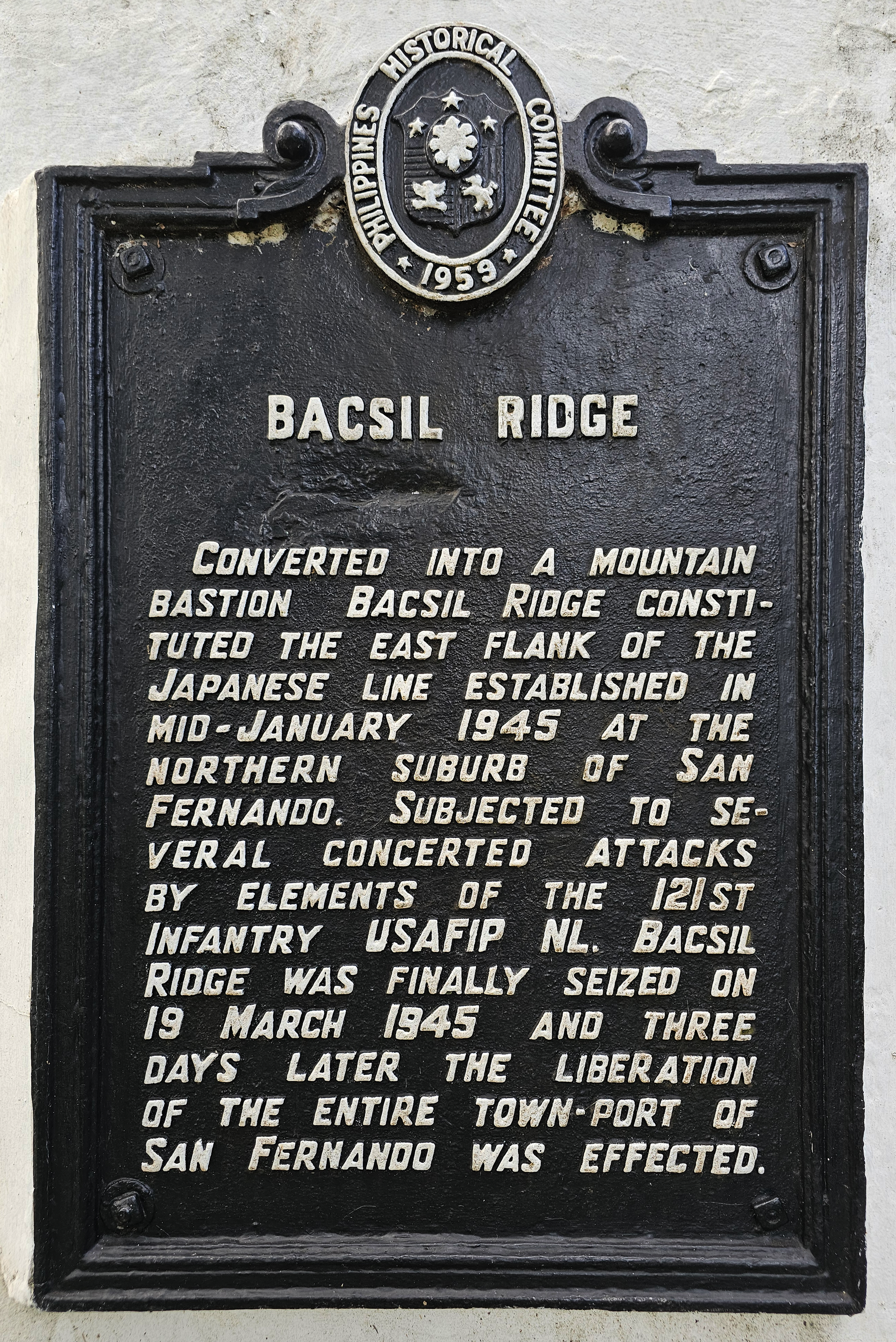
- Historical marker installed in 1959 at the site of the battle
Date	19 March – 23 March 1945 (4 days)
Location	San Fernando, La Union, Philippines 16°37′N 120°19′E
Result	Filipino-American victory

Belligerents
United States: Philippine Commonwealth	Empire of Japan

Commanders and leaders
Russell W. Volckmann; George Milton Barnett	Tomoyuki Yamashita; Toshio Hayashi

Units involved
121st Infantry Regiment, Philippine Commonwealth Army, USAFIP-NL	Japanese 14th Area Army

Strength
121st Infantry; 308th Bomb Wing	3,000 armed troops 2,000 unarmed support forces

Casualties and losses
877 casualties	3,322 killed 407 captured

The Battle of Bacsil Ridge began on 19 March 1945. It was one of the continued main battles of the 1944–1945 Philippines Campaign of the Second World War between the Filipino soldiers under the 121st Infantry Regiment, Philippine Commonwealth Army, USAFIP-NL, under the command of American General Russell W. Volckmann, and the Japanese Imperial forces under General Tomoyuki Yamashita, which resulted in the capture of San Fernando, La Union on 23 March 1945, and lead to the subsequent capture Bacnotan, La Union after two months of fighting between the armies and guerilla fighters.
