= Richard J. Meadows =

US Army Special Forces officer

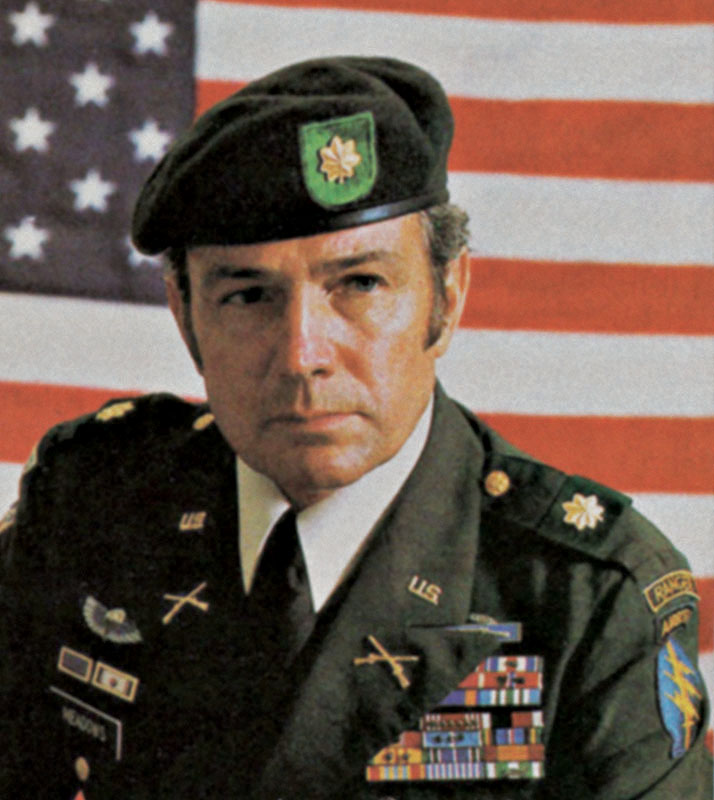
- Born: June 16, 1931; Alleghany County, Virginia, U.S.
- Died: July 29, 1995 (aged 64); Fort Walton Beach, Florida, U.S.
- Burial place: Barrancas National Cemetery
- Military career
- Allegiance: United States
- Branch: United States Army
- Service years: 1947–1977
- Rank: Major
- Nickname: "Dick"
- Units: United States Army Rangers; 7th Special Forces Group; 8th Special Forces Group; Special Air Service; MACV-SOG; Delta Force (as civilian consultant)
- Conflicts: Korean War; Vietnam War; Project Hotfoot; Operation Ivory Coast; Operation Eagle Claw
- Awards: Distinguished Service Cross; Silver Star (2); Defense Superior Service Medal; Legion of Merit; Bronze Star Medal

Richard James Meadows (June 16, 1931 – July 29, 1995) was a United States Army Special Forces officer who saw combat in Korea and Vietnam. He was a key figure in the Operation Eagle Claw in 1980, the rescue operation for the hostages of the Iran hostage crisis. He was a pivotal figure in the creation of the modern U.S. Army Special Forces.

== Military career ==
Meadows enlisted in the United States Army in 1946 at age 15. He first saw combat as a paratrooper in the Korean War with the 187th Infantry Regiment and was, by age 20, the youngest master sergeant in the army at that time. In 1953, he joined the recently formed 10th Special Forces Group and remained active with Special Forces and Rangers until his retirement in 1977.

In 1960, Master Sergeant Meadows, now with 7th Special Forces Group, was one of the first U.S. Army soldiers to participate in an exchange program with the British Special Air Service. Meadows completed SAS training and was an acting troop leader for 12 months, participating in field combat operations with the unit in Oman. Meadows' SAS experience may have helped form the basis for future US Army Special Forces selection, training, and organizational structures.

Later, in 1962, Meadows helped form 8th Special Forces Group in Panama.

=== Vietnam War ===
While assigned to the 8th Special Forces Group, MSgt. Meadows volunteered for a tour in Vietnam. Meadows served his first tour in 1965 as part of MACV-SOG (Military Assistance Command, Vietnam – Studies and Observations Group), where he participated in numerous deep reconnaissance missions into Laos and North Vietnam. During one such operation he captured high-quality film of North Vietnamese foot soldiers traversing South Vietnamese territory, directly contradicting the claims of the North Vietnamese government. On another occasion, he rendered several enemy artillery pieces useless by removing their sights, one of which was given to General William Westmoreland. Meadows' exploits so impressed Westmoreland that Meadows was given a battlefield commission on April 14, 1967.

In 1970, Captain Meadows was pulled from his position as commanding officer of Ranger School in Fort Benning to serve as a team leader for the initial assault team in the Son Tay prison camp raid. This 14-man team (plus pilots), code-named Blueboy, intentionally crash-landed an HH-3 helicopter right in the middle of the prison camp to achieve maximum surprise. One team member received a broken ankle in the landing but the remaining team members executed their mission without any further casualties. Much to Meadows' disappointment, however, the enemy had moved all its captives weeks earlier.

Meadows retired from the Army in June 1977 after 31 years of service.

== Later life and death ==
As a civilian, Meadows continued to work with the military and was a key figure in the founding of Delta Force, a special operations and hostage rescue force, in late 1977.

In 1979, Meadows was reportedly involved in the rescue operation of two Electronic Data Systems employees who had been imprisoned during the Iranian Revolution. Bull Simons, at the behest of Ross Perot, had headed the operation which succeeded in bringing the two home unharmed.

In 1980, Meadows returned to service as a special consultant and, posing as an Irish businessman in the European automotive industry, provided covert reconnaissance of the U.S. Embassy in Tehran prior to and during Operation Eagle Claw, better known as the Iran Hostage Rescue mission. Meadows was tasked with reconnoitering the embassy grounds, locating the hostages, and renting trucks to abet the hostage rescuers. The mission ended in a major accident at a ground refueling point in the Iran desert and was aborted. Although documents found at the crash site compromised both the mission and Meadows' cover in Iran, Meadows was able to escape Iran aboard a commercial flight with his cover intact.

In 1982, Meadows appeared on the cover of Newsweek magazine in an issue which included a feature article about his career.

In 1995, Meadows was diagnosed with and subsequently died of leukemia. Shortly before his death, H. Ross Perot rushed to convince President Bill Clinton to award Meadows the Presidential Citizens Medal. It is contended by many in the Special Forces community that, had the entire contents of Meadows' military record been disclosed, he would have been awarded the Medal of Honor. Nonetheless, the majority of Meadows' covert roles in Vietnam working with the CIA's Special Activities Division remain undisclosed.

He was buried in the Barrancas National Cemetery at Naval Air Station Pensacola.

== Legacy ==
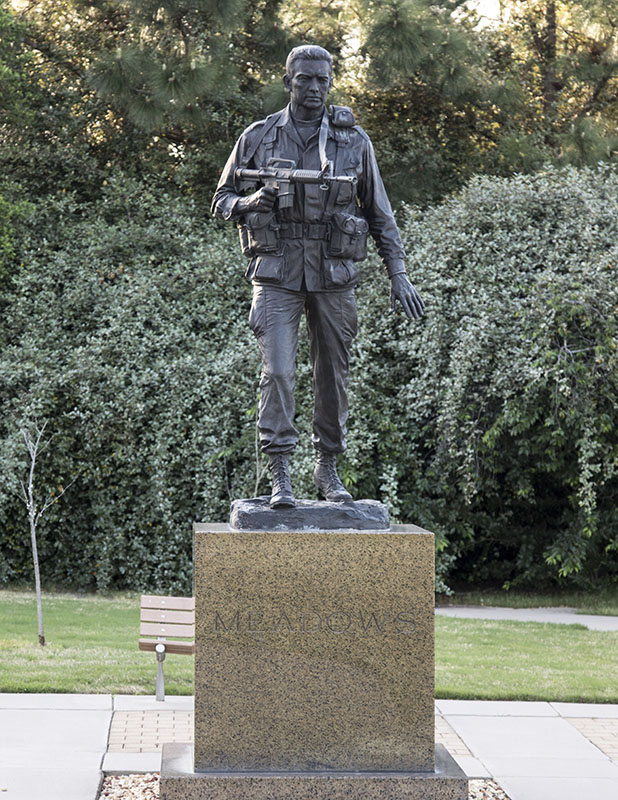
Statue outside the USASOC building

Meadows was inducted into the Ranger Hall of Fame by General Wayne Downing in 1996. He also was awarded the Bull Simons Award, a lifetime special operations forces achievement award.

In 1997, a statue and adjacent parade field near the U.S. Army Special Operations Command building in Fort Bragg, North Carolina were dedicated in Meadows' memory as the Meadows Memorial Parade Field. The statue, commissioned by H. Ross Perot, was created by Larry Ludtke. It depicts Meadows advancing with a CAR-15 in his right hand and his left hand stretched out behind him as if to tell his teammates "Stay where you are...I'll check it out".

== Awards and decorations ==
Major Meadows' military decorations and awards include the following:

Personal decorations
Distinguished Service Cross
Silver Star with 1 Oak leaf cluster
Defense Superior Service Medal
Legion of Merit
Bronze Star with "V" device for combat heroism
Air Medal
Meritorious Service Medal
Joint Service Commendation Medal
Army Commendation Medal with 2 Oak leaf clusters
Presidential Citizens Medal
Army Good Conduct Medal with bronze clasp with 5 loops (5 awards)
Army of Occupation Medal
National Defense Service Medal with 1 Service star
Korean Service Medal with 3 bronze Campaign stars
Armed Forces Expeditionary Medal
Vietnam Service Medal with 3 bronze Campaign stars
Vietnam Cross of Gallantry
United Nations Korea Medal
Republic of Vietnam Campaign Medal
Korean War Service Medal
Unit awards
Presidential Unit Citation with 1 Oak leaf cluster
Korean Presidential Unit Citation
Vietnam Gallantry Cross Unit Citation

Other accoutrements
Combat Infantryman Badge
Expert Infantryman Badge
Master Parachutist badge
South Vietnamese Parachutist Badge
Glider Badge
Scuba Badge
Special Forces Tab
Ranger tab
United States Army Special Forces Combat Service Identification Badge
8 Overseas Service Bars
6 Service stripes

In addition to the above, Meadows received numerous foreign awards and was eligible after his retirement for the Korean War Service Medal from South Korea and the Special Forces Tab.

Just before his death, in July, 1995, Meadows was told he was to be presented with the Presidential Citizens Medal by President Clinton.
