= Donald Blackburn =

United States Army general

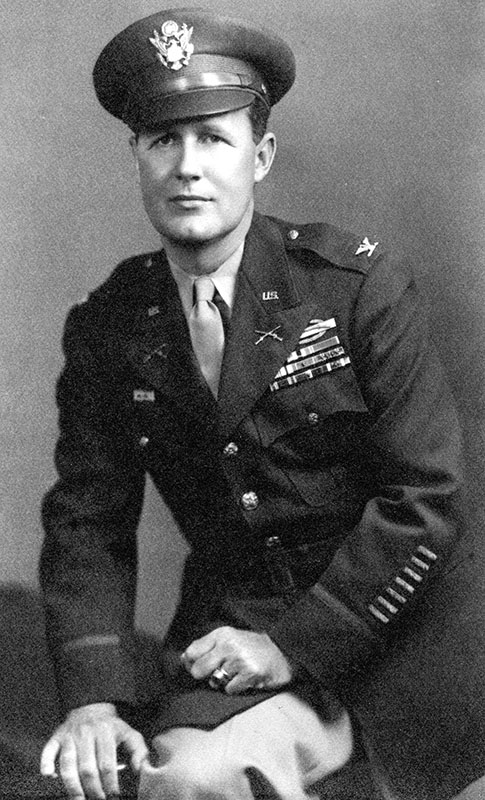
- Born: September 14, 1916; West Palm Beach, Florida, US
- Died: May 24, 2008 (aged 91); Sarasota, Florida, US
- Burial place: Arlington National Cemetery
- Military career
- Allegiance: United States
- Branch: United States Army
- Service years: 1938–1971
- Rank: Brigadier General
- Nickname: "Don"
- Units: 12th Infantry Division; 7th Special Forces Group
- Commands: 82nd Airborne Division; Studies and Observations Group; 77th Special Forces Group; 11th Infantry Regiment, Philippine Commonwealth Army
- Conflicts: World War II; Vietnam War
- Awards: Army Distinguished Service Medal (2); Silver Star; Legion of Merit (4); Bronze Star Medal; Purple Heart; Air Medal

Brigadier General Donald Dunwody Blackburn (September 14, 1916 – May 24, 2008) was a United States Army Special Forces officer, best known for his significant command and developmental roles in the United States Army Special Forces. He was also the commander of the highly classified Studies and Observations Group from 1965 to 1966.

== Military career ==
Donald Blackburn was commissioned a second lieutenant in the Infantry Reserve on May 30, 1938, and entered into active duty with the Army September 22, 1940, assigned to the 24th Infantry at Fort Benning, Georgia.

=== World War II ===
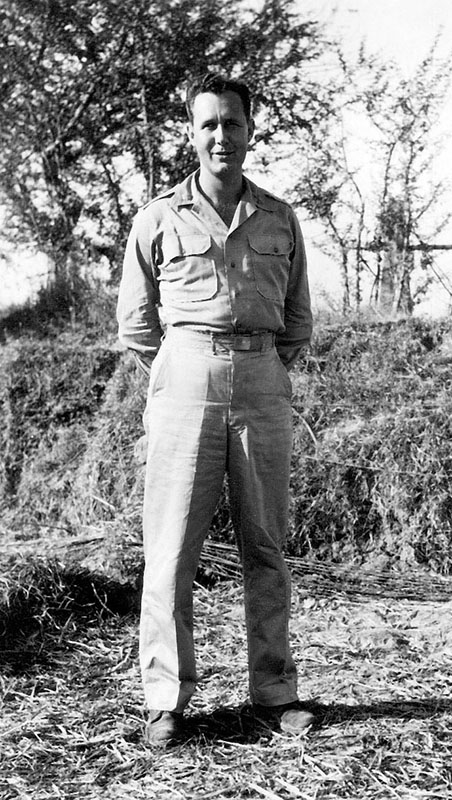
Lieutenant Colonel Blackburn in Luzon, Philippines, during World War II

At the outbreak of World War II, Blackburn was serving as an advisor to a battalion of the 12th Infantry Regiment, Philippine Commonwealth Army. Upon the fall of Bataan in April 1942, he evaded capture with his friend Captain Russell W. Volckmann, and until October 1945 conducted the Commonwealth military and guerrilla warfare on the island of Luzon. During this latter period, he reorganized and commanded the 11th Infantry Regiment, Philippine Commonwealth Army, which was integrated in October 1945 as a regular unit in the Philippine Commonwealth Army, under Major Eulogio Balao.

In January 1945, Blackburn established his headquarters in Tuao, building a C-47 airfield, roads, and re-establishing schools and hospitals in the Kalinga, Bontoc, Cagayan and Apayao. By March, Blackburn's regiment consisted of 5,000 soldiers and guerrillas, including Igorots and Bolomen. Blackburn's men supported the Sixth United States Army Force B in the capture of Aparri on 20 June. Blackburn was awarded the Silver Star after he led his men in the capture of Mayoyao, Ifugao, a stronghold of General Mikami's forces in August. Blackburn's forces received the surrender of Generals Mikami's and Marauka's forces on 14 August.

=== Postwar ===
Following World War II, Blackburn served in various command and staff assignments. He was assigned to the Department of Military Psychology and Leadership, Tactical Department, United States Military Academy, in 1950. In 1953, he attended the Armed Forces Staff College, Norfolk, Virginia. He was then assigned to NATO's Allied Forces Northern Europe in Oslo, Norway. He was promoted to the rank of colonel (O-6) on 20 July 1955. On return to the United States in 1956, he was assigned as commanding officer, 3rd Training Regiment, Fort Jackson, South Carolina.

=== Vietnam War ===
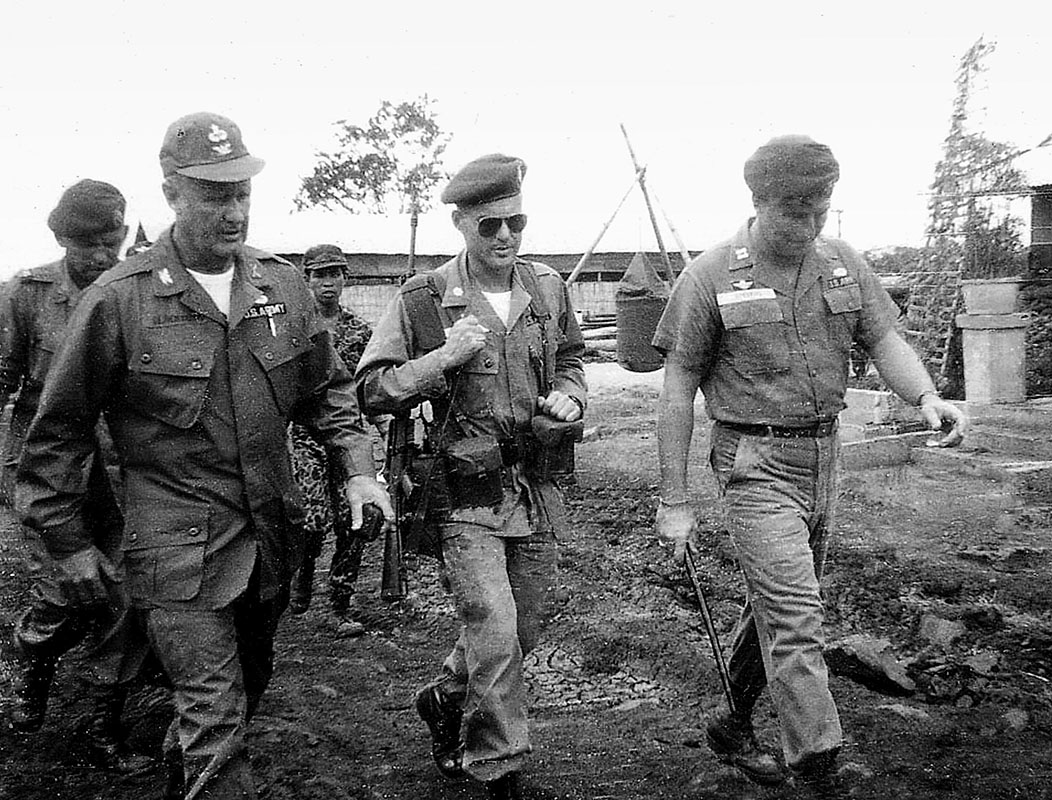
Blackburn (left) visits a MACV-SOG field location in Vietnam. As the commander of MACV-SOG, Blackburn restarted the cross-border operations that had been terminated with the failure of the LEAPING LENA program

In 1957, Blackburn was assigned to MAAG-Vietnam, and served as the senior advisor to the commanding general, 5th Military Region (Mekong Delta). In October 1958, he was assigned as commanding officer, 77th Special Forces Group (now the 7th Special Forces Group), where he was instrumental in initiating Special Forces operations in Southeast Asia. In 1959, as commander of the 77th SFG, Blackburn spearheaded Operation Hotfoot and its follow on, Operation White Star, in Laos. Operation White Star, which lasted from July 1959 to October 1962, used U.S. Army Special Forces to support the Royal Laotian government in operations against the Pathet Lao communist insurgency.

Following his command of the 77th SFG, Blackburn attended the 1960 class of the National War College and graduated in 1961. He then served as deputy director of developments for Special Warfare, Office of the Chief of Research and Development from 1961 to 1964. He was then reassigned to the office, Deputy Chief of Staff for Operations as Director of Special Warfare. Blackburn was SOG Commander (Studies and Observations Group) Military Assistance Command, Vietnam, from May 1965 to May 1966. On 7 January 1968, Blackburn was promoted to brigadier general.

In 1969 Blackburn was appointed as Special Assistant for Counterinsurgency and Special Activities (SACSA) and acted as the primary advisor to the Chairman of the Joint Chiefs of Staff on special operations. In that capacity, he assembled the first Operation White Star Mobile Training Teams. The first iteration was led by Bull Simons whom he had first gotten to know from the Philippines. While in the position, he authorized and oversaw the initial election of the Son Tay Prisoner of War Camp for Operation Ivory Coast in 1970, briefing General Earle Wheeler, then Chairman of the Joint Chiefs of Staff. He was part of the briefing of National Security Advisor Henry Kissinger. He is the one that chose Air Force Brigadier General Leroy J. Manor as overall commander of the raid, Bull Simons, Dick Meadows and "Doc" Cataldo. After the raid, he was the one that navigated the furor over the fact there were no prisoners at Son Tay.

=== After Vietnam ===
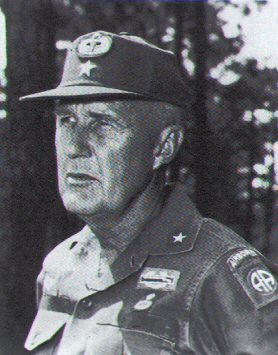
Blackburn as a brigadier general in the 1960s

Blackburn served as the assistant deputy director, Defense Communications Planning Group from August 1966 to August 1967, the assistant division commander, 82nd Airborne Division from September 1967 to October 1968, and the director of plans and programs, office of the Chief of Research and Development from October 1968 until his retirement in 1971.

Following his retirement from military service, Blackburn took a position with Braddock Dunn & McDonald, where he served as vice president, special projects until he retired in 1979.

== Personal life and death ==
On December 4, 1945, Blackburn married Ann Smith of Columbus, Georgia. They had two children.

He died on May 24, 2008, at Sarasota, Florida, and was buried in Arlington National Cemetery.

== Pop culture ==
Blackburn's exploits as a guerrilla leader during World War II in northern Luzon, Philippines, were chronicled in the book Blackburn's Headhunters by Philip Harkins (W.W. Norton & Company Inc., 1955). Harkins' book was made into a film called Surrender - Hell!, with Keith Andes playing Blackburn and released in 1959 by Allied Artists films. Blackburn was the technical advisor on the film.

== Awards and decorations ==
Blackburn was awarded the Silver Star, the Legion of Merit with three oak leaf clusters, Bronze Star, Army Commendation Medal, Air Medal, the Gold Star Medal (Philippines), the Medal of Merit (Philippines) and the Vietnam Army Distinguished Service Medal. He was authorized to wear the Distinguished Unit Citation with three oak leaf clusters, the Philippines Presidential Unit Citation, the Combat Infantryman Badge.

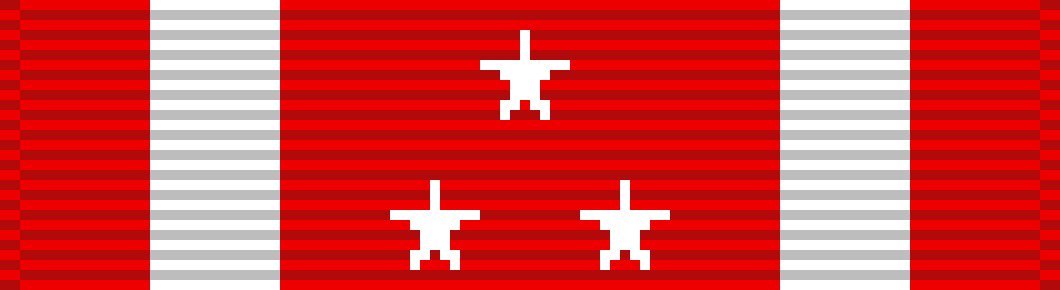

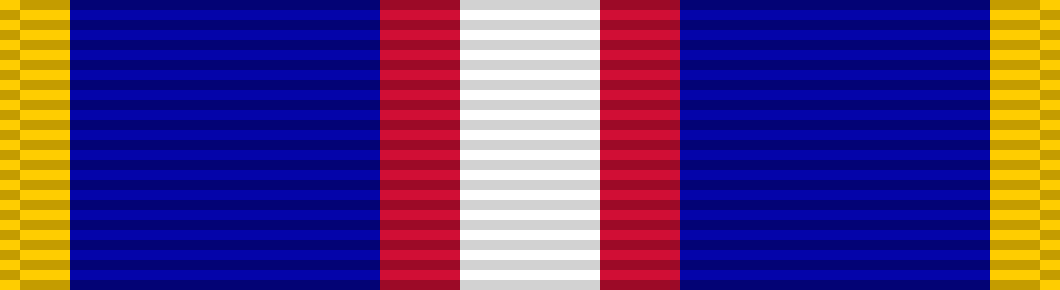

Badge	Combat Infantryman Badge		
1st row	Army Distinguished Service Medal with 1 Oak leaf cluster	Silver Star	Legion of Merit with 3 Oak leaf clusters
2nd row	Bronze Star Medal	Purple Heart	Air Medal
3rd row	Army Commendation Medal with 1 Oak leaf cluster	American Defense Service Medal with 'Foreign Service' clasp	American Campaign Medal
4th row	Asiatic-Pacific Campaign Medal with 4 Campaign stars	World War II Victory Medal	National Defense Service Medal with 1 Oak leaf cluster
5th row	Armed Forced Expeditionary Medal	Vietnam Service Medal with 2 Campaign stars	Philippine Defense Medal with 1 Campaign star
6th row	Philippine Liberation Medal with 2 Campaign stars	Philippine Independence Medal	Vietnam Campaign Medal
Badge	Master Parachutist Badge		
Tab	Special Forces Tab		
Unit awards	Presidential Unit Citation with 3 Oak leaf clusters		
Unit awards	Meritorious Unit Commendation	Philippine Presidential Unit Citation	Republic of Vietnam Gallantry Cross Unit Citation with Palm

Foreign Awards

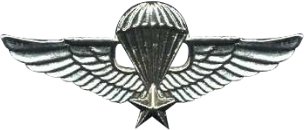

Republic of Vietnam Parachutist Badge
Military Merit Medal with Gold Star	Vietnam Army Distinguished Service Order 2nd Class

== See also ==
- List of American guerrillas in the Philippines
- Russell W. Volckmann
- USS Gar (SS-206)
- Wendell Fertig
- MACV-SOG
- Son Tay
