= 7th Special Forces Group (United States) =

Special Forces Group of the United States Army

7th Special Forces Group (Airborne)
- 7th Special Forces Group beret flash
- Active: 1960—present
- Country: United States
- Branch: United States Army
- Type: Special operations force
- Role: Primary tasks: Unconventional Warfare (UW); Foreign Internal Defense (FID); Direct Action (DA); Counter-Insurgency (COIN); Special Reconnaissance (SR); Counter-Terrorism (CT); Information Operations (IO); Counterproliferation of WMD (CP); Security Force Assistance (SFA)
- Size: 4 battalions
- Part of: 1st Special Forces Command (Airborne)
- Garrison/HQ: Eglin AFB
- Nicknames: Green Berets, Quiet Professionals, Soldier-Diplomats, Snake Eaters, Bearded Bastards Red Empire
- Mottos: "De Oppresso Liber", Spanish motto, "Lo Que Sea, Cuando Sea, Donde Sea," which translates as "Whatever, Whenever, Wherever."
- Engagements: Vietnam War; Operation Urgent Fury; Salvadoran Civil War; Operation Just Cause; War on terror: Operation Enduring Freedom; Operation Iraqi Freedom; Operation Freedom's Sentinel; War on drugs: Advise and assist operation in Mexico

Commanders
- Current commander: COL John Leitner

Insignia
- Former 7th SFG(A) recognition bar, worn by non-special operations qualified soldiers—in lieu of a beret flash—from the 1960s to 1984

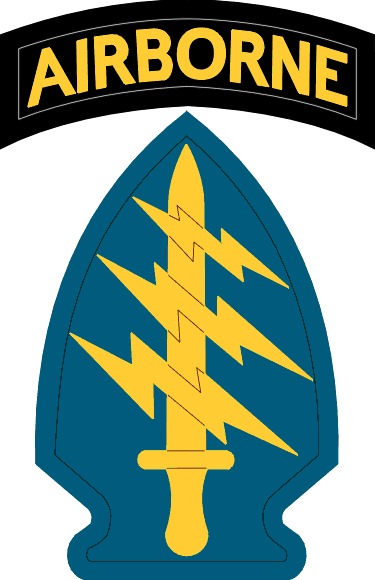
- 1st Special Forces Command (Airborne) shoulder sleeve insignia, worn by all 1st SFC(A) units

The 7th Special Forces Group (Airborne) (7th SFG) (A) is an operational unit of the United States Army Special Forces activated on 20 May 1960. It was reorganized from the 77th Special Forces Group, which was also stationed at Fort Bragg, North Carolina. 7th Group—as it is sometimes called—is designed to deploy and execute nine doctrinal missions: unconventional warfare, foreign internal defense, direct action, counter-insurgency, special reconnaissance, counter-terrorism, information operations, counterproliferation of weapons of mass destruction, and security force assistance. The 7th SFG(A) spends much of its time conducting foreign internal defense, counter-drug, and training missions of friendly governments' armed forces in South, Central, and North America as well as the Caribbean. 7th SFG(A) participated in Operation Urgent Fury in Grenada in 1983, and in Operation Just Cause in Panama in 1989. The 7th SFG(A) has, like all the SFGs, been heavily deployed to Iraq and Afghanistan in the war on terror.

== History ==
=== World War II ===
The 7th SFG (A) traces its lineage to the 1st Company, 1st Regiment, 1st Special Service Force (FSSF), which was established on 9 July 1942 at Fort William Henry Harrison, Montana. The unit was a combined Canadian-American commando unit, designed to conduct raids against Germany's fledgling nuclear capability in northern Europe. However, it was relocated to the Aleutian Islands to fight the Japanese. Upon the successful completion of the Aleutian campaign, the FSSF was transferred to the Mediterranean theater of operations. The unit earned the nickname "The Devil's Brigade" for fighting with distinction at the Anzio beachhead in Italy. It was the first Allied unit to enter Rome in June 1944. The commander of the 1st Regiment, Colonel Alfred C. Marshall, was killed in action leading that assault. The Force next served as an amphibious spearhead for the Allied landings in southern France in August 1944. The high rate of casualties from these campaigns made it necessary to disband the First Special Service Force at Menton, France on 5 December 1944.

=== 77th Special Forces Group ===
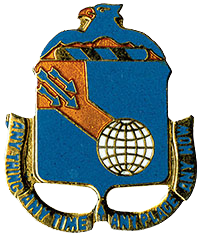
Historical 77th Special Forces Group Distinctive Unit Insignia (1953-1960)

The 77th Special Forces Group (Airborne) was activated at Fort Bragg, NC on 25 September 1953 under command of Lieutenant Colonel Jack T. Shannon. Its motto was "Any Thing, Any Time, Any Place, Any How." The group built rapidly from an initial strength of only 200 soldiers. The 77th Group wore their famous Green Beret headgear for the first time in a retirement parade for XVIII Airborne Corps commander MG Joseph P. Cleland in June, 1955. In the fall of 1955 it deployed into OPERATION SAGEBRUSH in Louisiana, the largest military exercise in the US since World War II. The 77th carried out unconventional warfare operations, the first time this had been employed in a US military exercise. In 1955–56, 77th Group conducted two cycles of mountain warfare training at Camp Hale, Colorado known as EXERCISE LODESTAR ABLE and LODESTAR BAKER. In April 1956 the 77th Special Forces Group transferred four detachments to the Pacific theater to serve as the cadre for the 1st Special Forces Group (Airborne), which activated at Okinawa in June 1957. In 1959, teams from the 77th Special Forces Group began to deploy to Laos under Project Hotfoot in an effort to forestall Communist encroachment in that kingdom. The group also deployed teams to South Vietnam in 1960 to train Vietnamese ranger and special forces personnel.

=== Reorganization as 7th Group ===
In 1960, the 77th was reorganized and redesignated as the 7th Special Forces Group (Airborne), 1st Special Forces. In the 1960s, the need for mobile training teams exceeded the capability of the US military, so the 7th Group provided the cadre for the 3rd Special Forces Group and the 6th Special Forces Group.

=== Vietnam ===
The 7th Group was active early in the Vietnam War, first operating in Laos (Operation White Star), and later in other global Cold War operations in addition to Southeast Asia (Laos, Thailand, and South Vietnam). 7th Group was the first unit in South Vietnam to have a member earn a Medal of Honor, Captain Roger Donlon.

=== Latin America ===
==== Beginning of operations in Latin America ====
At the same time, Special Forces were expanding into Latin America. In May 1962, the advance party from Company D, 7th Special Forces Group departed for Fort Gulick, Panama, in the Canal Zone, to establish the 8th Special Forces Group. In 1965 the 7th Special Forces Group participated in Operation Power Pack in the Dominican Republic. 8th Group was deactivated in 1972 and the unit redesignated as the 3rd Battalion, 7th Special Forces Group. The entire 7th Special Forces Group was scheduled for inactivation on 1 October 1980, and was unfunded after that in the completed and approved US Army Program Objective Memorandum (POM). Army Chief of Staff General Edward C. Meyer reversed the decision after USSOUTHCOM briefings and discussions with LTG Wallace H. Nutting, the CINCSOUTH, and LTC Charles Fry, the 3rd Battalion, 7th Special Forces Group commander, regarding the growing threat to Central America and the need for U.S. Army Special Forces to respond to the threat.

==== Special Forces Activities in El Salvador ====
Throughout the 1980s, 7th Special Forces Group played a critical advisory role for the Salvadoran armed forces, which grew from a force of 12,000 to a total of 55,000 men. The Salvadoran military became a highly trained counter-insurgency force under the tutelage of 7th Group. Due to the success of special forces in El Salvador, the 3rd Special Forces Group was reactivated in 1990.

==== Special Forces Activities in Honduras ====
The 7th Special Forces Group played an important role in preparing the Honduran military to resist and defeat an invasion from Nicaragua. 7th Group also trained the Honduran military in counter-insurgency tactics, which enabled Honduras to defeat the Honduran communist-backed guerrillas.

==== Counter-Narcotics Operations ====
7th Special Forces Group also became involved in counter narcotics operations in the Andean Ridge countries of Venezuela, Colombia, Ecuador, Peru, and Bolivia. The goal was not just to stop the flow of drugs into the United States, but to stem the violence that resulted from the drug trade in those countries.

==== Beginning of Operations against Manuel Noriega ====
During the 3 October 1989 coup against Noriega by some of his troops, members of 7th Group conducted reconnaissance operations near the road that led from the cuartel of Battalion 2000 to Panama City, giving the US Southern Command advanced early warning of the elite Panamanian unit moving to rescue Noriega, who was being held captive in the Panamanian Comandancia. Meanwhile, one 7th Group Company was being readied to take custody of Noriega. When the coup was over and Noriega was released, that company prepared a raid on the Carcelo Modelo where American Kurt Muse was being held for operating an illegal radio station that was broadcasting anti-Noriega programming. That mission was later turned over to 1st SFOD-D and performed on D-Day during Operation Just Cause. From 19 December 1989 to 31 January 1990, elements of the 7th Special Forces Group participated in Operation Just Cause to restore democracy to Panama. The 7th Group conducted combat operations on D-Day against multiple strategic targets. Over the next two weeks, 7th Special Forces Group conducted many reconnaissance and direct action missions in support of the operation.

==== Raid to destroy Radio Nacional equipment ====
The 7th SFG was stationed in Hangar 450, at Albrook Air Force Station. The Panamanian radio station called Radio Nacional broadcast recordings of pro-Noriega propaganda to encourage the Panamanian population to continue fighting as an insurgency against the Americans. As the 7th SFG command wanted the propaganda broadcasts to be disabled, a force of 7th SFG operators was sent in to disable the broadcasts. They would be going in with little intelligence. A team of operators flew in on helicopter transports to the radio station and fast-roped onto the roof of the seventeen-floor building, while a ground team attacked from below. The Americans had speed and surprise on their side. They blew the radio antenna off the roof with explosives, then assaulted the radio stations offices. There was no staff present and the broadcast source was an automated recording. The operators destroyed the radio equipment with rifle rounds and explosives, causing the automated radio transmissions, which were on the AM band, to cease. The operators then began to exfiltrate, but at one point, they were confronted by an armed civilian security guard, aiming his weapon at them. Not wishing to kill him, they shot him in the shoulder, then treated the injury and turned him over to Panamanian firefighters responding to the fire. The force then safely returned to hangar 450.

==== Successful Destruction of pro-Noriega broadcasts ====
After the American Special Forces operatives came back to Hangar 450. They deployed again to destroy the FM broadcasts of pro-Noriega propaganda. The American commandos placed demolition charges which finally and successfully destroyed the remote FM antenna. After successfully destroying the antenna, the broadcasts were finally off the air.

==== Final Stability Operations ====
When combat operations ceased, Operational Detachments-A and -B fanned out over the entire country, living in villages with the people. 7th Group soldiers restored public utilities such as water and power while maintaining a watch on the (then) new Panamanian Police Force. Non-commissioned officers served as temporary judges and mayors gaining enormous support from the populace.

=== Global war on terrorism ===
Since early 2002, the 7th SFG has deployed almost nonstop in support of Operation Enduring Freedom in Afghanistan. 7th SFG along with the 3rd Special Forces Group are the two SFGs responsible for conducting operations in Afghanistan. The Group has also deployed in support of Operation Iraqi Freedom numerous times, but not as often as Afghanistan.

=== Relocation ===
In 2011, 7th SFG(A) relocated from Fort Bragg, North Carolina, to Eglin Air Force Base, Florida, as part of the 2005 Base Realignment and Closure (BRAC) round.

== Subordinate units ==
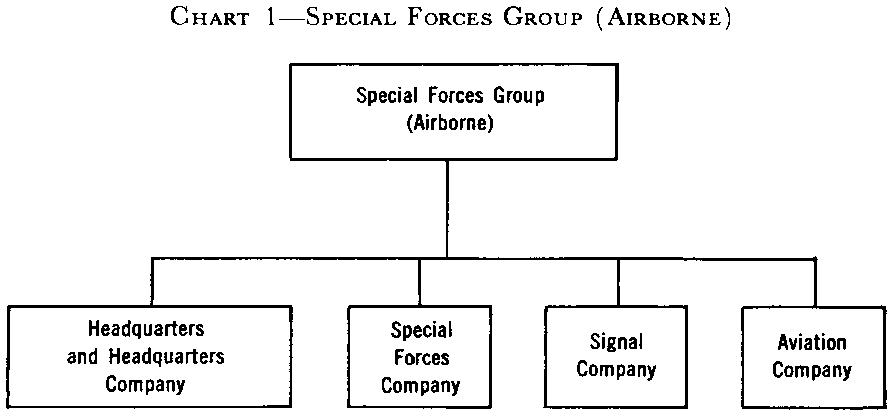
Special Forces Group organization in the Vietnam era

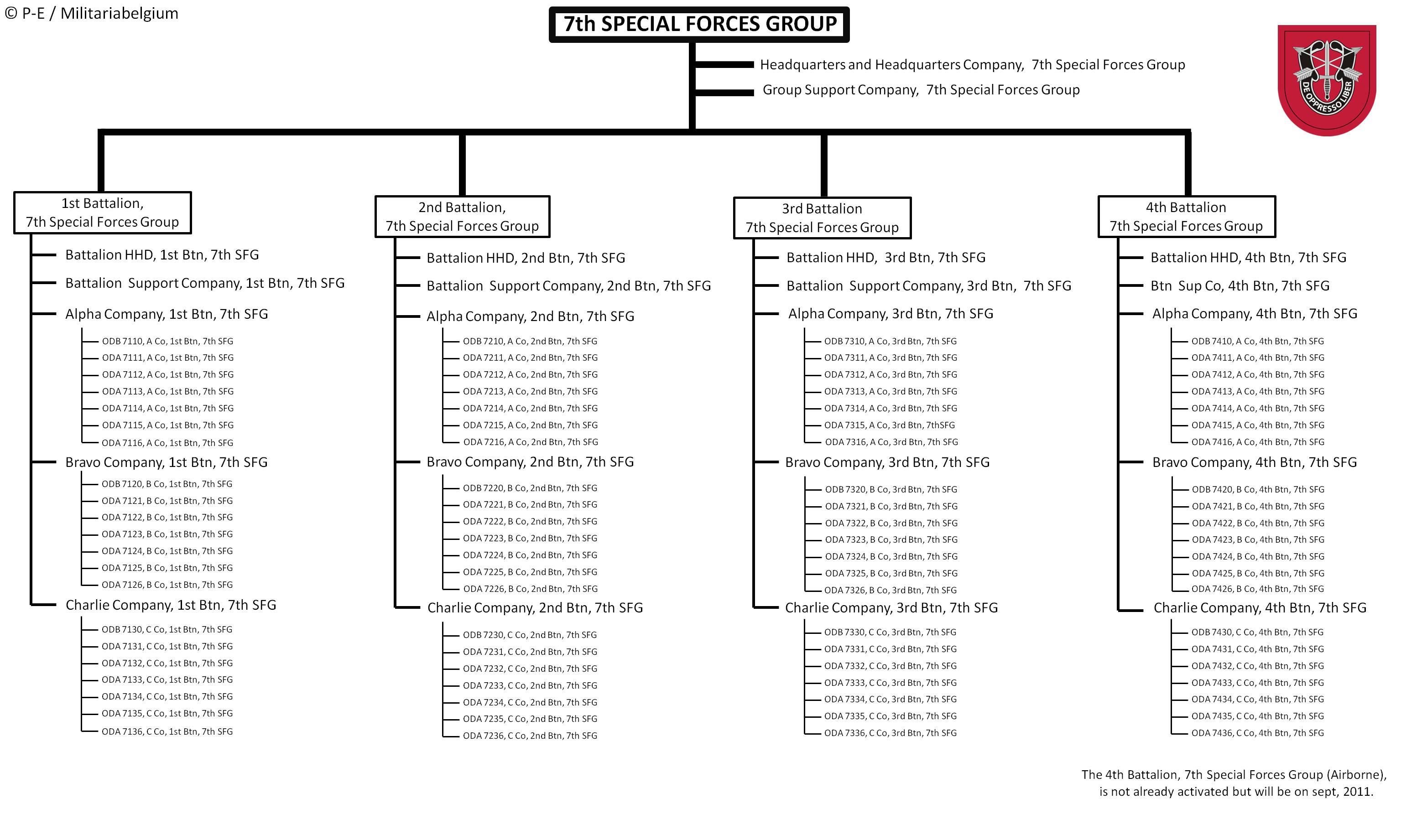
Current structure of the 7th SFG(A)

== Gallery ==
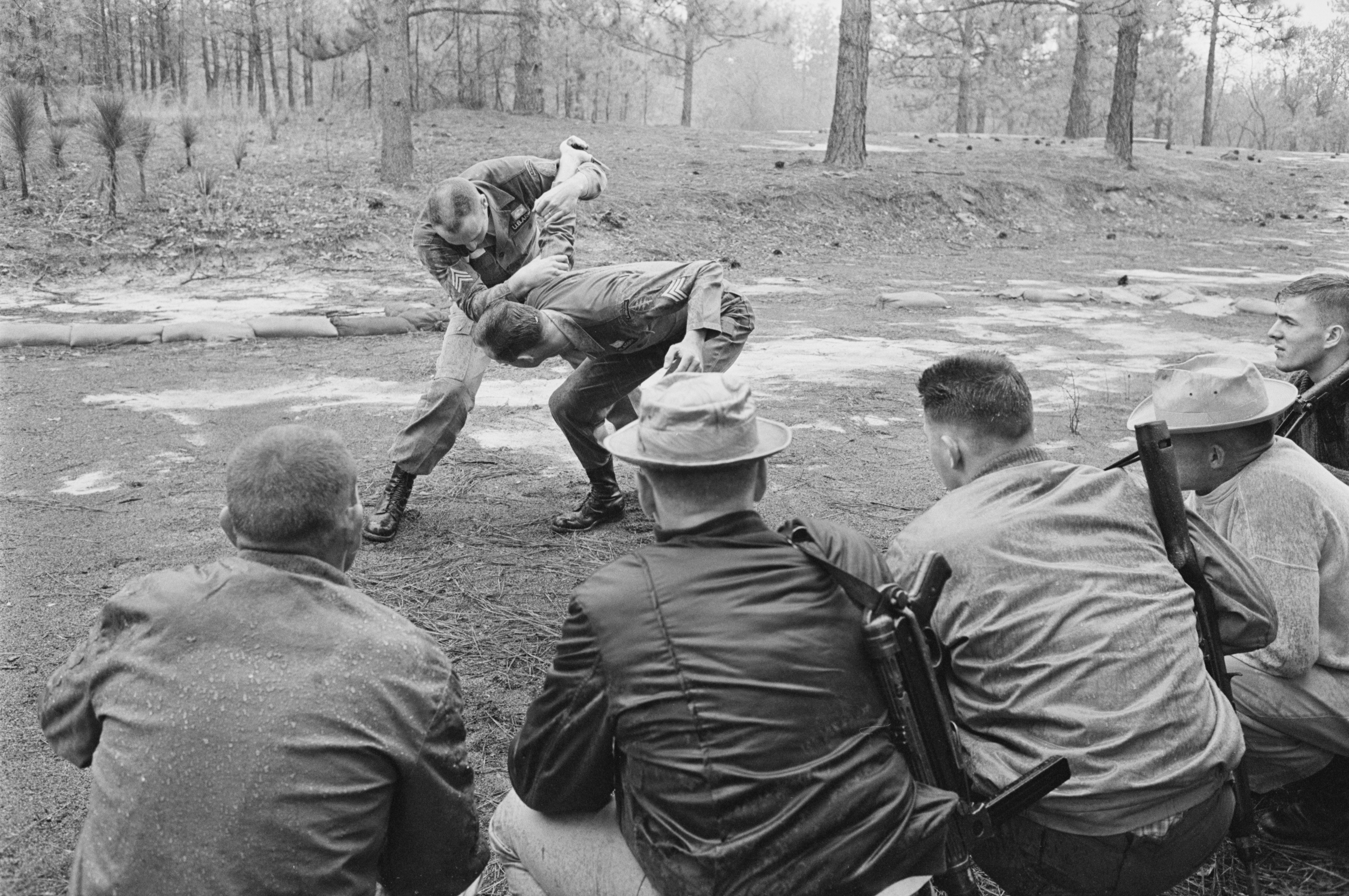
Members of the 7th SFG(A) demonstrating maneuvers for disarming the enemy, February 1961

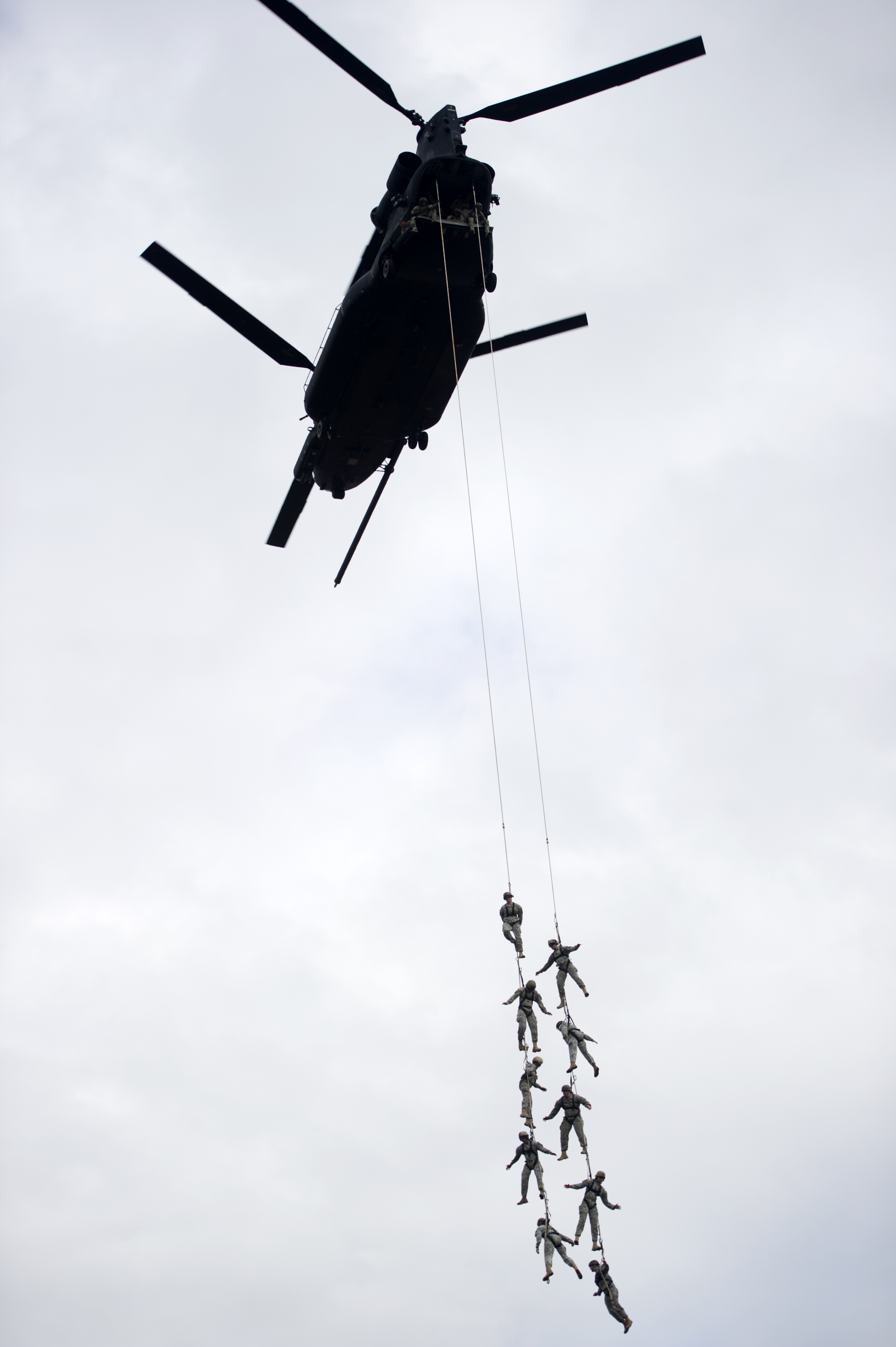
Soldiers from the 7th SFG(A) practice SPIE techniques from a MH-47 Chinook at Eglin AFB, February 2013

Soldiers from the 7th SFG(A) conduct HALO jump operation from a CV-22 Osprey

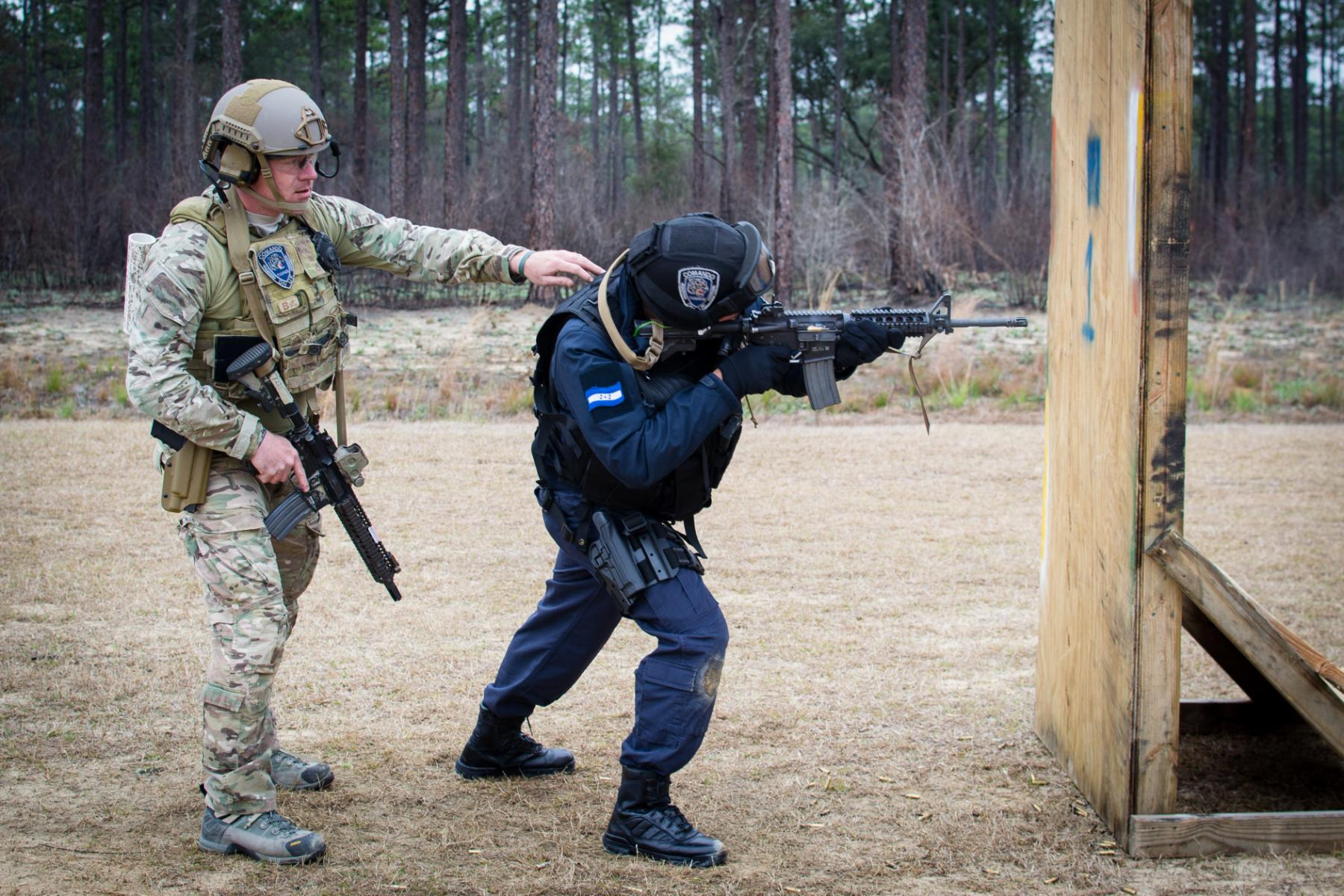
Honduran Tigers during a shooting drill at an Eglin Air Force Base range

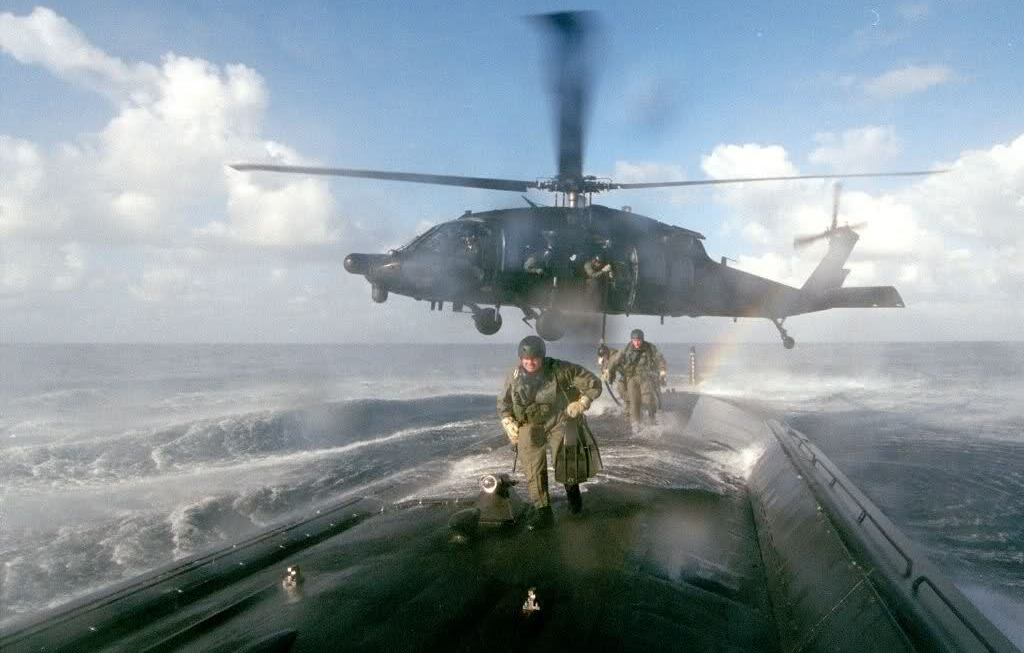
MH-60L from 160th SOAR deploys an ODA from 7th SFG(A) on board a U.S. submarine

== Notable soldiers ==
- Brigadier general Donald Blackburn, early commander of the 7th SFG
- Colonel Roger Donlon, Detachment Commander ODA 726, Medal of Honor recipient
- Sergeant Major Brendan O'Connor, awarded the Distinguished Service Cross for his actions during Operation Kaika while serving with the 7th SFG.
- Staff Sergeant Barry Sadler, Vietnam veteran and songwriter who served with the 7th Group as a Special Forces Medical Sergeant, author of Ballad of the Green Berets.
- Colonel Arthur D. Simons, early officer of the 7th SFG, 1958, led the Son Tay raid
- Major Lauri Törni, aka Major Larry Thorne, a former 7th SFG soldier who was killed on a 1965 covert MACV-SOG mission in Vietnam
- SMA Michael Weimer, former 7th SFG soldier, Delta Force operator, and 17th Sergeant Major of the Army
