= Command General Staff College Foundation =

US educational non-profit organization

The Command General Staff College Foundation, Inc. is a 501(c)(3) educational non-profit formed to support the U.S. Army Command and General Staff College located at Fort Leavenworth, KS. It was established in December 2005 by its three founders, retired Lt. Gen. Robert Arter, retired Colonel Robert R. Ulin and retired Colonel Willard B. Snyder. Col. Robert R. Ulin became the foundation's first Chief Executive Officer serving from 2005 to 2013. The foundation supports academics, the service members and their families who work and attend the college.

The CGSC Foundation support for the College is in three general areas: Scholarship, Outreach, and Soldier & Family Support. Specifically, the mission of the CGSC Foundation is to:

- Enrich the College's academic environment
- Foster a strong relationship between the military and the private sector
- Enhance the institution's research activities
- Promote leader development
- Encourage excellence in the faculty and student body
- Maintain contact with alumni

== Oversight ==
The foundation is governed by a board of trustees ranging from 20 to 40 people from a mixture of civilian and military backgrounds. The foundation also has consistently filed IRS Form 990s throughout its history which can be found on the GuideStar website.

== Programs ==
The foundation has a wide variety of programs in support of the college. These range from academic awards to children's reading programs to The Arthur D. Simons Center for the Study of Interagency Cooperation.

=== Distinguished Leadership Award ===
CGSCF gives a Distinguished Leadership award to recognize contributions to service members, their families, and the nation.

Past awardees include:

- Gen. Colin Powell in 2008
- Gen. Gordon Sullivan in 2009
- Mr. Ross Perot in 2010
- Gen. Hugh Shelton in 2011
- Gen. David Petraeus in 2012
- Mr. Kenneth Fischer in 2014

=== The Arthur D. "Bull" Simons Center for the Study of Interagency Cooperation ===
The Simons Center was established in April 2010 as a result of a generous gift from H. Ross Perot to the Command and General Staff College Foundation, Inc. Mr. Perot had a long history of supporting military members and their families. He chose the name after "Bull" Simons, a legendary U.S. Army Special Forces officer who led the rescue of Mr. Perot's employees from Iran in 1978. The Simons Center has a number of publications to include an Interagency Journal and Books with worldwide authorship.
