= John A. Heintges =

United States Army general

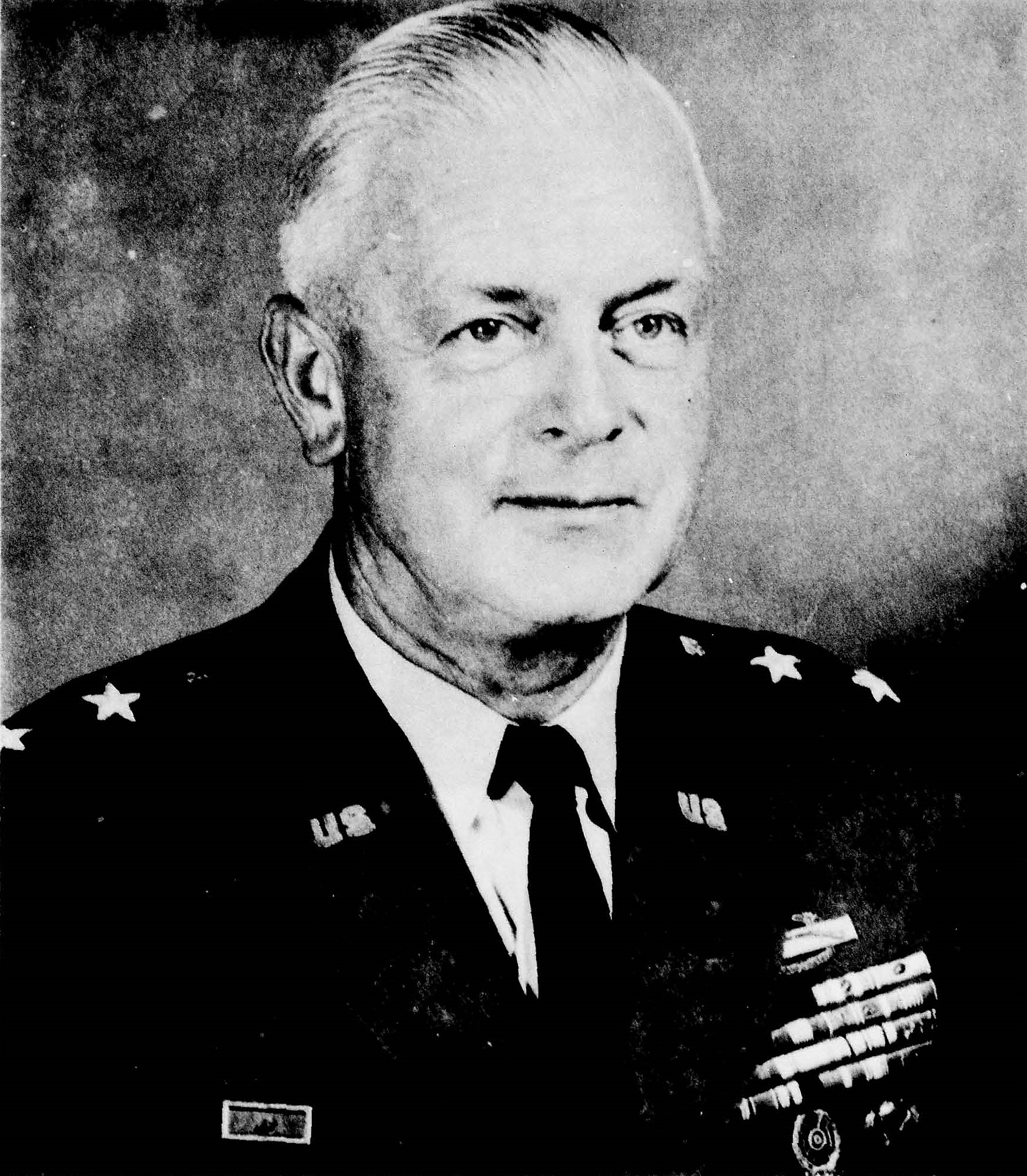
- Heintges at Fort Benning, Georgia, in 1964
- Born: 9 December 1912; Koblenz, German Empire
- Died: 31 March 1994 (aged 81); Colorado Springs, U.S.
- Burial place: West Point Cemetery
- Military career
- Allegiance: United States
- Branch: United States Army
- Service years: 1936–1971
- Rank: Lieutenant general
- Commands: I Corps; 5th Infantry Division (Mechanized); Programs Evaluation Office; 7th Infantry Regiment
- Conflicts: World War II; Laotian Civil War; Vietnam War
- Awards: Distinguished Service Medal; Silver Star (2); Legion of Merit (2); Soldier's Medal; Bronze Star (3 V Device); Air Medal (12); Army Commendation Medal; Purple Heart; Fourragère; Croix de Guerre (with Palm)

Lieutenant General John Arnold Heintges (9 December 1912 – 31 March 1994) was a United States Army officer who served in World War II, the Laotian Civil War, and the Vietnam War.

== Early life ==
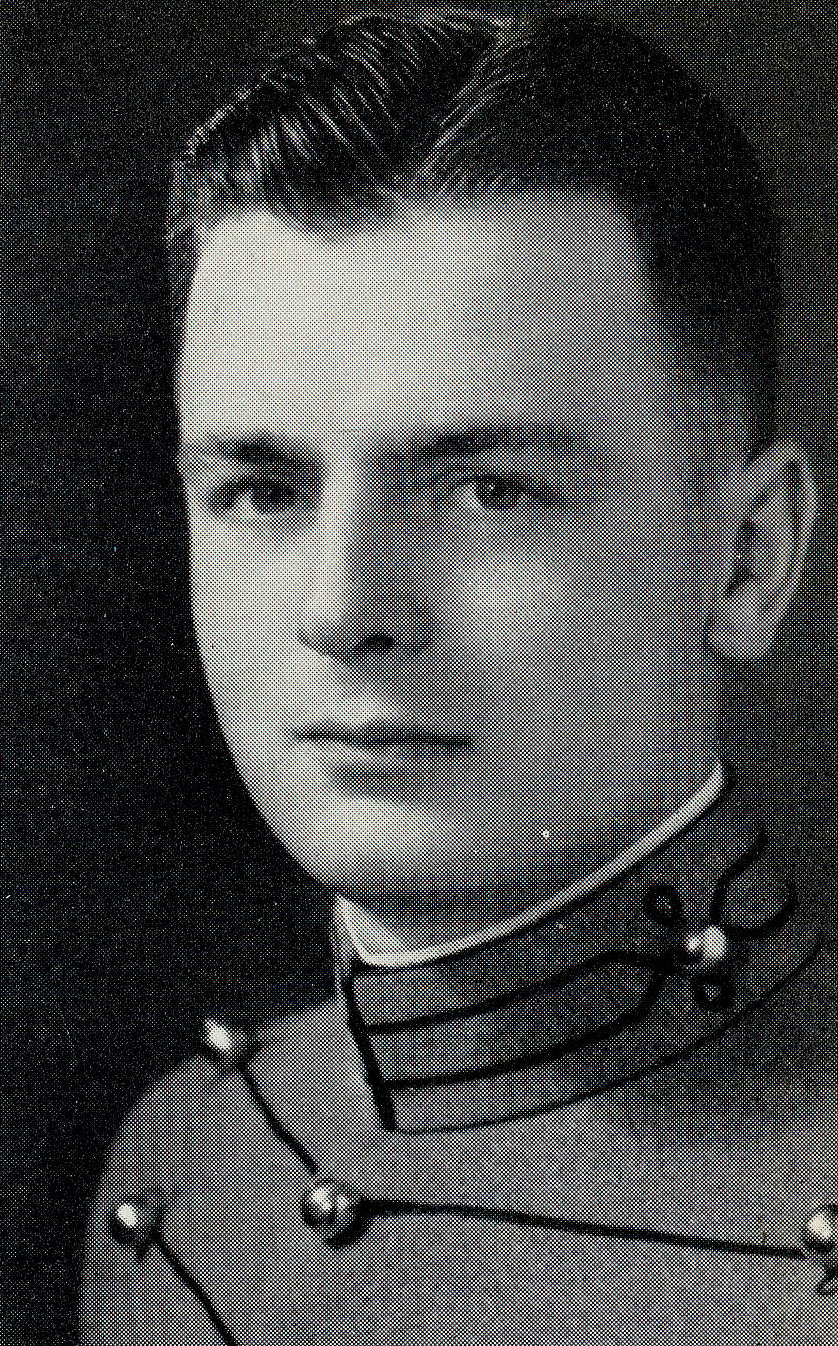
Heintges as a West Point cadet c. 1936

Heintges was born on 9 December 1912 in Koblenz, German Empire. His father was an officer in the Imperial German Army who was killed in action in the Battle of Tannenberg. In 1920 his family emigrated to the United States, sponsored by an uncle who was a major in the Army Medical Corps, and his mother remarried an infantry officer.

== Military career ==
Heintges attended the United States Military Academy and was commissioned as a Second Lieutenant in 1936. He served in the 45th Infantry Regiment Philippine Scouts from 1937 to 1939. He then served as a company commander and regimental Operations Officer (S3) of the 13th Infantry Regiment, 8th Infantry Division at Fort Jackson, South Carolina from 1940 to 1942.

During World War II, Heintges commanded the 3rd Battalion, 7th Infantry Regiment, 3rd Infantry Division and then commanded the 7th Regiment. He saw action in Sicily, Italy, southern France and Germany and his regiment captured Adolf Hitler’s Berghof in Berchtesgaden on 4 May 1945.

On 5 May 2008, a commemorative brass plaque was dedicated on the Obersalzberg recognizing the 3rd Infantry Division's entry into Berchtesgaden on 4 May 1945, the first Allied unit to enter the city. The plaque was the first ever placed to recognize an American unit for its World War II accomplishments in Germany. Veterans Bob Dutil, John Miller, and Ross Brown, all present at the original 1945 flag-raising, raised the flag and unveiled the plaque. Assisting them were Paul Heintges, grandson of 7th Infantry Regiment Commander Colonel John Heintges, and Kathy Brinson, daughter of veteran Joe Kolacz. The ceremony was organized by Captain Monika Stoy and concluded with the first singing of "Dog Face Soldier" on the Obersalzberg.

Following graduation from the United States Army War College, Heintges served in the Army Operations (G3) section. In 1954 he was posted to West Germany as Chief, Army Section, U.S. Military Assistance Group, Germany where he prepared and implemented the training plan for the West German Army. From 1957 to 1958 he served as deputy commander of the Army Infantry Training Center at Fort Dix.

In 1958, Heintges was appointed as commander of Programs Evaluation Office (PEO) in Laos. In order to assume this new role he nominally resigned from the Army and served in Laos as a civilian. During this time he developed the Heintges Plan to improve US assistance to the Royal Lao Army.

From 1961 to 1962, Heintges served as Director of Organization and Training, Office of the Deputy of Chief of Staff for Military Operations in Washington D.C. He served as commander of the 5th Infantry Division (Mechanized) in Fort Carson, Colorado from 29 January 1963 to 15 July 1964. He served as commander of Fort Benning from August 1964 to July 1965.

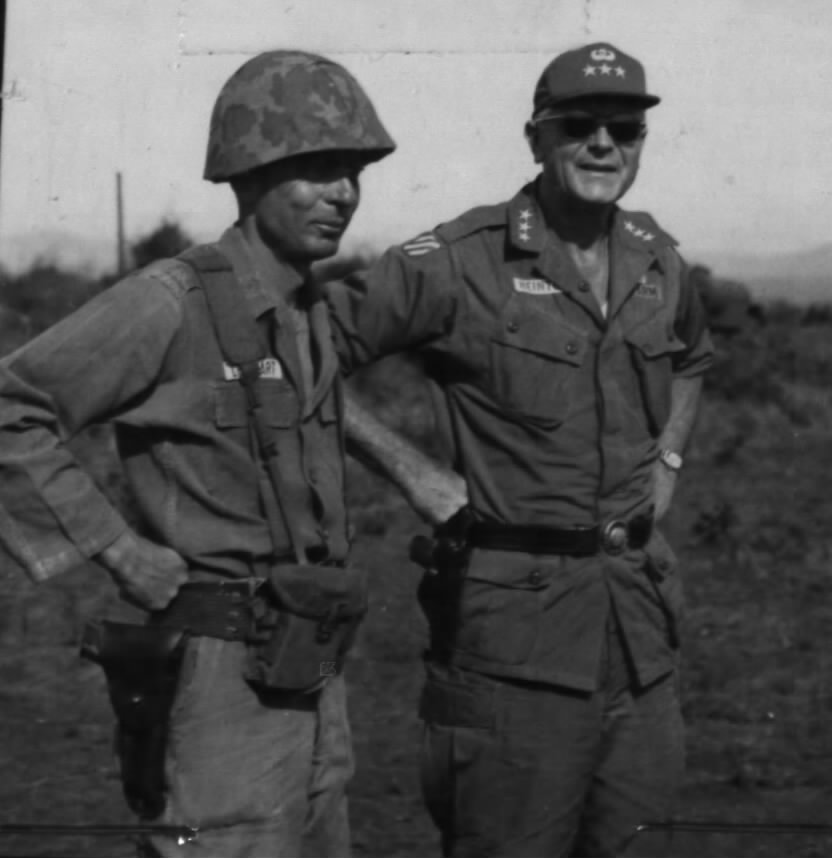
Heintges (right) talks to Major Paul Lenhart, XO, 2nd Battalion, 9th Artillery, 3rd Brigade, 25th Infantry Division, 24 December 1965

Heintges was promoted to Lieutenant General and was assigned as Commanding General, I Corps in South Korea from 1 August to 5 November 1965. In November 1965 he was appointed as Deputy Commander, Military Assistance Command, Vietnam (MACV). In May 1967 he was succeeded in that role by General Creighton Abrams.

Heintges then served as deputy commander, Seventh United States Army. He subsequently served as Deputy Commander in Chief United States Army Europe, in Heidelberg, West Germany, Deputy Commander of the Eighth Army in Korea, and U.S. Representative to the Central Treaty Organization in Ankara, Turkey. He retired from the Army in 1971.

== Later life ==
Heintges died on 31 March 1994 in Colorado Springs, Colorado. He is buried at West Point Cemetery.

== Decorations ==
His decorations included the Distinguished Service Medal, Silver Star (2), Legion of Merit (2), Soldier's Medal, Bronze Star (3 V Device), Air Medal (12), Army Commendation Medal, Purple Heart, Fourragère and Croix de Guerre (with Palm).
