= Brendan O'Connor (soldier) =

American medical sergeant and war hero (born 1960)

MSG Brendan W. O'Connor
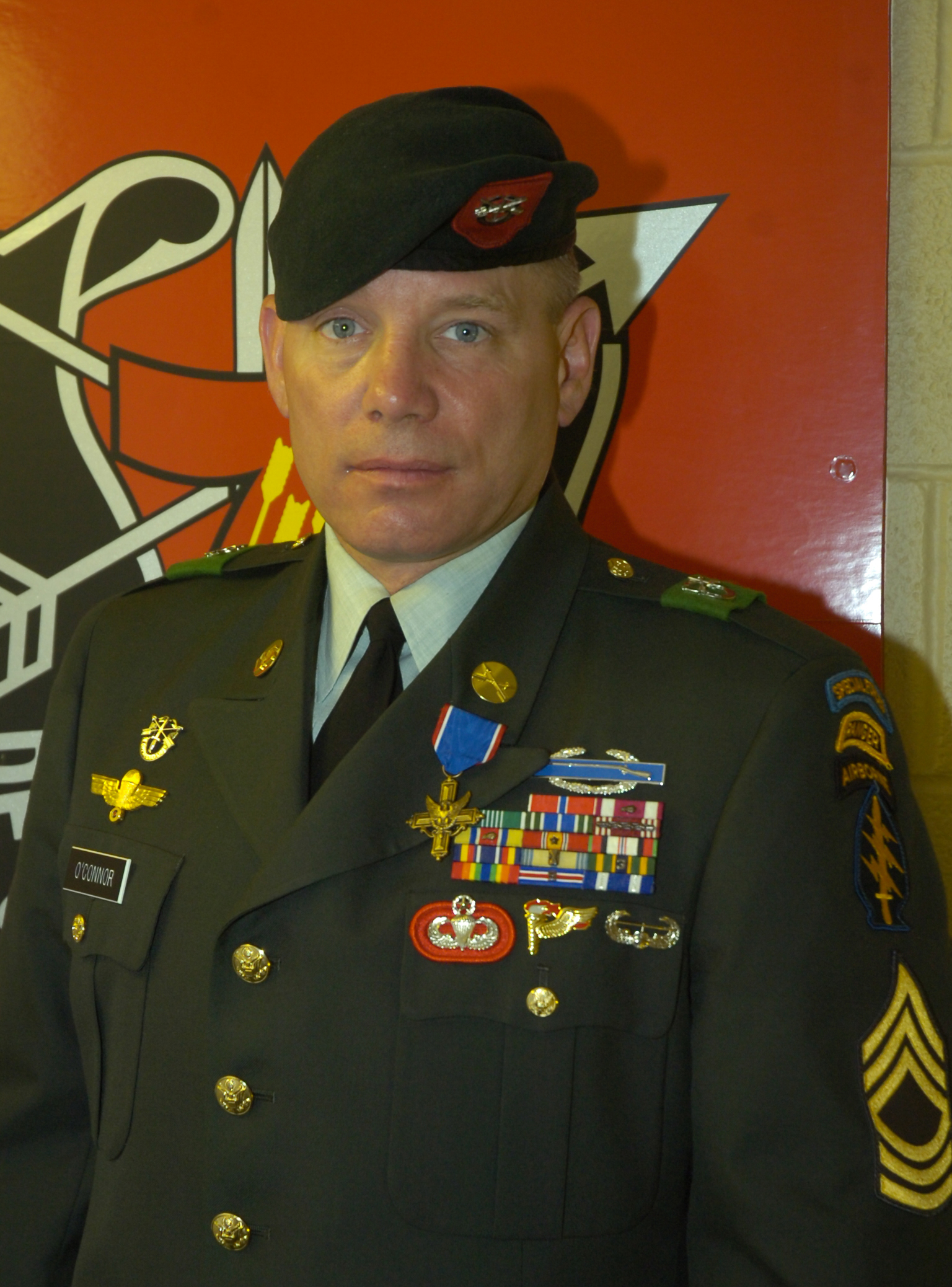
- Born: 1960 (age 65–66); West Point, New York
- Military career
- Allegiance: United States of America
- Branch: United States Army
- Service years: 1980–2016
- Rank: Sergeant Major
- Unit: 7th Special Forces Group
- Conflicts: Operation Enduring Freedom: Operation Kaika
- Awards: Distinguished Service Cross; Bronze Star

Sergeant Major Brendan W. O'Connor (born 1960) is a retired Special Forces medical sergeant in the United States Army. On April 30, 2008, he was awarded the Distinguished Service Cross for his heroic action in Afghanistan. The DSC is the nation's second highest award for valor (after the Medal of Honor) and this was only the second time since the Vietnam War that the medal was awarded.

== Early life ==
Brendan W. O'Connor was born at the United States Military Academy at West Point, New York, the fifth of six children, to LTC Mortimer O'Connor and Elizabeth O'Connor. After his father died in combat in Vietnam, the family settled in Moorestown, New Jersey, where he attended Moorestown High School. Brendan enlisted in the United States Army Reserve (USAR) and enrolled in the Reserve Officers' Training Corps at Valley Forge Military Junior College at Wayne, Pennsylvania, in 1978.

O'Connor was commissioned in 1980 and served as the Executive Officer of Special Forces Operational Detachment Alpha, C/1/11SFG (A) US Army Reserve (USAR). He then moved to gain rifle platoon leader time, serving as both a rifle platoon leader and rifle company commander in C Co/3rd Battalion-18th Infantry, 187th Separate Infantry Brigade USAR. After gaining that experience he returned to lead a Special Forces Operational Detachment Alpha, B/1/11SFG (A) USAR.

In 1994, the Army restructured the Reserve component, deactivating combat arms units. Consequently, O'Connor decided to resign his commission in the Reserves and enlist in the Active Army to become a Special Forces Sergeant. Once back on active duty, he elected to train as a Medical Sergeant, or 18D. He was assigned to the 7th Special Forces Group as a team member in Operational Detachment Alpha, composed of twelve soldiers. In 2005, he deployed to Afghanistan as the Senior Medical Sergeant of Operational Detachment Alpha (ODA) 765, part of the 7th Special Forces Group. Captain Shef Ford commanded ODA 765. MSG Tom Maholic served as the ODA Team Sergeant.

== Heroic action ==
From June 22–25, 2006, O'Connor and his Special Forces Operational Detachment, along with a company of Afghan National Army soldiers, conducted an operation near the Panjawi District Center in southern Afghanistan to seize or kill a significant Taliban leader. After clearing the initial target objective and the suspected location of the Taliban leader, the team established a patrol base in the village. The unit then began conducting small-unit patrolling to further search the area.

Over the next twenty-eight hours, per operational reporting from the unit, the Taliban conducted two significant attacks on the patrol base. In both instances, a combination of patrol base defense and coalition air support forced the Taliban to withdraw with casualties. After the second Taliban attack, Captain Ford and MSG Maholic sensed an opportunity to counter-attack. So, Maholic led a force of 25 troops outside the patrol base to engage Taliban elements.

Approximately one hour into this action, the Maholic's patrol assaulted and seized a compound occupied by the Taliban. To conduct the assault, the patrol split into three elements: an assault element and two support-by-fire teams. After a successful assault by Maholic's patrol, a major firefight developed. Taliban forces attacked the compound and managed to isolate one of the two support-by-fire teams as it moved to the compound to rejoin the rest of the patrol. While moving to join the others in their patrol, two U.S. soldiers were wounded and their element, including Afghan soldiers, was cut off.

Back at the Patrol Base, Captain Ford immediately ordered O'Connor to lead a Quick Reaction Force (QRF) to reach the wounded, bring them back to the forward compound with MSG Maholic, and ultimately return to the Patrol Base. His QRF left the Patrol Base only to return seven hours later after heroic actions. O'Connor first led the QRF team to the forward compound, coordinating with Maholic. O'Connor's team engaged Taliban personnel en route.

Having coordinated with Maholic, O'Connor then began another movement under fire with the QRF towards the wounded soldiers and the isolated element. In this phase, O'Connor acted with great courage, stripping his body armor and moving alone. He crawled across a 90-meter patch of ground being fired on by Taliban machine guns. He scaled a wall and entered a vineyard, searching for the two soldiers and encountering Taliban fighters. He located the two wounded soldiers, who were pinned down with an Afghan interpreter who had stayed to protect them. O'Connor organized the movement under fire to a safer location to administer aid.

As context for the award, the situation with the wounded had been dire. The Afghan translator with them radioed for permission to kill the two wounded soldiers and himself to prevent the Taliban from capturing, then torturing, mutilating, and executing them.

Further, when O'Connor crawled across the gap between the wall and the Pump House, machine gun bullets passed close enough to cut down the grass around him. Eventually reaching the wounded, O'Connor gave them [first aid], then moved them to a more secure position, all while being under fire. After Team Sergeant Maholic was killed, O'Connor took over leadership of the team at the forward position.

Captain Ford, the Detachment Commander, summarized it this way, O'Connor "was going to do anything and everything he could do to save them. He's a true hero."

Covered by a United States Air Force plane, the team was able to withdraw to the Patrol Base, rejoining Captain Ford and the rest of the assault force that undertook this two-day operation. After consolidating and organizing, Captain Ford led the force back to Fire Base Ghecko, where the entire operation had begun over two days earlier. The team suffered two dead and one seriously wounded but had killed over 120 Taliban fighters.

In a ceremony at Fort Bragg, O'Connor was awarded the Distinguished Service Cross. Three other members of this Special Forces team were awarded the Silver Star. MSG Tom Maholic (posthumously), Sergeant First Class Hernandez, and the Detachment Commander, Major Shef Ford.

== Awards and decorations ==
=== Distinguished Service Cross ===

Brendan W. O'Connor

Service: Army
Organization: (ODA-765), Company A, 2nd Battalion, 7th Special Forces Group, 1st Special Forces Command (Airborne)
Division: Combined Joint Special Operations Task Force-Afghanistan

Citation:

The President of the United States of America, authorized by Act of Congress, July 9, 1918 (amended by act of July 25, 1963), takes pleasure in presenting the Distinguished Service Cross to Master Sergeant Brendan W. O'Connor, United States Army, for extraordinary heroism in combat as the Senior Medical Sergeant for Special Forces Operational Detachment Alpha 765 (ODA-765), Company A, 2d Battalion, 7th Special Forces Group (Airborne), in support of Operation ENDURING FREEDOM, in Panjawal District, Kandahar Province, Afghanistan. On 24 June 2006, while conducting Operation KAIKI, Sergeant O'Connor led a quick-reaction force to reinforce a surrounded patrol and rescue two wounded comrades. He maneuvered his force through Taliban positions and crawled alone and unprotected, under enemy machinegun fire to reach the wounded soldiers. He provided medical care while exposed to heavy volumes of Taliban fire, then carried one of the wounded 150 meters across open ground to an area of temporary cover. Sergeant First Class O'Connor then climbed over a wall three times, in plain view of the enemy, to assist the wounded soldiers in seeking cover while bullets pounded the structure around them. Sergeant First Class O'Connor assumed duties as the detachment operations sergeant and led the consolidation of three friendly elements, each surrounded, isolated, and receiving fire from all directions. Sergeant First Class O'Connor's distinctive accomplishments and dedication to his comrades are in keeping with the finest traditions of military service and reflect great credit upon himself, the Special Operations Command Central, and the United States Army.

=== Commendations ===

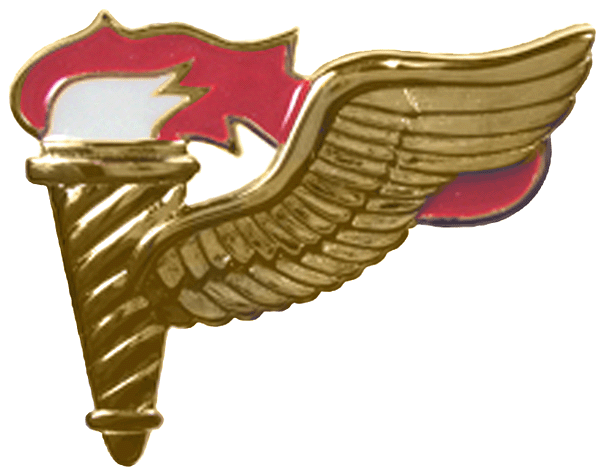

Badge	Combat Infantryman Badge		
1st row	Distinguished Service Cross		Bronze Star
2nd row	Meritorious Service Medal with 1 Oak leaf cluster	Army Commendation Medal	Army Achievement Medal
3rd row	Army Good Conduct Medal with silver clasp and 2 loops	Army Reserve Components Achievement Medal with 1 Oak leaf cluster	National Defense Service Medal with 1 Service star
4th row	Afghanistan Campaign Medal	Global War on Terrorism Expeditionary Medal	Global War on Terrorism Service Medal
5th row	Army Reserve Overseas Training Ribbon with Award numeral 8	Armed Forces Reserve Medal with bronze hourglass device	Non-Commissioned Officer Development Ribbon with Award numeral 4
6th row	Army Service Ribbon	Army Overseas Ribbon	NATO Medal for service with ISAF
Badges	Master Parachutist Badge	Pathfinder Badge	Air Assault Badge
Tabs	Special Forces tab		Ranger Tab

== Family ==
He is married to Margaret Elizabeth (née Garvey); they have three sons and two daughters.
