= Maurice F. Weisner =

United States Navy officer (1917–2006)

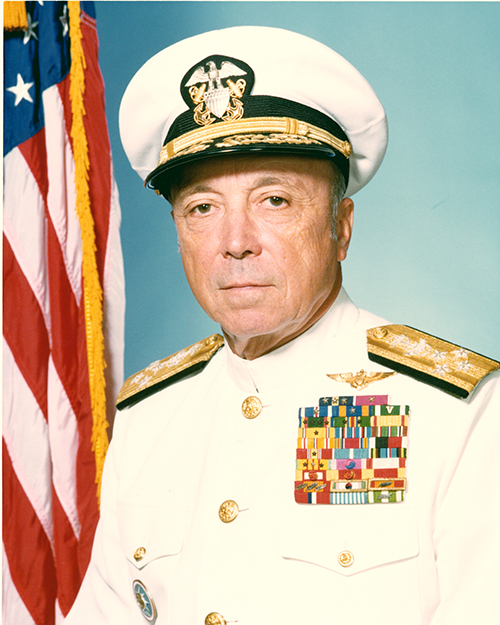
- Admiral Maurice F. Weisner
- Born: November 20, 1917; Knoxville, Tennessee, U.S.
- Died: October 15, 2006 (aged 88); Pensacola, Florida, U.S.
- Burial place: Barrancas National Cemetery
- Military career
- Allegiance: United States
- Branch: United States Navy
- Service years: 1937–1979
- Rank: Admiral
- Commands: United States Pacific Command; United States Pacific Fleet; Vice Chief of Naval Operations; United States Seventh Fleet; Carrier Division One; USS Kitty Hawk; USS Coral Sea
- Conflicts: World War II; Korean War; Vietnam War
- Awards: Defense Distinguished Service Medal (2); Navy Distinguished Service Medal (4); Army Distinguished Service Medal; Air Force Distinguished Service Medal; Legion of Merit (2); Distinguished Flying Cross (2)

Maurice Franklin Weisner (November 20, 1917 – October 15, 2006) was a four-star admiral of the United States Navy who served as Vice Chief of Naval Operations from 1972 to 1973; commander in chief, United States Pacific Fleet from 1973 to 1976; and commander in chief of the United States Pacific Command from 1976 to 1979.

== Naval career ==
Weisner graduated from the United States Naval Academy in 1941 and served aboard USS Wasp (CV-7) as a member of the ship's company until it was sunk in September 1942. He then graduated from flight school, becoming a Naval Aviator in 1943 and returning to combat in the Southwest Pacific until June 1945. He was credited with the sinking of a Japanese destroyer escort during that tour. During a career spanning 38 years, he served in six aircraft squadrons, commanding three, and commanded two ships, including USS Coral Sea, two carrier divisions in the Pacific, and the United States Seventh Fleet.

== Awards and decorations ==
Weisner's awards and decorations include:

Naval Aviator Badge
1st Row	Defense Distinguished Service Medal with one bronze oak leaf cluster		Navy Distinguished Service Medal with three gold award stars
2nd Row	Army Distinguished Service Medal	Air Force Distinguished Service Medal	Legion of Merit with award star
3rd Row	Distinguished Flying Cross with award star	Air Medal with silver award star	Navy and Marine Corps Commendation Medal with Combat V
4th Row	Navy Unit Commendation with four bronze service stars	Navy Meritorious Unit Commendation with two service stars	China Service Medal
5th row	American Defense Service Medal with service star	American Campaign Medal	European-African Middle Eastern Campaign Medal with one service star
6th row	Asiatic-Pacific Campaign Medal with four service stars	World War II Victory Medal	Navy Occupation Service Medal
7th Row	National Defense Service Medal with service star	Korean Service Medal	Armed Forces Expeditionary Medal
8th Row	Vietnam Service Medal with seven service stars	Order of National Security Merit, Tong-Il Medal (Republic of Korea)	Order of the Cloud and Banner, 2nd Class (Republic of China)
9th row	National Order of Vietnam, Commander	National Order of Vietnam, Officer	National Order of Vietnam, Knight
10th row	Vietnam Gallantry Cross with three palms	Korea Presidential Unit Citation	Vietnam Gallantry Cross Unit Citation
11th row	Philippine Liberation Medal	United Nations Korea Medal	Vietnam Campaign Medal
United States Pacific Command Badge

- Foreign decorations from Japan, the Republic of Korea, Republic of Vietnam, Philippine Republic, Kingdom of Thailand and the United Nations.
- As the senior active duty naval aviator, he received the Gray Eagle Award.

== Retirement ==
Weisner retired from the navy in November 1979. In retirement, Weisner presided as president of the Naval Aviation Museum Foundation until 1993. He died in 2006 and was buried in Barrancas National Cemetery.

Military offices
Preceded by Ralph W. Cousins	Vice Chief of Naval Operations; 1972–1973	Succeeded by James L. Holloway III
Preceded by Noel A. M. Gayler	United States Pacific Command; 1976–1979	Succeeded by Robert L. J. Long
