= Operation Kaika =

Military operation in Afghanistan

- Part of the War in Afghanistan (2001–2021)
Date	June 23 – 24, 2006
Location	Near Kandahar, Afghanistan
Result	American-Afghan victory: Taliban retreat; Heavy Afghan police casualties

Belligerents
Coalition: United States; Islamic Republic of Afghanistan	(Afghanistan) Taliban

Commanders and leaders
(United States) Captain Sheffield F. Ford III	Unknown

Strength
(United States) 17 (Afghanistan) 48	8 insurgents (AWD); 200 insurgents (US Mil.)

Casualties and losses
(United States) 2 killed (Afghanistan) 3 killed	120 killed

Operation Kaika was a joint operation between American Special Forces and Afghan National Army soldiers, to establish a control base as part of the larger Operation Mountain Thrust, and clear Taliban fighters from three villages about 12 miles southwest of Kandahar, Afghanistan in June 2006.

The battle took an unexpected twist when Afghan forces "laid siege" to the American-supported troops, "convinced they had the Americans cornered", the militants spearheaded three large assaults over the course of three days. It became "one of the most sustained battles" of the war.

== Opening ==
As the American-led force of 9 Special Forces soldiers, 8 regular American soldiers and 48 Afghan soldiers approached the villages to be "swept" for insurgents, they were surprised to find the Afghan militants had "sophisticated communications" and heavy weaponry awaiting their arrival - and were quickly surrounded.

Pinned down in the city, the Americans organised a team of 20 Afghan soldiers and several Special Forces to try to penetrate the surrounding teams of militants and make it through to the village's graveyard, where it was believed the militants were being commanded. The militants allowed the small splinter group to "escape" to the graveyard, where they discovered it had been a trap and they were surrounded.

American Sgt. Matthew Binney was wounded by machine gun fire in the head, shoulder and arm. Sgt. Joe Fuerst was mortally wounded by the shock of a rocket propelled grenade and Master Sgt. Thomas Maholic was killed by a single gunshot wound in the head. The Afghan interpreter with them, dubbed "Jacob", then heard the militants yell out to him, explaining that they wanted to capture the Americans alive, and would allow him to leave unharmed. "Jacob" then radioed back to Ford's crew who were still pinned down in the village and requested permission to kill the two wounded Americans to prevent their capture. He was denied that request, and Ford promised him that help was en route. Jacob fought off the Taliban until O’Conner removed his body armor and low crawled out to Jacob’s position and together they recovered wounded Binney and Fuerst’s body, back to the compound.

American airstrikes, including close support by AH-64 Apache helicopters, allowed the US and Afghan troops to escape while inflicting heavy losses on the Taliban.

Two US Army soldiers, and approximately 120 insurgents were killed.

== Aftermath ==
Captain Sheffield Ford, Master Sgt. Thomas Maholic (posthumously), Sgt. Matthew Binney and Sgt. 1st Class Abram Hernandez were awarded the Silver Star for their actions in the battle, while Sgt. 1st Class Tony Pastor, Sgt. 1st Class Ebbon Brown, Staff Sgt. Ariel Aponte, Staff Sgt. Charles Lyles and Staff Sgt. Michael Sanabria were awarded the Bronze Star with "V" device for valor. Master Sgt. Brendan O'Connor, was later awarded the Distinguished Service Cross by the United States government for his actions during the operation.
