= Barrancas National Cemetery =

Historic veterans cemetery in Escambia County, Florida

- U.S. National Register of Historic Places
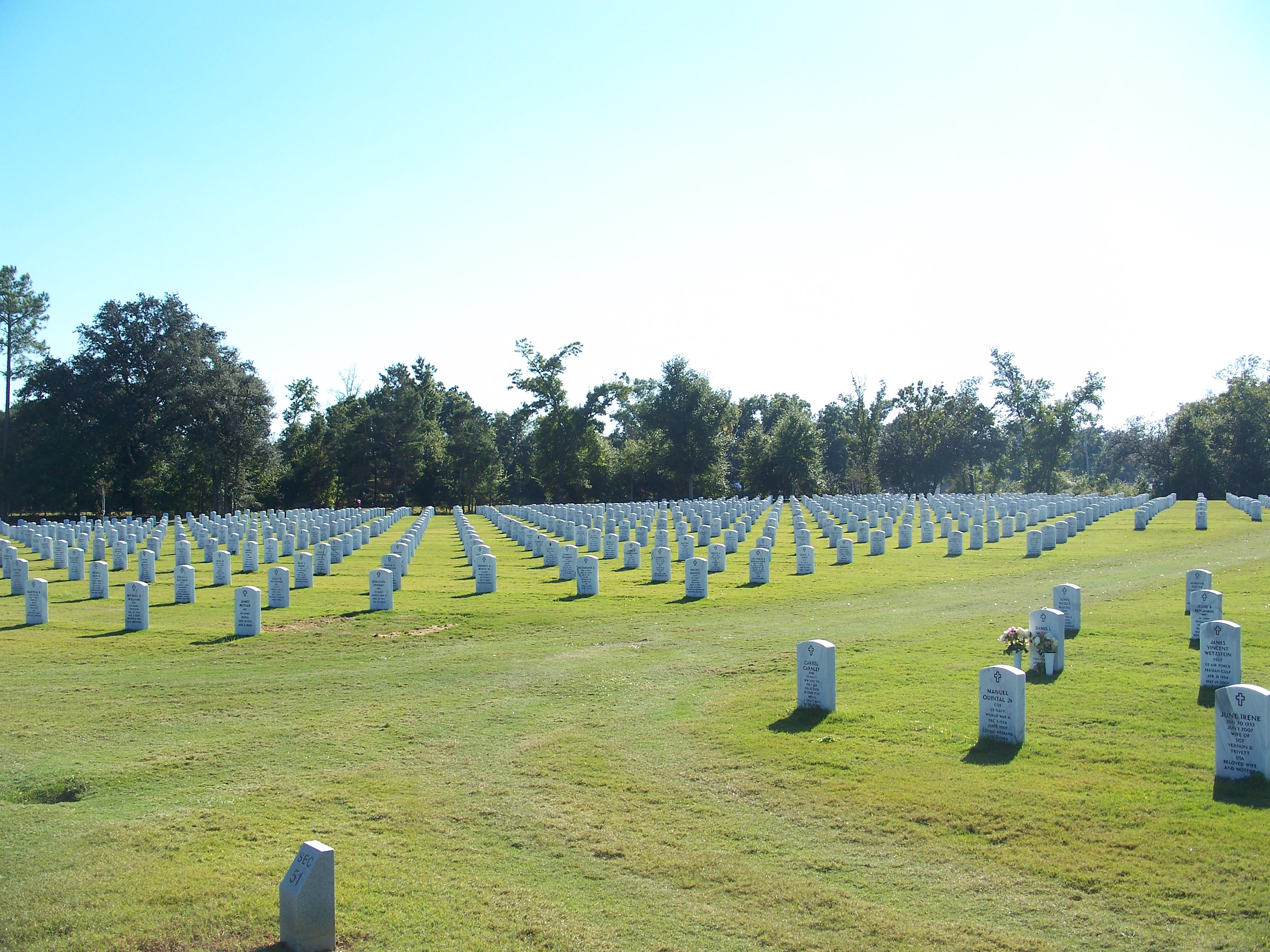

- Location within Florida Location within the United States
- Location: Pensacola, Florida, United States
- Coordinates: 30°21′18″N 87°17′09″W
- Area: 45.1 acres (18.3 ha)
- MPS: Civil War Era National Cemeteries MPS
- NRHP reference No.: 98000083
- Added to NRHP: February 12, 1998

Barrancas National Cemetery is a United States National Cemetery located at Naval Air Station Pensacola, in the city of Pensacola, Florida. It encompasses 94.9 acres (38.4 ha), and as of 2021 had over 50,000 interments.

== History ==
The area has been used as a burial ground since the construction of Fort Barrancas. In 1838 it was established as a United States Navy cemetery. During the Civil War, Pensacola was hotly contested, as it was considered to be the best port for access to the Gulf of Mexico. Numerous soldiers on both sides were interred in the cemetery after falling in combat, or dying in nearby hospitals. After the war, in 1868, Barrancas was officially made a National Cemetery and many other nearby makeshift burial grounds were disinterred and relocated to Barrancas. In each year, 1944, 1950, 1986, and 1990, more area was transferred from NAS Pensacola to expand the facilities for the cemetery.

== Notable monuments ==
Barrancas National Cemetery has a monument honoring those soldiers who died from yellow fever. It was erected in 1884 by the Marine Guard of the Pensacola Navy Yard.

== Notable interments ==
- Medal of Honor recipients
  - Colonel George E. "Bud" Day, USAF, former POW and recipient for action in the Vietnam War
  - Commander Clyde Everett Lassen, USN, recipient for action in the Vietnam War
  - Major Stephen W. Pless, USMC, recipient for action in the Vietnam War
  - Staff Sergeant Clifford Chester Sims, USA, recipient for action in the Vietnam War
- Others
  - Vice admiral Dick H. Guinn, USN, World War II veteran and Navy Cross recipient. Former Chief of Naval Personnel
  - Lieutenant General Robert P. Keller, USMC, Marine Aviator during World War II, Korea and Vietnam
  - General Joe W. Kelly, USAF, former commander of Military Air Transport Service from 1960 to 1964
  - Major General William L. McKittrick, USMC, Marine Aviator during World War II
  - Colonel Arthur D. Simons, USA, Special Forces commander and leader of the Sơn Tây raid
  - Benny Spellman (1931–2011), US Army Korean War veteran and R&B singer
  - Admiral Maurice F. Weisner, USN, former commander of US Pacific Command from 1976 to 1979
  - Daniel Phineas Woodbury (1812–1864), Civil War Union Major General
  - Ga-Ah, one of the many wives of the Apache Indian Geronimo, who died of Bright's disease while being held captive

The cemetery also holds 17 casualties of the Second Seminole War and 10 British aviators (six Royal Navy, four Royal Air Force) killed during training at the Naval Air Station during World War II.

== See also ==
- United States Department of Veterans Affairs
