= Project Hotfoot (Laos) =

USA military training mission of the Royal Lao Army

- Part of Laotian Civil War, Vietnam War, and the Cold War in Indochina
- Type: Military training mission
- Location: Kingdom of Laos
- Planned by: John A. Heintges, CINCPAC
- Commanded by: Donald Blackburn, Arthur D. Simons, Andrew J. Boyle
- Objective: Train soldiers in the Royal Lao Army, cooperate with French military training teams
- Date: 22 January 1959 – 19 April 1961
- Executed by: United States Army Special Forces Mobile Training Teams, US control team, French training teams
- Outcome: Multiple units trained; project develops into Operation White Star; Kong Le prepares to lead a military coup against the Kingdom of Laos
- Casualties: 5 killed

Project Hotfoot (also known as Operation Hotfoot, originally known as Operation Ambidextrous) was a secretive military training mission from the United States in support of the Kingdom of Laos. It ran from 22 January 1959 through 19 April 1961. Working in civilian clothing in conjunction with a French military mission, it concentrated on technical training of the Royal Lao Army.

== Background ==
In March 1945, in the waning days of World War II, the Japanese occupiers of the Kingdom of Laos forced Lao independence from France. However, the French reasserted themselves in French Indochina after war's end. During the ensuing First Indochina War, the Vietnamese Communist revolutionists invaded Laos in March 1953. After occupying large portions of Phongsaly, Houaphanh Province, and mountainous terrain that would become the Ho Chi Minh Trail, the Vietminh moved south to the Plain of Jars and in a column menacing Luang Prabang. The Plain of Jars offered the French forces the advantages of attacking the Viet Minh in the open with artillery and air strikes; that assault was halted. The column near Luang Prabang was also stopped when it was ambushed. A third Vietminh force captured Thakhek on 25 December 1953, cutting Laos in two. This force would not be evicted until February 1954.

As France departed Laos after losing the First Indochina War, the United States moved in to support the Royal Lao Government. In the wake of the 1954 Geneva Conference and its treaties, the U.S. embassy in Vientiane established the Programs Evaluation Office to oversee military aid to Laos. It was established on 13 December 1954. Purportedly staffed by civilians, its personnel were U.S. military retirees, veterans, and reservists. Because the PEO personnel were not serving on active military duty, they were not in violation of the terms of the Geneva treaty.

== The Heintges Plan ==
In September 1958, Brigadier General John A. Heintges left the U.S. Army. In November, he flew to Laos to evaluate the Programs Evaluation Office, with a mandate to take charge of it. Heintges concluded that the staff of the PEO was too small, and seemed intent only on delivering equipment. There was a suspicion that some military aid to Laos was diverted for French use in the Algerian War.

Returning to Washington, DC, Heintges lobbied for a larger PEO. He pointed to the sad shape of the Royal Lao Army as proof of need of U.S. military materiel and training. He was granted an increase in staff. Also, on 22 January 1959, CINCPAC levied a requirement for 12 Special Forces Mobile Training Teams of eight men each; they were slated to start six months temporary duty in Laos on 1 April. The operation was kept secret from the American public and, in fact, U.S. commandos that were sent to Laos were given written orders stating they were going to Vietnam. A cover story was arranged; the U.S. mission was purportedly from the United States Coast and Geodetic Survey. U.S. commandos were disguised as civilians and carried civilian identifications. General Donald Blackburn was charged with command of the mission. He prepared his men by requiring tutoring in both French and Lao, and insisting that all hands read the nonfiction book Street Without Joy, as well as the novel The Ugly American, before departure.

However, negotiations with the French government delayed things. It was finally decided that the French instructors in Laos under the Geneva treaty would continue to teach tactics, while the American trainers would teach technical subjects. On 24 July 1959, the Mobile Training Teams arrived in Vientiane. Augmented by a control team 11 strong, the force was dubbed Project Hotfoot (Operation Hotfoot for security purposes); it was also known by the official but little-used title of the Laos Training Advisory Group. They were to work for the PEO as a training arm, teaching Lao soldiers the use of the M1 Garand, Browning Automatic Rifle, M1 Carbine, bazooka, M18 recoilless rifle, and both 60mm and 81mm mortars. The Green Berets were commanded on site by Lieutenant Colonel Arthur D. Simons.

== Hotfoot at work ==
Having been delayed in arrival, the Hotfoot contingent now found itself balked by Lao internal politics. While waiting for the local political situation to clear, the Hotfoot specialists hunkered in training centers at Luang Prabang, Savannakhet, Pakse, and Vientiane. They surveyed the Royal Lao Army as they waited. By the time they were free to begin training at the beginning of September 1959, they had an excellent idea of the retraining task before them. Nine of the Mobile Training Teams were matched with French training teams at regional training camps. Three teams were assigned to build a new training facility northeast of Vientiane on Route 13 at Kilometer 22. This center would be an all-Hotfoot operation, with no French involved. Nearby, at Kilometer 17, they built a ranger training center.

On 25 November 1959, one of the Green Beret teams moved from Savannakhet into Military Region 2. They co-located at Khang Khay with a French training team and began building a clinic, rifle range, and demolitions practice area. As 1960 began, training of both regular and irregular military troops began. The latter were Auto Defense Choc guerrillas.

The original Hotfoot contingent rotated out of Laos in February 1960, to be replaced by Hotfoot II. The new crew began ranger training for the RLA's 1 Bataillon Parachutistes (1st Paratroop Battalion) and 2 Bataillon Parachutistes (2d Paratroop Battalion). As Hotfoot II left Laos on 29 June 1960, to be replaced by Hotfoot III, 2nd BP began erecting a new battalion encampment for itself at KM 22. On 9 August, the 2nd BP commander, Kong Le, would stage his coup from there, commanding his loyal paratroopers.

== Hotfoot becomes White Star ==
Under incoming American President John F. Kennedy, Hotfoot was rapidly expanded. Andrew Jackson Boyle had just been appointed as chief of the PEO; on 31 January 1961, just after the 19 January inauguration, he requested nine more training teams. His rationale was that every existing or forming battalion in the Royal Lao Army should have an American advisor. The Pentagon signed off on the request, with three packets each consisting of three teams staggering their arrivals in Laos from March through May 1961. The Operation Hotfoot moniker changed to Operation Monkhood.

On 19 April 1961, President Kennedy made a symbolic gesture in allowing the PEO to publicly become a MAAG; PEO members were allowed to don uniforms and resume usual public military courtesies. At the same time, the Hotfoot V teams were also renamed as Operation White Star. Operation Hotfoot had suffered five killed in action during its duties. When Lieutenant Colonel Simons later organized the Raid on Son Tay, he would call upon men who served with him in Laos, such as Richard Meadows and Elliott P. Sydnor, Jr.
