= 8th Special Forces Group (United States) =

- 8th Special Forces Group (Airborne) Beret Flash
- Active: 1963–1972
- Country: United States of America
- Branch: United States Army
- Type: Special operations force
- Role: Counter-Insurgency training for Latin American armies
- Part of: 1st Special Forces Command
- Garrison/HQ: Fort Gulick
- Nicknames: Green Berets, Quiet Professionals, Soldier-Diplomats, Snake Eaters, Bearded Bastards
- Mottos: Lo Que Sea, Cuando Sea, Donde Sea

Insignia
- 8th SFG(A) recognition bar, worn by non-Special Forces-qualified soldiers, in lieu of a beret flash

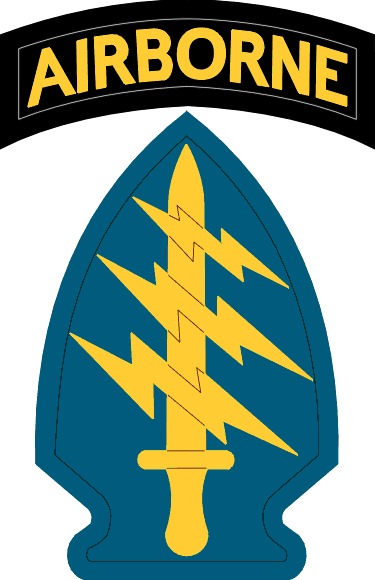
- 1st Special Forces Command (Airborne) shoulder sleeve insignia, worn by all 1st SFC(A) units

Soldiers from the 8th SFG(A) conduct HALO training with new Special Forces students at Fort Gulick, circa 1966

8th SFG(A) conduct counterinsurgency training in Bolivia, circa 1966

The 8th Special Forces Group of the United States Army was established in 1963 at Fort Gulick, Panama Canal Zone. The primary mission of the 8th Special Forces Group (Airborne) [(SFG (A)] was counter-insurgency training for the armies of Latin America. Some training was performed under the sponsorship of the School of the Americas, also located at Fort Gulick.

In May 1962, the advance party from Company D, 7th SFG (A) departed from Ft. Bragg, NC to Fort Gulick, Panama, at that time in the Panama Canal Zone, to establish the 8th SFG (A). Three months later, in August 1962, Major Melvin J. Sowards, Commander of Company D, 7th SFG (A) moved the main body of the company to the Canal Zone. They would be followed by augmentation detachments. Upon their arrival, the basic organization of the Special Action Force (SAF) was completed and Lieutenant Colonel Sawyer assumed command. The legendary Lieutenant Colonel Arthur D. Simons, a.k.a. "Bull", then took command of Company D, 7th SFG (A) 18 January 1963 and LTC Sawyer became the Executive Officer. On 12 April 1963, under the command of LTC Simons, the SAF elements of the 7th SFG (A) were officially redesignated, as authorized by the Department of the Army and the 8th SFG (A) was activated.

== Organization ==
The 8th's full designation was 8th Special Forces Group (ABN), Special Action Force (SAF), Latin America. The 8th was the US Army's only full SAF. In addition to the two line Special Forces companies, the SAF included the 9th Psychological Warfare Company (ABN), predecessor unit of the US Army's present-day 9th Psychological Operations Battalion (ABN), the 146th Engineer, 255th Medical, 550th Military Police, 3rd Civil Affairs (CA), 610th Military Intelligence, and the 401st Army Security Agency (ASA) Special Operations detachments.

Special Forces at this time didn't use designators like "battalion". A Special Forces company (which later became a battalion) was commanded by a Lt. Colonel and was designated as a "C" team. The 8th had 2 "C" teams. Each "C" team had 3 "B" teams and each "B" team had 5 "A" teams. The 8th SAF also operated the NCO Academy, Airborne School and Underwater Operations School for the United States Army South (USARSO). They also provided support for the Jungle Warfare School at Fort Sherman, later renamed the Jungle Operations Training Center.

== Subordinate units ==
Company A of the 8th Group was tasked with developing and maintaining a High Altitude Low Opening (HALO) team, Detachment A-13, that was prepared to make covert free-fall entry to denied airspace by jumping from altitudes in excess of 30,000 feet. The team trained at the abandoned airstrip at Rio Hato, Panama, and conducted the first HALO school outside of Ft. Bragg, North Carolina, at Fort Gulick, Canal Zone, in the late 1960s and 70s. The HALO team also had a good-will mission as the "Jumping Ambassadors" and conducted exhibition parachute jumps at carnivals, festivals and other public events throughout Latin America.

== Notable operations ==
A Mobile Training Team (MTT) from the 8th Special Forces Group trained and advised the Bolivian Ranger Battalion that captured and killed Che Guevara in the fall of 1967.

Prior to that time, MTTs from the 8th Special Forces Group trained counter-insurgent units in Venezuela, Colombia, and Ecuador that killed three of Che Guevara's best friends and Lieutenants that he had personally dispatched to those three nations to foment revolutions.

MTTs were sent to Argentina from 1962 to 1970 to provide training in recoilless rifles to their army, road construction/maintenance, logistics, as well as English language skills.

MTTs from the 8th Special Forces Group also assisted the Venezuelan Army in the construction of their jump school. They trained the first students and the cadre for following classes. They also assisted the Dominican Republic by training a Dominican Army mountain battalion in counter guerrilla warfare.

At the US Army Airborne School at Ft. Sherman in the US Canal Zone, a team of the 8th Special Forces Group trained Guatemalan airborne personnel.

== Deactivation and Reorganization ==
Colonel Robert J. "Bobby Joe" Pinkerton (21 August 1927 – 15 October 2002) was the final commanding officer of the 8th SFG (A) from 20 August 1971 to its deactivation on 30 June 1972. He arrived in Panama directly from Vietnam faced with the task of deactivating the 8th Special Action Force for Latin America and the 8th Special Forces Group (Airborne). Upon retiring the colors of the 8th Special Forces Group (Airborne) he became the commander of the Security Assistance Force and became dual hatted as the commander of the Atlantic Garrison.

On 30 June 1972, Lieutenant Colonel Tom Owens was the commander of Company A, 8th Special Forces Group (Airborne) and became the first commander of the 3rd Battalion, 7th Special Forces Group (Airborne). When he retired his company guidon, he exchanged it for the colors of this Special Forces battalion. Additionally, he assumed the responsibilities of carrying on the traditions of his 8th Special Forces Group (Airborne) predecessors and set the standard for other commanders to follow.

One of the reasons for the deactivation of the 8th SFG (A) in 1972 was the draw down during the waning years of the Vietnam build up. At the same time, Special Forces was reorganizing into Battalions rather than Companies. It made sense that the 8th became the 3rd Battalion of the 7th SFG(A), because it was an element of the 7th that began the set up of the 8th SFG (A) in 1962.

Upon reorganization the 3rd BN 7th SFG (A) consisted of 3 SF line companies, "B" Teams with 5 "A" Teams and a Headquarters Company which provided support including a rigger detachment.

A-5 (A Company) was designated as the Airborne School Team, A-10 (B Company) was the HALO Team and "The Jumping Ambassadors" and A-15 (C Company) was the SCUBA Team.

== See also ==
- 7th Special Forces Group (United States)
