= Arthur D. Simons =

United States Army Special Forces colonel

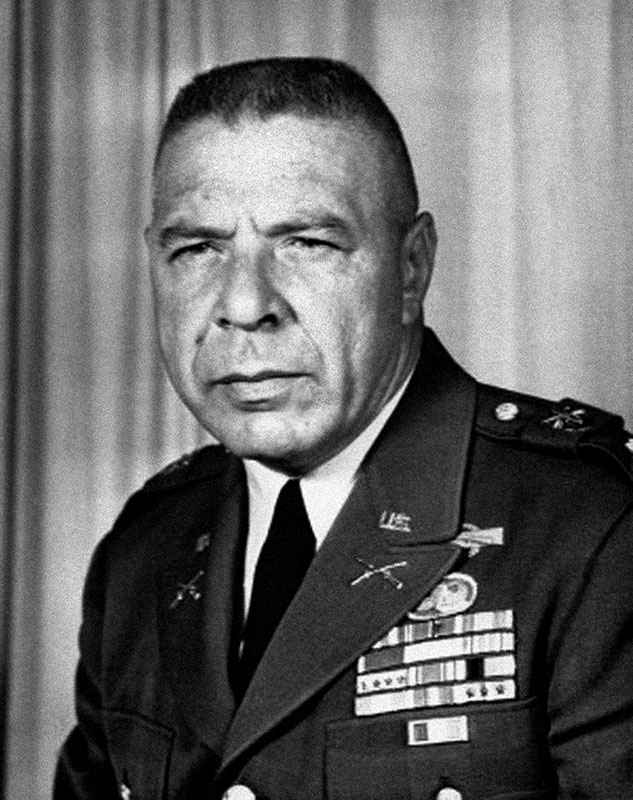
- Born: Arthur David Simons; June 28, 1918; New York City, New York, U.S.
- Died: May 21, 1979 (aged 60); Red Bay, Florida, U.S.
- Burial place: Barrancas National Cemetery, Pensacola, Florida
- Military career
- Allegiance: United States of America
- Branch: United States Army
- Service years: 1941–1971
- Rank: Colonel
- Nickname: "Bull"
- Units: 98th Field Artillery Battalion; United States Army Special Forces: 7th Special Forces Group; MACV-SOG
- Commands: 8th Special Forces Group
- Conflicts: World War II; Korean War; Vietnam War
- Awards: Distinguished Service Cross; Silver Star; Legion of Merit (5); Bronze Star Medal; Purple Heart; Meritorious Service Medal; Air Medal

Arthur D. "Bull" Simons (June 28, 1918 – May 21, 1979) was a United States Army Special Forces colonel best known for leading the Sơn Tây raid, an attempted rescue of U.S. prisoners of war during the Vietnam War from a North Vietnamese prison at Sơn Tây. He also led the successful 1979 rescue of two employees of Electronic Data Systems from prison in Iran.

Although serving 30 years as an officer spanning three wars, Simons was deemed not to fit the "career mold" for a general officer and did not rise above the rank of colonel. An Air Force officer who helped plan and execute the Sơn Tây raid wrote of Simons: "He was not out to make a name for himself; he was there to do his duty. He did not attend all the professional advancement schools and did not cultivate any sponsors for his career. He just answered every call because it was the right thing for an American soldier to do."

== Early life ==
Arthur David Simons was born in New York City, moving to Missouri in his youth. His family was Jewish. He attended the University of Missouri-Columbia and majored in journalism, entering the ROTC program there in 1937. After graduation, he married his girlfriend, Lucille, eventually having two boys, Bruce and Harry. He remained married to Lucille for 37 years until her death on March 16, 1978.

== Army service ==
Simons was commissioned a second lieutenant in the Field Artillery Branch in 1941, and was initially assigned to the 98th Field Artillery Battalion, a part of one of the Army's pack mule units. In his first assignment as a platoon leader, he as the new lieutenant was so quiet and reserved (he later said he wanted to learn from the sergeants that seemed to know their business well) that one of his sergeants came to believe that Simons was a mute. The unit was dispatched to Australia, but immediately diverted to New Guinea in the early stages of World War II, and Simons thrived in the harsh jungle environment. He was soon promoted to the rank of Captain and served as a Battery Commander in the battalion from 1942 to 1943. The mules did not prove suitable in the jungle, and the unit was dissolved in 1943. Simons took his battery to the newly forming Ranger Battalion that would come out of the dissolution of his old unit. He soon became the commander of "B" (Baker) Company and later the battalion Executive Officer (XO) of the 6th Ranger Battalion under Lieutenant Colonel Henry Mucci. Simons participated in several hazardous landings with the Rangers in the Pacific. He led a team of engineers and Navy personnel tasked to de-mine the Leyte channel before the invasion of the island began in earnest. On Luzon in the Philippines, he participated in the Raid at Cabanatuan that rescued approximately 500 POWs who were mostly survivors of the Bataan Death March. For his actions in the raid he was awarded the Silver Star. He quickly rose to the rank of Major and continued to prove his worth as a combat leader. At the conclusion of World War II, Major Simons left the active Army for five years.

Simons was recalled to active duty in 1951 to serve as an infantry instructor and Ranger trainer in the Amphibious and Jungle Training camp at Eglin Air Force Base, Florida. Other assignments included a year as a Public Information Officer (PIO, now "Public Affairs Officer" or PAO) at Fort Bragg, North Carolina, a job that he despised: He held a low opinion of the media, one that would prove itself in later years and assignments. "The press hasn't done very well for the American soldier," he would later remark. Simons also completed tours with the Military Assistance Advisory Group, Turkey and XVIII Airborne Corps before joining the 7th Special Forces Group in 1958. In 1960 he served as Deputy Commander/Chief of Staff of the U.S. Army Special Warfare Center. Promoted to lieutenant colonel in 1961, he commanded the 107-man Operation White Star Mobile Training Team in Laos from 1961 to 1962 and was the first commander of the 8th Special Forces Group, Panama from 1962 to 1964. From Panama, he was assigned to the Military Assistance Command, Vietnam – Studies and Observations Group (MACV-SOG), which conducted numerous behind-the-line missions in Southeast Asia.

In 1970, Simons was hand-picked to command the army component of Operation Ivory Coast, a joint special operations effort to rescue American prisoners of war from the Sơn Tây prison in North Vietnam. While it did not rescue any prisoners (the camp was still used as a military installation but the prisoners had been removed a few months earlier), the otherwise highly-successful operation did force North Vietnam to consolidate all of the prisoners into a few central compounds in Hanoi, resulting in a boost in the prisoners' morale and improved treatment. They were also heartened to know that a rescue effort had been attempted. The North Vietnamese were shaken at the ease in which Americans could invade so close to their capital, and no American lives were lost in the operation (and only one minor injury, a sprained ankle). For his outstanding leadership, Simons was decorated by President Richard Nixon with the Distinguished Service Cross at the White House on November 25, 1970.

Simons' nickname "Bull" was taken from a physical training game called the "bull pit", where one soldier climbs down into a pit in the ground, and other soldiers engage in trying to pull the first soldier from the pit. Simon's large physical stature and great strength — even in his fifties, he did 250 push-ups every day — made him a formidable challenge to remove from the pit, and the name "Bull" stuck.

== In retirement ==
Colonel Simons retired from the Army on July 31, 1971, and moved with his wife to a small farm in Red Bay, Walton County, Florida, engaging in livestock farming and doing amateur gunsmithing on the side.

In late 1978, Simons was contacted by Texas businessman Ross Perot, who requested his direction and leadership to help free two employees of Electronic Data Systems who had been arrested shortly before the Iranian Revolution. Simons organized a rescue mission and ultimately freed the two men from the Iranian prison. All involved returned safely to the United States. The rescue operation was described in On Wings of Eagles (1983) written by British author Ken Follett.

Three months after the rescue mission, while on vacation in Vail, Colorado, Simons suffered a heart attack. He was transported to Dallas, Texas by a private jet chartered by Perot. He died one month later of persistent heart failure at the age of 60. He is interred in the Barrancas National Cemetery in Pensacola, Florida.

=== Legacy ===
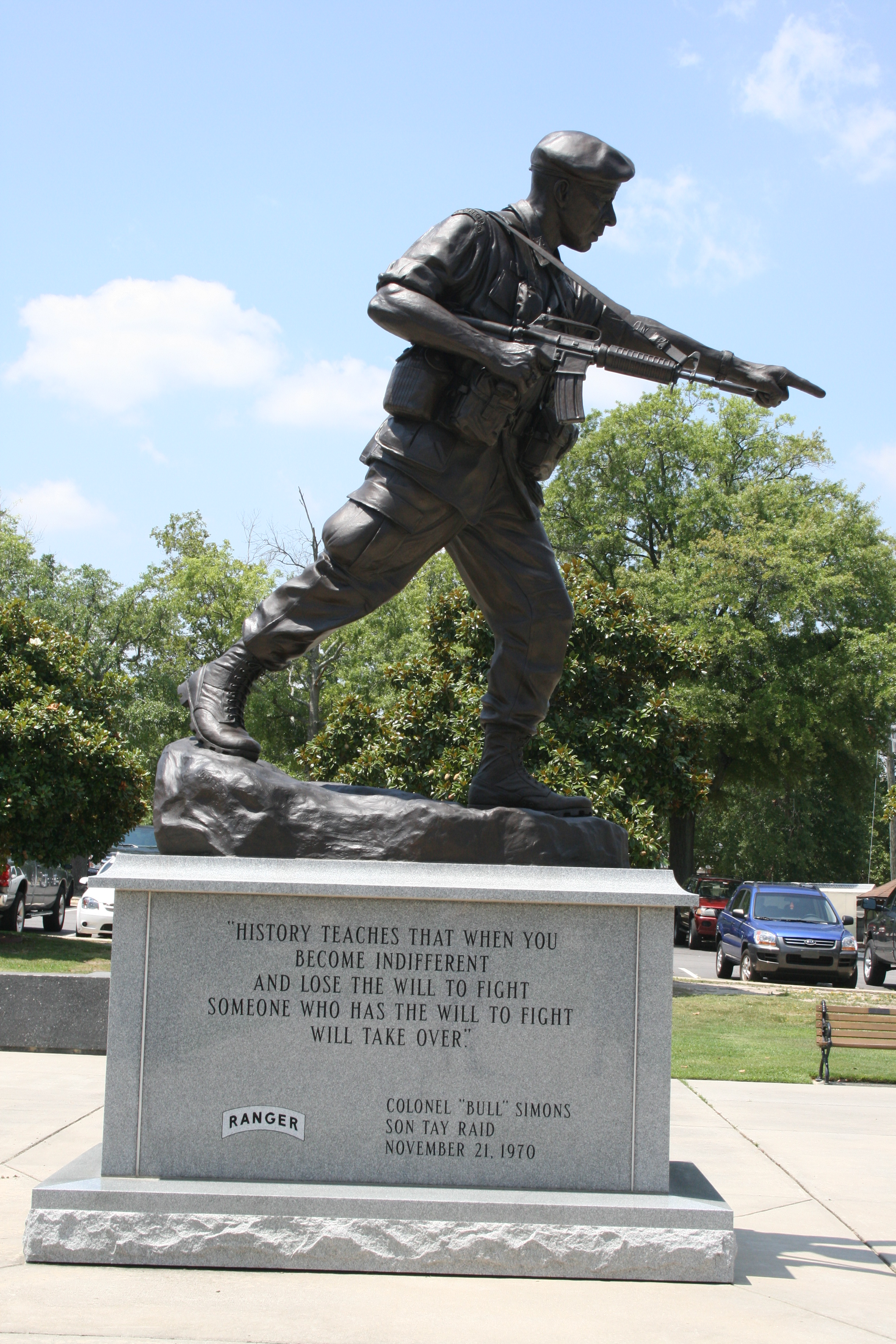
Statue of Simons at Special Warfare Museum

Ross Perot and others founded a scholarship initiative for the children of the casualties from the Iranian hostage rescue attempt, and named the fund in honor of Colonel Simons' memory.

In April 2010, the Arthur D. "Bull" Simons Center for Interagency Cooperation was opened as a result of a donation by Ross Perot to the Command and General Staff College Foundation, Inc.

Colonel Simons' great contributions to the army and the Special Forces community are honored with a 12-foot-tall (3.7 m) statue that stands in front of the John F. Kennedy Special Warfare Center and School at Fort Bragg, North Carolina.

The John F. Kennedy Special Warfare Center and School presents an annual award called the "'Bull' Simons Award" to an outstanding special forces operator.

Colonel Simons was also inducted into the Ranger Hall of Fame.

== Distinguished Service Cross Citation ==
=== Distinguished Service Cross ===
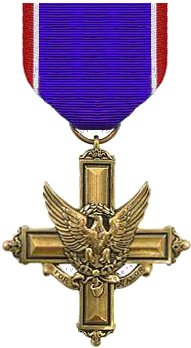

Citation:

The President of the United States of America, authorized by Act of Congress, July 9, 1918 (amended by act of July 25, 1963), takes pleasure in presenting the Distinguished Service Cross to Colonel (Infantry) Arthur D. Simons, United States Army, for extraordinary heroism while commanding the ground element of a joint United States task force on an operation deep in North Vietnam on 21 November 1970. With complete disregard for his own personal safety, Colonel Simons voluntarily participated as a member of a Joint Task Force with the humanitarian mission of rescuing United States military personnel held as prisoners of war at the Son Tay Prison Compound approximately twenty nautical miles from Hanoi, the capital of North Vietnam. In an outstanding display of leadership and personal courage, Colonel Simons led the ground force in the rescue effort. On the ground, the search and rescue element was immediately taken under automatic weapons fire by the enemy. While directing and supervising the operation, Colonel Simons continually exposed himself to enemy fire and, on one occasion, personally took under fire enemy personnel in close proximity to his position. The success of the operation was the direct result of Colonel Simons' calm and competent leadership in an extremely hazardous situation. His professional conduct instilled confidence in his men and resulted in an outstanding operation. Colonel Simons' extraordinary heroism was in keeping with the highest traditions of the United States Army and reflects great credit on him and the United States Army.

== Awards and decorations ==

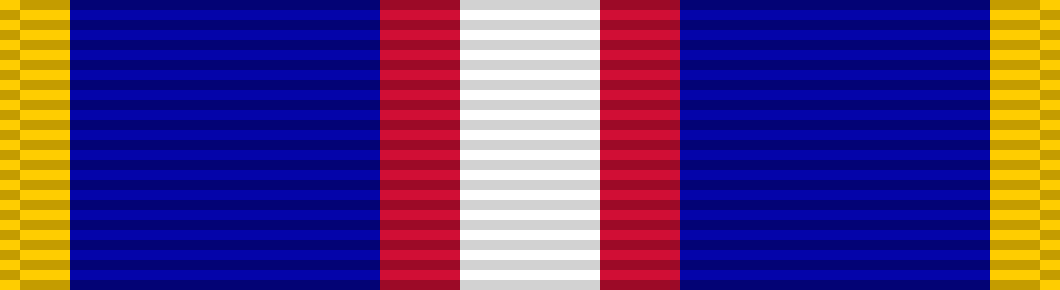

Badge	Combat Infantryman Badge with Star denoting 2nd award		
1st row	Distinguished Service Cross		
2nd row	Silver Star	Legion of Merit with 4 Oak leaf clusters	Bronze Star Medal with "V" Device and 1 Oak leaf cluster
3rd row	Purple Heart	Meritorious Service Medal	Air Medal
4th row	Army Commendation Medal	Army Reserve Good Conduct Medal	American Defense Service Medal
5th row	American Campaign Medal	Asiatic-Pacific Campaign Medal with Arrowhead Device and 3 Campaign stars	World War II Victory Medal
6th row	Army of Occupation Medal with 'Japan' Clasp	National Defense Service Medal with 1 Oak leaf cluster	Armed Forces Expeditionary Medal with 1 Campaign star
7th row	Vietnam Service Medal with 3 Campaign stars	Korea Defense Service Medal	Armed Forces Reserve Medal with Bronze Hourglass device
8th row	Philippine Liberation Medal with 2 Campaign stars	Philippine Independence Medal	Vietnam Campaign Medal
Badge	Master Parachutist Badge		
Tab	Special Forces Tab		Ranger Tab
Unit awards	Presidential Unit Citation		
	Meritorious Unit Commendation	Philippine Presidential Unit Citation	Republic of Vietnam Gallantry Cross Unit Citation with Palm

Vietnam Army Distinguished Service Order

2nd class

== Assignments ==
- 1941–1944: B Battery, 98th Field Artillery (FA) Battalion
- 1944–1946: 6th Ranger Battalion (98th FA became the 6th Ranger Battalion)
- 1946–1951: (Out of service)
- 1951–1954: Amphibious and Jungle Training Camp, Ranger Training Camp, Fort Benning, Georgia
- 1954–1957: U.S. Army Assistance Advisory Group, Ankara, Turkey
- 1957–1958: XVIII Airborne Corps and Fort Bragg, North Carolina
- 1958–1959: C Team, 77th SFG (A), Fort Bragg, North Carolina
- 1959–1961: 7th SFG (A) (Operation Hotfoot and White Star Mobile Training Team), Laos
- 1962–1963: JFK Center for Special Warfare
- 1963–1965: 8th SFG (A), Panama
- 1965–1966: MACV-SOG, Republic of Vietnam
- 1966–1968: XVIII Airborne Corps and Fort Bragg, North Carolina
- 1969: Corps, Camp Red Cloud, Korea
- 1970: Deputy Commander, Joint Contingency Task Group
- 1970–1971: XVIII Airborne Corps and Fort Bragg, North Carolina
- Total Time in Service: 32 years
- Total Active Service: 24 years
- Total Foreign Service: 8 years (Turkey, USARPAC, USARCARIB, RVN, Korea)
