= Pawcatuck (disambiguation) =

Pawcatuck is a census-designated place in Connecticut.

Pawcatuck may also refer to:

- USS Pawcatuck (AO-108), fleet replenishment oiler

== See also ==
- Pawcatuck River, in Connecticut and Rhode Island
