= Fred Bardshar =

Frederic Abshire Bardshar
- Born: 20 October 1915; Seattle, Washington
- Died: 13 September 1993 (aged 77); La Jolla, San Diego, California
- Military career
- Allegiance: United States
- Branch: United States Navy
- Service years: 1934–1972
- Rank: Vice Admiral
- Commands: Task Force 77; Carrier Division Seven; USS Constellation; USS Pawcatuck; Air Transport Squadron 32; Air Group 27
- Conflicts: World War II; Vietnam War
- Awards: Navy Distinguished Service Medal; Silver Star; Legion of Merit (4); Distinguished Flying Cross (3); Air Medal (6)

Vice Admiral Frederic Abshire Bardshar (20 October 1915 – 13 September 1993) was an American World War II air ace, who later became Commander of United States Navy Task Force 77 and Carrier Division Five during the Vietnam War.

== Military career ==
=== World War II ===
During World War II, Lieutenant Commander Bardshar piloted a Grumman F6F-5 Hellcat, and was credited with eight kills at the Philippines during the Battle for Leyte Gulf in 1944. He was made commander of Air Group 27, based aboard USS Princeton.

=== 1960s ===
From November 1963 to November 1964, Captain Bardshar was the third Commanding Officer of the aircraft carrier USS Constellation. In 1969, Rear Admiral Bardshar led an investigation into the fire aboard the USS Enterprise when a Zuni rocket misfired, resulting in the deaths of 27 crew, and 314 more injured.

=== Vietnam War ===
Bardshar commanded the Constellation during the Gulf of Tonkin Incident from which he led the first U.S. attacks on Vietnam. Later he served two tours with the Joint Chiefs of Staff. As Vice Director of Operations he led the planning for Operation Duck Hook to escalate U.S. involvement, eventually denied by President Nixon. As commander of Task Force 77 he was involved in Operation Ivory Coast, to liberate 55 American pilots from Son Tay POW camp. On 20 August 1970, Vice Admiral Bardshar hosted the President of the Philippines, Ferdinand Marcos, aboard the aircraft carrier USS America.

Bardshar died at La Jolla, San Diego, on 13 September 1993.

== Awards and decorations ==
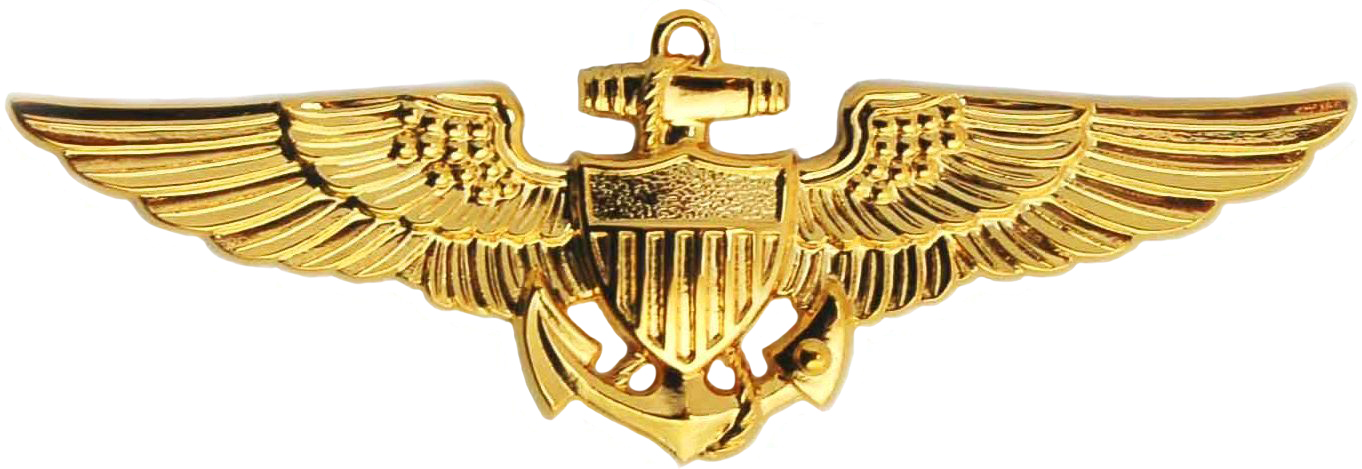

Naval Aviator Badge
| Navy Distinguished Service Medal | Silver Star | Legion of Merit w/ Combat "V" and three 5/16" Gold Stars |
| Distinguished Flying Cross w/ two 5/16" Gold Stars | Air Medal w/ 5/16" Silver Star | Navy and Marine Corps Commendation Medal w/ Combat "V" |
| Combat Action Ribbon | Navy Unit Commendation w/ three 3/16" Bronze Stars | Navy Meritorious Unit Commendation |
| American Defense Service Medal w/ one 3/16" Bronze Star | American Campaign Medal | Asiatic-Pacific Campaign Medal w/ one 3/16" Silver Star |
| World War II Victory Medal | Navy Occupation Service Medal w/ 'Japan' clasp | National Defense Service Medal w/ one 3/16" Bronze Star |
| Vietnam Service Medal w/ three 3/16" Bronze Stars | National Order of Vietnam (Commander) | Republic of Vietnam Gallantry Cross Unit Citation |
| Philippine Liberation Medal w/ one 3/16" Bronze Star | Philippine Independence Medal | Vietnam Campaign Medal |
