= Operation Ivory Coast =

American military operation during the Vietnam War (1970)

- Part of the Vietnam War
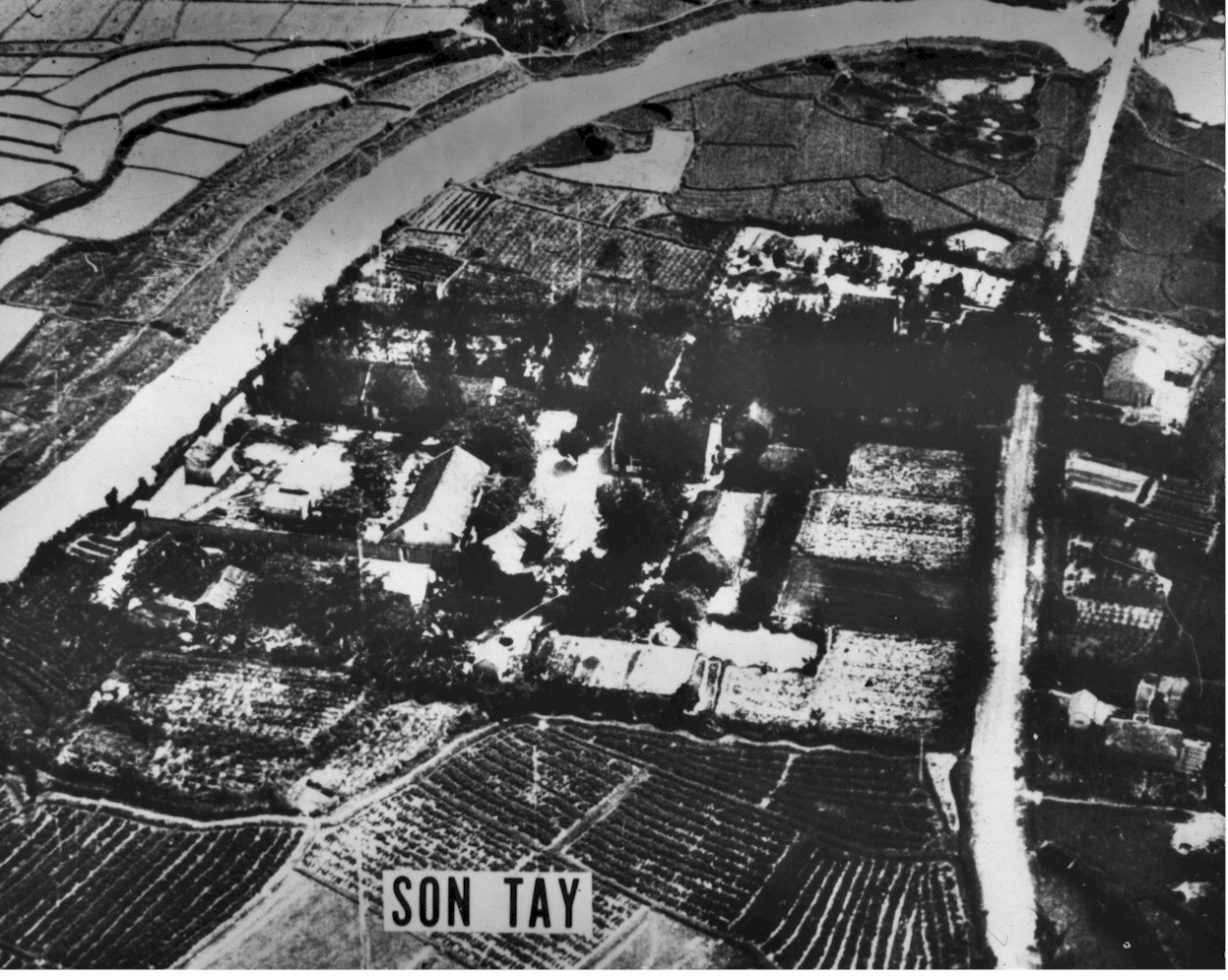
- Sơn Tây prison camp. The walled compound is center left next to the river
Date	21 November 1970
Location	Sơn Tây, North Vietnam 21.1446°N 105.4958°E
Result	Infiltration and retreat successful; Failure - No POWs to rescue at site

Belligerents
North Vietnam	United States

Commanders and leaders
Unknown	LeRoy J. Manor; Arthur D. Simons

Strength
Unknown	56 Special Forces soldiers 92 airmen (Note: Gargus was radar navigator on one of the aircraft and a mission planner.); 28 aircraft

Casualties and losses
U.S report: 42 guards killed Vietnamese source: 6 guards killed 7 civilians killed 2 civilians wounded	None killed 2 wounded 1 helicopter and 1 airplane
- Location within Vietnam

Operation Ivory Coast was a mission conducted by United States Special Operations Forces and other American military elements to rescue U.S. prisoners of war during the Vietnam War. It was also the first joint military operation in United States history conducted under the direct control of the Chairman of the Joint Chiefs of Staff. The specially selected raiders extensively trained and rehearsed the operation at Eglin Air Force Base, Florida, while planning and intelligence gathering continued from 25 May to 20 November 1970.

On 21 November 1970, a joint United States Air Force and United States Army force commanded by Air Force Brigadier General LeRoy J. Manor and Army Colonel Arthur D. "Bull" Simons landed 56 U.S. Army Special Forces soldiers by helicopter at the Sơn Tây prisoner-of-war camp, which was located 23 miles (37 km) west of Hanoi, North Vietnam. The objective of the operation was the recovery of 61 American prisoners of war thought to be held at the camp. It was found during the raid that the camp contained no prisoners as they had recently been moved to another camp.

Despite the absence of prisoners, the raid's execution was nearly flawless, with only two casualties and two aircraft losses (one of the aircraft losses was due to a planned crash landing during the assault on the prisoner compound). Criticism of the failure to detect the removal of the POWs prior to the raid, both public and within the administration of Richard Nixon, led to a major reorganization of the United States intelligence community a year later.

== Planning, organization and training ==
=== Polar Circle ===
The concept of a rescue mission inside North Vietnam began on 9 May 1970. An Air Force intelligence unit concluded through analysis of aerial photography that a compound near Sơn Tây, suspected since late 1968 of being a prisoner of war camp, contained 55 American POWs and that at least six were in urgent need of rescue. (Note: The USAF intelligence unit was the 1127th Field Activities Group, Fort Belvoir, Virginia.) 12,000 North Vietnamese troops were stationed within 5 miles (8.0 km) of the camp. After validation of their findings, Brigadier General (BG) James R. Allen, the deputy director for plans and policy at Headquarters USAF, met in the Pentagon on 25 May with Army BG Donald Blackburn, Special Assistant for Counterinsurgency and Special Activities (SACSA). Blackburn reported directly to the Chairman of the Joint Chiefs of Staff and had also been the first commander of the covert Studies and Observation Group in Vietnam.

Blackburn immediately met with General Earle G. Wheeler, the outgoing JCS Chairman, to recommend a rescue of all the POWs at Son Tây. To study the feasibility of a raid, Wheeler authorized a 15-member planning group under the codename Polar Circle that convened on June 10. One of its members was an officer who would actually participate in the raid as a rescue helicopter pilot. (Note: LTC Warner A. Britton was a combat rescue expert, having begun his 26-year career in World War II as an OA-10 (USAAF variant of the PBY Catalina) pilot in the Thirteenth Air Force. While he had limited experience flying the HH-53, he had commanded two rescue squadron detachments in Vietnam.) The study group, after a review of all available intelligence, concluded that Sơn Tây contained 61 POWs.

When Blackburn's recommendation that he lead the mission himself was turned down, he asked Colonel Arthur D. Simons on 13 July to command the Army's personnel. Eglin Air Force Base was selected as the joint training site for the prospective force. (Note: Schemmer states that Fort Bragg, North Carolina, was the Army's base of choice, but that the commander of the Special Warfare Center refused Simon's request for a specific secure location, and so he chose Eglin instead. However, Gargus (pp. 10–11) stated that Simons was not named as deputy until after Manor had already been selected to command the mission, and that it was Manor who chose Eglin, his own base, as the "ideal training site for the joint raiding force.") Personnel selection proceeded over the objections of the Marine Corps, which was excluded from participation, but selection and planning was performed by Special Operations "operators", not by the JCS, to avoid service parochialism, resulting in a force chosen for mission needs, highlighting combat experience in Southeast Asia and operational specialty skills, and not rank or branch of service.

=== Ivory Coast ===
The second phase, Operation Ivory Coast, began on 8 August 1970, when Admiral Thomas H. Moorer, the new JCS Chairman, designated Manor as commander and Simons as deputy commander of the mission task force. Ivory Coast was the organization, planning, training, and deployment phase of the operation. Manor set up an Air Force training facility at Eglin's Duke Field and brought together a 27-member planning staff that included 11 from the prior feasibility study.

Simons chose 103 personnel from interviews of 500 volunteers, most were Special Forces personnel of the 6th and 7th Special Forces Groups at Fort Bragg, North Carolina. USAF planners selected key Air Force commanders, who then picked personnel for their crews. Helicopter and A-1 Skyraider crews were put together from instructors at Eglin and personnel returned from Southeast Asia. Two crews for C-130E(I) Combat Talons (Note: The "MC-130" designation for the Combat Talon did not appear until 1977.) were assembled from squadrons in West Germany and North Carolina. (Note: None of the flight members had flown together as crews before training began.) All were then asked to volunteer for a temporary duty assignment without additional pay and without being told the nature of the mission. (Note: Among those who entered North Vietnam, only four Army and eleven USAF officers (all members of the planning group) had advance knowledge of the target. Because of Eglin's proximity to Cuba, many members believed the target was there.) 103 Army and 116 USAF personnel were selected for the project, including ground force members, aircrewmen, support members and planners. (Note: Schemmer's list omits two of seven USAF helicopter crewmen who joined the JCTG in Thailand after it deployed but did not train in Florida, and a pilot who participated in all training but did not fly the mission, replaced at the last minute by a veteran rescue pilot who had not previously volunteered. His list does include all aircraft support personnel who deployed; a small team from AFLC who maintained voice radio jamming equipment installed in the A-1s; and technical representatives of Texas Instruments who maintained the Combat Talon's AN/APQ-115 Terrain Following/Terrain Avoidance navigational radar because of its low mean-time-between-failure rate (Thigpen, pp. 38–39).) (Note: Gargus's list includes the 14 HC-130 crewmen (omitted by Schemmer) who did not train in Florida.) The 219-man (Note: CPT Nina Gusev, an intelligence officer with the 388th Tactical Fighter Wing, was added to the planning staff in Thailand and was the only woman involved in the mission.) task force planned, trained, and operated under the title of the "Joint Contingency Task Group" (JCTG).

The planning staff set up parameters for a nighttime raid, the key points of which were clear weather and a quarter moon at 35 degrees above the horizon for optimum visibility during low-level flight. From these parameters, two mission "windows" were identified, 18–25 October and 18–25 November. Training proceeded on Range C-2 at Eglin using an exact but crudely made replica of the prison compound for rehearsals (Note: The often-made assertion that the mockup was taken down during the day and reassembled at night to avoid detection by Soviet spy satellites is a myth, apparently resulting from an anecdotal assertion in Schemmer's account (as late as 2001 histories repeated this error using Schemmer as a source; see Thigpen p. 148). While the geometry and dimensions of the prison compound were exact in the mockup, and it had been built of two-by-four studs and two horizontal strips of cloth to facilitate such disassembly, the mockup had no roofs or solid walls, and blended too well with dirt roads and other features already present, to be identified as Sơn Tây. Gargus states that it resembled "a stockyard in disrepair." However, to satisfy security concerns, aerial photographs were taken to be certain of that conclusion. Similarly, the claim that full-size trees were uprooted and relocated to exact locations is also a myth. Even were such a labor-intensive idea not outlandish, the probable loss of helicopters during practice would have canceled the mission (Potted plant miniatures were positioned to locate trees at the practice site). (Gargus, pp. 46–47)) and a $60,000 five-foot-by-five-foot scale table model (codenamed "Barbara") for familiarization. (Note: "Barbara" was named for Barbara L. Strosnider, a GS-6 administrative assistant in the USAF Directorate of Plans who transcribed plans for both the feasibility and planning groups. The table model is on permanent display at the National Museum of the United States Air Force.)

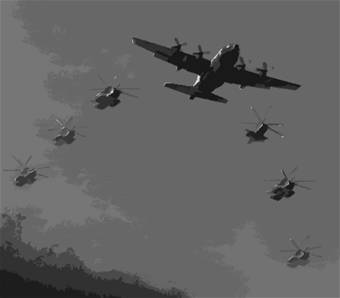
Practice formation showing helicopters drafting on their Combat Talon navigation escort. The HH-3E is third from the right as viewed.

Air Force crews flew 1,054 hours in southern Alabama, Georgia, and Florida conducting "dissimilar (aircraft) formation" training with both UH-1H and HH-3E helicopters at night and at low-level (a flight profile for which procedures had to be innovated by the two selected crews), and gaining expertise in navigation training using forward looking infrared (FLIR), which, until Ivory Coast, had not been part of the Combat Talon's electronics suite. (Note: Two FL-2B FLIR sets were borrowed from the 1198th Operational Evaluation and Training Squadron, a part of Project Heavy Chain, the developmental program for the clandestine special operations C-130 from which the Combat Talon had been created.) A vee formation in which the slower helicopters drafted in echelon slightly above and behind each wing of the Combat Talon escort aircraft was chosen and refined for the mission to give the helicopters the speed necessary to keep pace with the Talons flying just above their stall speeds.

Special Forces training began on 9 September, advancing to night training on 17 September and joint training with air crews on 28 September that included six rehearsals a day, three of them under night conditions. By 6 October, 170 practice sessions of all or partial phases of the mission were performed on the mockup by the Special Forces troopers, many with live fire. On that date, the first full-scale dress rehearsal, using a UH-1H as the assault helicopter, was conducted at night and included a 5.5-hour, 687 miles (1,106 km) flight of all aircraft, replicating the timing, speeds, altitudes and turns in the mission plan. The rehearsal spelled the end of the option to use the UH-1 when its small passenger compartment resulted in leg cramps to the Special Forces troopers that completely disrupted the timing of their assault, more than offsetting the UH-1's only advantage (smaller rotor radius) over the larger HH-3. Two further full night rehearsals and a total of 31 practice landings by the HH-3E in the mockup's courtyard confirmed the choice.

On 24 September, Manor recommended approval of the October window to US Secretary of Defense Melvin Laird, with 21 October as the primary execution date. However, at a White House briefing on 8 October with National Security Advisor Henry Kissinger and General Alexander M. Haig, (Note: Also present were Blackburn and Lieutenant general John W. Vogt, Jr., Director of the Joint Staff and Blackburn's boss. (Schemmer, p. 113).) Kissinger delayed the mission to the November window because President Nixon was not in Washington and could not be briefed in time for approval of the October window. This delay, while posing a risk of compromising the secrecy of the mission, had the benefits of additional training, acquisition of night-vision equipment and further reconnaissance of the prison.

Manor and Simons met with the commander of Task Force 77, Vice Admiral Frederic A. Bardshar, aboard his flagship USS America on 5 November to arrange for a diversionary mission to be flown by naval aircraft. (Note: America was about to rotate home and would be replaced by the Ranger.) Because of policy restrictions of the bombing halt then in place, the naval aircraft would not carry ordnance except for a few planes tasked for Combat Search and Rescue (CSAR).

Between 10 and 18 November, the JCTG moved to its staging base at Takhli Royal Thai Air Force Base, Thailand. (Note: Takhli, once a major USAF base, was about to shut down, and was chosen both for that reason and the presence of a secure complex formerly used by the Central Intelligence Agency.) The Combat Talons, using the call signs Daw 43 and Thumb 66 in the guise of being a part of Project Heavy Chain, left Eglin on 10 November, flew to Norton Air Force Base, California, (Note: The Heavy Chain program office was maintained at Norton.) and then routed through Hickam Air Force Base, Hawaii and Kadena Air Base, Okinawa, arriving in Takhli on 14 November. The next day, four C-141 Starlifters departed one per day (to avoid the appearance of a major operation in progress), carrying the Army contingent of the JCTG, its equipment and the UH-1 helicopter from Eglin to Thailand. (Note: Manor deployed the UH-1 and its crew in the event that an operational HH-3E, which was being phased out in Southeast Asia in favor of the HH-53, was not available. (Thigpen, p. 150) As it turned out, the last two HH-3Es in Southeast Asia, already scheduled for transfer to Kadena AB, were assigned to the operation, one as a spare. (Gargus, p. 110)) The Special Forces personnel arrived in Thailand at 03:00 local time 18 November (Note: 15:00 the previous day in Washington D.C.) and later that date President Nixon approved execution of the mission, setting in motion the final phase, Operation Kingpin.

After overcoming in-theater friction with the 1st Weather Group at Tan Son Nhut Air Base, South Vietnam, planners began watching the weather during the week before the projected target date. On 18 November, Typhoon Patsy struck the Philippines and headed west towards Hanoi. Weather forecasts indicated that Patsy would cause bad weather over the Gulf of Tonkin on 21 November, preventing carrier support operations, and converging with a cold front coming out of southern China, would cause poor conditions over North Vietnam for the remainder of the window. The presence of the cold front, however, indicated that conditions in the objective area on 20 November would be good and possibly acceptable over Laos for navigation of the low-level penetration flights. A reconnaissance flight on the afternoon of 20 November by an RF-4C Phantom carrying a weather specialist confirmed the forecast. (Note: The specialist was LTC Frank A. Ross of the 10th Weather Squadron, who was a qualified fighter pilot.) Manor decided to advance the mission date by 24 hours rather than delay it by five days.

Manor issued the formal launch order at 15:56 local time 20 November, while the raiding force was in the final stages of crew rest, and brought together the entire ground contingent for a short briefing regarding the objective and launch times. Following the briefing, Manor and his staff flew by T-39 Sabreliner to Da Nang Air Base, where they would monitor the mission from the USAF Tactical Air Control Center, North Sector (TACC/NS) at Monkey Mountain Facility. Three theater lift C-130s previously staged at U-Tapao Royal Thai Navy Airfield arrived at Takhli to transport the Army contingent and helicopter crews to Udorn RTAFB and the A-1 pilots to Nakhon Phanom.

== Mission organization ==
=== Special Forces ===
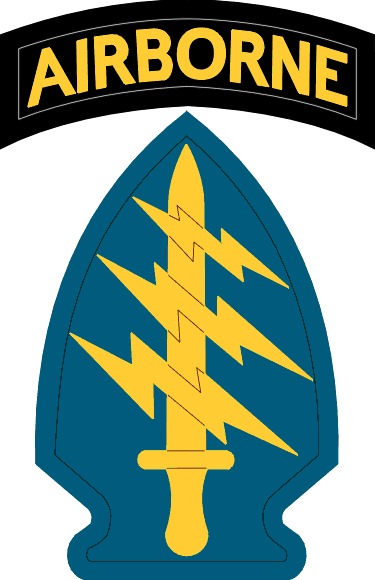

The fifty-six Special Forces troopers selected to conduct the raid were flown from Takhli to their helicopter staging base at Udorn RTAFB by C-130 on the evening of 20 November. The Special Forces were organized into three platoons: a 14-man assault group, codenamed Blueboy, which would crash-land within the prison compound; a 22-man support group, Greenleaf, which would provide immediate support for the assault team and a 20-man security group, Redwine, to protect the prison area from People's Army of Vietnam (PAVN) reaction forces and provide backup support if needed for either of the other two groups. Simons (using the call sign Axle) (Note: Simons' "official" role was deputy commander of the JCTG. (Gargus, p. 267)) accompanied the Greenleaf group, while the ground force commander, LTC Elliott P. "Bud" Sydnor Jr. (Wildroot), was with the Redwine group. (Note: Major John Waresh, co-pilot of A-1E Peach 01, also states that Simons' callsign was Axle. Schemmer (p.91), however, asserts that Wildroot was Simons' call sign, and (p. 169) implies that recorded radio traffic of the mission confirms this. However the traffic from Blueboy to Wildroot that Schemmer refers to was not ascribed by him to any individual by name but to the "ground commander," who was Sydnor, not Simons.)

The 56 raiders were heavily armed, carrying a total of 51 personal sidearms, 48 CAR-15 carbines, two M16 rifles, four M79 grenade launchers, two shotguns and four M60 machine guns. They carried 15 Claymore mines, 11 demolition charges and 213 hand grenades and were equipped with a plethora of wire cutters, bolt cutters, axes, chainsaws, crowbars, ropes, bullhorns, lights and other equipment (much of it acquired from commercial retail sources) to execute the mission. The ground force was also equipped for voice communications with 58 UHF-AM and 34 VHF-FM radios, including a survival radio for each individual soldier. (Note: There were two AN/PRC-41 sets for UHF air-to-ground communication, ten AN/PRC-77 sets for directing air strikes, 24 AN/PRC-88 "squad radios" for communication within and among the groups, and 56 Air Force AN/PRC-90 survival radios pre-set to SAR frequencies. During training, each of the 92 radios had a backup set, plus 50 additional sets for redundancy, with Schemmer noting the force was as well-equipped in communications as a battalion of infantry.)

=== Aviation support ===
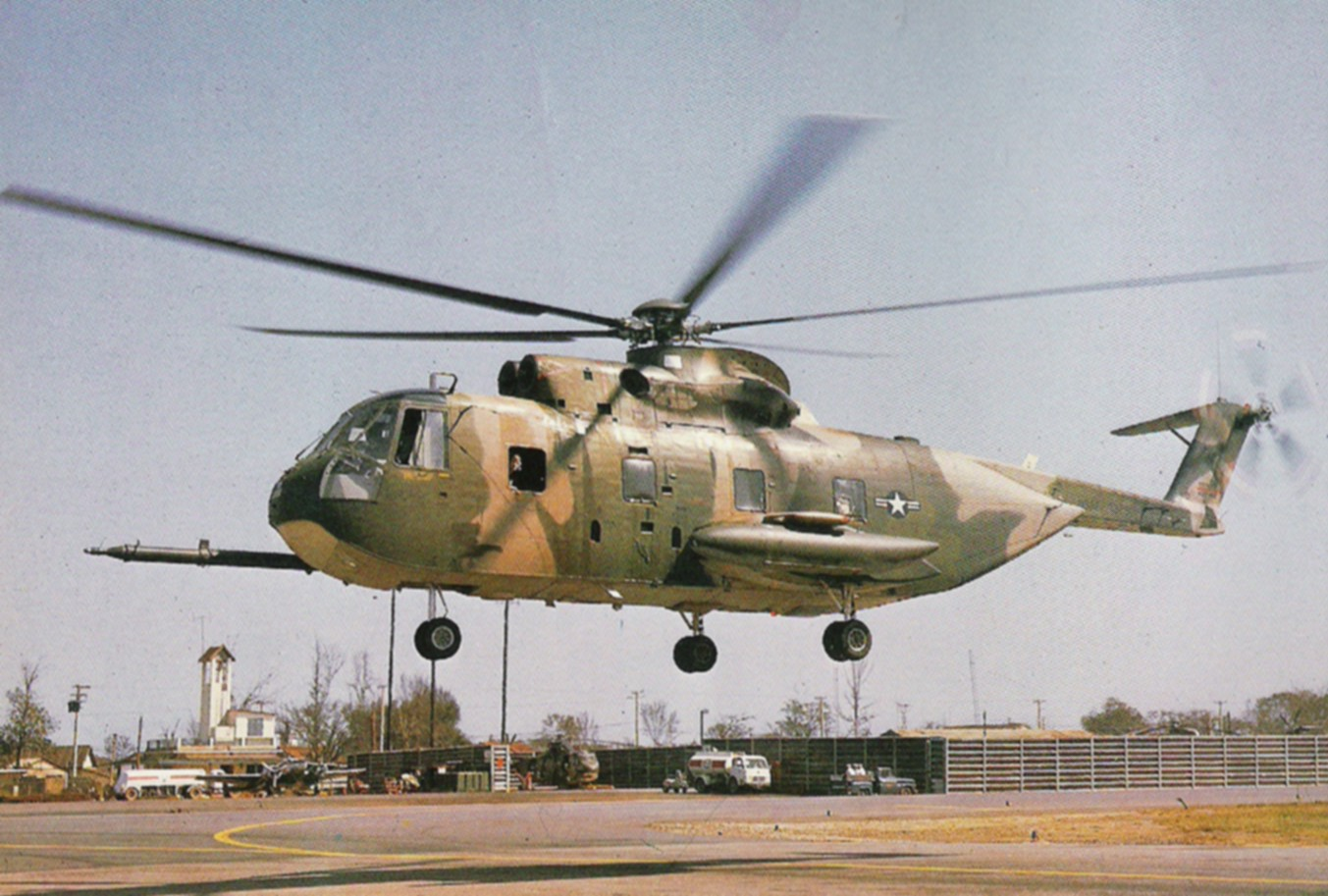
HH-3E "Jolly Green" identical to the helicopter carrying the Blueboy assault group

116 aircraft (59 Navy and 57 USAF) participated in the operation, with 28 aircraft (crewed by 92 airmen) assigned direct roles in the target area. (Note: Aircraft assigned to the USAF support force included two HC-130P helicopter refueling and command aircraft (Lime 01-02), twelve KC-135 tankers (refueling tracks Orange and Lemon), two EC-121T airborne early warning aircraft (Frog 01-02), two RC-135M Rivet Card/Combat Apple ELINT aircraft, and one KC-135A Combat Lightning radio relay plane (call sign Luzon), along with 10 F-4s assigned to provide combat air patrol. A T-39 Sabreliner, three C-130 Hercules theater airlifters, and a standby SAR force of two HH-53s and four A-1s rounded out the USAF participants. The Navy provided ten A-6 Intruders and 27 A-7 Corsairs in multiple roles including aerial refueling, six F-4J Phantom and six F-8J Crusader fighters, two E-1B Tracer airborne early warning aircraft, one KA-3B Skywarrior tanker and six EKA-3B Skywarrior tanker-ECM aircraft. The 59th naval aircraft was an EP-3B "Bat Rack" Orion from the VQ-1 detachment at NAS Agana, Guam. A 60th scheduled aircraft aborted before launch from Ranger. Not included in these totals are a C-123 "Candle" flare ship and an EC-130 ABCCC aircraft, Alley Cat, that diverted from other Laotian missions to aid the SAR, two C-141 Starlifters staged at Udorn to transport critically ill POWs, nor the UH-1H transported from Florida to Thailand with the JCTG.) Two C-130E(I) Combat Talons, modified with the temporary addition of FLIR sets, were assigned to navigate the mission. One was to lead the helicopter "assault formation" (Cherry 01) and the second to escort the A-1 "strike formation" (Cherry 02). (Note: The formation designations were those used by the JCTG.) Because of the variances in cruising speeds between the helicopters and fixed-wing aircraft, the forces flew separate routes, with the faster strike formation trailing the helicopter formation by several minutes and zig-zagging across its route. Each Combat Talon crew cross-trained to assume the role of the other, but the assault formation was required to have a navigation leader with four fully functioning engines all the way to the objective.

The 28 aircraft with direct roles were:

#	Type	Radio call sign	Parent Unit	Kingpin task
2	MC-130E(I) Combat Talon	Cherry 01–02	7th SOS, Det. 2 1st SOW	rescue force navigation, airborne command, and target illumination.
2	HC-130P Hercules	Lime 01–02	39th Aerospace Rescue and Recovery Squadron	rescue force navigation and refueling, airborne command.
5	HH-53C Super Jolly (Note: All of the rotary wing aircraft were obtained in-theater on the day of the operation by pre-arrangement with their parent units. Four additional pararescuemen were also added to the crews of Apples 01, 02, 04, and 05 to provide a second PJ for the crew, which was standard in SEA. The five HH-53s were, respectively, 68-10357, 68-10361, 68-8286, 68-8285, and 68-10359.)	Apple 01–05	40th ARRS (3rd ARRG)	support teams lift (01, 02), gunship (03), and POW extraction (04, 05).
1	HH-3E Jolly Green (Note: S/n 65-12785, one of 50 HH-3Es converted from CH-3B and C models for SAR.)	Banana	37th ARRS (3rd ARRG)	assault team lift.
5	A-1E Skyraider	Peach 01–05	1st SOS (56th SOW)	close air support at objective.
10	F-4D Phantom	Falcon 01–05, 11–15	13th TFS, 555th TFS (432nd TRW)	high altitude target area MiG combat air patrol in two waves.
5	F-105G Wild Weasel III	Firebird 01–05	6010th WWS (Note: The 6010th Wild Weasel Squadron was formed 1 November 1970 from aircraft and crews of the inactivating 355th TFW at Takhli.) (388th TFW)	high altitude target area surface-to-air missile suppression.

== Execution of Operation Kingpin ==
=== Penetration into North Vietnam ===
Beginning at 22:00 20 November 1970, (Note: All times are UTC+7 (+12 Eastern Standard Time).) aircraft began leaving five bases in Thailand and one in South Vietnam. (Note: Takhli (C-130E(I)), Korat (EC-121, F-105G), Udorn (helicopters, HC-130, F-4), Nakhon Phanom (A-1), U Tapao (KC-135) and Da Nang (EKA-3).) Cherry 02, the Combat Talon escort for the A-1 strike formation, took off from Takhli at 22:25. Cherry 01, scheduled to take off a half hour later, had difficulty starting an engine and took off 23 minutes late at 23:18. Cherry 01 adjusted its flight plan and made up the time lost at engine start. At 23:07, two HC-130P aerial refuelers (call signs Lime 01 and Lime 02) took off from Udorn, followed by the helicopters ten minutes later. Shortly after midnight, the A-1 Skyraiders lifted off four minutes early from Nakhon Phanom RTAFB under blacked-out conditions. The helicopters encountered thick clouds over northern Laos at their refueling altitude and climbed to 7,000 feet (2,100 m) AGL (Above Ground Level) to refuel from Lime 01 on the flight plan's fourth leg. Lime 01 then led them to the next checkpoint for hand-off to Cherry 01 at 01:16.

The formations flew roughly parallel tracks that crossed Laos to the west of the Plain of Jars before turning northeastward. Both formations flew twelve planned legs. The flight path was a corridor 6 miles (9.7 km) wide, the width required for safe terrain clearance in the event of formation breakup or the loss of drafting position by a helicopter. The Combat Talon navigators had the task of keeping the formations on the center line of the corridor. Pilots of both formations required a flight path of descending legs, maintaining an altitude of 1,000 feet (300 m) above ground level in the mountain valleys, because the HH-3E had difficulties in climbing while in formation. The Combat Talon C-130s experienced sluggish flight controls at the required airspeeds and the A-1s were hampered by their heavy ordnance loads.

The slow speeds necessary for the formations, 105 knots (194 km/h; 121 mph) for the helicopters and 145 knots (269 km/h; 167 mph) for the A-1s, degraded nearly all modes of the Combat Talon's AN/APQ-115 TF/TA navigational radars. The Terrain Following mode computed changes in altitude only to a programmed minimum airspeed of 160 knots (300 km/h; 180 mph), well outside the parameters of the mission. The Terrain Avoidance mode (adapted from the AN/APQ-99 terrain avoidance radar of the RF-4C photo reconnaissance aircraft) was distorted by the nose-high attitude dictated by the slow speeds and would no longer display hazardous terrain directly in front of or below the Combat Talon's flight path. The Doppler radar (used to calculate wind drift and ground speed) often had to use information in its computer's memory because of processing lapses. While the ground-mapping radar (correlating landmarks shown on maps to radar returns) was not affected, the jungle terrain did not provide easily identifiable points. All of these handicaps were overcome with the external pod installation of FLIR, which readily identified the rivers and lakes used as turning points.

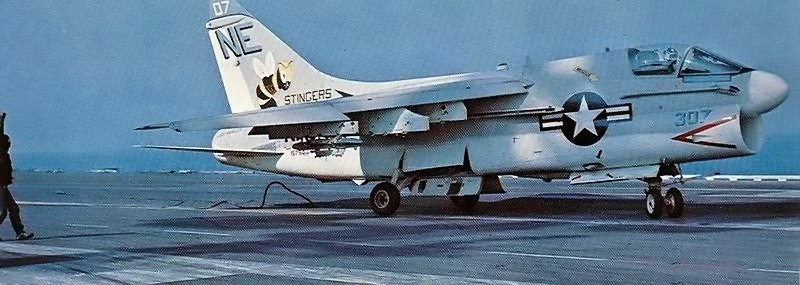
VA-113 A-7E on deck of USS Ranger 1970–71

The assault formation approached from the southwest using the clutter returns of the mountains to mask them from radar detection, while U.S. Navy aircraft launched at 01:00 21 November from the aircraft carriers USS Oriskany (Note: CVW-19 (NM) embarked. Aircraft from VA-153, VA-155, VF-191, VF-194, VAQ-130 and VAW-111 participated.) and Ranger (Note: CVW-2 (NE) embarked. Aircraft from VA-25, VA-113, VA-145, VF-21, VF-154, VAQ-134 and VAW-111 participated.) in the largest carrier night operation of the Vietnam War. (Note: Hancock, CVW-21 (NP) embarked, had arrived on the line that day and provided only two EKA-3B tanker aircraft of its VAQ-129 detachment to the diversion. Both staged before the raid to Da Nang Air Base, where TF77's Skywarriors were based during their carriers' rotations. Oriskany launched 25 aircraft and Ranger 26.) Starting at 01:52, 20 A-7 Corsairs and A-6 Intruders, flying in pairs at stepped-up altitudes to deconflict their flight paths, entered North Vietnamese airspace on three tracks, dropping flares to simulate an attack. The last track also dropped chaff to mimic the mining of Haiphong harbor. Over the Gulf of Tonkin, 24 other aircraft in 13 orbits provided support and protection. (Note: An additional support aircraft, an A-7 scheduled to be the last of six Surface to air missile (SAM) suppression aircraft, was a deck abort aboard Ranger.) The operation prompted a frantic air defense reaction at 02:17 that provided a highly effective diversion for the raiders and completely saturated the North Vietnamese air defense system.

Both USAF formations, over a period of thirteen minutes, were unavoidably but separately exposed for several minutes each to an early warning radar located at Na San, North Vietnam, 30 miles (48 km) to the north, because the flight tracks had to be routed around uncharted mountains. Neither formation was detected, possibly because of the diversion. The rescue forces entered the Red River valley at 500 feet (150 m) AGL to find conditions clear and visibility excellent. The helicopter formation reached its Initial Point (20 kilometers—12 minutes flying time—from Son Tây) with the A-1 strike formation two minutes behind, as planned. The HH-3E assault team helicopter had flown formation just behind and above the left wingtip of Cherry 01, drafting on the leader to gain the additional airspeed needed to bring its cruise airspeed safely above the stalling speed of the Combat Talon. Cherry 01 and the two HH-53s designated for prisoner pickup (Note: Apple 04 was initially tasked to drop backup flares should the main illumination fail to ignite. During the raid Apples 04 and 05 would "laager" together on an island in the middle of a large reservoir west of the camp, engines idling, to await a call to pick up the prisoners. (Gargus, p. 188)) accelerated to climb to 1,500 feet (460 m) AGL, while the four assault helicopters broke formation and descended to 200 feet (61 m) in single file, timed to land forty-five seconds apart.

=== Combat assault ===
At 02:18 Cherry 01 transmitted the execute command "Alpha, Alpha, Alpha" to all aircraft as it overflew the prison and deployed four illumination flares, (Note: Gargus states (p. 80) that these were time-fused Mk24 parachute flares, "designed to provide illumination in the two-million candlepower range for an average of ... 3 minutes." Each 3 feet (0.91 m) long 27 pound aluminum canister was deployed by hand out the lowered back ramp of the C-130 using a 40 feet (12 m) steel lanyard to deploy the parachute and safely ignite the flare. (Flare Aircraft: Parachute Mk24)) then performed a hard-turning descent to 500 feet (150 m) to drop two battle simulators (Note: Battle simulators were firecrackers encased in plastic sleeves and attached to a droppable pallet.) south and southeast of Sơn Tây. After Apple 03 made its strafing pass with side-firing miniguns on the prison's guard towers, (Note: Apple 03 experienced and ignored a main transmission warning light during its run. (Gargus, p. 189)) Cherry 01 successfully dropped one of two planned napalm ground markers as a point of reference for the A-1s, then departed the objective area to a holding point over Laos where it would provide UHF direction-finding steers for the departing aircraft.

The assault helicopters in single file encountered winds that caused them to break formation 150 yards (140 m) to the right of their intended track. The pilots of Apple 03, the gunship helicopter preceding the others, observed a compound nearly identical to the prison camp in size and layout (previously labeled a "secondary school" by intelligence sources) and steered toward it, followed by the assault lift force. However, they recognized their error when they saw the river next to the actual location and corrected their flight path. Banana, the HH-3E carrying the Blueboy assault team, descended on the wrong location and observed that the expected courtyard was much smaller than required and that the expected treeline enclosed the compound rather than crossing through it. By that time, Blueboy (as previously rehearsed) was firing its weapons from all openings in the helicopter. (Note: Blueboy used one M-60 machine gun and ten CAR-15s during the insertion, with all ammunition consisting of tracer rounds for maximum psychological impact on the camp guards. (Gargus, p. 27)) Banana's pilots also recognized the error, applied power and quickly veered north to the actual target.

Despite the error and trees taller than briefed that forced a steeper descent than rehearsed, the assault team crash-landed into the courtyard of Sơn Tây prison at 02:19 (Note: Gargus has a detailed timeline, all times based on the time of the Alpha execute code (02:18).) with all weapons firing. Although one raider, acting as a door gunner, was thrown from the aircraft, (Note: 1LT George Petrie landed on his feet near the east gate, which was his personal assignment to secure.) the only casualty was the helicopter's flight engineer, whose ankle was fractured by a dislodged fire extinguisher. (Note: The casualty was Air Force TSG Leroy Wright, who continued his participation despite the broken ankle and received the Air Force Cross for his effort.) Army Captain Richard J. Meadows used a bullhorn to announce their presence to the expected POWs, while the team dispersed in four elements on a rapid and violent assault of the prison, killing guards and methodically searching the five prisoner blocks cell by cell. (Note: This assault phase confirmed 42 PAVN soldiers killed at the prison site by cross-checking individual Blueboy and Redwine personnel accounts at debriefing. All other counts are estimates.)

Also at 02:19, Apple 01 (after its pilots saw Banana fire on the first location) landed the Greenleaf support group outside the south side of the secondary school, thinking it to be the target prison compound. Unaware that it was 400 meters from the objective, it lifted off to relocate to its holding area. The "secondary school" was actually a barracks for troops (Note: Traditionally, the troops are identified as Chinese or possibly Russian (Schemmer, pp. 171 and 214). However, one raider states they were PAVN (Buckler, interviewed Vietnam magazine June 1997—see external links), while another (Powell, also linked) asserts that their nationality was never determined.) that, alerted by Banana's aborted assault, opened fire on Greenleaf as two of its elements assaulted the compound. The support group attacked the location with small arms and hand grenades in an eight-minute firefight, after which Simons estimated that 100 to 200 hostile soldiers had been killed. Two A-1s supported Greenleaf with an air strike using white phosphorus bombs on a wooden footbridge east of the area. Apple 01 returned at 02:23, and by 02:28, the support group had disengaged under fire and reboarded the helicopter for the short movement to the correct landing area. (Note: Schemmer noted that Apple 01 made three combat assault landings in nine and one half minutes. The disengagement was supported by fire from the team's M-60 machine gun, which used all tracer rounds to intimidate the opponents.)

The pilot of Apple 02 observed the errors in navigation by the helicopters in front of him and made a hard turn towards the prison. He also observed Apple 01 unload at the secondary school and initiated Plan Green, the contingency plan for the loss or absence of Greenleaf. The Redwine security group, including ground force commander Sydnor, landed at 02:20 outside Sơn Tây prison and immediately executed the previously rehearsed contingency plan. In the meantime, Cherry 02 arrived with the A-1 force, dropped two more napalm ground markers, and created other diversions to disguise the target area by dropping MK-6 log flares and battle simulators at road intersections that North Vietnamese reaction forces might be expected to use. Cherry 02 then orbited in the area just west of the Black River acting as on-call support for the ground teams, jamming North Vietnamese radio communications, and providing a secure radio link to the mission command post in Da Nang. (Note: Each orbit, anchored on the original IP, took four minutes to complete. When it reversed course to complete its first orbit, Cherry 02 found it was being tracked by a Fire Can AAA radar. The signal faded when Cherry 02 reversed again to begin its second orbit, but when the Fire Can was detected again coming back to the anchor point, Cherry 02 relocated its orbit to a backup area 15 miles (24 km) to the north. (Gargus, pp. 218–220))

After a thorough search that included a second sweep ordered by Meadows, Blueboy's three teams found that the prison held no POWs. (Note: Meadows himself did not enter any cellblock but coordinated his team from the center of the courtyard.) Meadows transmitted the code phrase "Negative Items" to the command group. (Note: Sources are near-unanimous that the code was "items", not "packages".) Pathfinders clearing the extraction landing zone blew up an electrical tower that blacked out the entire west side of Sơn Tây including the prison area. At 02:29, Sydnor ordered the A-1s to attack the vehicle bridge over the Song Con leading into the area and, three minutes later, called for extraction by the HH-53s idling on the ground in a holding area a mile away. Before the first helicopter arrived, a truck convoy approached the prison from the south, but was stopped by two Redwine security teams that each fired an M72 light antitank weapon into the lead vehicle. (Note: The convoy was engaged separately by the teams, four minutes apart.)

At 02:28, Cherry 02's electronic warfare operator noted that Fan Song fire control radars for North Vietnamese SA-2 SAM sites had gone active. SAM launches at the F-105 Wild Weasel force began at 02:35, with at least 36 missiles fired at the rescue forces. (Note: Participants anecdotally put the number of SAMs much higher, with three or more in the air continuously for eleven minutes.) One F-105 was briefly enveloped in burning fuel by a near-miss at 02:40 and returned to base. Its replacement was severely damaged six minutes later by another SAM. Twenty other SAMs fired at Navy aircraft all missed. Two MiG-21 interceptors on alert duty at Phúc Yên Air Base were never given permission to launch, despite several requests to do so.

=== Extraction of the raiders ===
The HH-53s returned singly to the extraction landing zone amidst the SAM barrage, flying well below the minimum effective level of the missiles, and Apple 01 landed first at 02:37. It lifted off with its passengers at 02:40, followed a minute later by the landing of Apple 02, which departed at 02:45. Apple 03, the last aircraft out, was cleared to leave its holding area at 02:48. The raid had been executed in only 27 minutes, (Note: Raid time calculated from 02:18 (execute command) to 02:45 (last extraction).) well within the planned 30-minute optimum time. Although at first it was feared one raider had been left behind, all the troopers were accounted for. One Redwine trooper had been wounded in the leg and was the only casualty to hostile fire on the raid. (Note: SFC Joseph M. Murray was hit from behind as he prepared to grenade the first structure he encountered after debarking Apple 02. His assailants were killed by team leader MSG Herman Spencer.)

Shortly after its departure, Apple 03 mistook a support fighter for a MiG and called a warning, and although one of the Combat Apple KC-135s supporting the mission issued information that no MiGs had taken off, the entire force descended to treetop altitude. Apple 04 reported that an air-to-air missile had been launched at it and missed, but this was later found to have been aerial rockets fired into a hillside by one of the A-1 escorts, jettisoning ordnance to increase maneuverability as a result of the erroneous MiG call.

The assault formation was out of North Vietnam by 03:15 and landed back at Udorn at 04:28, five hours after launch. The crew of the damaged F-105 was compelled to eject over northern Laos, thirty minutes after being hit and within sight of its tanker, when its engine flamed out from lack of fuel. (Note: The F-105G lost was Firebird 05, s/n 62-4436, nicknamed Fat Fanny.) Alleycat, the C-130E Airborne Control and Command (ABCCC) aircraft in orbit at the time over northern Laos, coordinated with several USAF entities, including Brigham Control in Thailand (Note: Brigham was Detachment 4, 621st Tactical Support Squadron, located at Udorn, a radar site.) and ground resources in Laos, to cover the downed crewmen with supporting aircraft until a search and rescue effort could be mounted. Lime 01, refueling at Udorn, took off again using the call sign King 21 to coordinate the recovery, while Lime 02 refueled Apple 04 and Apple 05 to extend their flight time. Supported by the C-123 Candlestick flare aircraft diverted from its station on another mission by Alleycat, a SAR force was launched, and when its A-1s arrived from Nakhon Phanom to cover the pickups, Apple 04 and Apple 05 each recovered one of the downed airmen at first light after three hours on the ground.

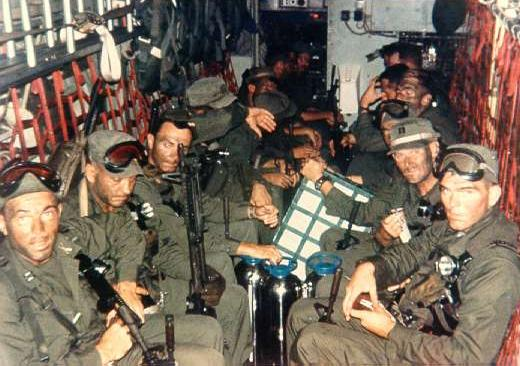
Blueboy assault group aboard HH-3E at the start of the mission. CPT Richard Meadows is seated in the left foreground. (Note: As a security measure, insignia of rank was not worn by JCTG members in Thailand until after the raid was launched. Also note the scaling ladder in the upper left and three extra fire extinguishers carried aboard the assault helicopter.)

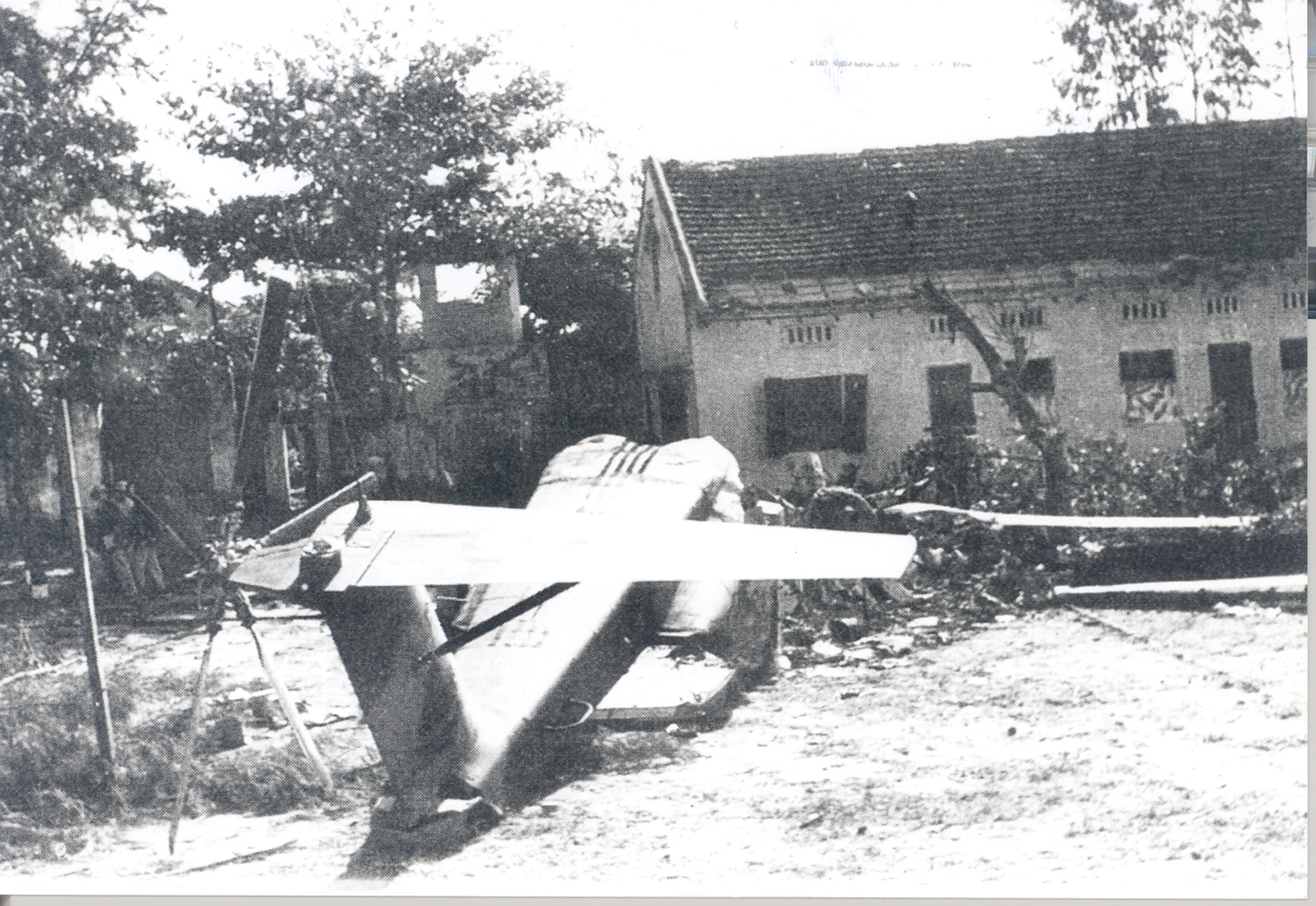
HH-3E in prison compound looking east. The guard tower is directly over the east entrance gate.

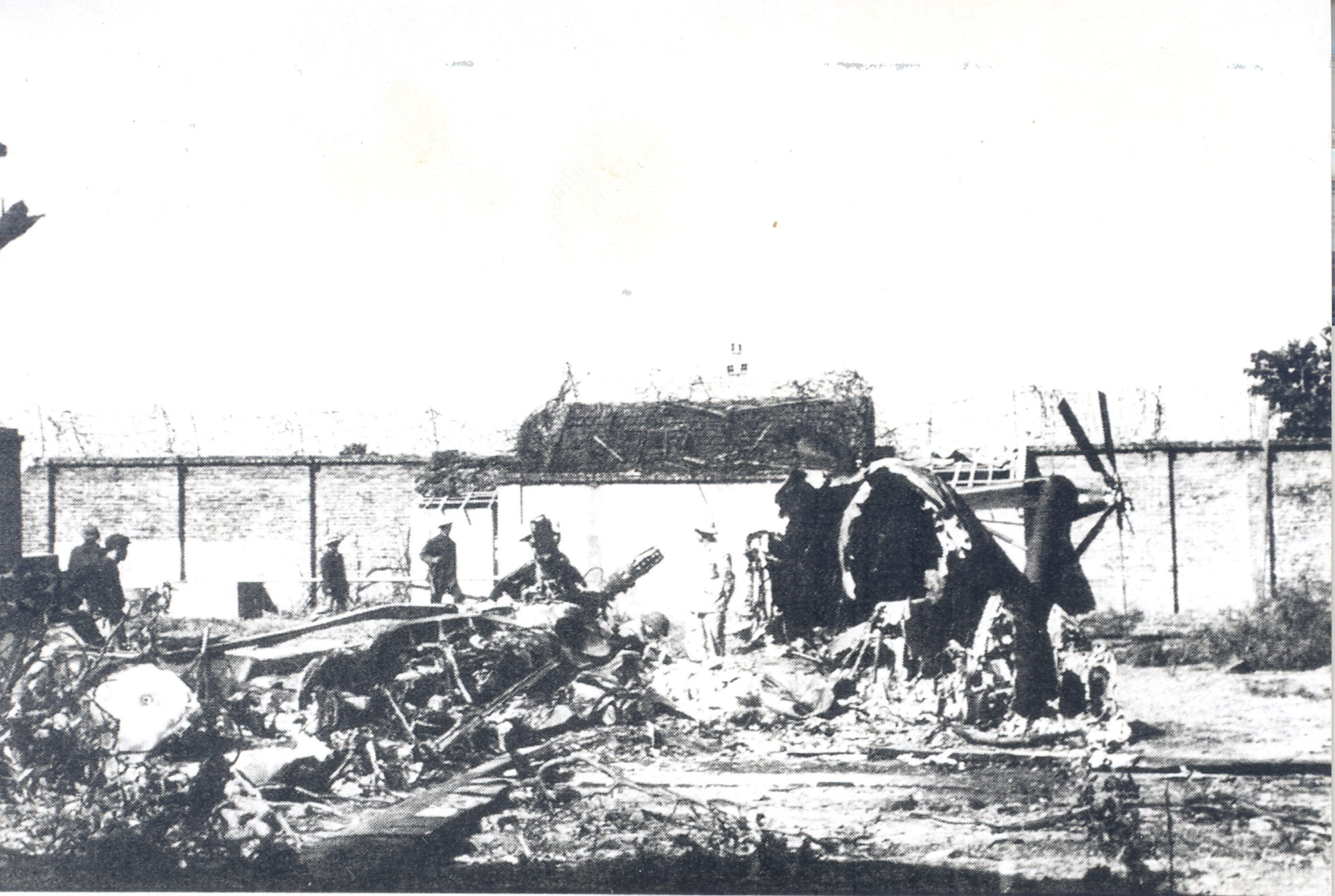
Wreckage of HH-3E looking toward west compound wall, with the river beyond.

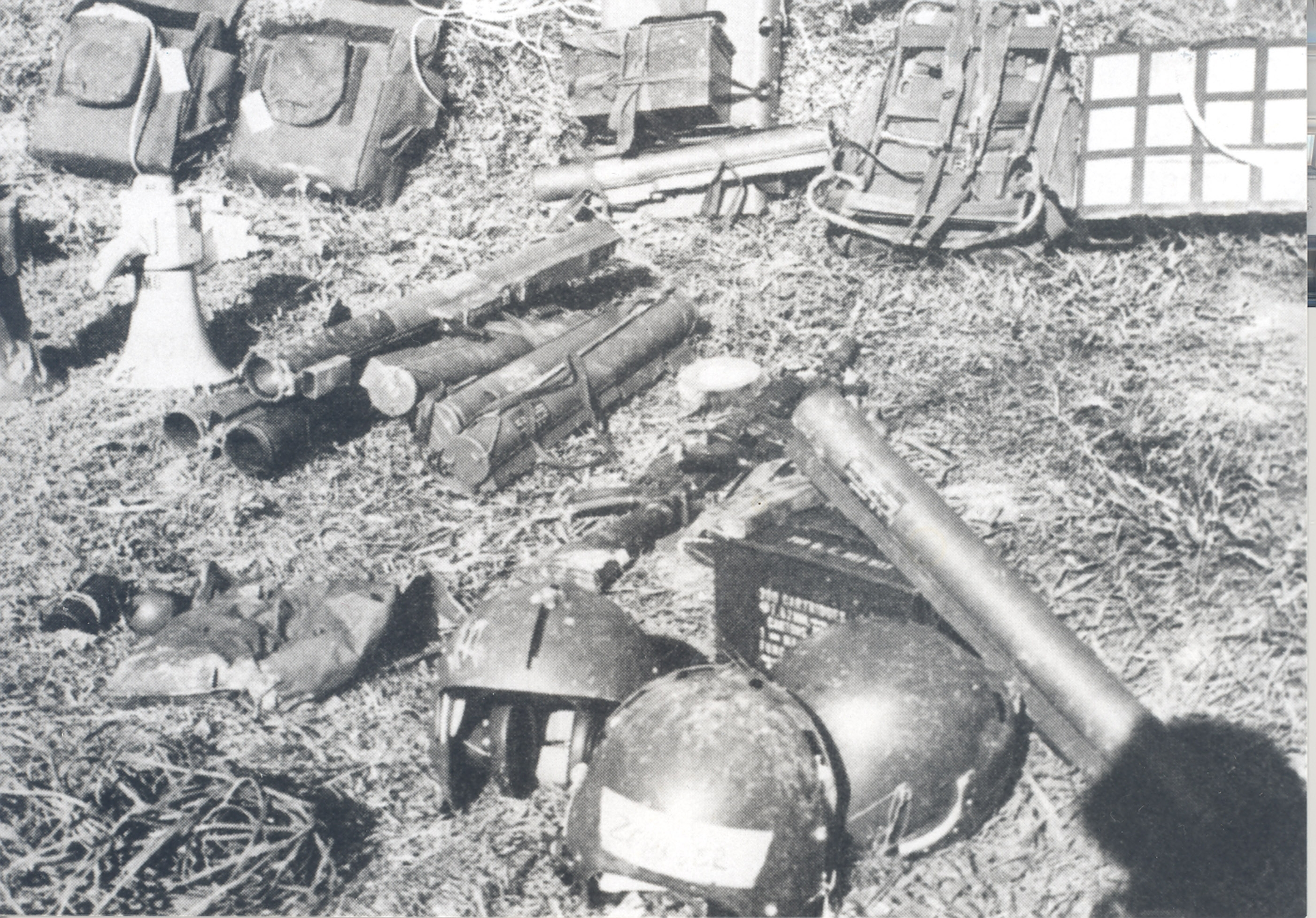
Equipment left behind by Sơn Tây raiders.

== Aftermath ==
=== Intelligence controversy ===
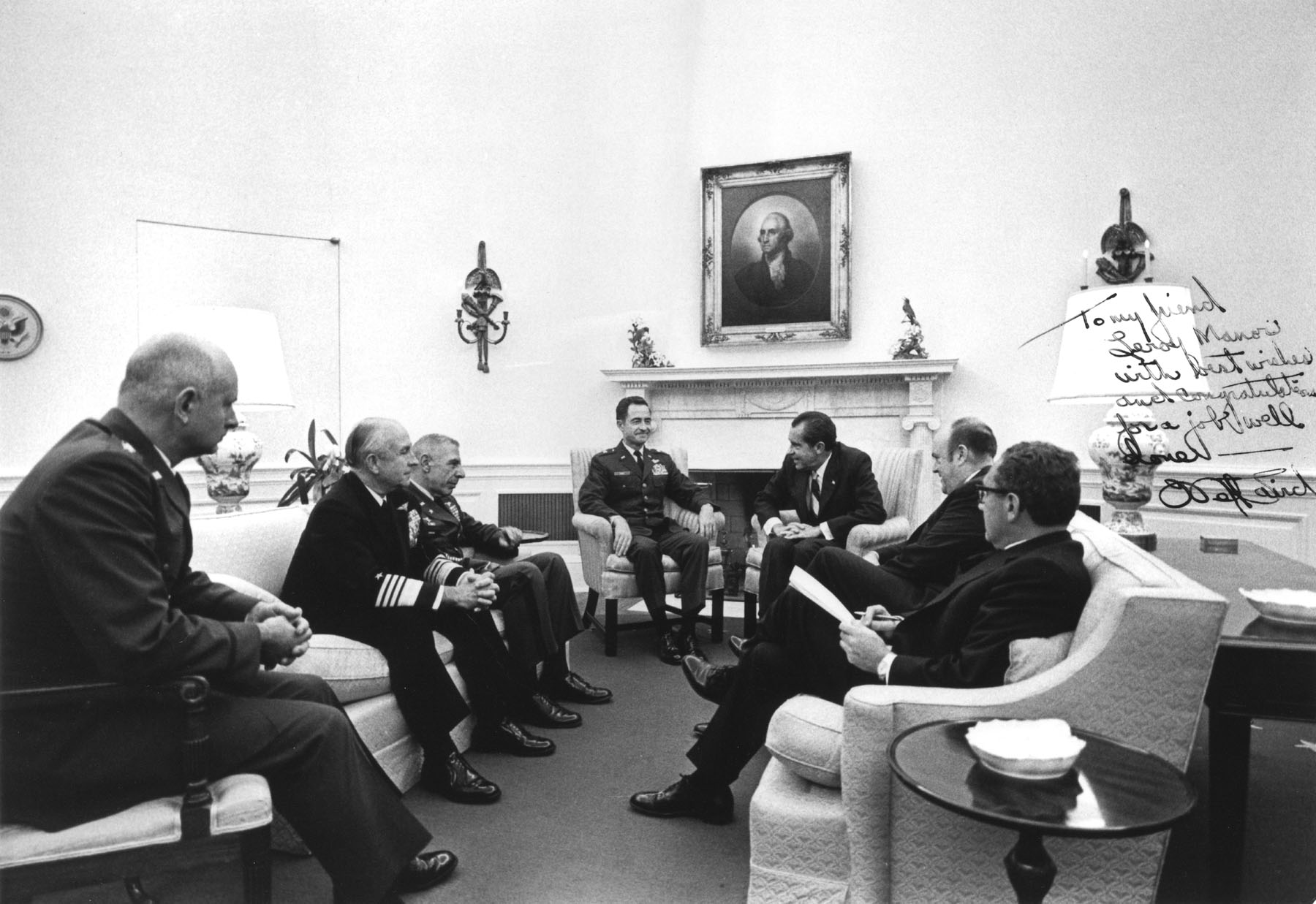
Post-raid Oval Office debriefing of Simons and Manor (3rd and 4th from left respectively)

While the mission was deemed a "tactical success" because of its execution and the message it conveyed, critics proclaimed it an "intelligence failure". The 65 prisoners at Sơn Tây had been moved on 14 July because its wells had become unusable possibly due to contamination by flooding, to a camp 15 miles (24 km) closer to Hanoi that the POWs dubbed "Camp Faith". (Note: Thigpen notes, however, that the senior POW in North Vietnam, USAF Colonel John P. Flynn, contends that the move was due to construction at the camp to improve its security, after which the prisoners were to have been returned. "Camp Faith" was so dubbed because Hanoi separated Protestant from Catholic prisoners in the mistaken belief that it would facilitate worship by each group and thus garner praise from the international community. (Tilford, p. 104)) The existence of "Camp Faith" (Dong Hoi) was only revealed to US intelligence on Thursday November 19th, 1970, in a coded message from Nguyen Van Hoang, an intelligence source in North Vietnam. Although relatively near Sơn Tây, the risk of disastrous consequences from lack of reconnaissance, planning and rehearsing precluded a switch of targets at the last minute. A mission with Camp Faith as the objective required a lengthy delay for a new window of acceptable conditions, (Note: Moorer advised Nixon at their November 18 meeting that the next window would be in March 1971, four months hence.) which increased the chance of security compromise and further withheld personnel and equipment from their parent commands. New reports of increasing numbers of deaths among POWs argued strongly against such a delay. The raid went as planned in the event that the renewed activity at Sơn Tây noted in aerial reconnaissance photos taken 13 November involved POWs.

Despite the mission's intelligence shortcomings, the gathering of accurate intelligence for the operation, in both quality and quantity, was remarkably successful. The shortcomings lay in "compartmentalization" of the information and isolation of the JTCG from "the normal intelligence flow". As early as the Polar Circle feasibility group, which conducted its capability assessment at the Defense Intelligence Agency's Arlington Hall facility rather than the Pentagon, members of the rescue operation were isolated from contact with outside organizations and closely monitored to prevent accidental leaks to the curious that might irreparably harm security. In his history of the operation, John Gargus, a planner and participant, has no evidence that anyone in the intelligence community knew the POWs had been removed from the Son Tay Camp. However he conceded the possibility of the existence of compartmented scraps of intelligence of such a nature: "We concede that the raid was allowed to take place because those who had the correct intelligence information were not aware that someone was contemplating a POW rescue."

By the time the only intelligence implying the lack of prisoners at Son Tay was received (the coded message in a pack of cigarettes which listed POW camps and the number of POWs in each—with no mention of Son Tay), prompting the Defense Intelligence Agency to do an intensive overnight re-analysis of all of its data, it was the day before the raid would launch. The finished overnight report was presented to the commanders (including Admiral Moorer) the day of the operation. The operation had been advanced 24 hours due to Typhoon Patsy and there was a 12-hour time difference with Southeast Asia. When a final meeting with Defense Secretary Laird took place at 05:00 (Washington, D.C., time) to determine if the mission should proceed, its launch was less than five hours away. There was no consensus on the reliability of the data and Blackburn was strongly predisposed to go ahead. One military analyst theorized that as a result, the highest-level decision makers succumbed to the phenomenon of "groupthink".

The Defense Department conducted an investigation into a possible breach of security as the reason behind the movement of the prisoners and concluded that none occurred. The intensity of the criticism, and leaks of information including reports of the operation, caused the Nixon Administration to reorganize both the military communications network and the government's intelligence apparatus.

=== Recognition of participants ===
For their actions, members of the task force received six Distinguished Service Crosses, (Note: DSCs were awarded to Simons, Sydnor, Meadows, MSG Thomas J. Kemmer (Blueboy), SFC Tyrone J. Adderly (Redwine), and SSG Thomas E. Powell (Greenleaf). (Schemmer, p. 259).) five Air Force Crosses, (Note: AFCs were awarded to MAJ Herbert D. Kalen (Banana), LTC Warner A. Britton (Apple 01), LTC John V. Allison (Apple 02), MAJ Frederic M. Donahue (Apple 03), and TSG Leroy M. Wright (Banana). (Schemmer, p. 260).) and at least 85 Silver Stars, including all members of the ground force who did not receive the DSC. (Note: The following Army Special Forces soldiers were awarded the Silver Star for heroism as part of the ground force that landed in North Vietnam; CAPT Thomas W. Jaeger, CAPT James W. McClam, CAPT Dan H. McKinney, CAPT Eric J. Nelson, CAPT Glenn R. Rouse, CAPT Daniel D. Turner, CAPT Udo H. Walther, 1LT George W. Petrie, Jr., MSG Galen C. Kittleson, MSG Joseph W. Lupyak, MSG Billy K. Moore. MSG Herman Spencer, SFC Donald D. Blackard, SFC Earl Bleacher, Jr., SFC Leroy N. Carlson, SFC Anthony Dodge, SFC Freddie D. Doss, SFC Jerry W. Hill, SFC Marion S. Howell, SFC John Jakovenko, SFC Jack G. Joplin, SFC Daniel Jurich, SFC David A. Lawhon, Jr., SFC Gregory T. McGuire, SFC Billy R. Martin, SFC Charles A. Masten, SFC Donald R. Wingrove, SFC Joseph M. Murray, SFC Noe Quezada, SFC Lorenzo O. Robbins, SFC Ronnie Strahan, SFC Salvador M. Suarez, SFC Donald E. Taapken, SFC William L. Tapley, SFC Richard W. Valentine, SSG Charles G. Erickson, SSG Kenneth E. McMullin, SSG Walter L. Miller, SSG Robert F. Nelson, SSG David Nickerson, SSG Paul F. Poole, SSG John E. Rodriquez, SSG Lawrence Young, SGT Terry L. Buckler, SGT Gary D. Keel, SGT Keith R. Medenski, SGT Franklin D. Roe, SGT Patrick St. Clair and SGT Marshal A. Thomas.) (Note: It is probable that 102 Silver Stars were actually awarded as a result of Kingpin. Schemmer apparently gave an incomplete record of SS recipients, listing all of the crew members of Cherry 02 but only two members of Cherry 01. His list of helicopter crewmen likewise omits seven who did not participate in training at Eglin and thus were not on the original JCTG rosters. Likely these are omissions in research and those 17 crewmen were also awarded Silver Stars.) Manor received the Distinguished Service Medal. A total of 49 soldiers were awarded the Silver Star for heroism. The successful demonstrations of joint operating capability in Ivory Coast and Kingpin were, in part, a model for the creation of a joint United States Special Operations Command in 1987.

=== Impact of the raid ===
Criticism of the raid, particularly in the news media and by political opponents of the Vietnam War and the Nixon Administration, was widespread and of long duration. Not only was the mission denounced as the result of poor or outdated intelligence, but charges were made that the operation caused increased mistreatment of the prisoners.

However, as a result of the raid, the North Vietnamese consolidated their POW camps to central prison complexes. An area of the Hanoi Hilton formerly housing civilian and South Vietnamese prisoners became "Camp Unity", a block of large communal areas housing 50 POWs each. After their repatriation, many POWs said that being in close contact with other Americans lifted their morale, as did knowledge of the rescue attempt. (Note: Schemmer devotes an entire chapter to the positive effects of the raid on the prisoners' situation.) Some POWs said that food, medical care and even seemingly basic things like mail delivery vastly improved after the raid.

== See also ==
- Ban Naden raid

== Notes ==
Footnotes

== Bibliography ==
- Amidon, Mark. "Groupthink, Politics, and the Decision to Attempt the Son Tay Rescue". Parameters, Journal of the US Army War College. 2005 (Winter). Archived from the original on July 23, 2006.
- Hill, John M. Campbell & Michael (1996). Roll Call : THUD : a photographic record of the F-105 Thunderchief. Atglen, PA: Schiffer Pub. ISBN 0-7643-0062-8.
- Gargus, John (2007). The Son Tay Raid : American POWs in Vietnam Were Not Forgotten (1. ed.). College Station: Texas A & M Univ. Press. ISBN 978-1-58544-622-3.
- Glines, Carroll V. (November 1995). "The Son Tay Raid". Air & Space Forces Magazine. Vol. 78, no. 11. Archived from the original on 28 September 2025.
- Mitchell, Major John, USMC (1997). "The Son Tay Raid: A Study in Presidential Policy". e-History: Vietnam War. The Ohio State University.
- Schemmer, Benjamin F. (1976). The Raid. Harper & Row. ISBN 0-553-75625-7.
- Thigpen, Jerry L. (2001). The Praetorian STARShip : the untold story of the Combat Talon. Maxwell Air Force Base, Ala.: Air University Press. ISBN 1-58566-103-1.
- Thomas, William C. (Spring 1997). "Operation Kingpin – Success or Failure?" (PDF). Joint Force Quarterly (15). Archived from the original (PDF) on 2013-11-11.
- Tilford, Earl H. Jr. (1980). Search and Rescue in Southeast Asia, 1961–1975. Office of Air Force History/CreateSpace Independent Publishing Platform. ISBN 978-1477547434.

Websites

- "A-1 participation in the Son Tay raid, 21 November 1970". Jolly Green.org. Archived from the original on 4 July 2008.
- "Call Sign "Apple 1"". NMUSAF. Archived from the original on 2015-04-09.
- Manor, Brig. Gen. Leroy J. "The Son Tay Raid, November 21, 1970". Air Commando Association. Archived from the original on 9 February 2007.
