= 835th Air Division =

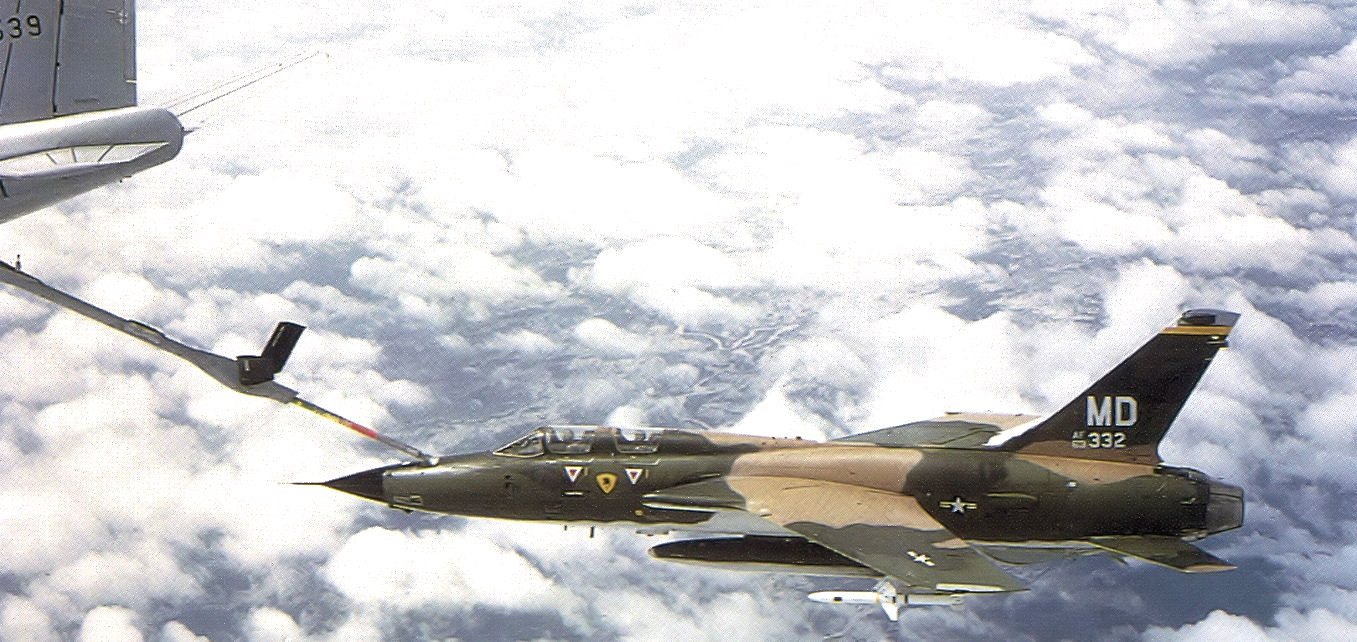
- F-105 Thunderchief of the 23d Tactical Fighter Wing (Note: Aircraft shown is Republic F-105F-1-RE, serial 63-8332 of the 561st Tactical Fighter Squadron. This plane was later upgraded to F-105G configuration. Transferred to the Georgia Air National Guard in 1982 and sent to Aberdeen Proving Ground for use as a target in March 1983. Baugher, Joe (26 July 2023). "1963 USAF Serial Numbers". Joe Baugher. Photo taken in 1968.)
- Active: 1964–1971
- Country: United States
- Branch: United States Air Force
- Role: Command of tactical fighter and reconnaissance forces

Commanders
- Notable commanders: Lt Gen Leroy J. Manor

Insignia
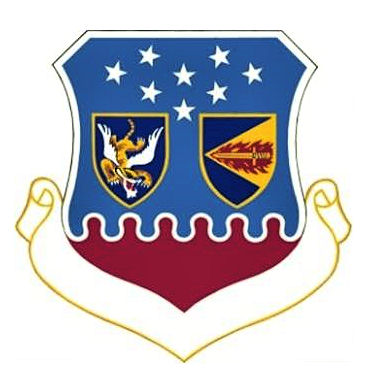
- 835th Air Division emblem (Note: Approved 20 May 1966. Description: Medium blue in chief eight mullets reversed chevronwise of two rows three and five argent and in fess two escutcheons azure fimbriated or, first bearing in pale throughout a "Flying Tiger" or striped brown armed and winged argent and on the second, a pile issuant from sinister throughout or, charged with a dagger fesswise of the like [color] inflamed gules, all within a diminished bordure argent and over all a base nebuly gules fimbriated argent. The emblem includes the emblems for the division's first two wings, the 23d and 355th Tactical Fighter Wings. Ravenstein, pp. 45, 191.)

The 835th Air Division is an inactive United States Air Force (USAF) organization. Its last assignment was to Twelfth Air Force of Tactical Air Command (TAC) at McConnell Air Force Base, Kansas, where it was inactivated on 30 June 1971.

The division was activated at McConnell in July 1964 in anticipation of the activation of a second Republic F-105 Thunderchief wing there. The division was the command headquarters for the TAC wings at McConnell and provided support for USAF units there until November 1965, when the 355th Tactical Fighter Wing moved to Southeast Asia and the 23d Tactical Fighter Wing assumed support duties. The 23d Wing continued to deploy units to the Pacific and train both active duty and Air National Guard pilots on the Thunderchief.

At various times, the 835th also commanded a reconnaissance wing and a McDonnell F-4 Phantom II wing, both located on other bases. During the Pueblo Crisis, a mobilized Air National Guard wing was assigned to the division and deployed its squadrons to the Pacific to perform reconnaissance missions.

== History ==
The 835th Air Division was activated at McConnell Air Force Base, Kansas on 1 July 1964 as the command headquarters for the 23d Tactical Fighter Wing already stationed there and the 355th Tactical Fighter Wing, which was activated at McConnell later that month. Both wings were equipped with the Republic F-105 Thunderchief. The division's 835th Combat Support Group assumed duty as the host organization for McConnell from the 23d Combat Support Group, providing support for all United States Air Force units at McConnell and operating support aircraft. The division trained in close air support and air defense missions and participated in joint operations. The division's wings frequently deployed their tactical squadrons overseas, primarily to Southeast Asia.

In November 1965, the 355th Wing moved to Takhli Royal Thai Air Force Base, leaving behind two of its squadrons, the 354th and 357th Tactical Fighter Squadrons. Until they could rejoin the wing in Thailand, these two squadrons were temporarily assigned directly to the division . The departure of the 355th left McConnell with only a single wing, and base support responsibilities were transferred from the division back to the 23d Wing.

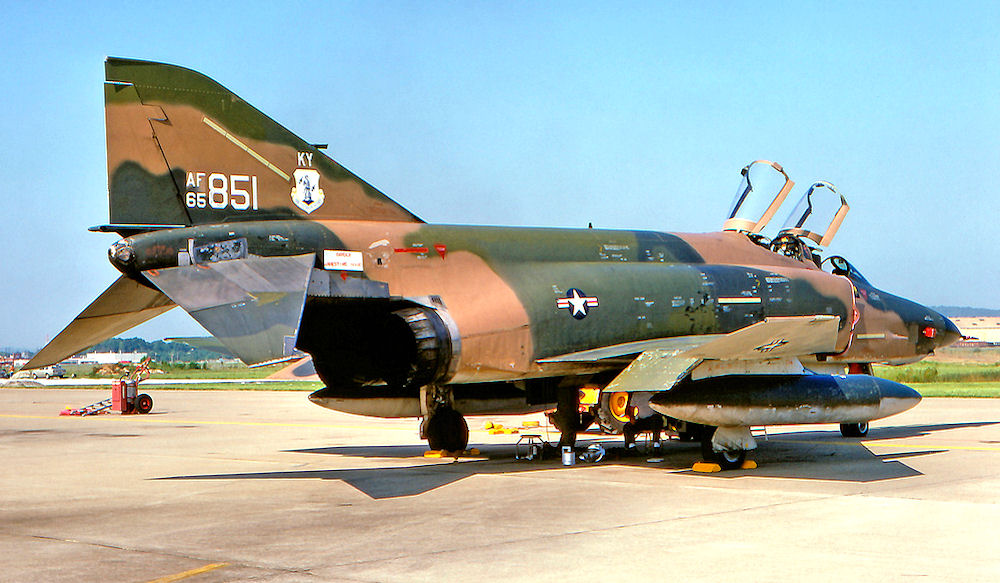
RF-4C Phantom II (Note: Aircraft is McDonnell RF-4C-25-MC Phantom II serial 65-0851 of the 123d Tactical Reconnaissance Wing's 165th Tactical Reconnaissance Squadron.)

At the beginning of 1966, the division's remaining wing, the 23d, added the mission to train F-105 aircrews, primarily for duty in Southeast Asia. After seven months with only a single wing assigned, the 75th Tactical Reconnaissance Wing, located at Bergstrom Air Force Base, Texas was assigned to the division. The 75th was organized as TAC took over Bergstrom from Strategic Air Command. This wing was equipped with the McDonnell RF-4 Phantom II. In February 1967, it became a replacement training unit for the RF-4C aircraft.

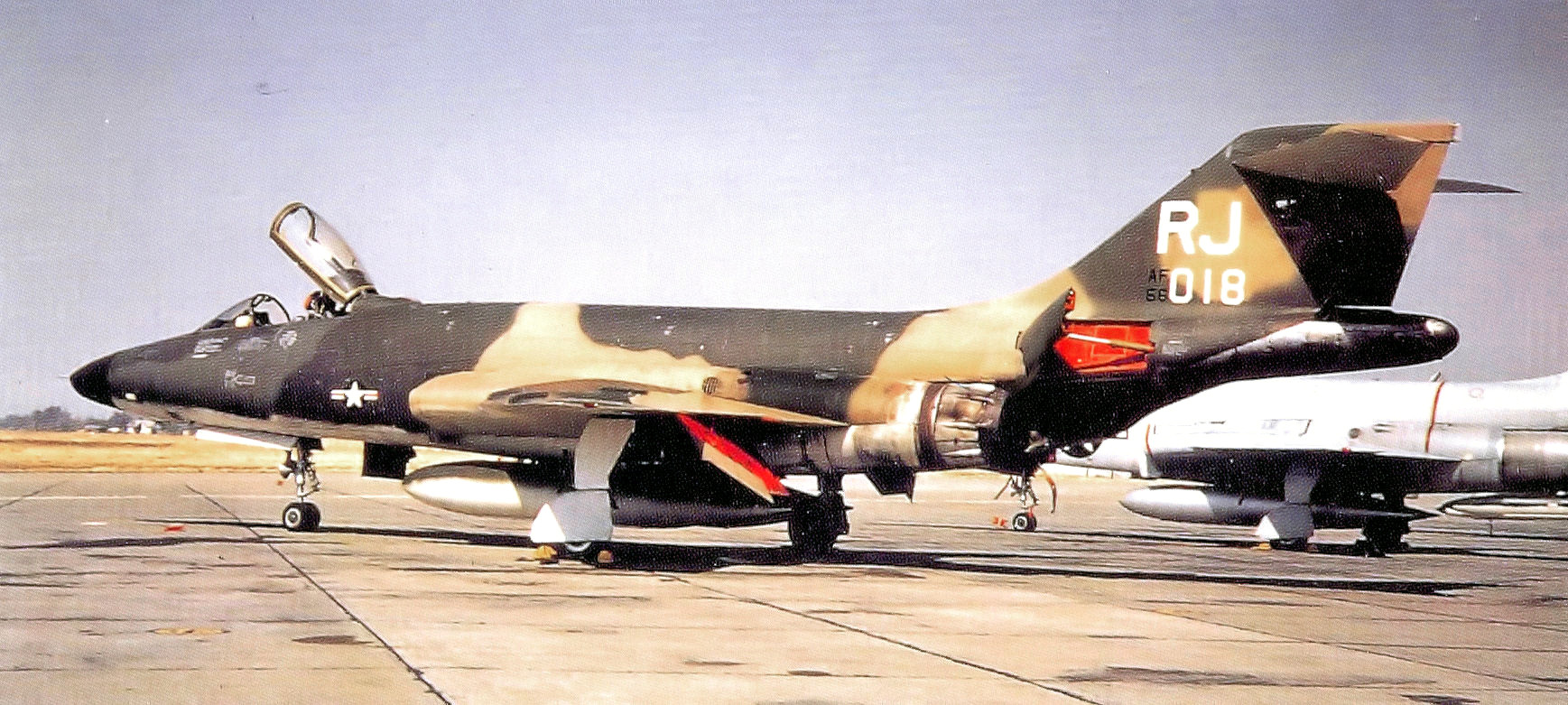
123d Tactical Reconnaissance Wing RF-101 (Note: Aircraft is McDonnell RF-101C-45-MC, serial 56-018 of the 192d Tactical Reconnaissance Squadron of the Nevada Air National Guard after being modified as an RF-101H. Sent to the Military Aircraft Storage and Disposition Center on 1 March 1972 and scrapped on 5 April 1977. Baugher, Joe (19 May 2023). "1956 USAF Serial Numbers". Joe Baugher. This squadron was federalized and assigned to the 123d Tactical Reconnaissance Wing. Taken in 1968.)

The 123d Tactical Reconnaissance Wing of the Kentucky Air National Guard was called to active duty in August 1968, along with squadrons from the Arkansas and Nevada Air National Guard. Its components moved from their home stations to Richards-Gebaur Air Force Base, Missouri with their McDonnell RF-101 Voodoos. While on active duty, the wing deployed its Voodos to Misawa and Itazuke Air Bases in Japan. 123d elements deployed in the Pacific provided reconnaissance support for Operation Linebacker. The wing was returned to state control and its home station in the spring of 1969.

In December 1969, the 75th Tactical Reconnaissance Wing was transferred to Twelfth Air Force, leaving the division once again with a single wing assigned.

The division's final assigned wing was the 49th Tactical Fighter Wing, an F-4 Phantom II wing stationed at Holloman Air Force Base, New Mexico. The 49th Wing was reassigned to the wing two months after the 75th Wing was reassigned, on 1 February 1970. The 49th Wing was "dual-based" and committed to support of the North Atlantic Treaty Organization when called upon. From September to October, the entire wing deployed to its former base in Germany, Spangdahlem Air Base.

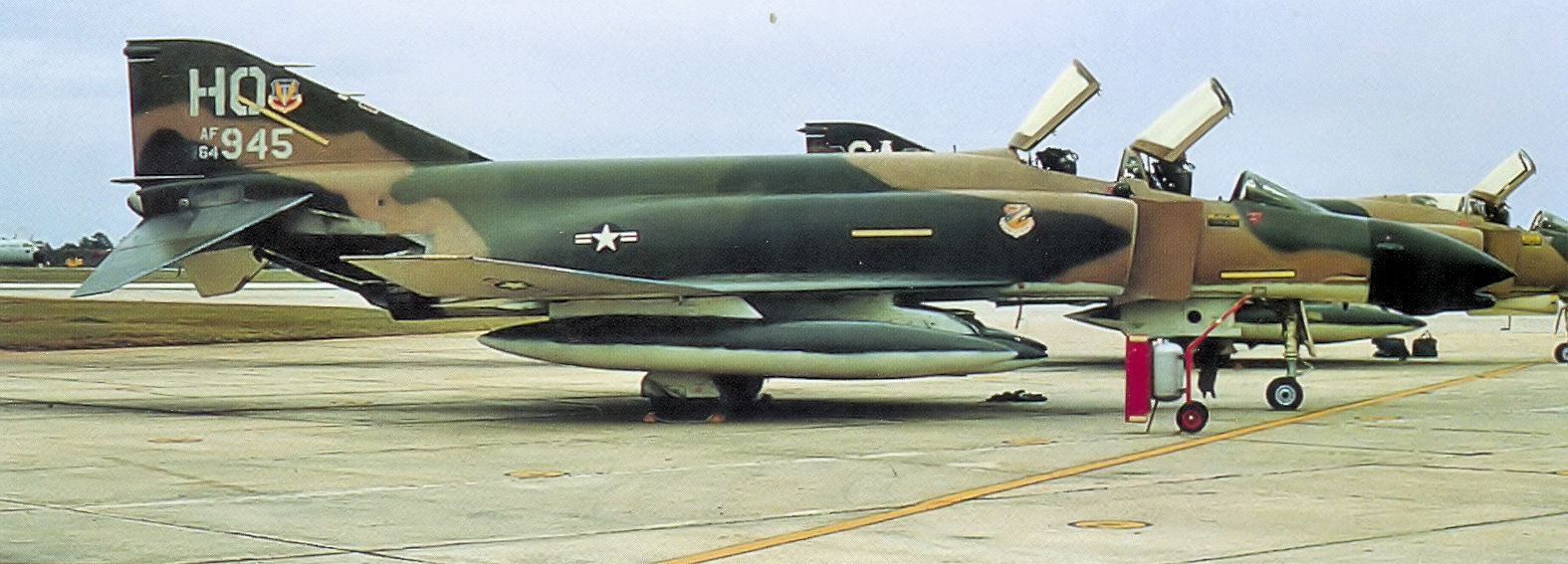
49th Tactical Fighter Wing F-4D (Note: Aircraft is McDonnell F-4D-25-MC Phantom II serial 64-0945 of the 49th Tactical Fighter Wing's 8th Tactical Fighter Squadron. This plane was transferred to the Aerospace Maintenance and Regeneration Center on 15 August 1989 and to Holloman AFB for use as a target on 17 December 1997. Baugher, Joe (15 July 2023). "1964 USAF Serial Numbers". Joe Baugher..)

In November 1970, as the USAF began to transfer portions of its Thunderchief inventory to the Air National Guard, the 23d Wing transferred the focus of its training mission to preparing National Guard pilots for their new aircraft. The 184th Tactical Fighter Group of the Kansas Air National Guard, which was also located at McConnell, became the first Guard unit to train on and equip with the Thunderchief.

The division was inactivated in June 1971 and its two wings were reassigned directly to Twelfth Air Force.

== Lineage ==
- Established as the 835 Air Division, and activated, on 24 June 1964

Organized on 1 July 1964
Inactivated on 30 June 1971

=== Assignments ===
- Tactical Air Command, 24 June 1964 (not organized until 1 July 1964)
- Twelfth Air Force, 23 July 1964 – 30 June 1971

=== Stations ===
- McConnell Air Force Base, Kansas, 1 July 1964 – 30 June 1971 (Note: Division components were also stationed at McConnell, except as noted.)

=== Components ===
Wings

- 23d Tactical Fighter Wing: 1 July 1964 – 30 June 1971
- 49th Tactical Fighter Wing: 1 February 1970 – 30 June 1971 (attached to Seventeenth Air Force 14 September – 7 October 1970)

Holloman Air Force Base, New Mexico

- 75th Tactical Reconnaissance Wing: 1 July 1966 – 24 December 1969

Bergstrom Air Force Base, Texas

- 123d Tactical Reconnaissance Wing: by 31 August 1968 – by 31 March 1969

Richards-Gebaur Air Force Base, Missouri

- 355th Tactical Fighter Wing: 21 July 1964 – 8 November 1965

Group

- 835th Combat Support Group,: 1 July 1964 – 8 June 1966

Squadrons

- 354th Tactical Fighter Squadron: 8 – 27 November 1965
- 357th Tactical Fighter Squadron: 8 November 1965 – 29 January 1966

Other

- 835th Tactical Hospital, 1 July 1965 – 1 July 1967

=== Aircraft ===
- Republic F-105 Thunderchief, 1964–1971
- Lockheed AT-33, 1966–1969
- McDonnell RF-4 Phantom II, 1966–1969
- McDonnell RF-101 Voodoo, 1968–1969
- North American T-39 Sabreliner, 1966–1971
- McDonnell F-4 Phantom II, 1970–1971

=== Award ===
- Major General Warren R. Carter Readiness Trophy. 1964. Awarded by the Order of Daedalians annually to the base level unit with the best supply record supporting aircraft or weapons as selected by the Chief of Staff, United States Air Force.

=== Commanders ===
- Col O.E. Gilbert, c. 1 July 1964
- Brig Gen Robert L. "Bob" Cardenas, c. 1 July 1966
- Col Woodward E. Davis Jr., 13 May 1968
- Col Leroy J. Manor, 21 June 1969
- Col Edward P. McNeff, 17 February 1970 – 30 Jun 71

== See also ==
- List of United States Air Force air divisions
- List of F-105 units of the United States Air Force
- List of F-4 Phantom II operators
