= Leroy J. Manor =

United States Air Force general (1921–2021)

Leroy Joseph Manor
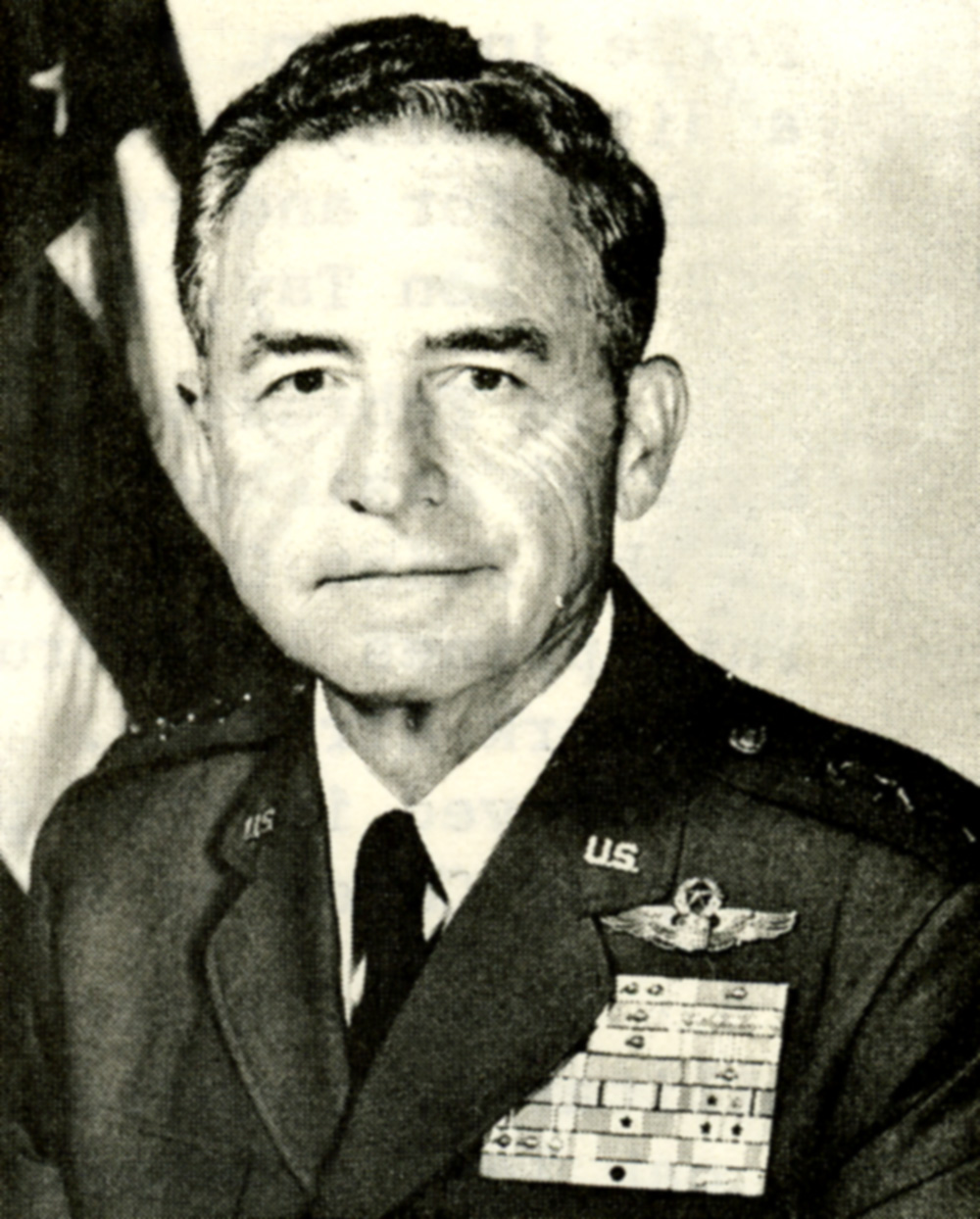
- Born: February 21, 1921; Morrisonville, New York, U.S.
- Died: February 25, 2021 (aged 100); Shalimar, Florida, U.S.
- Burial place: Barrancas National Cemetery
- Military career
- Allegiance: United States
- Branch: United States Army Air Forces; United States Air Force
- Service years: 1943–1978
- Rank: Lieutenant General
- Nickname: Roy
- Units: 358th Fighter Squadron; 100th Fighter Wing
- Commands: 13th Air Force; Air Force Special Operations Force; 835th Air Division; 37th Tactical Fighter Wing; 481st Tactical Fighter Squadron
- Conflicts: World War II; Vietnam War
- Awards: Air Force Distinguished Service Medal (4); Legion of Merit (2); Distinguished Flying Cross (2); Purple Heart

Leroy Joseph Manor (February 21, 1921 – February 25, 2021) was a United States Air Force lieutenant general who began his career serving as a P-47 fighter pilot in World War II, and in numerous command positions during the Vietnam War era. Manor is perhaps best known as the task force commander of Operation Ivory Coast, a special forces raid on the prisoner of war camp at Son Tay, Vietnam, on November 21, 1970.

== Early life ==
Born in Morrisonville, New York, on February 21, 1921, Manor graduated in 1937 from Cadyville High School, in Clinton County, New York. He received his Teacher's Certificate from New York State Normal School in 1940. Manor entered aviation cadet training in November 1942 and received his pilot wings and commission upon graduation in August 1943. During World War II, Manor flew 72 combat missions as a P-47 pilot with the 358th Fighter Squadron in Europe, and was later assigned to the 100th Fighter Wing, also in Europe.

== Military career ==
In September 1945, Captain Manor was assigned as a pilot at the Air Proving Grounds, Florida. He attended New York University during 1946–47 and received a Bachelor of Science degree in education. For the next six years, Manor was an instructor, first at Tactical Air School, Tyndall Air Force Base; next at the newly formed Squadron Officer School, Maxwell Air Force Base; and last at the Air-Ground Operations School, Southern Pines, North Carolina.

From September 1953 to June 1955, Major Manor was a staff officer with the 6th Allied Tactical Air Force (NATO) at İzmir, Turkey. He returned in July 1955 to assume command of the 2242d Air Reserve Flying Center at Selfridge Air National Guard Base, Michigan. Manor entered the Armed Forces Staff College in July 1958. Upon graduation, Manor was assigned in August 1959 to the 27th Tactical Fighter Wing, Cannon Air Force Base, New Mexico, where he commanded the 481st Tactical Fighter Squadron, equipped with the F-100 Super Sabre.

In July 1960, Manor transferred to Headquarters, United States Air Forces in Europe, where he was Chief, Tactical Evaluation Division, until July 1963, when he entered the Industrial College of the Armed Forces. In June 1964, Colonel Manor was assigned to Headquarters US Air Force in the Office of the Deputy Chief of Staff, Plans and Operations, where he served successively in the Directorate of Operations as Chief, Plans and Capabilities Branch; Chief, Analysis of Southeast Asia Operations Study Group; and as Chief, Operations Review Group.

In May 1968, he assumed command of the 37th Tactical Fighter Wing at Phu Cat Air Base, South Vietnam, where he completed 275 combat missions in F-100s, primarily in South Vietnam. In June 1969, he was named commander of the 835th Air Division at McConnell Air Force Base, Kansas. Brigadier General Manor became commander of the US Air Force Special Operations Force, precursor to the Air Force Special Operations Command, in February 1970.

In February 1971, Manor became Deputy Director for Operations/Special Assistant for Counterinsurgency and Special Activities, Joint Staff at Washington, D.C. He was transferred to the Philippines in February 1973 to become Vice Commander, 13th Air Force, Pacific Air Forces, at Clark Air Base. He was 13th Air Force Commander from October 1973 until October 1976, when assigned duty as Chief of Staff, Pacific Command. He was promoted to the grade of lieutenant general on November 1, 1976, with same date of rank. Manor served as the chief of staff, United States Pacific Command, from October 12, 1976 until his retirement from the Air Force on July 1, 1978. Following retirement, he represented the Joint Chiefs of Staff and CINCPAC as senior military negotiator and advisor to the US Ambassador to the Philippines for the Military Bases Agreement. He also was military advisor for an independent analysis of Operation Eagle Claw, the unsuccessful April 24, 1980, raid to rescue 52 Americans held during the Iran hostage crisis. Manor died on February 25, 2021, four days after his 100th birthday.

== Raid on Son Tay ==
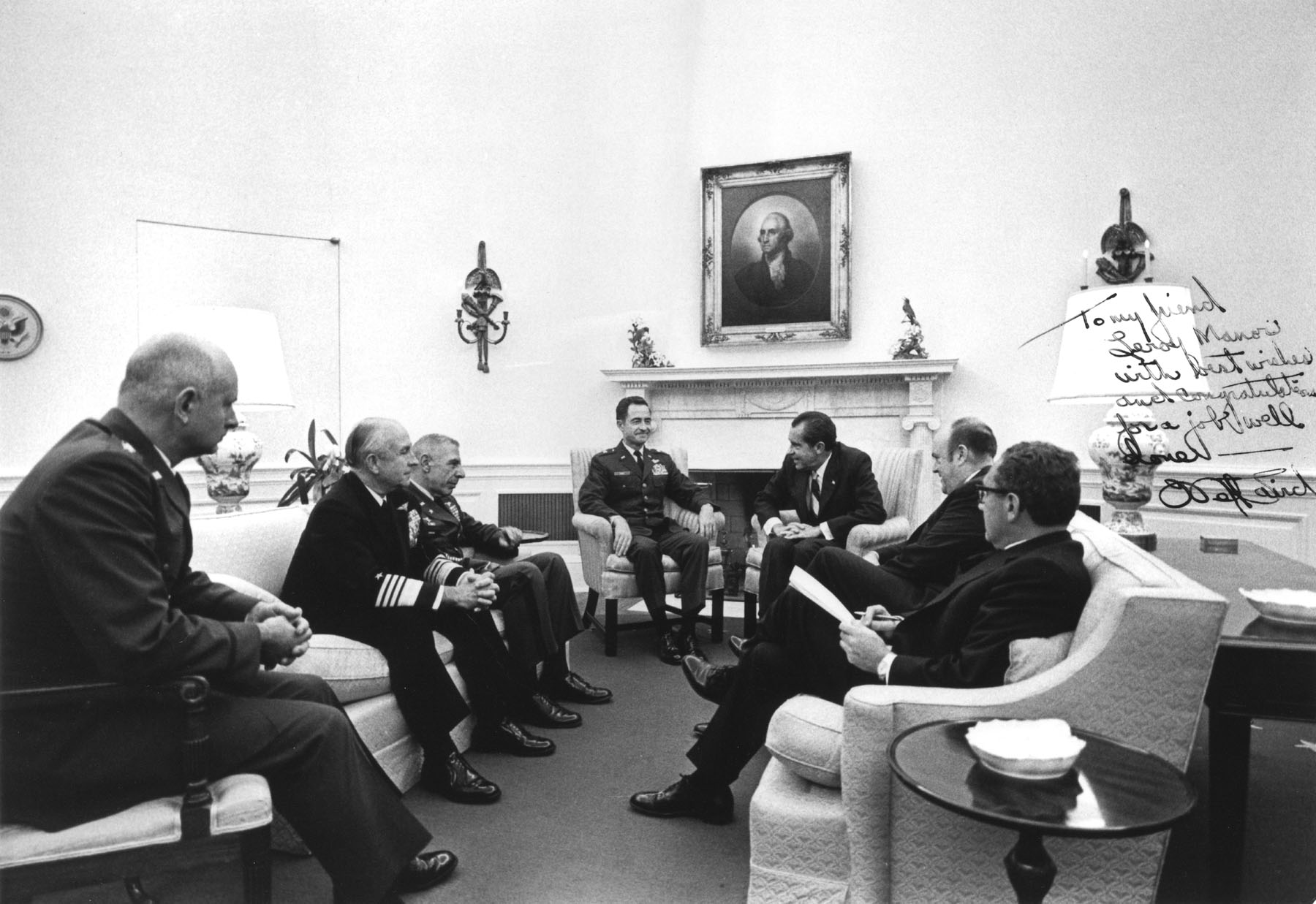
General Manor (4th from left) meets with President Nixon in the Oval Office to discuss the results of the raid on Son Tay

From August 8, 1970, to November 21, 1970, Manor served as a commander of a joint Army-Air Force task force whose mission was to rescue United States military personnel held as prisoners of war at Son Tay, North Vietnam. The preliminary planning phase of the operation was given the codename "Polar Circle", the organizational and training phase was named "Operation Ivory Coast", and the execution of the mission codenamed "Operation Kingpin".

The Joint Contingency Task Group was formed in June 1970 after American intelligence had identified Son Tay Prison, near Hanoi, as a prisoner of war detention camp. After five months of planning and rehearsals, the task force deployed to Thailand on November 18. Two nights later the task force flew into North Vietnam. The assault group, led by U.S. Army Capt. Dick Meadows, landed in the prison compound and killed about 50 NVA guards, but found the compound to be otherwise abandoned. Meanwhile, Colonel Arthur D. "Bull" Simons, deputy task force commander, had landed with the support group in an adjacent military school compound, which was teeming with Russian and Chinese soldiers. Simons and his team killed or repelled many of these soldiers, eliminating the principal threat to the assault group. The raiders executed the entire operation in 26 minutes, successfully faced an enemy force of approximately 350 men, and left with only 2 injuries.

Wording of the Distinguished Service Medal citation as presented by President Richard M. Nixon to Manor on November 25, 1970 for his planning of the raid on Son Tay:

Brigadier General Leroy J. Manor, United States Air Force, distinguished himself by exceptionally meritorious service to the United States in a duty of great responsibility while serving as the Commander of a Joint Task Force on 21 November 1970. General Manor commanded the humanitarian force whose mission was to search for and rescue United States military personnel held as prisoners of war deep within the territory of North Vietnam. He conceived a brilliant tactical plan, carefully selected and helped train the volunteers with the necessary expertise to carry it out. Over a period of three months, he repeatedly simulated each phase of the operation, thereby insuring its faultless execution. General Manor's brilliant talents of command and supervision resulted in a superbly trained joint task force. The mission was daring in concept, and bold in execution. General Manor directed the operation from his command post with the highest degree of professionalism. Despite great hazard, the operation was conducted without the loss of a single American life. The singular efforts and outstanding achievement of General Manor are in keeping with the highest traditions of the United States Air Force and reflect great credit upon himself and the United States Air Force.

== Awards and decorations ==
Manor earned a Command Pilot rating with more than 6,500 flying hours. His military decorations and awards included the Distinguished Service Medal with 3 Oak Leaf Clusters; Legion of Merit with one Oak Leaf Cluster; Distinguished Flying Cross with one Oak Leaf Cluster; Air Medal with 25 Oak Leaf Clusters; Air Force Commendation Medal with one Oak Leaf Cluster; Purple Heart; Air Force Outstanding Unit Award Ribbon; Republic of Vietnam Distinguished Service Order, 2d Class; Republic of Vietnam Armed Forces Honor Medal; Republic of Korea Order of Military Merit; Republic of Vietnam Gallantry Cross with palm; Republic of Philippines Legion of Honor; and Republic of Vietnam Campaign Medal. U.S. Air Force Lt. Gen. (Ret.) Leroy J. Manor was presented a medal of knight of the French Legion of Honor March 3, 2015 in St. Petersburg, Fla., for his determination and participation in the air offensive over Europe, including the Liberation of Normandy.

U.S. Air Force Command Pilot Badge
Air Force Distinguished Service Medal with three bronze oak leaf clusters
Legion of Merit with bronze oak leaf cluster	Distinguished Flying Cross with Valor device and bronze oak leaf cluster	Purple Heart
Air Medal with four silver oak leaf clusters	Air Medal with four bronze oak leaf clusters (second ribbon required for accoutrement spacing)	Air Force Commendation Medal with bronze oak leaf cluster
Army Commendation Medal	Air Force Presidential Unit Citation	Air Force Outstanding Unit Award with Valor device and bronze oak leaf cluster
Combat Readiness Medal	American Campaign Medal	European–African–Middle Eastern Campaign Medal with silver and bronze campaign stars
World War II Victory Medal	National Defense Service Medal with service star	Vietnam Service Medal with silver campaign star
Air Force Longevity Service Award with one silver and three bronze oak leaf clusters	Small Arms Expert Marksmanship Ribbon	Legion of Honour (Knight)
Vietnam Air Force Distinguished Service Order (2nd Class)	Vietnam Armed Forces Honor Medal (1st Class)	South Korean Order of Military Merit (Chungmu Medal)
Philippine Legion of Honor	Vietnam Gallantry Cross Unit Citation	Vietnam Campaign Medal
