= USS Pawcatuck =

Oiler of the United States Navy

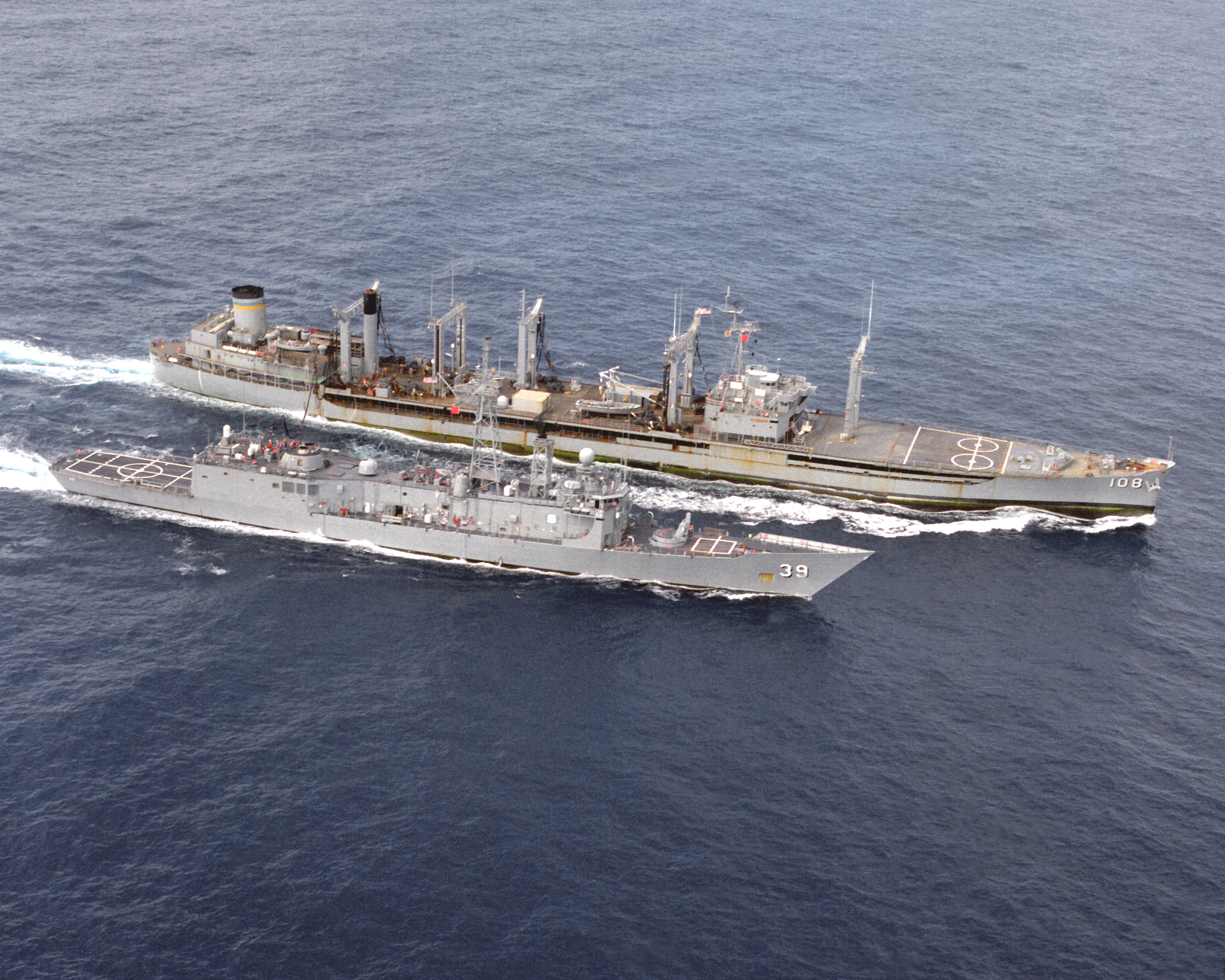
- Pawcatuck refueling USS Doyle (FFG-39) in 1990

History

United States
- Name: USS Pawcatuck
- Namesake: The Pawcatuck River in Connecticut and Rhode Island
- Builder: Sun Shipbuilding and Drydock Company, Chester, Pennsylvania
- Laid down: 22 March 1945
- Launched: 19 February 1946
- Commissioned: 10 May 1946
- Decommissioned: 15 July 1975
- In service: 1975
- Out of service: 1991
- Reclassified: T-AO-108 after 15 July 1975 decommissioning (originally classified AO-108)
- Stricken: 21 September 1991
- Identification: IMO number: 7737157
- Fate: Sold for scrapping 21 September 2005

General characteristics
- Class & type: Ashtabula-class oiler T3–S2–A3 type
- Type: Fleet replenishment oiler
- Displacement: As built: 7,423 tons (light); 25,480 tons (full load); After "jumboization": 12,840 tons (light); 33,987 tons (full load)
- Length: As built: 553 ft (169 m); After "jumboization": 644 ft (196 m)
- Beam: 75 ft (23 m)
- Draft: As built: 32 ft (9.8 m); After "jumboization": 34 ft 9 in (10.59 m)
- Installed power: 30,400 hp (22,700 kW)
- Propulsion: geared turbines, four boilers, twin screws
- Speed: 16 knots (30 km/h)
- Capacity: 146,000 barrels (23,200 m^{3}) of fuel oil
- Complement: 304 (as USS Pawcatuck)
- Crew: 108 civilians plus a U.S. Navy detachment (as USNS Pawcatuck)
- Armament: As built: 1 × 5 in (130 mm) 38-caliber gun; 4 × 3 in (76 mm) 50-caliber guns; 8 × 40-mm antiaircraft guns (4 x 2); 8 × 20-mm antiaircraft guns (4 x 2); After "jumboization": None
- Notes: "Jumboization" involved the lengthening of Pawcatuck's hull and installation of additional cargo capacity during 1965–66.

USS Pawcatuck (AO-108) was a T3 Ashtabula class replenishment oiler tanker that served in the U.S. Navy from 1946 to 1975, then transferred to the Military Sealift Command to continue in non-commissioned service with a civilian crew as United States Naval Ship USNS Pawcatuck (T-AO-108). She was the only United States Navy ship to bear the name Pawcatuck.

== Construction and commissioning ==
USS Pawcatuck (AO–108) was laid down under Maritime Commission contract on 22 March 1945 as Maritime Commission hull 2704 by Sun Shipbuilding and Drydock Company, Chester, Pennsylvania. She was launched on 19 February 1946, sponsored by Miss Nancy Gatch, and commissioned on 10 May 1946.

== Service career ==
=== 1946–65 ===
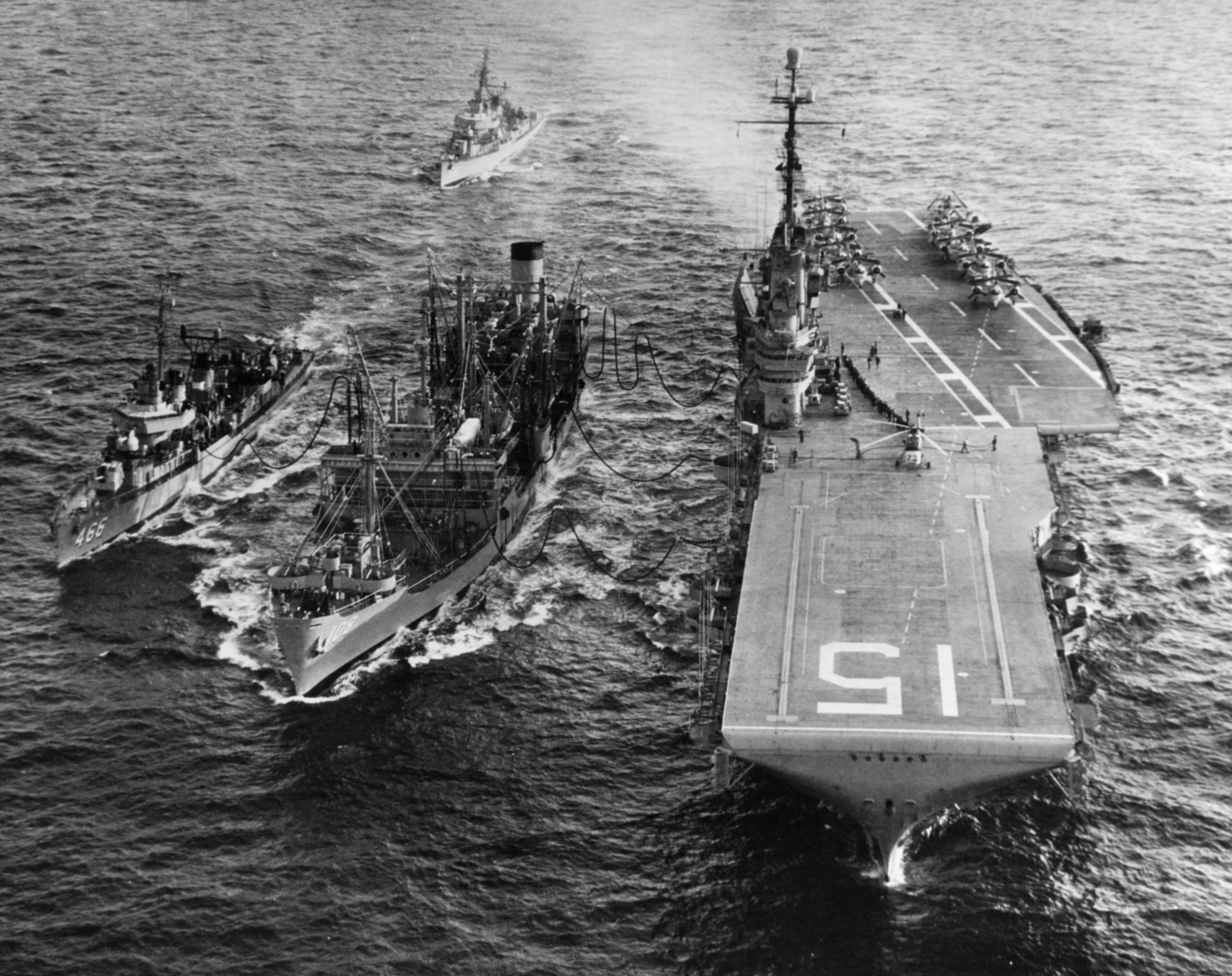
Pawcatuck refueling USS Randolph and USS Waller, 1960

After shakedown, Pawcatuck was assigned the task of transporting petroleum products between various United States Navy facilities and ports on the United States Gulf Coast, in the Caribbean and along the United States East Coast. In the summer of 1947, she joined the United States Sixth Fleet, operating in the Mediterranean Sea for her first overseas tour. From 1948 to 1961, Pawcatuck operated on a rotational schedule between the United States Atlantic Fleet and the Sixth Fleet in the Mediterranean, participating in U.S. and North Atlantic Treaty Organization (NATO) exercises, United States Naval Reserve and United States Naval Academy midshipman cruises, and courtesy visits to foreign ports, and serving as flagship of Commander Service Squadron 2. She supported American forces during the Lebanon Crisis of 1958.

In November 1961, she sailed for her first North Atlantic deployment and operated with Antisubmarine Warfare Carrier Task Group 83.3 until February 1962. In November 1962 she deployed to the Caribbean for support to U.S. Navy units involved in the Cuban Missile Crisis blockade effort. She spent early 1963 in Boston, Massachusetts, for overhaul, but by June 1963 she had returned to the Mediterranean and Sixth Fleet operations.

During 1964 Pawcatuck operated with the Atlantic Fleet performing logistic services and conducting training exercises. In January 1965 she sailed to the Caribbean, where she made port calls and provided support and training services. She returned to Norfolk, Virginia, for most of March and April 1965. In late April 1965 she was ordered south to the vicinity of the Dominican Republic to support U.S. Navy units during the crisis there and the intervention there by the U.S. Marine Corps in Operation Powerpack. On 12 June 1965 she sailed for Northern European waters and, with other units, engaged in joint amphibious exercises with the armed forces of Norway.

=== "Jumboization", 1965–66 ===
Upon returning to the United States on 23 July 1965, she prepared to enter the yards for an extensive "jumboization" conversion, with preliminary work conducted at Boston, Massachusetts. She then steamed up the St. Lawrence River and put into the yards of the American Shipbuilding Company at Lorain, Ohio, on 14 September 1965. Pawcatuck spent the rest of 1965 and all of 1966 undergoing conversion, during which her overall length was increased to 644 feet (196 m), her draft to 35 feet 9 inches (10.90 m), and her displacement to 35,000 tons. She did not lose her four 3 inch x 50 guns. They were removed when she went into civilian service before final decommissioned.

=== 1967–75 ===
After outfitting at Boston, Massachusetts, Pawcatuck sailed on 23 February 1967 to Craney Island, Virginia, where she received her first "jumbo" load of 2,500,000 US gallons (9,500,000 L) of aviation fuel and 5,400,000 US gallons (20,000,000 L) of fuel oil for surface vessels. This operation took five days and she then sailed to her home port at Mayport, Florida, to resume operations as a fleet oiler.

On 29 January 1968, Pawcatuck deployed to the Mediterranean and serviced over 300 ships of the U.S. Sixth Fleet and NATO allies while participating in exercises "Fairgame IV", "Dawn Patrol", and "Flapex" and in many smaller fleet exercises. She returned to Mayport on 6 August 1968 and spent the latter part of the year servicing units of the recovery force for the Apollo 7 space mission.

During January and February 1969, Pawcatuck made preparations for another Mediterranean deployment.

Pawcatuck remained in active, commissioned U.S. Navy service until 1975, but the details of her career between 1969 and 1975 await further research. As of May 1972, Pawcatuck was still home ported in Mayport, FL. Toward the end of 1972 She went on a North Atlantic Cruise going to Holy Loch Scotland, Copenhagen, Rotterdam, Kristiansund Norway, Hamburg Germany and Back to Scotland.

=== Later career and disposition ===
Pawcatuck was decommissioned on 15 July 1975 and transferred to the Military Sealift Command, in which she served in a non-commissioned status with a civilian crew as USNS Pawcatuck (T-AO-108) until 1991.

Pawcatuck was stricken from the Naval Register on 21 September 1991 and was transferred to the United States Maritime Administration as part of the National Defense Reserve Fleet on the James River at Fort Eustis in Newport News, Virginia. She was sold for scrapping to Bay Bridge Enterprises on 21 September 2005. On 19 October 2005, she was removed from the National Defense Reserve Fleet and towed to Chesapeake, Virginia, for scrapping.

== Notes ==
She was awarded the overall fleet efficiency award in 1971 and again in 1972. In 1972 she also won the engineering efficiency award.
