= Teddy Allen =

Teddy Allen may refer to:

- Teddy G. Allen (born 1936), United States Army general
- Teddy Allen (basketball) (born 1998), American basketball player

== See also ==
- Teddie Allen (born 2006), English actress
