= 5th Special Forces Group (United States) =

5th Special Forces Group (Airborne)
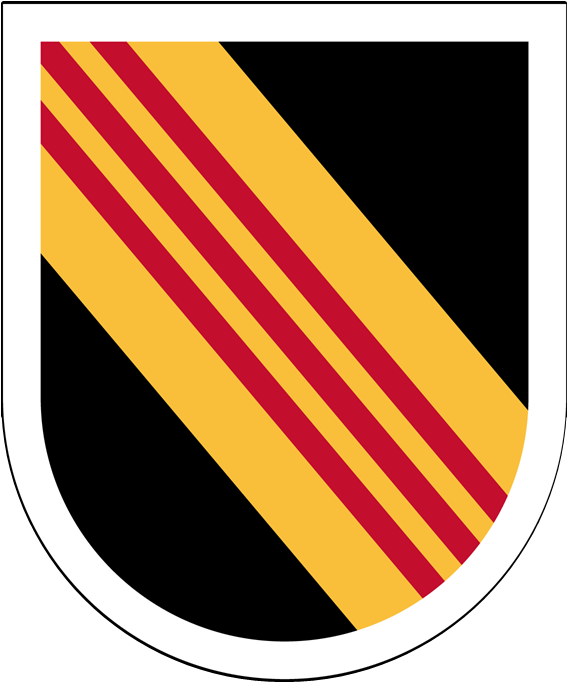
- 5th Special Forces Group beret flash 1964–1985 and 2016–present
- Founded: 21 September 1961
- Country: United States
- Branch: United States Army
- Type: Special operations forces
- Role: Primary tasks: Unconventional Warfare (UW); Foreign Internal Defense (FID); Direct Action (DA); Counter-Insurgency (COIN); Special Reconnaissance (SR); Counter-Terrorism (CT); Information Operations (IO); Counterproliferation of WMD (CP); Security Force Assistance (SFA)
- Size: 4 battalions
- Part of: 1st Special Forces Command
- Garrison/HQ: Fort Campbell, Kentucky, U.S.
- Nicknames: "The Legion" "Legionnaires"
- Mottos: "Strength and Honor" "De Oppresso Liber"
- Engagements: Vietnam War; Persian Gulf War; Somali Civil War; Global War on Terrorism: War in Afghanistan; Iraq War; Operation Inherent Resolve
- Decorations: Valorous Unit Award

Commanders
- Current commander: COL Ken Wainwright, USA

Insignia
- 1st Special Forces Regimental Distinctive Unit Insignia, worn by members of all Special Forces Group and the 1st Special Forces Command

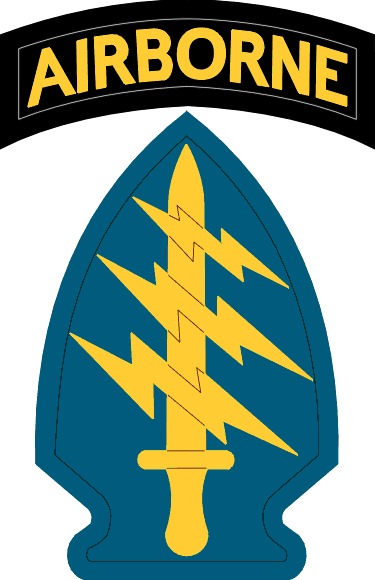
- 1st Special Forces Command (Airborne) Shoulder Sleeve Insignia, worn by all 1st Special Forces Command units

- Former 5th SFG(A) recognition bars, worn by non-special operations qualified soldiers in lieu of a beret flash from the 1960s to 1984

- Former 5th Special Forces Group Beret Flash from 1961–1963 and 1985–2016

The 5th Special Forces Group (Airborne) (5th SFG (A), 5th Group) is one of the most decorated active duty United States Army Special Forces groups. The 5th SFG (A) saw extensive action in the Vietnam War and played a pivotal role in the early months of Operation Enduring Freedom. 5th Group is designed to deploy and execute nine doctrinal missions: unconventional warfare, foreign internal defense, direct action, counter-insurgency, special reconnaissance, counter-terrorism, information operations, counterproliferation of weapon of mass destruction, and security force assistance.

As of 2016, the 5th SFG (A) was primarily responsible for operations within the CENTCOM area of responsibility as part of Special Operations Command, Central (SOCCENT). The group specializes in operations in the Middle East, Persian Gulf, Central Asia, and the Horn of Africa. The 5th SFG (A) and two of its battalions spend roughly six months out of every 12 deployed to Iraq as Combined Joint Special Operations Task Force – Arabian Peninsula.

== History ==
=== Unit lineage ===
The 5th SFG (A) traces its lineage to the 1st Battalion, 3rd Regiment, 1st Special Service Force, a combined Canadian-American organization that was constituted on 5 July 1942 and activated four days later on 9 July at Fort William Henry Harrison, Montana. The 1st Special Service Force disbanded on 5 December 1944 in Villeneuve-Loubet, France.

5th Group was constituted on 15 April 1960, concurrently consolidated with Headquarters and Headquarters Company, 5th Ranger Infantry Battalion (activated 1 September 1943). The consolidated unit was redesignated as Headquarters and Headquarters Company, 5th Special Forces Group, 1st Special Forces. Organic elements were constituted on 8 September 1961. 5th Group was reactivated 21 September 1961 at Fort Bragg, North Carolina.

On 1 October 2005, the unit was redesignated as the 5th Special Forces Group, 1st Special Forces Regiment.

=== Cold War ===
==== Vietnam War ====
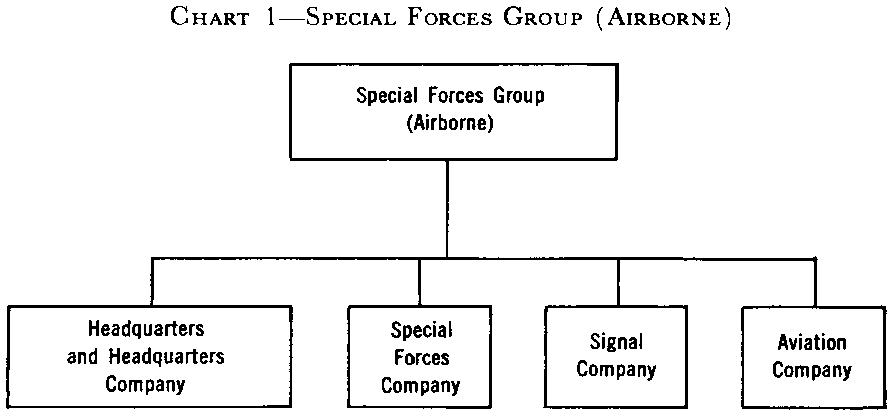
Special Forces Group organization in the Vietnam Era

In 1961, President John F. Kennedy began activating special forces units, including 5th Special Forces Group, to fight the growing Viet Cong insurgency. The 5th SFG was first deployed as a battlefield advisory group for the Army of the Republic of Vietnam (ARVN). In 1964, the Group hired Vietnamese and other Southeast Asian producers to make fatigues, boonie hats, and other items of Tigerstripe fabric. By February 1965, the war was in full swing and the Group was deployed as a mainstay battle force using unconventional and conventional warfare.

From 1961 to 1963, the group wore a black flash bordered in white, designed primarily to provide visibility against the Green Beret. The group's personnel in Vietnam adopted a variant flash, which added diagonal yellow stripe with three narrow red over-stripes to the existing black background and white border. This version was worn from 1963 to 1970. These colors symbolize the 1st and 7th SFG soldiers who served under 5th SFG during the Vietnam War. From 1970 to 1985, the variant flash was adopted by the entire Group, rather than just those serving in Vietnam. The unit's flash reverted to the plain black version on 16 January 1985. On 23 March 2016, the 5th Special Forces Group once more changed over to the Vietnam-era flash.

The 5th Special Forces Group (Airborne) was unique in the Vietnam War for its heavy usage of watercraft, particularly Hurricane Aircat airboats. It launched a wide-ranging campaign against Viet Cong forces in the Mekong Delta in July 1967. Conducted with the South Vietnamese Army, civilian irregulars, and the U.S. Navy and Air Force, the campaign was built around the use of some 400 watercraft, including 84 airboats, as well as helicopters, Navy warships, and civilian vessels. The extensive naval operations required an overhaul in tactics to allow the 5th Special Forces Group to best employ the speed and firepower of the Aircat airboats. When used with armed helicopters, Patrol Air Cushion Vehicle hovercraft, and support from Air Force reconnaissance planes, Navy river patrol boats, and artillery, these watercraft enabled "telling victories over the Viet Cong" and turned the flood season into a tactical advantage for the United States. The use of watercraft, increases in troop strength, and introduction of other tactics—deploying more soldiers to Civilian Irregular Defense Group (CIDG) bases, distributing improved handbooks to commissioned and non-commissioned officers, etc.— allowed the 5th Special Warfare Group to take the fight to the enemy, capturing large swaths of territory in the Delta, making the 50 percent of the territory and CIDG bases that were previously too overrun with Viet Cong to enter safe enough to operate in, and mounting operations and establishing CIDG bases deep in Viet Cong territory. These gains were not without cost, however: 55 Special Forces and 1,654 Vietnamese were killed during 1967, as well as an estimated 7,000 Viet Cong.

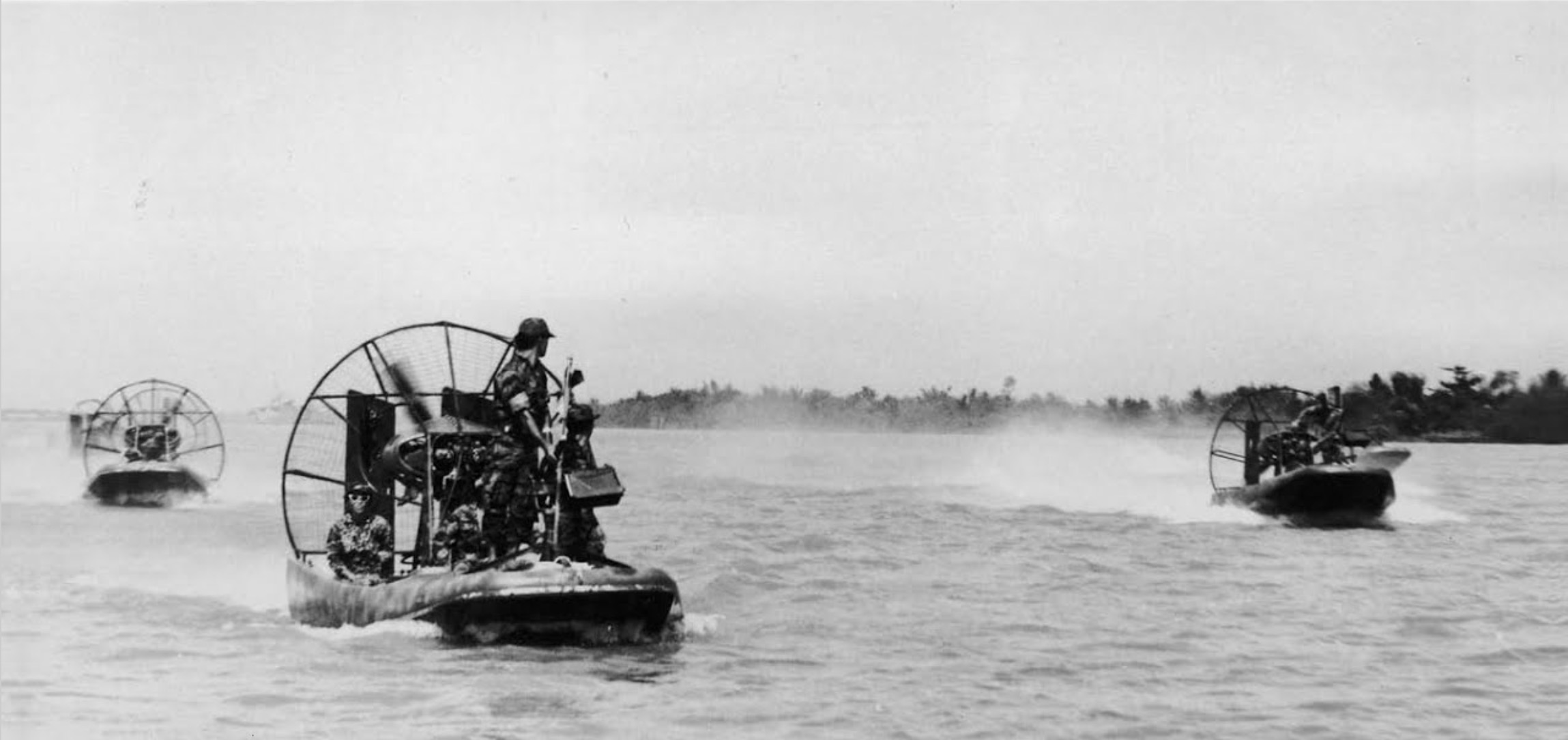
5th Special Forces Company D Hurricane Aircat airboats on the Mekong near the Cambodian border in 1966

The June 1969 killing of suspected double agent Thai Khac Chuyen, and the attempt to cover it up, led to the arrest in July of seven officers and one non-commissioned officer of the 5th Special Forces Group (Airborne) including the new commander, Colonel Robert B. Rheault in what became known as the "Green Beret Affair". Chuyen was working with the 5th on Project GAMMA when the Green Berets learned he might be a double agent. He underwent about ten days of rigorous interrogation and solitary confinement before he was shot and dumped into the sea. National newspapers and television picked up the story, which became another lightning rod for anti-war feeling. Finally, in September 1969, Secretary of the Army Stanley Resor announced that all charges would be dropped since the CIA, which may have had some involvement, refused to make its personnel available as witnesses.

In April 1970, 5th SFG began reducing its number of personnel in Vietnam. Later in November and December, further reductions in personnel and extraction of companies ensued, ending in a complete withdrawal of the group by March. On 5 March 1971, 5th SFG returned to Fort Bragg. The 6th SFG at Fort Bragg was reflagged as the 5th SFG with the transfer of colors. Personnel and equipment were not transferred. Sixteen Soldiers assigned to or administratively assigned to 5th Special Forces Group (Airborne) during the Vietnam War were awarded the Medal of Honor; making 5th Group the most prominently decorated unit for its size in that conflict. Members of the unit continued to conduct intelligence operations in Southeast Asia until the collapse of the South Vietnamese government on 29 April 1975. Soldiers of the 5th were some of the last U.S. troops pulled out of Vietnam.

The Military Assistance Command, Vietnam – Studies and Observations Group (MACV-SOG) was a joint unconventional warfare task force created by the Joint Chiefs of Staff as a subsidiary command of the Military Assistance Command, Vietnam (MACV). The unit would eventually consist primarily of personnel from the United States Army Special Forces. Others assigned to MACV-SOG came from the United States Navy SEALs, the United States Air Force, the Central Intelligence Agency (CIA) Special Activities Division, and elements of the United States Marine Corps Force Reconnaissance units. The Studies and Observations Group was in fact controlled and missioned by the Special Assistant for Counterinsurgency and Special Activities (SACSA) and his staff at the Pentagon. After 1967 the HQ 5th Special Forces Group (Airborne), provided administrative support to MACV-SOG Special Forces soldiers in Vietnam.

The 5th Special Forces Group (Airborne) was headquartered at Fort Bragg until 10 June 1988, when the Group colors were cased at a ceremony marking its departure.

==== Move to Fort Campbell ====
In the mid-1980s, the Army decided to move 5th Group from Fort Bragg. The original destination was Fort Bliss, Texas, because of its ideal training environment. In 1986, the Chief of Staff of the Army decided that the training environment should not be the principal factor in determining where to move the Group. He requested another analysis that considered such factors as total cost, military construction cost, and the impact of unit moves and activations on post populations. After this analysis, he decided to move the Group to Fort Campbell by the end of 1988. The Secretary of the Army approved the plan.

The colors were uncased on 16 June 1988 at the unit's new home at Fort Campbell, Kentucky, by Maj. Gen. Teddy G. Allen, Commander of the 101st Airborne Division (Air Assault) and Fort Campbell, Kentucky; Col. (now MG ret.) Harley C. Davis, Commander of the 5th Special Forces Group (Airborne); and Command Sgt. Maj. Joseph Dennison.

==== Late Cold War ====
In 1989, Operation Salam established United Nations demining training camps for Afghans at Risalpur and Quetta in Pakistan. By 1995, these camps trained 17,055 mine-clearance personnel. Operation Salam also aimed to help Afghan refugees identify mines and undertake due precautions.

5th Group soldiers who participated in this operation received the United Nations Special Service Medal (UNSSM) for service with the United Nations Office for the Co-ordination of Humanitarian Assistance to Afghanistan (UNOCHA).

==== Persian Gulf War ====
===== Operations Desert Shield and Desert Storm =====
The 5th Special Forces Group (Airborne) added to its combat history during operations Desert Shield and Desert Storm. In August 1990 the group was called upon to conduct operations in Southwest Asia in response to the Iraqi invasion of Kuwait. During this crisis, the Army's First Special Operations Task Force consisting of elements of the 5th Special Forces Group (Airborne), comprising 106 special operations teams, performed a wide variety of missions. These spanned a wide scope of operations, including support to coalition warfare; conducting foreign internal defense missions with the Saudi Arabian Army; performing special reconnaissance, border surveillance, direct action, combat search and rescue missions; and advising and assisting a pan-Arab equivalent force larger than six U.S. divisions; as well as conducting civil-military operations training and liaison with the Kuwaitis. The border surveillance mission assigned the 5th Special Forces was key to providing actionable intelligence to the US and Pan-Arab Forces. New military relationships were forged between the U.S. and the Arab states.

General Norman Schwarzkopf described the Special Forces as "the eyes and ears" of the conventional forces and the "glue that held the coalition together."

During the period of 2 August 1990 – 30 November 1995, selected unnamed members were awarded the Southwest Asia Service Medal, Saudi Arabia Kuwait Liberation Medal, Kuwaiti Kuwait Liberation Medal, National Defense Service Medal and the Valorous Unit Award reference General Orders 14.

=== Operations Restore Hope and United Shield ===
On 3 December 1992, U.N. Security Resolution 794 authorized the U.S. led intervention "to use all necessary means to establish a secure environment for humanitarian relief operations in Somalia as soon as possible." Select members of the unit were awarded the Armed Forces Expeditionary Medal and the United Nations Medal.

=== Global war on terrorism ===
==== War in Afghanistan ====
After 11 September attacks, the U.S. government acted quickly. The following day, President Bush called the attacks more than just "acts of terror" but "acts of war" and resolved to pursue and conquer an "enemy" that would no longer be safe in "its harbors". By 13 September 2001, the 5th Special Forces Group was ordered to stand up a forward headquarters to conduct operations in Afghanistan.

The unit received its orders in mid-October. Their mission was wide-open: to assist General Abdul Rashid Dostum in conducting unconventional warfare to make key Taliban-controlled areas unsafe for terrorists and Taliban activities. Task Force Dagger, established on 10 October 2001, was built around the 5th SFG with helicopter support from the 160th SOAR, and assigned to infiltrate northern Afghanistan in order to advise and support the commanders of the Northern Alliance.

The first group of Task Force Dagger included seven members of the CIA's Special Activities Division and Counter Terrorist Center (CTC) led by Gary Schroen, who formed the Northern Afghanistan Liaison Team. The CIA team infiltrated Afghanistan into the Panjshir Valley, north of Kabul, on 26 September, only 15 days after the 11 September attacks. They brought three cardboard boxes filled with $3 million in $100 bills to buy support. Known by the callsign Jawbreaker, the team linked up with Northern Alliance commanders and prepared for the introduction of Army Special Forces into the region.

===== Insertion =====
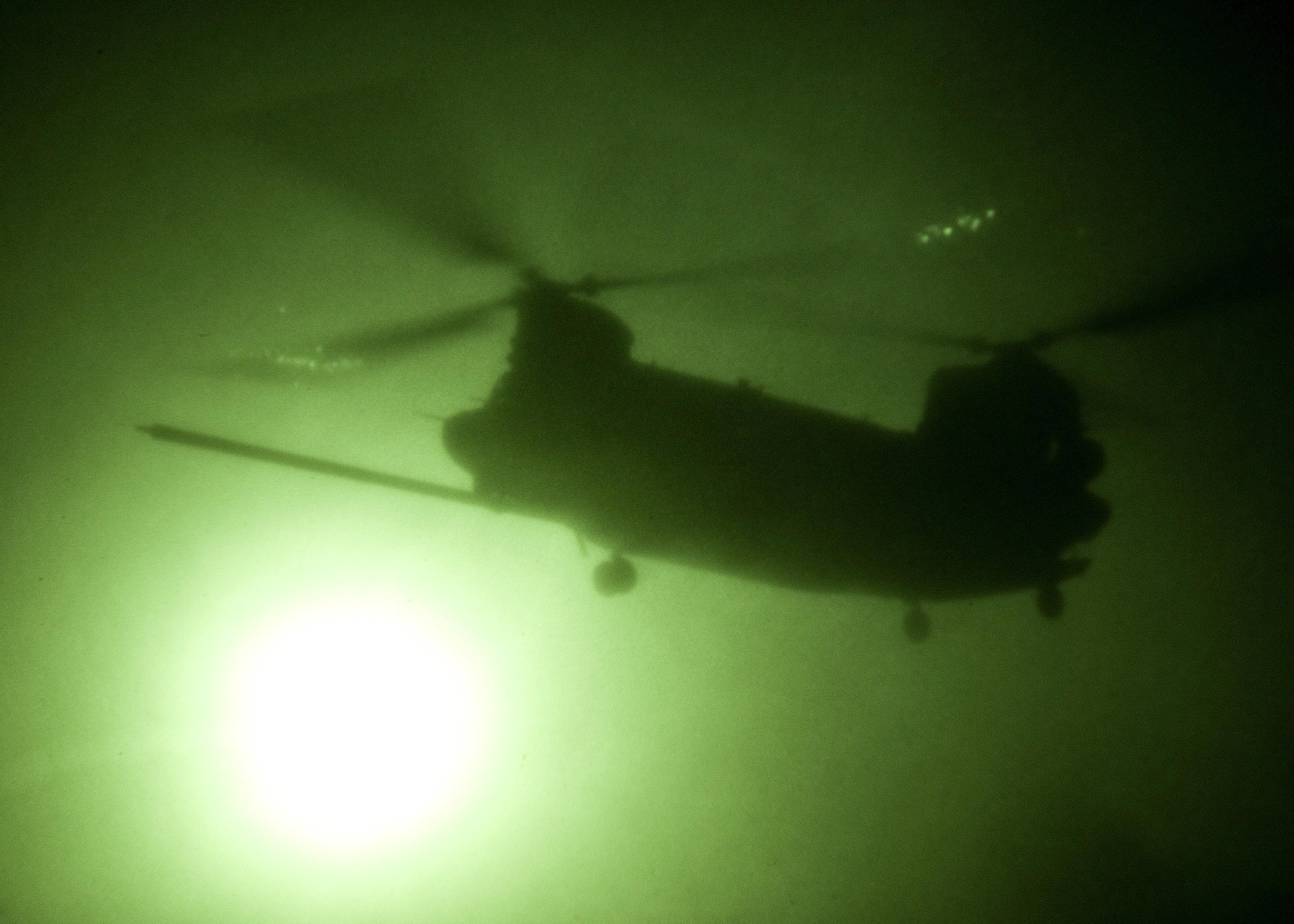
Special Forces Operational Detachment Alpha teams 555 and 595 were inserted into Afghanistan at night in zero-visibility conditions aboard two MH-47 Chinook helicopters.

Operational Detachments Alpha (ODA) 555 and 595, both 12-man teams, plus Air Force combat controllers, were the second and third groups of Task Force Dagger and the first American military personnel to enter Afghanistan. An initial insertion was tried on October 17 but was aborted due to weather conditions. Two days later, on 19 October, the two teams were flown from the former Soviet Karshi-Khanabad Air Base in Uzbekistan more than 300 kilometers (190 mi) across the 4,900 metres (16,100 ft) Hindu Kush mountains. They flew in two 160th Special Operations Aviation Regiment MH-47E Chinook helicopters, escorted by two "DAP" (Direct Action Penetrator) MH-60L Black Hawks. Conditions were marginal due to the altitude and icing in the Hindu Kush.

The Direct Action Penetrators were forced to turn back when they were unable to negotiate a pass. At certain altitudes, the troops had to use single-use "bailout bottles" because of the lack of oxygen. As there were only enough bottles for the outbound flight, the mission was "one way" for the soldiers. Due to the length of the journey, the pilots needed to refuel mid-flight; these refuelings were carried out at low altitude under black out conditions and radio silence. By the end of the flight, the MH-47 crews had set a world record for combat rotorcraft, refueling three times over 11 hours of flight. After refueling, they flew into a sand storm and heavy fog which created near-zero visibility conditions.

ODA 555 was dropped off in the Panjshir River Valley just 20 miles north of Kabul, where they linked up with warlord Fahim Khan and his Northern Alliance forces. The Northern Alliance was in a stalemate with Taliban forces near Bagram Airfield and it was hoped that the ODA would be able to help tip the balance. The second Chinook dropped off ODA 595, led by Capt. Mark D. Nutsch, onto a farmer's field at 0200, in the Dari-a-Souf Valley, about 80 km (50 mi) south of Mazar-i-Sharif. The teams arrived only 39 days after the Al-Qaeda attack on the World Trade Center for what was anticipated to be a year-long mission. The teams were extremely isolated, hundreds of miles from any allied forces. In the event of injuries or retreat, any possible extraction would take hours or days to arrive. On arrival, both teams linked up with the Northern Alliance and 'Jawbreaker' CIA advisers. Several of the CIA team members previously served in U.S. military special operations, but were in the country as civilian operators.

In the southern portion of Afghanistan, a company-sized element of about 200 Rangers from the 3rd Battalion, 75th Ranger Regiment were flown in on four Lockheed MC-130 aircraft and captured a desert landing strip south of the city of Kandahar in Operation Rhino.

===== Fighting on horseback =====
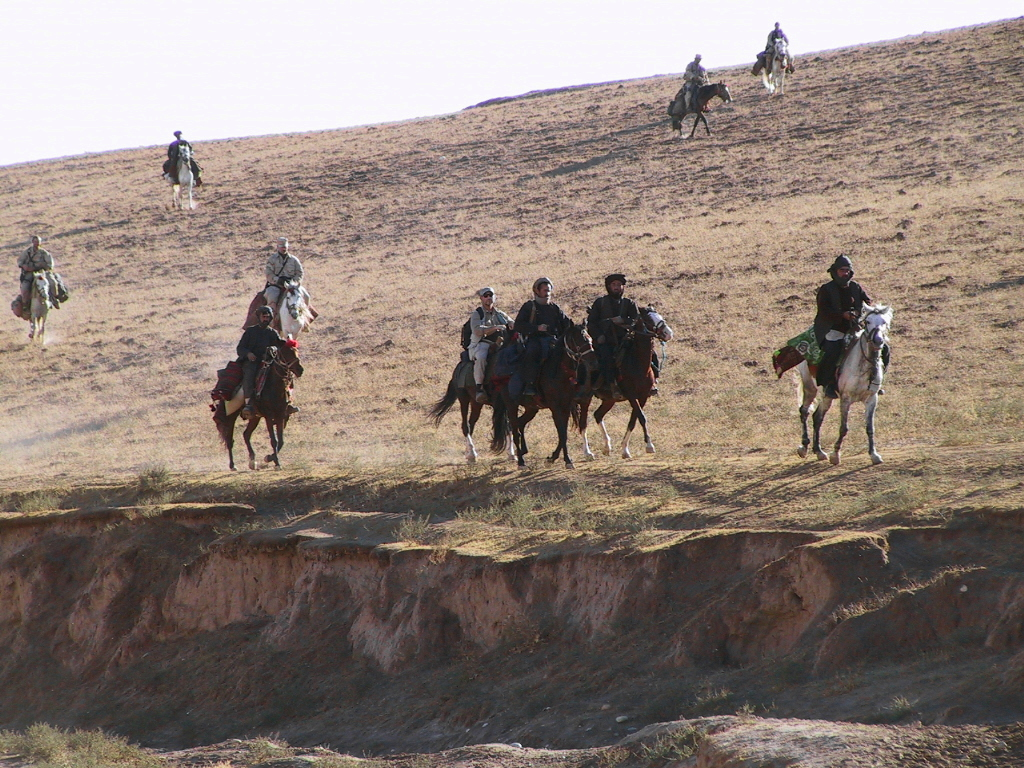
Members of ODA 595, part of Task Force Dagger, and Afghan forces ride into northern Afghanistan in October 2001 on horseback.

Once they arrived in-country, the Northern Alliance troops provided the US forces with horses, the only suitable transportation for the difficult mountainous terrain of Northern Afghanistan. Only ODA 595 commander Capt. Mark D. Nutsch had any significant experience on horseback, but all readily accepted. Capt. Will Summers, Special Forces team leader, said "It was as if The Jetsons had met The Flintstones." The last U.S. Army unit to receive horseback training had been the 28th Cavalry in 1943 and the ODA teams were the first U.S. soldiers to ride horses into battle since 16 January 1942, when the U.S. Army's 26th Cavalry Regiment charged an advanced guard of the 14th Japanese Army as it advanced from Manila. The Afghan horses were all stallions and tended to fight one another which made riding especially difficult for those still learning. They rode trails alongside cliffs which dropped off nearly 1,000 feet (300 m), often at night. During the next few weeks they traveled 10 to 30 kilometres (6.2 to 18.6 mi) per day.

During one especially harrowing ride off of a high mountain pass, zig-zagging down multiple switch-backs, his horse took his own lead and leaped straight down the mountainside. Galloping down the cliffside, Summers was barely able to stay in the saddle.He and his horse made it down the entire way intact. As General Dostum and the others caught up, the General looked at him somewhat strangely, before saying Summers was the "finest horseman he has ever seen". The name stuck and afterward he was known as "The bravest horseman in all of Afghanistan".

Captain Nutsch soon requested replacements for the traditional small, hard, wooden saddles used by the Afghanistan soldiers. He specified a supply of lightweight saddles, either McClellan or Australian-style, suitable for the smaller Afghan horses. A supply of saddles was air-dropped in mid-November. A picture of the soldiers on horseback was shown by Defense Secretary Donald Rumsfeld during a news conference on 15 November 2001. When sculptor Douwe Blumberg saw it, he was struck by the image and later created what became the only public sculpture to commemorate special forces, America's Response Monument.

On 21 October, the Northern Alliance led by General Dostum prepared to attack the fortified village of Bishqab. Dostum's forces were equipped with AK47s, light machine guns, and Rocket Propelled Grenade launchers (RPGs). The Northern Alliance totaled about 1,500 cavalry and 1,500 light infantry. They were assisted by the 12-member U.S. Special Forces team and American airpower. Bishqab was defended by several T-54/55 tanks, a number of BMPs (armored personnel carriers) armed with autocannons and machine guns, and several ZSU-23 anti-aircraft artillery, along with mortars, machine guns, RPGs, and mines. The armor and heavy weapons were usually manned by the foreign Taliban and Al-Qaeda fighters, who fought fiercely and did not surrender readily. To reach the enemy, Dostum's forces needed to cross a 1 mile (1.6 km)-wide open plain cut by seven ridges, each between 50 and 100 feet (15 and 30 m) high, and spaced about 600 feet (180 m) apart, that left the advancing forces completely exposed to enemy fire. To the U.S. Special Forces, it looked like "the Charge of the Light Brigade, Battle of Fredericksburg, and Pickett's Charge at Gettysburg all rolled into one". Supported by American air power and precision-guided munitions, the teams were able to call down accurate fires on the enemy; in one 18-hour battle, they destroyed over 20 armored and 20 support vehicles. Many of the Taliban threw away their weapons and ran, or made a secret pact with Dostum's forces to join his forces as soon as the attack began.

The next day, the Northern Alliance prepared to attack Cobaki. The U.S. Special Ops teams used SOFLAM Laser Target Designators to identify targets for air strikes on the enemy armor and artillery. The Northern Alliance followed this with a horse cavalry charge. When it looked like Dostum's cavalry charge would fail, several members of ODA 595 rode into action and helped win the battle. Within the first two weeks, ODA 595 was joined by two more special forces soldiers, bringing their number to 14. They split the team into four three-man teams and spread out over 60 kilometres (37 mi) of mountainous terrain, in some cases 12 to 18 hours apart from each other by horseback. Each team of NCOs advised senior Northern Alliance commanders and called in airstrikes and resupply for their forces.

On 2 November, a third Special Forces team, ODA 534, was inserted by SOAR to assist Northern Alliance General Atta Mohammad. ODA 534 later linked up with the CIA team Jawbreaker, ODA 595 and 555, and General Dostum outside Mazar-i-Sharif.

===== Capture of Mazar-i-Sharif =====
One of the Task Force Dagger's primary strategic objectives was to capture Mazar-i-Sharif and an airfield so the U.S. could use it to bring in supplies and more troops. On about 6 November, the Northern Alliance broke through the Taliban defense in the valley of Darah Sof District, 200 kilometres (120 mi) from Mazar-i-Sharif. The three teams reunited near Mazar-i-Sharif and participated in its capture. They guided hundreds of GPS-guided 2,000-pound JDAM precision-guided munitions dropped by USAF B-1B Lancer and B-52 Stratofortress heavy bombers onto Taliban and Al-Qaeda positions near Mazar-i-Sharif.

===== Additional teams =====
By 18 November 2001, 10 ODAs from 5th Special Forces Group were operating in Afghanistan.

ODA 534 from Charlie Company, 1st Btn, 5th SFG was split between the Darya and Balkh Valleys supporting General Atta Mohammad.

ODA 553 from Bravo Company, 2nd Btn, 5th SFG was inserted on 2 November. The ten-man team in Bamyan supported General Karim Khalili and his militia in the northern regions of Afghanistan. Together the men worked to flush Taliban forces from the region with a number of cities quickly falling to Kahili's tribal forces.

ODA 554 from Bravo Company, 2nd Btn, 5th SFG was in Herat supporting General Ismail Khan.

ODA 555 ("Triple Nickel") from Bravo Company, 2nd Btn, 5th SFG was, with ODA 595, one of two ODAs inserted on 19 October. They supported General Shariff in the Panjshir Valley, and linked up with General Fahim Akhtar Khan in the Bagram/Kabul area of the Panjshir Valley, near the fortifications surrounding Bagram Air Base. Air Force Combat Controller Sgt. Calvin Markham used a AN/PEQ-1 SOFLAM laser target designator to identify targets for airstrikes on the enemy armor and artillery. He set up a series of strikes on the fields of targets around the airbase, guiding wave after wave of precision-guided munitions onto tanks, armored personnel carriers, guns, and fortifications around Bagram. ODA 555 worked closely with Northern Alliance forces under warlord Fahim Khan. They called in airstrikes that dropped 15,000-lb BLU-82 'Daisy Cutter' bombs on Taliban troop positions with devastating effect along the Shomali Plain. ODA 555 accompanied Khan's militia and fought alongside them in numerous engagements. They sometimes called in airstrikes danger close to stop Taliban attacks. They were with the Northern Alliance militia when they captured Mazar-i-Sharif on 9 and 10 November, and with the assistance of ODA 595 and Jawbreaker, accompanied the militia when they captured Kabul on 13 and 14 November.

ODA 574 ("Texas One-Two") from Alpha Company, 3rd Btn, 5th SFG, commanded by Captain Jason Amerine, deployed from K2 just outside of Tarin Kowt on 14 November, along with Pashtun militia leader, Hamid Karzai. As Karzai's forces pushed south towards Kandahar, an error by an attached USAF TACP resulted in a 2,000-lb GPS-guided JDAM hitting the ODA's position, killing and wounding several Special Forces and Afghan militiamen. Assisted by the remaining ODA 586 soldiers, with reinforcements from ODA 750 and ODA 524, Karzai was able to negotiate the surrender of Taliban forces around Kandahar and go on to become the first Afghan president. For their bravery, ODA 574 was awarded three Silver Stars, four Bronze Star Medals with "V" device for valor, three Bronze Star Medals, and eleven Purple Hearts. Amerine himself was awarded a Bronze Star and a Purple Heart.

ODA 583 from Bravo Company, 3rd Btn, 5th SFG deployed late on 21 November to the Shin Narai Valley supporting Gul Agha Sherzai near the Shin Narai Valley. During their infiltration, one of the helicopters experienced a mechanical failure and made an emergency landing. Another helicopter was dispatched but dropped the team in the wrong location. The 583 finally joined the CIA team and Sherzai and pushed towards Kandahar. The 583 set up observation posts overlooking Kandahar International Airport and over the next few days, called in ongoing air strikes on the Taliban positions. On 7 December, ODA 583 helped Sherzai's forces capture the airport and very soon the city of Kandahar.

ODA 585 from Bravo Company, 3rd Btn, 5th SFG inserted by helo on 23 October into Kunduz to support General Burilla Kahn. Despite initial missed air strikes that left Burillah unimpressed, 585's senior enlisted member Master Sergeant Bolduc called in another wave of F/A-18 Hornet strikes that in four passes obliterated several Taliban command bunkers and collapsed several sections of the enemy's trench lines. The display of coordinated airpower by 585 earned General Burillah's respect and proved their value to the Afghans. ODA 586 eventually joined 585 and General Burillah's men for the final assault on the provincial city of Konduz, seizing it on 11 November.

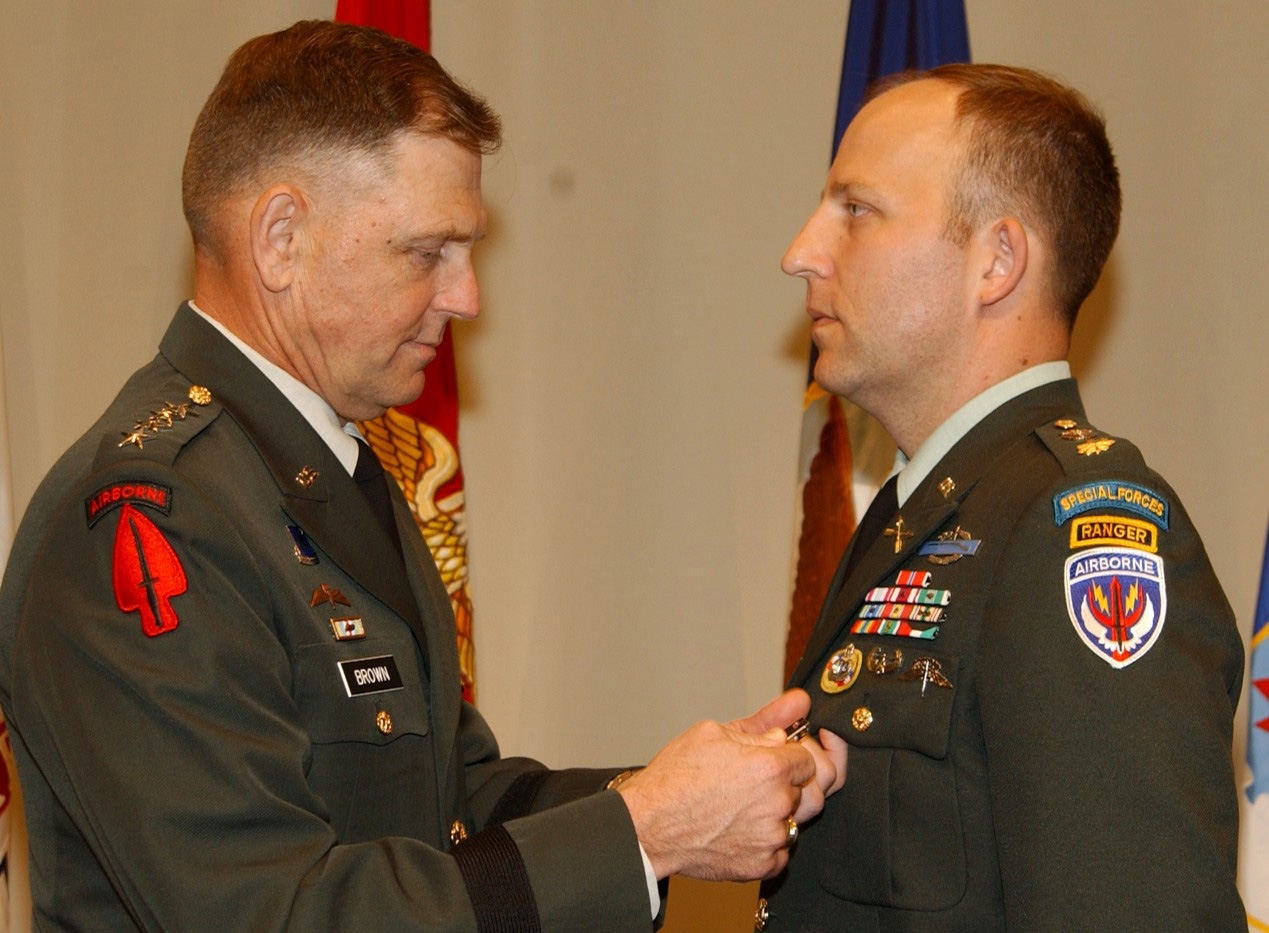
Major Mark E. Mitchell is decorated for his combat actions during the battle by General Bryan D. Brown, chief of the U.S. Special Operations Command

ODA 586 from Bravo Company, 3rd Btn, 5th SFG was in Farkhar supporting General Daud Khan in the Takhar province, who took the capital city of Taloqan on 11 November. Khan's troops, supported by airstrikes called in by ODAs 585 and 586, eventually took the city and provincial capital of Konduz on 26 November.

ODA 595 from Charlie Company, 3rd Btn, 5th SFG was, along with ODA 555, one of two ODAs inserted on 19 October. They helped General Dostum outside Mazar-i-Sharif. ODA 595 were instrumental in helping the Northern Alliance to capture several thousand foreign and Afghan Taliban and bringing hundreds more local Afghans over to the Northern Alliance side. Over two months they destroyed several hundred enemy vehicles, liberated about 50 towns and six northern provinces comprising hundred square kilometers.

===== Mission success =====
The well-placed ordnance dropped on the Taliban by the airpower controlled by Task Force Dagger forced the Taliban and Al-Qaeda forces to continually pull back. The rapidity with which the enemy resistance crumbled eliminated the U.S. military's plans to deploy significant conventional ground forces.

The Taliban and Al Qaeda forces were defeated within two months. It could have happened more quickly, but the Bush administration was fearful that without a provisional government to take over Kabul, the Northern Alliance would commit atrocities as they had when they had previously occupied the capital.

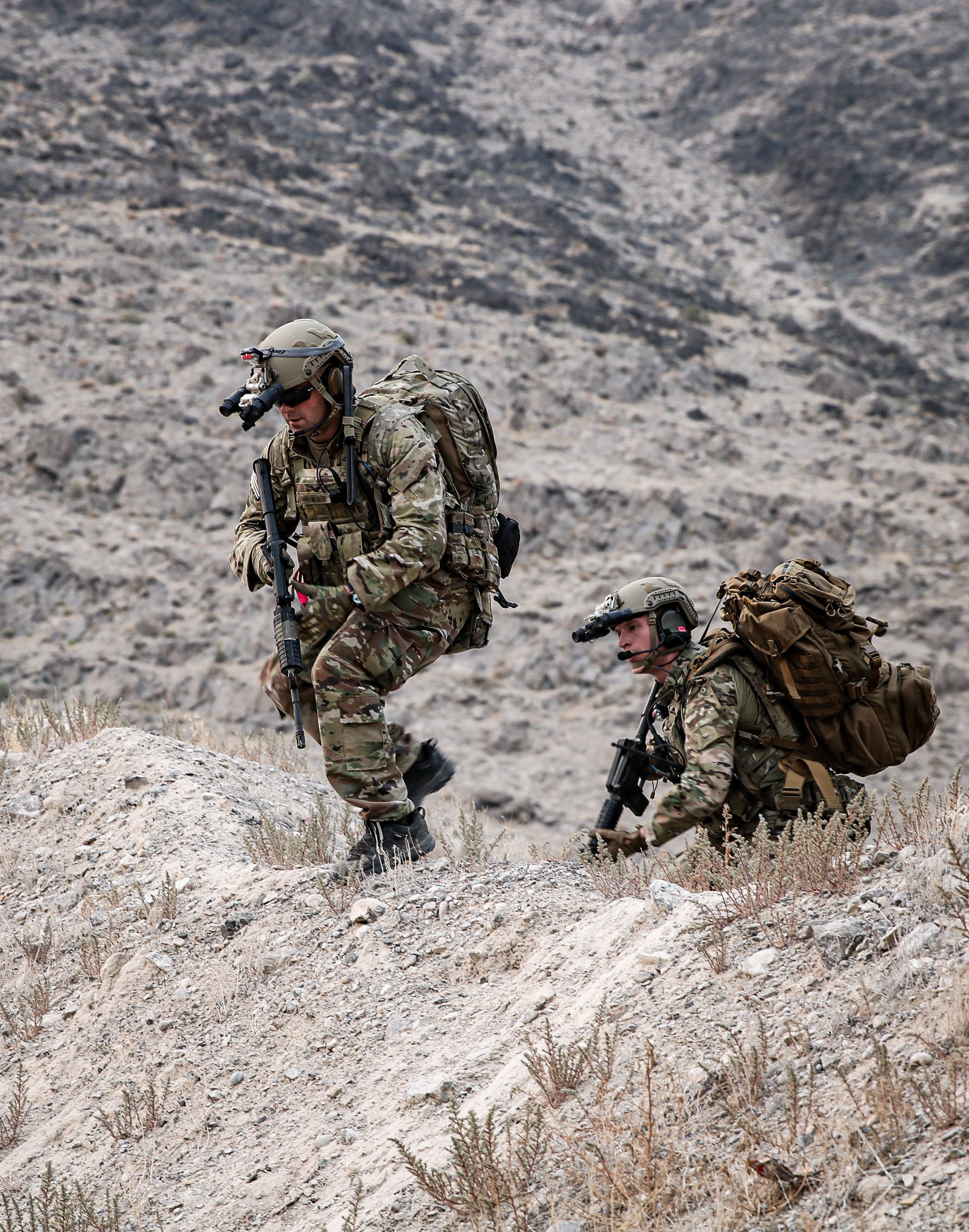
Soldiers from the 56th Chemical Reconnaissance Detachment (CRD), 4th Battalion, 5th Special Forces conduct SSE training

The ground forces who eventually entered Afghanistan were left to pursue high-value targets, including Osama bin Laden, among the Al-Qaeda near the Pakistani border. The high-level command of Task Force Dagger remained in the country until the unit was finally redeployed to the United States in April 2002.

Major Mark E. Mitchell of the 5th Special Forces Group (Airborne) was awarded the Distinguished Service Cross for gallantry in November 2001 at Qala-i-Jangi Fortress, Mazar-i-Sharif, Afghanistan.

=== Iraq War ===
==== Operations Iraqi Freedom and New Dawn ====
During Operation Iraqi Freedom 5th SFG(A) assisted in the capture of Saddam Hussein and was deployed throughout Iraq as part of Combined Joint Special Operations Task Force – Arabian Peninsula (CJSOTF-AP). 5th Group teamed up with various National Guard support groups from many different states: Virginia, Texas, Louisiana, New York, Minnesota, Wisconsin and others.

== Subordinate units ==
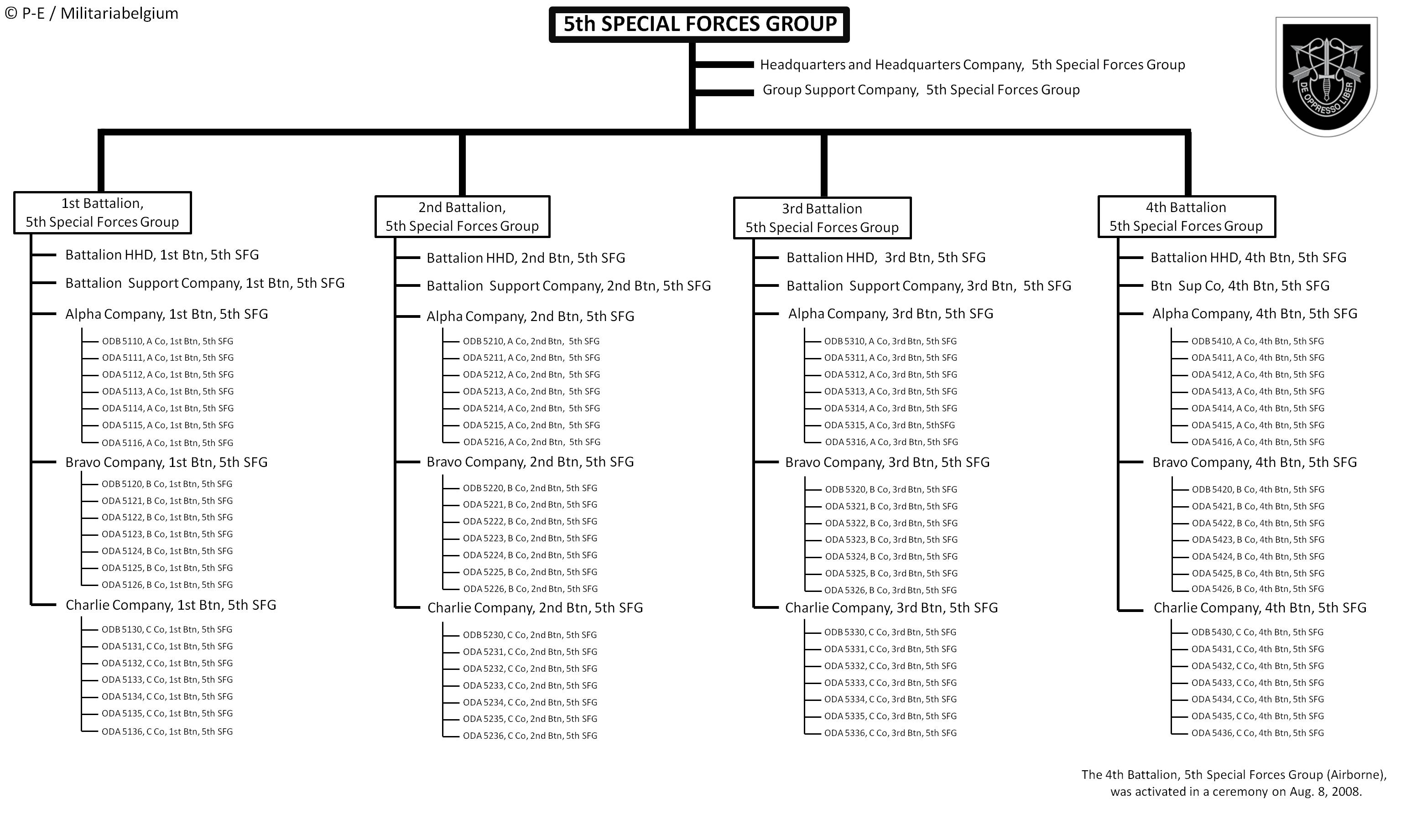
Current structure of the 5th SFG (A)

== Unit campaign credit ==
=== World War II ===
- Aleutian Islands
- Naples-Foggia
- Anzio
- Rome-Arno
- Southern France (with arrowhead)
- Rhineland

=== Vietnam ===
- Advisory
- Defense
- Counteroffensive
- Counteroffensive, Phase II
- Counteroffensive, Phase III
- Tet Counteroffensive
- Counteroffensive, Phase IV
- Counteroffensive, Phase V
- Counteroffensive, Phase VI
- Tet 69/Counteroffensive
- Summer–Fall 1969
- Winter–Spring 1970
- Sanctuary Counteroffensive
- Counteroffensive, Phase VII

=== Southwest Asia ===
- Defense of Saudi Arabia
- Liberation and Defense of Kuwait
- Cease-Fire

=== Iraq and Afghanistan ===
- Operation Iraqi Freedom
- Operation Enduring Freedom

== Decorations ==
=== Vietnam War honors ===
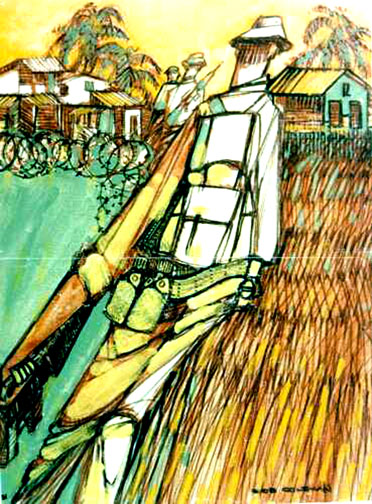
5th Special Forces Patrol by Robert T. Coleman, U.S. Army Vietnam Combat Artists TeamVI (CAT VI 1968).

During ten years of service in the Vietnam War, eighteen Special Forces soldiers were awarded the Medal of Honor, the nation's highest award for conspicuous gallantry and exceptional heroism under fire. The eighteen Special Forces soldiers who received the Medal of Honor in Vietnam represent ten percent of the 179 total U.S. Army recipients of the Medal of Honor during the war.

- Captain (Later Colonel) Paris Davis
- Sergeant First Class (later CSM) Bennie Adkins
- Sergeant First Class Eugene Ashley, Jr.†
- Sergeant Gary B. Beikirch
- Master Sergeant Roy P. Benavidez, CCC, also a member of MAC-V SOG
- Sergeant First Class William M. Bryant†
- Sergeant Brian L. Buker†
- Lieutenant (Later Colonel) Roger H.C.Donlon Company C, 7th SFG, Detachment A726 (Nam Dong)
- Staff Sergeant Drew D. Dix
- Major John J. Duffy
- Master Sergeant Charles E. Hosking, Jr.†
- Sergeant First Class (later Colonel) Robert L. Howard, also a member of MAC-V SOG
- Specialist Five John J. Kedenburg†, also a member of MAC-V SOG
- Staff Sergeant (later Sergeant Major) Franklin D. Miller, also a member of MAC-V SOG
- Staff Sergeant (Later Sergeant First Class) Melvin Morris
- Sergeant First Class Jose Rodela
- First Lieutenant George K. Sisler†, member of MAC-V SOG
- Second Lieutenant (later Major) Charles Q. Williams
- Sergeant Gordon Yntema†
- Sergeant First Class Fred W. Zabitosky, member of MAC-V SOG

† Awarded posthumously

In total, members of the Special Forces earned the following number of awards:

- Distinguished Service Cross 60
- Distinguished Service Medal 1
- Silver Star 815
- Legion of Merit 235
- Distinguished Flying Cross 46
- Soldier's Medal 232
- Bronze Star with V Device 3,074
- Bronze Star 10,160
- Purple Heart 2,658
- Air Medal with V Device 394
- Air Medal 4,527
- Army Commendation Medal with V Device 1,258
- Army Commendation Medal 5,650
- Navy Commendation Medal with V Device 2*

* 5th Special Forces Group (Airborne) Mike Team B55 conducted seek and destroy missions during January – February 1969 in the Rung Sat Special Zone (RSSZ), an area about 20 miles south-southeast of Saigon and under operational command of the US and Vietnamese Navies.

=== Unit honors ===
The 5th Special Forces Group (Airborne), 1st Special Forces, earned the following unit awards in the Vietnam War:

- Presidential Unit Citation 5th Special Forces Group (Airborne), Vietnam, 1 November 1966 – 31 January 1968
- Meritorious Unit Commendation 5th Special Forces Group (Airborne), Vietnam, 31 January – 31 December 1968
- Vietnam Cross of Gallantry with Palm Detachment B-52, Project Delta, 15 May 1964 – 16 August 1968; Detachment A-322 (Soui Da), 18–25 August 1968; and 5th Special Forces Group (Airborne), 1 October 1964 – 17 May 1969
- Valorous Unit Award Detachment B-52, Project Delta, 4 March – 4 April 1968
- Vietnam Civic Action Medal 5th Special Forces Group, (Airborne), 1 January 1968 – 24 September 1970
- Navy Unit Commendation Detachment B-52, Project Delta, 17 April – 17 June 1967 and 15 July – 17 August 1967
- Presidential Unit Citation, Navy Detachment A-101 (Lang Vei), Forward Operations Base 3 (Khe Sanh), and Command and Control (Da Nang), 20 January – 1 April 1968
- Presidential Unit Citation, Studies and Observations Group MACV-SOG (Covert multi service unit controlled by the Joint Chief of Staff) awarded April 2001, Command and Control North (CCN), South (CCS) and Central (CCC), Vietnam War

United States Army Special Forces campaign participation credits number fourteen (see Campaign Participation Credit below) for the Vietnam War and range from 15 March 1962 to 31 December 1970.

1st Battalion additionally entitled to:

- Army Superior Unit Award for 1992–1993

2d Battalion additionally entitled to:

- Army Superior Unit Award for 1992–1993

3d Battalion additionally entitled to:

- Army Superior Unit Award for 1992–1993

=== Southwest Asia ===
Selected members of the unit are eligible to wear the Armed Forces Expeditionary Medal for participating in the following activities between December 95 – 18 March 2003 in SW Asia:

- Operation Southern Watch
- Maritime Intercept Operation
- Operation Vigilant Sentinel
- Operation Northern Watch
- Operation Desert Thunder
- Operation Desert Fox
- Exercise Intrinsic Action
- Exercise Iris Gold
- Operation Desert Spring

== List of commanders ==
- Col. Leo H. Schweiter September 1961 – July 1962 (retired as major general)
- Col. L. E. Wills July 1962 – July 1963
- Col. George Clyde Morton September 1962 – November 1963
- Col. T. Leonard November 1963 – July 1964
- Col. H. F. Roye July 1964 – August 1964
- Col. John H. Spears August 1964 – July 1965
- Col. William A. McKean July 1965 – June 1966
- Col. Francis J. Kelly June 1966 – June 1967
- Col. Jonathan F. Ladd June 1967 – June 1968
- Col. Harold R. Aaron June 1968 – May 1969 (retired as lieutenant general)
- Lt. Col. C. G. Ross (Acting) May 1969
- Col. Robert B. Rheault May 1969 – July 1969
- Col. A. Lemberes July 1969 – August 1969
- Col. Michael D. Healy August 1969 – March 1971 (retired as major general)
- Col. March 1971 – June 1972
- Col. E. L. Keesling June 1972 – December 1973
- Col. A. C. Harris December 1973 – August 1974
- Col. R. Maladowitz August 1974 – February 1976
- Col. C. L. Stearns February 1976 – June 1977
- Col. R. A. Mountel June 1977 – December 1978
- Col. G. W. McGovern December 1978 – December 1980
- Col. H. E. Bynam June 1980 – December 1982
- Col. J. A. Guest December 1982 – June 1985 (retired as major general)
- Col. L. W. Duggan June 1985 – June 1987
- Col. H. C. Davis June 1987 – November 1989 (retired as major general)
- Col. J. W. Kraus November 1989 – August 1991
- Col. Kenneth R. Bowra August 1991 – August 1993 (retired as major general)
- Col. John W. Noe August 1993 – August 1995
- Col. T. M. Carlin August 1995 – August 1997
- Col. D. P. Brownlee August 1997 – July 1999
- Col. C. W. Paxton July 1999 – July 2001
- Col. John F. Mulholland, Jr. July 2001 – July 2003 (retired as lieutenant general)
- Col. H. E. Pagan July 2003 – July 2005 (retired as brigadier general)
- Col. K. McDonnell July 2005 – July 2007
- Col. C. E. Conner July 2007 – August 2009
- Col. M. E. Mitchell August 2009 – August 2011 (retired as colonel)
- Col. S. E. Brower August 2011 – July 2013 (retired as brigadier general)
- Col. John W. Brennan July 2013 – July 2015 (active major general)
- Col. Kevin C. Leahy July 2015 – July 2017 (active duty brigadier general as of 2020)
- Col. L. J. Powers July 2017 – July 2019
- Col. Joseph W. Wortham July 2019 – July 2021
- Col. Brent Lindeman July 2021 – July 2023
- Col. Gabriel A. Szody July 2023 - July 2025
- Col. Kenneth W. Wainright July 2025 - Current

== See also ==
- 12 Strong, a 2018 film depicting the actions of Operational Detachment Alpha (ODA) 595 in fighting the Taliban on horseback are featured.
- The A-Team
- Blue Light, a counter terrorism unit formed by the 5th SFG until Delta Force was fully operational.
- Lauri Törni, aka Major Larry Thorne, a 5th SFG soldier who was killed on a 1965 covert MACV-SOG mission.
