= Clarence Sasser =

American soldier (1947–2024)

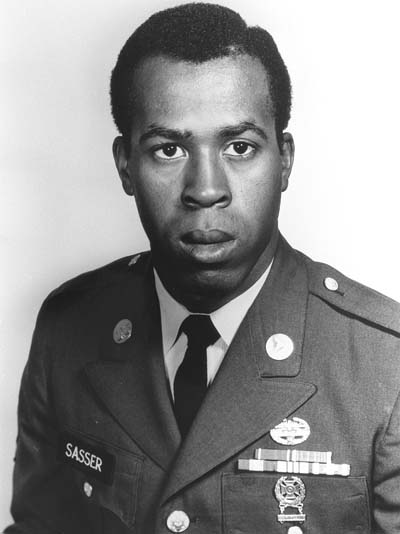
- Born: September 2, 1947; Chenango, Texas, U.S.
- Died: May 13, 2024 (aged 76); Sugar Land, Texas, U.S.
- Military career
- Allegiance: United States
- Branch: United States Army
- Service years: 1967 – 1969
- Rank: Specialist Five
- Unit: 60th Infantry Regiment
- Conflicts: Vietnam War
- Awards: Medal of Honor; Purple Heart

Clarence Eugene Sasser (September 2, 1947 – May 13, 2024) was a United States Army soldier and a recipient of the United States military's highest decoration for valor, the Medal of Honor, for his actions in the Vietnam War.

== Early life and Vietnam War ==
Born in Chenango, Texas, Sasser briefly attended the University of Houston as a chemistry major, but was forced to drop out due to lack of funds. He was drafted into the United States Army after giving up his college deferment and served as a combat medic during the Vietnam War. Sasser's Vietnam War tour lasted just 51 days. He received the Medal of Honor from President Richard Nixon in 1969 for his actions as a combat field medic on January 10, 1968, in Dinh Tuong Province, South Vietnam.

Sasser received multiple wounds during the January 10 battle when his unit was airlifted to a Mekong River rice paddy on a reconnaissance mission. As soon as he disembarked from the transport helicopter, Sasser was shot in the leg. Subsequently, he received shell fragments throughout his body, impeding his ability to render aid to wounded soldiers. Despite his wounds, Sasser continued to crawl through the muddy field, bandaging soldiers and dragging them back to safety. Sasser and other members of his unit continued to fight the enemy for nearly twenty hours and were not evacuated until the next day.

Sasser was transported to a hospital in Japan where he recovered from his injuries. He did not return to Vietnam.

A member of Headquarters and Headquarters Company, 3rd Battalion, 60th Infantry Regiment, 9th Infantry Division, Sasser was a private first class attached to the 3rd Battalion's Company A when he earned the medal and was later promoted to specialist five. He was discharged from the Army in June 1969.

== Civilian life ==
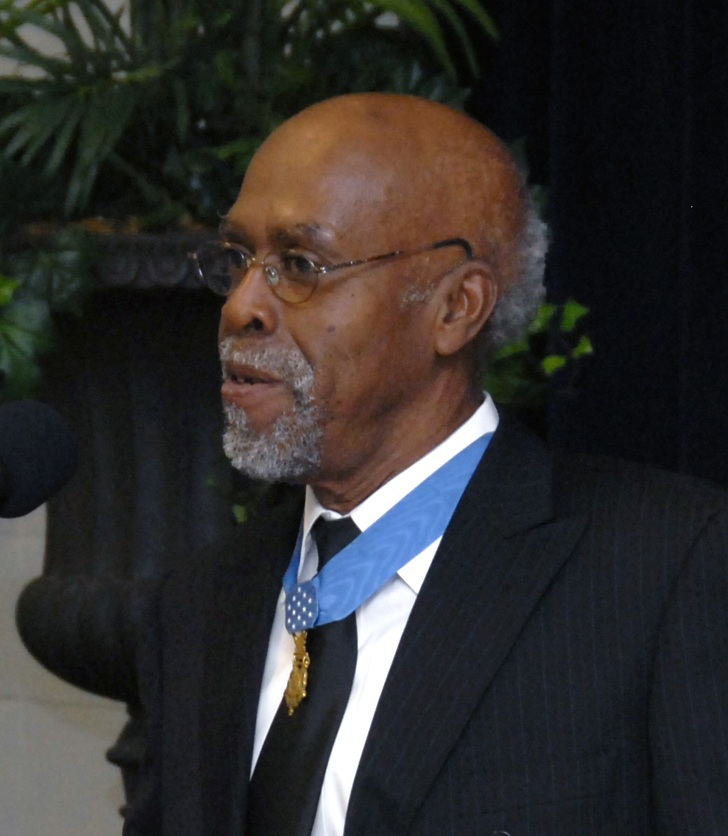
Sasser in 2010

When his military commitment was finished, Sasser enrolled at Texas A&M University as a chemistry student. Although he did not graduate, he received an honorary doctorate of letters from the university in 2014. He then worked at an oil refinery for more than five years before being employed by the United States Department of Veterans Affairs.

In 1970, Sasser married Ethel Morant. The couple had three sons: Ross, Benjamin and Billy. In 1996, his wife died. His sons Ross and Benjamin also preceded Sasser in death.

Sasser raised an American flag on a flagpole outside his home every day. In his later years, he turned down multiple speaking engagements, saying "These are the memories you deal with better if they're not in the forefront of your mind." During a Library of Congress interview, Sasser spoke of the privilege of being a medic and how that helped explain his battlefield bravery: "There's no way I could have, in my mind, not went to see about someone when the hollered medic. Repayment of the adulation these guys heaped on you demanded that you go."

Mr. Sasser provided a four year, $100,000 scholarship for one veteran medical student each year.

A statue depicting Sasser in the war was created in 2010 and was placed in front of the Brazoria County Courthouse.

== Death ==
Sasser died in Sugar Land, Texas, on May 13, 2024, at the age of 76. He was interred at Houston National Cemetery on May 23, 2024.

At the time of his death, Sasser was one of 61 living Medal of Honor recipients and one of just three living Black recipients.

== Medal of Honor ==
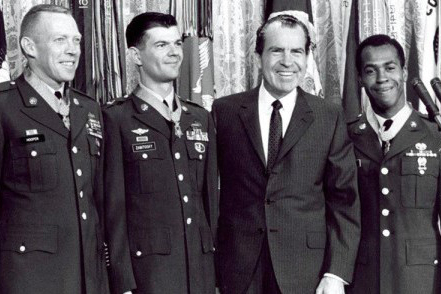
SP5 Clarence Sasser (extreme right) receiving his Medal of Honor from President Nixon.

Sasser was awarded the Medal of Honor by President Richard M. Nixon in a joint ceremony along with two other Medal of Honor recipients: Joe Hooper and Fred Zabitosky.

Official citation:

For conspicuous gallantry and intrepidity in action at the risk of his life above and beyond the call of duty. Specialist 5th Class Sasser distinguished himself while assigned to Headquarters and Headquarters Company, 3d Battalion. He was serving as a medical aidman with Company A, 3rd Battalion, on a reconnaissance in force operation. His company was making an air assault when suddenly it was taken under heavy small arms, recoilless rifle, machinegun and rocket fire from well fortified enemy positions on three sides of the landing zone. During the first few minutes, over 30 casualties were sustained. Without hesitation, Specialist 5th Class Sasser ran across an open rice paddy through a hail of fire to assist the wounded. After helping one man to safety, he was painfully wounded in the left shoulder by fragments of an exploding rocket. Refusing medical attention, he ran through a barrage of rocket and automatic weapons fire to aid casualties of the initial attack and, after giving them urgently needed treatment, continued to search for other wounded. Despite two additional wounds immobilizing his legs, he dragged himself through the mud toward another soldier 100 meters away. Although in agonizing pain and faint from loss of blood, Specialist 5th Class Sasser reached the man, treated him, and proceeded on to encourage another group of soldiers to crawl 200 meters to relative safety. There he attended their wounds for five hours until they were evacuated. Specialist 5th Class Sasser's extraordinary heroism is in keeping with the highest traditions of the military service and reflects great credit upon himself, his unit, and the U.S. Army.

== See also ==
- List of Medal of Honor recipients for the Vietnam War
- List of African-American Medal of Honor recipients
