= Michael D. Healy =

United States Army general (1926–2018)

- Born: June 13, 1926; Chicago, Illinois, United States
- Died: April 14, 2018 (aged 91); Jacksonville, Florida, United States
- Military career
- Allegiance: United States of America
- Branch: United States Army
- Service years: 1945–1981
- Rank: Major General
- Commands: Commander, 4th Airborne Ranger Company; Chief, Special Warfare Operations and Foreign Intelligence Branch; Colonel Senior Adviser, Vietnamese Special Forces; Commander, 1st Battalion (Airborne) 501st Infantry; Commander, Special Troops; Commander, 5th Special Forces Group; Brigadier General; Commander, 82nd Airborne Division; Commanding General, 2nd Regional Assistance Command, Military Region Two "Commander, John F. Kennedy Institute for Special Warfare"; Chief of Staff, Combined Military Planning; Commander, Army Readiness Region V
- Conflicts: World War II; Korean War; Operation Tomahawk; Operation Courageous; Vietnam War
- Awards: Distinguished Service Medal(3); Silver Star (2); Legion of Merit (3); Distinguished Flying Cross; Bronze Star Medal (V)(6); Air Medal (V)(4); Purple Heart (2); Army Commendation Medal (2); Navy Commendation Medal (V); Master Parachutist Badge; Parachutist Badges of: Cambodia, Iran, Korea, Pakistan, Thailand, Republic of Vietnam

Michael Daniel Healy (June 13, 1926 – April 14, 2018) was a major general in the United States Army who spent 35 years serving in the military, completing tours in Korea and Vietnam. Healy began his career with parachute training in Japan, then attended a number of Army Colleges, including Ranger School. He entered the Korean War as a Company Commander with the Airborne Rangers, a newly formed unit of the Army. Most of his career was spent in Vietnam, where he served five and a half tours, leading the 5th Special Forces Group for almost 20 months, and earning him his first Distinguished Service Medal.

== Early life and career ==
Michael D. Healy was born on June 13, 1926, in Chicago, Illinois., the first of four sons. His father, Daniel Healy, was a detective with the Chicago Police Department and Chief of Police for Stone Park, Illinois. In 1945, when Mike was 19 years old, he was attending Fenwick High School, a private Catholic Dominican college preparatory school in Oak Park, preparing for a life in the priesthood. Two months before the Hiroshima A-bomb, Mike joined some of his neighborhood friends, and enlisted in the United States Army at Fort Sheridan, Illinois. One year later, Healy graduated from Infantry OCS at Fort Benning, Georgia. Years later, he would be inducted into the OCS Hall of Fame. Private Healy's first assignment, with the 1st Cavalry Division and the Army of Occupation in Japan, involved investigation of Russian-backed Communists in post-war Japan. While in Japan, Healy completed intense parachute training, which would later earn him a master parachutist badge. It was there, too, that he met his wife, Jacklyn, the daughter of a US prosecutor in the International Military Tribunal for the Far East. Healy served many troop assignments in Japan until 1946, when he returned to the United States and married Jackie. Healy then attended the United States Army Airborne School and Ranger School.

== Korea ==
In 1951, then-Lieutenant Healy entered the Korean war as a company commander with the 4th Airborne Ranger Company. His leadership and courage were displayed on his first day of combat in March 1951, in Munsan-Ni, a tiny village in the South Korea. His company, the 3rd Platoon, was assigned to execute a parachute assault on the village. Because he was an extra officer on the mission, the senior officers loaded him down with extra map cases and spools of wire. The youthful Healy parachuted onto the roof of a hut and into a fire-fight. He lost his carbine to a grenade blast, and was stabbed in the groin by a North Korean soldier's bayonet. Healy said, "I held onto that little guy's trigger finger for dear life until a medic shot him dead." Nine of Healy's fellow soldiers were killed in the first three minutes of the attack. The 3rd Platoon was ordered to hold down the enemy at the base of a hill, while a regimental brigade attacked from above. When the platoon commander refused to proceed, Healy took charge. With his platoon under heavy fire, Healy and four others charged up the hill, at times with only the use of his ka-bar knife, managing to weave their way through the trenches. Healy and the four volunteers held the hill until the regiment finally arrived. For his actions in Munsan-Ni, Healy was awarded a Bronze Star Medal. It was his bravery there that established his nickname—Iron Mike. Upon his return to the United States, Healy attended the Infantry Officers Career Course and was subsequently assigned to the Special Warfare Center, Fort Bragg, North Carolina. For the next few years, he attended several more Army schools, including the US Marine Corps School, the USMC Officers Advanced School, Quantico, Virginia, and finally the Command and General Staff College in 1960 where Healy began to earn his reputation as a foreign intelligence specialist, and soon the Office of the Assistant Chief of Staff for Intelligence recruited him as Chief, Special Warfare Operations and Foreign Intelligence Branch.

== Vietnam ==
=== First tour ===
After his time in Korea, Healy was promoted to Major. He worked with the Special Forces in Third World and Iron Curtain countries, familiarizing himself with the local people and their combat abilities. He was assigned to the 10th Special Forces Group in Bad Tolz, Germany. His son, Kirk says, "He grew a moustache, and looked and fluently spoke the parts. He would tell me stories of how he had to smoke a cigarette a certain way, or order food or beer like a local lest he would give himself away, but the man took the details of all of those secret missions behind the Iron Curtain to the grave with him!" In July 1963, Healy was chosen for the sensitive position of Operations Officer and Senior Adviser to the Vietnamese Special Forces. He was entering Vietnam at a time when relatively few Americans were there. As Senior Adviser, Healy handpicked South East Asian mercenaries whom he trained and molded into mobile guerrilla battalions. These indigenous mercenaries were hired to work for the American military. The South Vietnamese troops could not always respond promptly enough to save American troops who were in danger, so Mike Healy relied heavily on his mobile units, which were named after him "Mike Forces," a term that is now part of the Army lexicon.

=== Second tour ===
From January to May 1964, Healy served as Liaison Officer to the South Vietnamese Special Forces. In June of that year he assumed the role of Assistant Personnel Officer in HQ 5th Special Forces Group (Airborne). In December 1964 Healy became the Group's Operations and Training Officer. Meanwhile, in August 1964, Healy assumed command of the 1st Battalion (Airborne), 501st Infantry, 101st Airborne Division. He remained in command of the 1-501st for almost two years before he was selected for the Army War College. But Healy felt a greater need to lead his "Geronimo" battalion back to battle in Vietnam telling his commander he did not want someone else taking his men in to combat, so he returned in June 1966 for his second tour of duty as CO of the renamed "Geronimos" - 4th Battalion, 503rd Infantry Tomahawks (The Rock). After nearly thirty months of consecutive battalion command (a record which stands today) Healy returned stateside to attend the Army War College. In 1967, after completing his courses, he was selected to serve as the Executive Officer and Special Assistant to the Deputy US Ambassador during the sensitive formation and initial operation of the Office of Civil Operations in Vietnam.

=== Third tour ===
Healy quietly returned to Vietnam in March 1969, as Commander of Special Troops and Assistant Chief of Staff, G1, XXIV Corps. He commanded the Special Troops until August, when he took charge of the 1st Brigade, 9th Infantry Division in the Mekong Delta.

=== Fourth tour ===
Three weeks after returning to Hawaii with his brigade, Healy was recalled to Vietnam to command the 5th Special Forces Group, and also to mend the reputation of the Green Berets, after the widely publicized murder of a double agent. Healy commanded the 5th Special Forces group for nearly twenty months before returning to the United States in March 1971. For his prompt return and lengthy service, Healy was awarded the Distinguished Service Medal, his first of two. Healy was next assigned as Chief of the Pacific Division and deputy director of Operations Directorate. He was then promoted to brigadier general and assigned to the 82nd Airborne Division at Fort Bragg, North Carolina.

=== Fifth tour ===
Brigadier General Healy spent the next eight months at Fort Bragg, North Carolina, as the Assistant Division Commander, 82nd Airborne Division. In 1972, for the second time, General Abrams requested his help. The war was drawing to an end, and Abrams needed the most qualified men leading the American troops. So in June, Brig. Gen. Healy said goodbye to his wife and six sons and returned to Vietnam for his last combat tour of duty. He was the Commanding General, 2nd Regional Assistance Command, Military Region Two. He remained in command until all US combat forces were ordered out of Vietnam. In 1963, Healy had been one of the first Americans to enter Vietnam. Ten years later he was still there, commanding a major portion of the US fighting forces at the end of US involvement.

== Retirement ==
After Vietnam, BG Healy took command of the John F. Kennedy Institute for Special Warfare, Fort Bragg, and was promoted to major general. He remained in command of the Institute until October 1975, when he was sent on his last overseas assignment. General Healy was stationed in Ankara, Turkey, as the Chief of Staff of Combined Military Planning. For two years he oversaw the joint military maneuvers around oil fields in the Mideast for the now defunct Central Treaty Organization, CENTO. In 1977, Gen. Healy returned to the United States to command the Army Readiness Region V at Fort Sheridan, where, 35 years before, he had enlisted as a private. This was General Healy's last assignment. He retired from active duty on February 28, 1981, after 35 years, seven months and 29 days of military service. He died on April 14, 2018, at the age of 91.

== Honors and awards ==
Throughout his 35-year military career, Michael Healy received many medals and awards. His decorations include Combat Infantry Badge (two awards), Distinguished Service Medal (three awards), Silver Star (two awards), Legion of Merit (three awards), Distinguished Flying Cross, Bronze Star with "V" (Valor) Device (six awards), Air Medal with "V" Device (four awards), Army Commendation Medal (two awards), Navy Commendation Medal with "V" Device, Purple Heart Medal (two awards), twelve Decorations of Republic of Vietnam. He received Parachute badges from Republic of Vietnam, Thailand, Cambodia, Korea, Iran and Pakistan. United States Badges include the Master Parachutist Badge, Special Forces Tab, Ranger Tab and Combat Diver (SCUBA) Badge.

== Legacy ==
General Healy has been the inspiration for two novels and also a feature film. In a 1975 interview the late-author Robin Moore told a Turkish newspaper that Healy was one of the few men from which he took inspiration to create his Col Kirby-character in his novel, "The Green Beret." Moore later repeated the same in a 1998 interview with Orlando Radio News Station WDBO. His book later became a movie with John Wayne as the lead character. In his book, "Viet Journal," the late author, James Jones wrote of Healy, "There was always one thing about Healy. You knew his aggressive physical courage was monumental and that his nerves were steel."

Healy was a member of Special Forces Association Chapter 37 in Chicago which was named for him.

In 2016, he was inducted as a Distinguished Member of the Special Forces Regiment. Mike had a special bond with the men he led and was a beloved hero of the Green Berets. He always credited his success to the men he led.(Video: https://www.youtube.com/watch?v=BwmyX4SqKms ) On October 5, 2018, Iron Mike was laid to rest at Arlington National Cemetery with full military honors.(Video: https://www.youtube.com/watch?v=JjEI624xGsk )

Healy was survived by his wife of 69 years, Jacklyn and 6 sons: Daniel F., Michael D. Jr, Timothy P., Sean C, F Kirk, Patrick A., ten grandchildren, and twelve great-grandchildren .
