= AN/PEQ-1 SOFLAM =

Laser target designator

AN/PEQ-1 SOFLAM (GLTD)
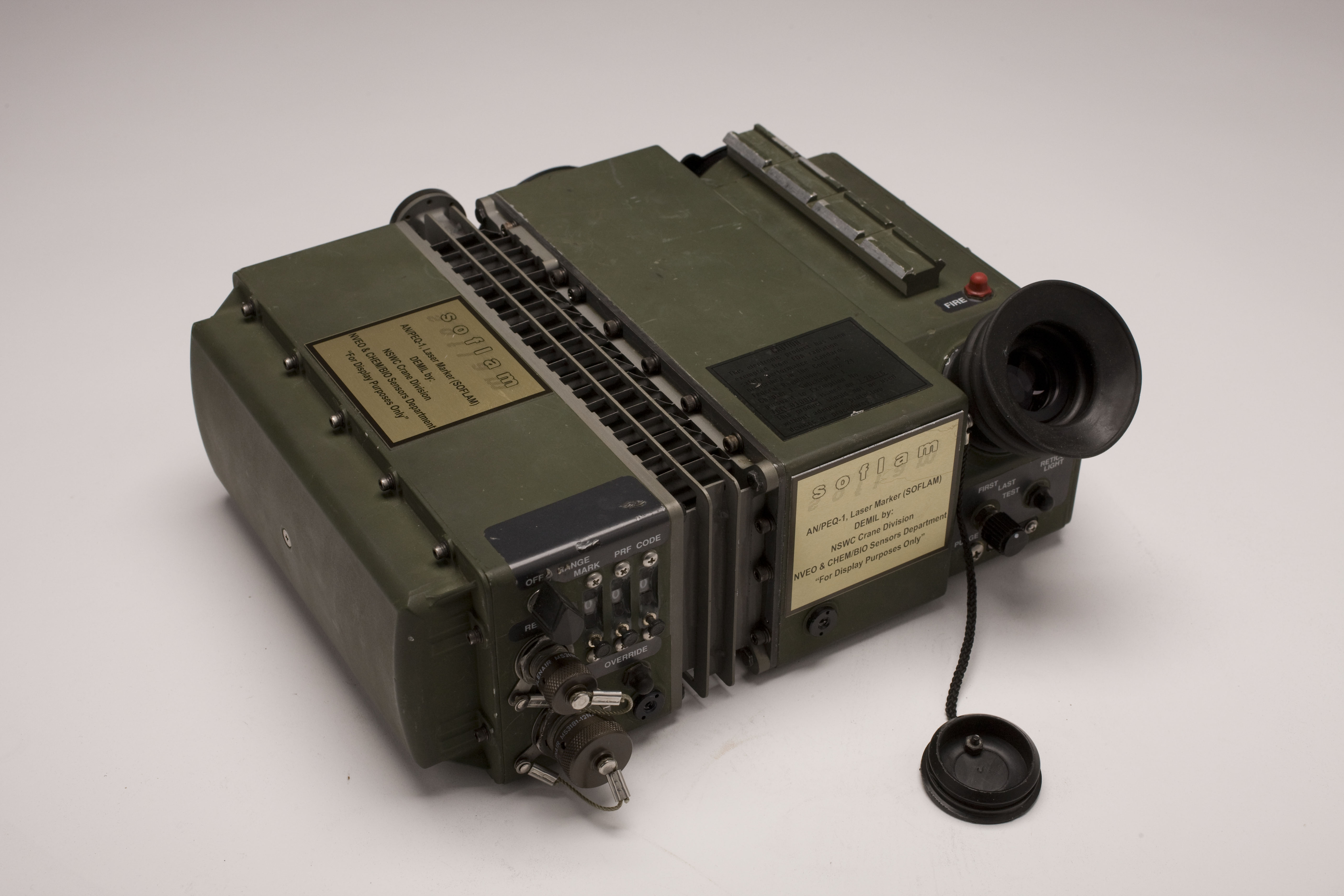
- AN/PEQ-1A SOFLAM
- Place of origin: United States

Service history
- Used by: United States Armed Forces
- Wars: War in Afghanistan, Iraq War

Production history
- Manufacturer: Northrop Grumman
- Variants: AN/PEQ-1; AN/PEQ-1A; AN/PEQ-1B GLTD II; AN/PEQ-1C GLTD III

General Specifications
- Dimensions (L×H×W): 11.2 in × 13.2 in × 5.2 in (28 cm × 34 cm × 13 cm)
- Weight: 11.3 lb (5.13 kg)
- Additional features: Tripod (adds 5.8 lb (2.63 kg))

Viewer Specifications
- Viewer FoV: 4.4°Hx5°V
- Zoom: 10x

Target Designator Specifications
- Target Designator Output (mw): 80 mJ
- Target Designator Divergence (mrad): 0.3 mrad
- Target Designator Wavelength (nm): 1064 nm Nd-YAG
- Target Designator Range (km): >10 km

Laser Rangefinder Specifications
- Rangefinder Output (mw): 80 mJ
- Rangefinder Divergence (mrad): 0.3 mrad
- Rangefinder Wavelength (nm): 1064 nm Nd-YAG
- Rangefinder Range (km): ~20 km
- Rangefinder Accuracy (m): 35 m

The AN/PEQ-1 also known as a Special Operations Forces Laser Acquisition Marker (SOFLAM or SOF-LAM) or the Ground Laser Target Designator (GLTD) is a U.S. military laser designator designed for use by special operations forces (SOF), including Combat Control Teams (CCT), Joint Terminal Attack Controllers (JTAC), and Tactical Air Control Parties (TACP), under rugged field conditions. Using the SOFLAM, soldiers can mark targets for close air support and artillery; in combination with GPS systems it can also generate coordinates for precision guided munitions. With the SOFLAM and other target designators, support fires can be called in extremely close to friendly forces while avoiding friendly fire.

In accordance with the Joint Electronics Type Designation System (JETDS), the "AN/PEQ-1" designation represents the first design of an Army-Navy electronic device for portable laser combination equipment. The JETDS system also now is used to name all Department of Defense electronic systems.

== History ==
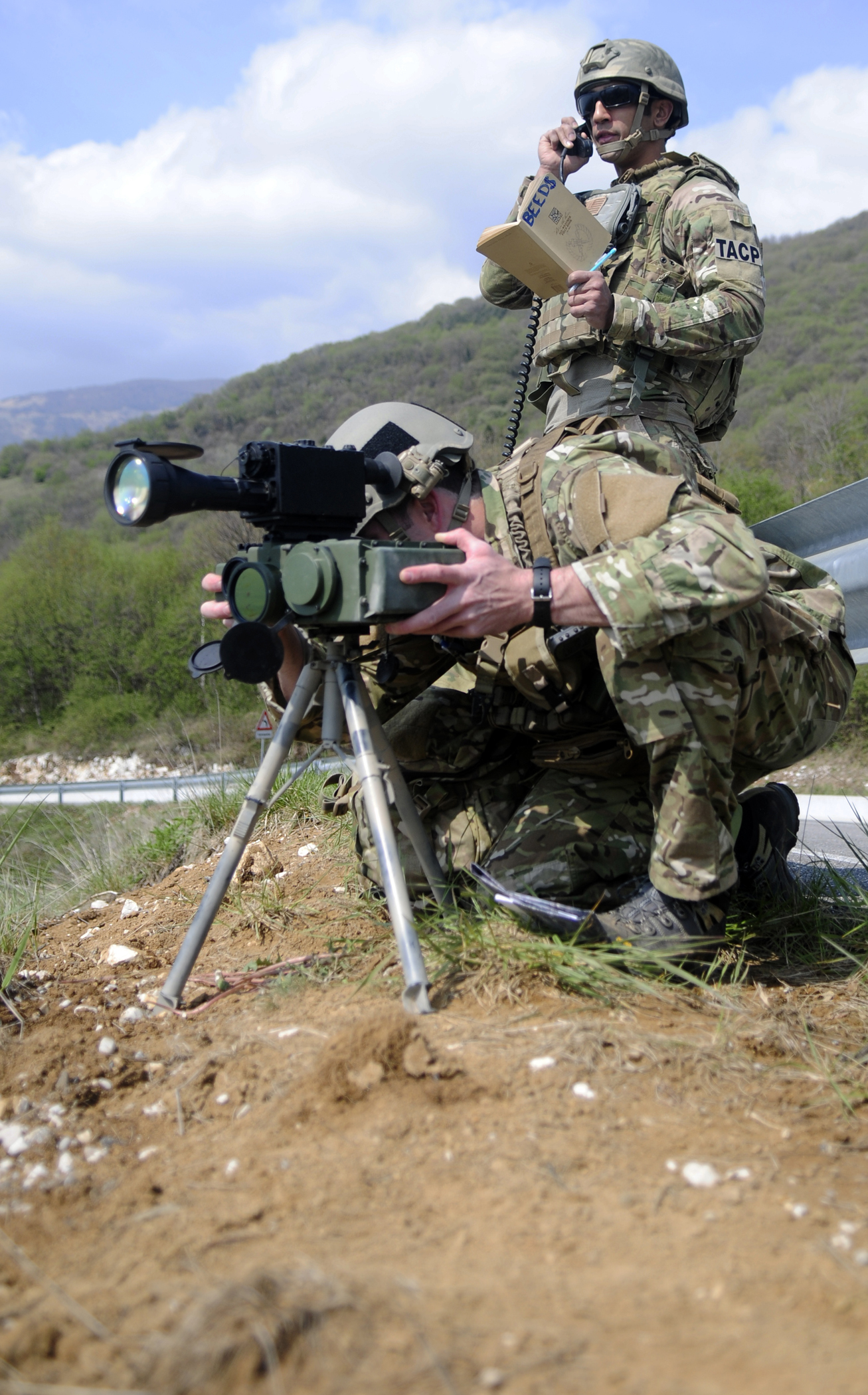
USAF Tactical Air Control Party operators using a SOFLAM during training at Aviano Air Base, Italy in 2012

The AN/PEQ-1 was first used in combat in the War in Afghanistan, then later in the Iraq War. Close air support called in via SOFLAM by SOF like the "Horse Soldiers" from 5th Special Forces ODAs, embedded CIA officers, and other forces, contributed heavily to US and allied victories during the invasion of Afghanistan. It was used during the capture of Mazar-i-Sharif, the capture of Bagram Airfield, and the Fall of Kandahar, among many other engagements.

Some complaints were made about its weight and power consumption which necessitated bringing multiple replacement batteries. In its earlier configurations, the AN/PEQ-1 did not have a laser rangefinder nor could it interface directly with GPS devices. Both the laser rangefinder and GPS interface capabilities were added with later versions. The AN/PEQ-1A offers rangefinding. The PEQ-1C incorporates an upgraded diode laser, replacing the power-hungry flash-lamp laser.

== See also ==
- Joint Electronics Type Designation System – Unclassified designation system for United States military electronic equipment
- List of military electronics of the United States
