= William Maud Bryant =

- Medal of Honor recipient
- Born: February 16, 1933; Cochran, Georgia, US
- Died: March 24, 1969 (aged 36); Long Khanh Province, Republic of Vietnam
- Military career
- Allegiance: United States
- Branch: United States Army
- Service years: 1953–1969
- Rank: Sergeant First Class
- Units: Company A, 5th Special Forces Group, 1st Special Forces
- Conflicts: Vietnam War †
- Awards: Medal of Honor; Purple Heart; Combat Infantry Badge; Parachutist Badge

William Maud Bryant (February 16, 1933 – March 24, 1969) was a United States Army Special Forces soldier and a recipient of America's highest military decoration—the Medal of Honor—for his actions in the Vietnam War.

== Biography ==
Bryant joined the Army from Detroit, Michigan in 1953. By March 24, 1969, he was serving as a Sergeant First Class in Company A of the 5th Special Forces Group, 1st Special Forces. On that day, in Long Khanh Province, Republic of Vietnam, Bryant led a company of South Vietnamese CIDG troops during an intense attack by North Vietnamese forces until being fatally wounded by enemy fire. For his actions during the battle, Bryant was awarded the Medal of Honor in 1971.

== Medal of Honor citation ==

For conspicuous gallantry and intrepidity in action at the risk of his life above and beyond the call of duty. Sfc. Bryant, assigned to Company A, distinguished himself while serving as commanding officer of Civilian Irregular Defense Group Company 321, 2d Battalion, 3d Mobile Strike Force Command, during combat operations. The battalion came under heavy fire and became surrounded by the elements of 3 enemy regiments. Sfc. Bryant displayed extraordinary heroism throughout the succeeding 34 hours of incessant attack as he moved throughout the company position heedless of the intense hostile fire while establishing and improving the defensive perimeter, directing fire during critical phases of the battle, distributing ammunition, assisting the wounded, and providing the leadership and inspirational example of courage to his men. When a helicopter drop of ammunition was made to re-supply the beleaguered force, Sfc. Bryant with complete disregard for his safety ran through the heavy enemy fire to retrieve the scattered ammunition boxes and distributed needed ammunition to his men. During a lull in the intense fighting, Sfc. Bryant led a patrol outside the perimeter to obtain information of the enemy. The patrol came under intense automatic weapons fire and was pinned down. Sfc. Bryant single-handedly repulsed 1 enemy attack on his small force and by his heroic action inspired his men to fight off other assaults. Seeing a wounded enemy soldier some distance from the patrol location, Sfc. Bryant crawled forward alone under heavy fire to retrieve the soldier for intelligence purposes. Finding that the enemy soldier had expired, Sfc. Bryant crawled back to his patrol and led his men back to the company position where he again took command of the defense. As the siege continued, Sfc. Bryant organized and led a patrol in a daring attempt to break through the enemy encirclement. The patrol had advanced some 200 meters by heavy fighting when it was pinned down by the intense automatic weapons fire from heavily fortified bunkers and Sfc. Bryant was severely wounded. Despite his wounds he rallied his men, called for helicopter gunship support, and directed heavy suppressive fire upon the enemy positions. Following the last gunship attack, Sfc. Bryant fearlessly charged an enemy automatic weapons position, overrunning it, and single-handedly destroying its 3 defenders. Inspired by his heroic example, his men renewed their attack on the entrenched enemy. While regrouping his small force for the final assault against the enemy, Sfc. Bryant fell mortally wounded by an enemy rocket. Sfc. Bryant's selfless concern for his comrades, at the cost of his life above and beyond the call of duty are in keeping with the highest traditions of the military service and reflect great credit upon himself, his unit, and the U.S. Army.

== See also ==
- List of Medal of Honor recipients for the Vietnam War
