= Monroe Edwards =

19th-century American forger and slave trader

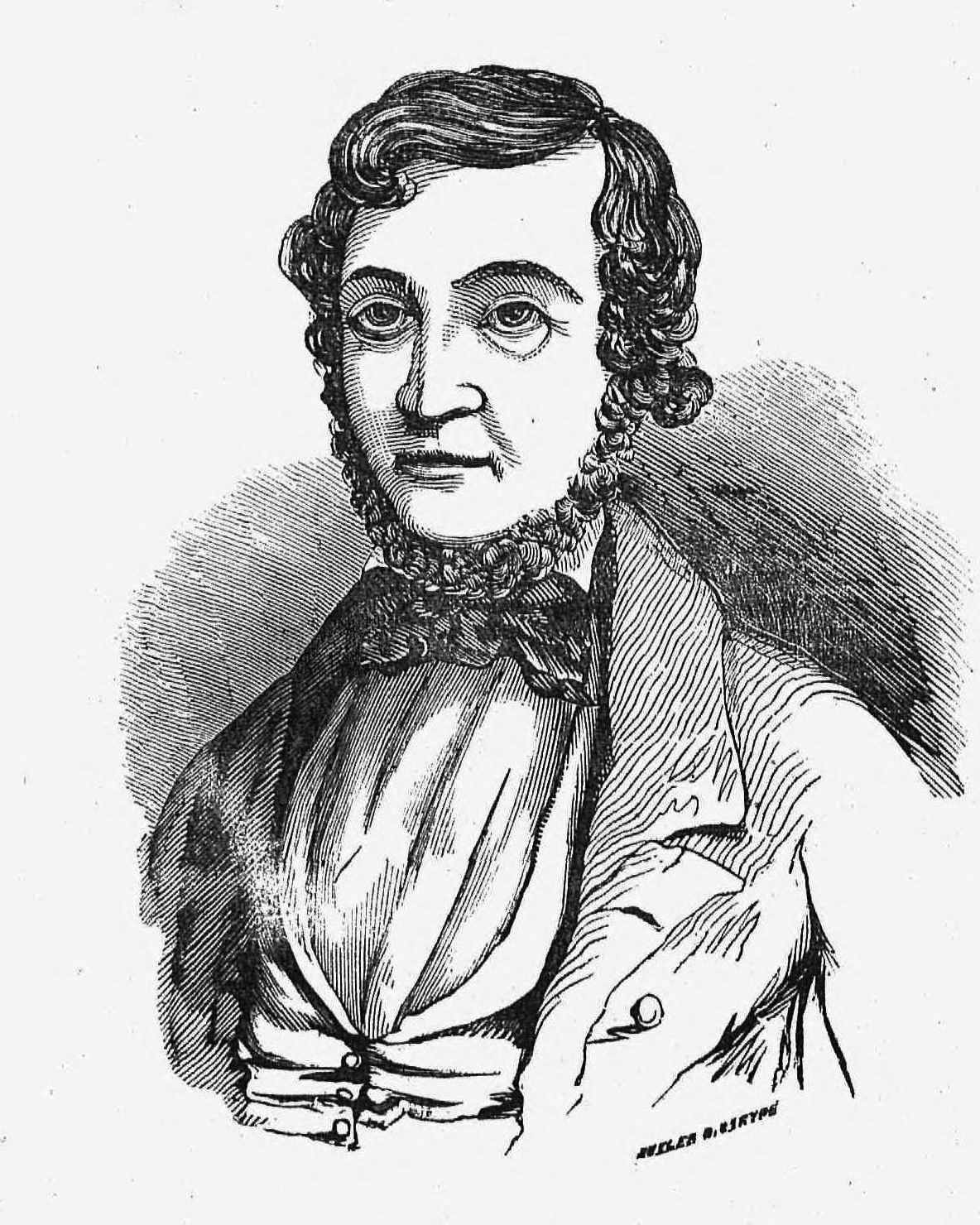
- A portrait engraving of Edwards from Life and Adventures of the Accomplished Forger and Swindler, Colonel Monroe Edwards, published a year after his death
- Born: 1808; Danville, Kentucky, United States
- Died: January 27, 1847 (aged 38–39); Sing Sing Prison, New York, United States
- Occupation: Slave trader
- Known for: Forgery
- Criminal charges: Multiple counts of forgery and fraud
- Criminal penalty: 10 years in prison

Monroe Edwards (1808 – January 27, 1847) was an American slave trader, forger, and criminal who was the subject of a well-publicized trial and conviction in 1842. Originally from Kentucky, Edwards moved to New Orleans then settled in Texas. He smuggled slaves into Brazil in 1832 and used the proceeds to purchase land in Texas. In 1836, he was again smuggling slaves, this time into Texas. After attempting to swindle his partner out of the profits of the venture, partly with forged documents, Edwards was forced to flee the Republic of Texas to the United States. He then tried to scam money out of various abolitionists in the United States and the United Kingdom, partly with forged letters of introduction. He traveled to the United Kingdom, but his schemes were mainly unsuccessful, and he returned to the United States in mid-1841.

Edwards' largest swindle involved forged letters from cotton brokers in New Orleans, which he used to secure bank drafts for large sums that he then cashed. His fabrications caught up with him, and he was arrested and tried for the forgeries in June 1842. Convicted partly because his distinctive good looks made him memorable and easily recognizable, and partly from making the same spelling errors in his fakes, Edwards was sentenced to 10 years in prison and died in 1847 while incarcerated. Several sensational accounts of his offenses and trial were published after his death, and he was mentioned in Herman Melville's 1853 short story "Bartleby, the Scrivener".

== Early life ==
Edwards was born in 1808 in Danville, Kentucky. His father was reported to be Amos or Moses Edwards, but his mother's name is unknown. He had a brother Amos and an uncle, Haden, who lived in Nacogdoches. Nothing is known with certainty of his childhood. As a grown man, he was considered very handsome and usually dressed fashionably. Some accounts give him the title "Colonel".

Around 1822, Edwards was sent to New Orleans to learn business from a merchant named Mr. Morgan. By the late 1820s, Morgan had established a trading post on San Jacinto Bay near Galveston in what was then Mexican Texas. Sometime after, Edwards met a slave trader and joined his new acquaintance on a smuggling trip to acquire slaves in Africa. This first effort ended when they were shipwrecked, but on a second attempt in 1832, they succeeded in smuggling slaves into Brazil. Edwards invested this venture's profits into land in Texas, where in late 1833 he established a plantation on the San Bernard River in present-day Brazoria County, Texas; he named his new home "Chenango". (Note: Edwards may have been the only American citizen in Texas to have gone to Africa to acquire slaves.) Unconnected with his slave trading, Edwards was arrested in 1832 as part of the Anahuac Disturbances, and was briefly imprisoned during the uprising against the Mexican government, which ruled Texas.

== Slave trading and forgery ==
Edwards' next efforts in smuggling involved a new partner, Christopher Dart, a lawyer from Natchez, Mississippi. In 1835, Dart invested $40,000 to buy the contracts of indentured blacks in Cuba and smuggle them into Texas as slaves. Instead of providing money for the partnership, Edwards' contribution was land certificates. At the time, Texas was a Mexican border province. In 1829, Mexico had abolished slavery as well as the importation of slaves, but gave Texas an exemption from emancipating slaves who were already in the territory. To circumvent the ban on importing slaves, traders instead reclassified them as indentured servants with 99-year contracts. The Mexican government cracked down on this practice in 1832, limiting terms of indenture to a maximum of 10 years. Edwards secured further financing from a New Orleans company named George Knight and Company and then went to Cuba where he purchased slaves.

In February 1836, Edwards landed 170 black people in Texas, taking advantage of the confusion surrounding the end of the Texas Revolution and the establishment of the independent Republic of Texas, which had not yet outlawed the importation of slaves. William Fisher, the customs collector on the Brazos River, wrote to the Texas Constitutional Convention that Edwards did not report the importation to the authorities, and Fisher went to Edwards' plantation to confront Edwards. Because of uncertainty about the legality of importing slaves, Fisher did not seize the slaves but referred the issue to the newly formed Texas Government after securing a monetary bond from Edwards. Although the new Texas Republic eventually outlawed the importation of slaves from anywhere but the United States, Edwards' landing of slaves from Cuba in early 1836 was never prosecuted. After this, Edwards also established a slave market on Galveston Bay, near present-day San Leon. In 1837, he was sued by Robert Peebles for fraud involving the sale of a slave with tuberculosis to Peebles. Peebles won the case.

Edwards then tried to change the deal with Dart. Instead of dividing the smuggled slaves between the two men, Edwards tried to keep all the slaves and instead repay the money Dart had advanced him, with some interest. Dart sued, and at the trial in March 1839, Edwards offered two forged documents claiming that Dart had sold his interest in the slaves to Edwards. In forging the documents, Edwards originally secured Dart's signature on a document written in a type of ink that could later be chemically removed. After Dart signed the document, Edwards then removed the original wording of the document and substituted a deed selling Dart's interest in the land and slaves. The documents were determined to be forgeries and on April 2, 1840, Dart was awarded $89,000 (~$2.7 million in 2024). Edwards fled the Republic of Texas to the United States.

As part of a plot to discredit both Dart and the government of Texas, Edwards persuaded some abolitionists in Cincinnati to give him money with which he would supposedly liberate the slaves on his plantation in Texas, which he no longer owned. Edwards also tried to get money from the American and Foreign Anti-Slavery Society in New York, but its leader, Lewis Tappan, did not trust him, and Edwards did not receive any money. Edwards then went to England, bearing forged letters of introduction from, among others, Daniel Webster and the American Secretary of State, John Forsyth. One of these letters was to Lord Spencer, who was so impressed he gave Edwards £250 as a loan. While in England, Edwards defrauded a company in Liverpool of about $20,000, and then used part of the funds to repay Lord Spencer. The Republic of Texas ambassador in London warned the English government against Edwards. Tappan also sent warnings, so Edwards was unable to acquire more money in England and returned to the United States by June 1841.

== Final scheme ==
Edwards' next fraudulent scheme involved forging letters to cotton brokers in New Orleans and using the signatures obtained from their replies to forge letters to brokers in New York City, saying that the fake John Caldwell – Edwards' alias – had a large amount of cotton on deposit with the New Orleans brokers. Edwards used those letters to secure fraudulent loans from brokers on the security of the non-existent cotton. Two New York brokers – Brown Bros. & Co. and Jacob Little – gave Edwards bank drafts for $25,000 each. Edwards then cashed the drafts pretending to be Caldwell, but without attempting to disguise his appearance. Unluckily for Edwards, in September 1841 Brown Brothers was informed by the New Orleans brokers that there was no cotton on account for Caldwell, and this prompted the bankers to offer a reward for information on the forger. The police began to search for the forger of the letters but were unsuccessful until Edwards attempted to distract their attention to an acquaintance, Alexander Powell, who happened to look much like him. Edwards sent an anonymous letter to the New York police, stating that the forger they were hunting was sailing to England, as Powell was about to do. Edwards assumed that by the time the police acted, Powell's ship would already have sailed. The ship was delayed and the police were able to catch Powell, who told them that Edwards was their forger.

After his arrest, Edwards was imprisoned in the Tombs, New York City's jail. When he was arrested, he had more than $44,000 in a trunk in his room. While in jail awaiting trial, Edwards forged a letter alleging he had funds in New Orleans, and then showed the letter to one of his lawyers to reassure the lawyer about Edwards' ability to pay for legal counsel. In an attempt to delay his trial, Edwards also forged a letter from a supposed witness, Charles Johnson, stating that he was in Cuba and would not be able to come and testify for Edwards for a while; this gained Edwards a three-month delay.

== Trial ==
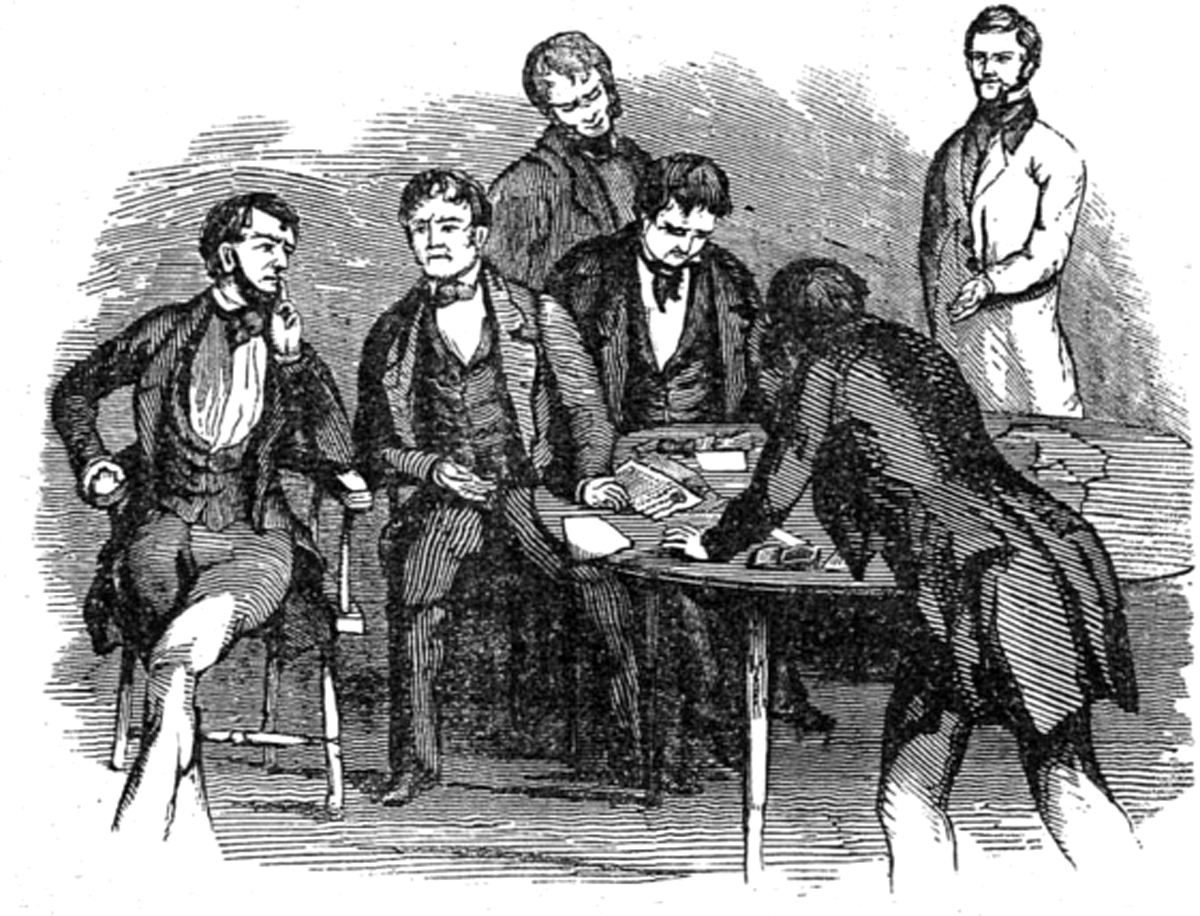
Depiction of Edward's trial, from Life and Adventures of the Accomplished Forger and Swindler, Colonel Monroe Edwards

Edwards' trial was in June 1842 and was a media sensation. He secured a defense team of six lawyers, including John J. Crittenden, a sitting U.S. Senator, and Thomas F. Marshall, a sitting U.S. Representative. Both Crittenden and Marshall absented themselves from their legislative duties during the trial. One of the junior lawyers was William M. Evarts, (Note: Evarts went on to be the first president of the New York Bar Association, United States Secretary of State, and a U.S. Senator.) who presented the opening remarks for the defense. Another defense lawyer was John Worth Edmonds, whom Edwards paid with a forged check. Edwards' handsome appearance worked against him when one of the bankers who had cashed the drafts identified him in court and remarked that he remembered Edwards because of his striking good looks. Edwards had also neglected to dispose of a marked bank bag from one of the banks that cashed the fraudulently obtained draft. A final tie-in was the commonality of misspellings between letters from Edwards and the forged letters. The trial ended with Edwards being convicted and given a 10-year prison sentence. (Note: Documents produced in the trial showed that Edwards was attempting to finance another slaving trip from Martinique into Texas by use of land he claimed to hold in Texas, although at the time the documents were written, it was not clear if Edwards still owned any land there.) The trial's proceedings were published by a New York newspaper, The Herald, and ran to 50,000 copies. None of Edwards' lawyers were ever paid for their services. He was sent to Sing Sing prison, where he attempted to use forged letters to escape. Edwards died in prison on January 27, 1847, of consumption. He was insane at the time of his death. (Note: Another account of his death states he died after a beating by prison guards.)

== Legacy ==
Edwards earned a mention in Herman Melville's story "Bartleby, the Scrivener". Melville used the names of contemporaneous events and people to give a contemporary feel to his short stories. One of his characters is imprisoned in the Tombs with the main character, and he asks if he is a "gentleman forger" like Edwards. The career of Melville's narrator in "Bartleby" parallels that of Edmonds, who defended Edwards then went on to be the prison inspector at Sing Sing during Edwards' prison term and was known for his attempts to improve the treatment of the prisoners. Melville's narrator also tries to secure better treatment for Bartleby. The narrator's description of Bartleby just prior to death "eerily echoed" the state of Edwards just prior to his death, in the words of Robert Wilson. (Note: Melville's short story appears to be set in the mid-1840s, but his mention of Edwards' death by consumption while still at Sing-Sing in 1847 is at odds with the rest of the historical events depicted as contemporary in the story.)

Edwards was known as the "Great Forger" during and after his trial. The main account of his life and trial is Life and Adventures of the Accomplished Forger and Swindler, Colonel Monroe Edwards, which was written by an editor of the National Police Gazette in 1848, probably by George Wilkes. It is the fullest account of Edwards' life, but mingles fact with fiction to the extent that it has been listed in bibliographies of American fiction. Wilkes' account is the source for the story of Kitty Clover, supposedly a slave who loved Edwards, rescued him, and followed him throughout his life. There are other accounts, including two anonymous narratives published in 1842.
