= Chenango, Texas =

Unincorporated community in Brazoria County, Texas, United States

- Unincorporated community
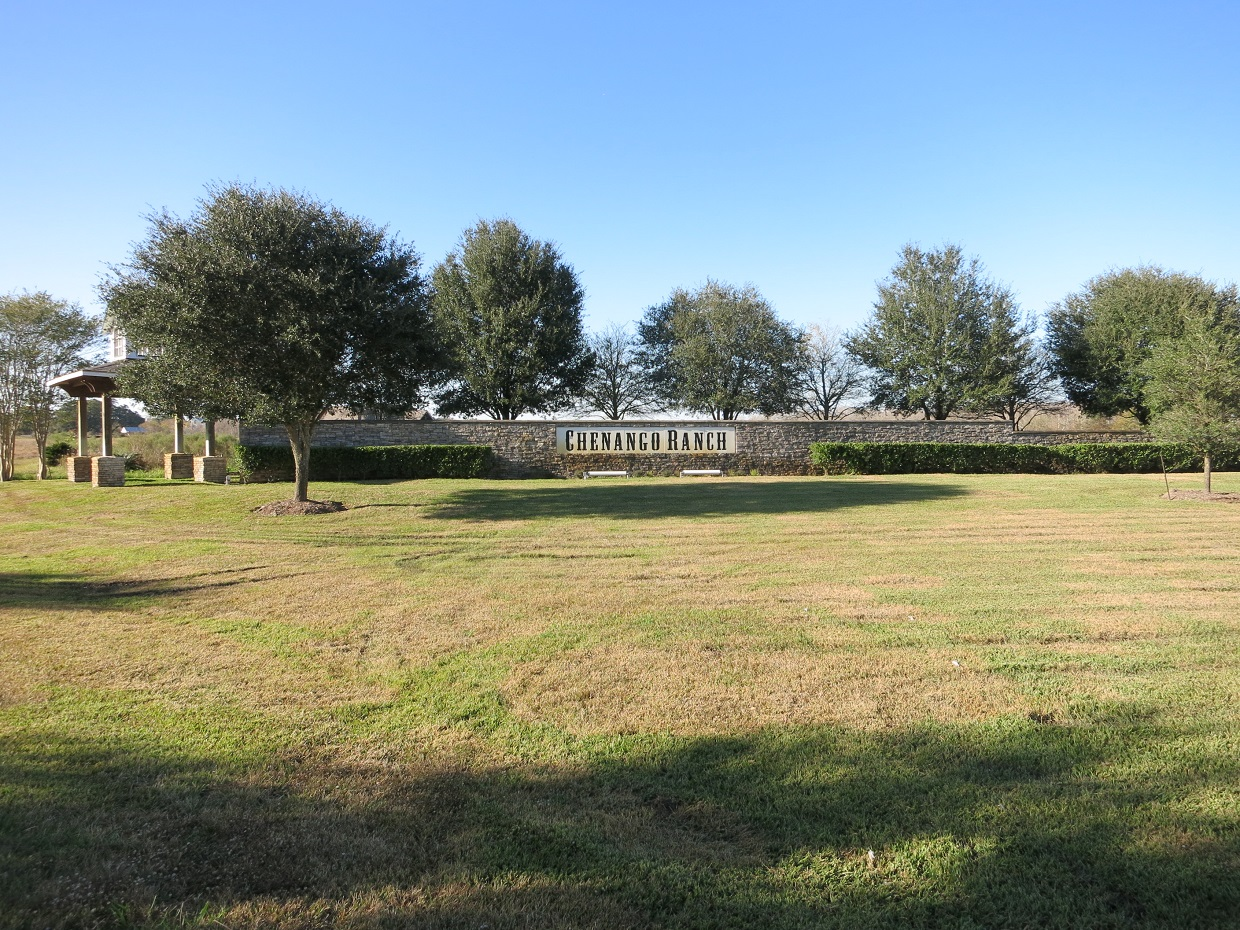
- Entrance to Chenango Ranch subdivision

- Location within Texas Location within the United States
- Coordinates: 29°15′15″N 95°27′32″W
- Country: United States
- State: Texas
- County: Brazoria
- Elevation: 39 ft (12 m)
- Time zone: UTC-6 (Central (CST))
  - Summer (DST): UTC-5 (CDT)
- Area code: 979
- GNIS feature ID: 1379536

Chenango is an unincorporated community in Brazoria County, Texas, United States. It is a part of the Greater Houston metropolitan area.

== History ==
The older town of Chenango, New York, is the namesake for this community. It was centered on Chenango Plantation, a 1,300-acre plantation carved out of the William Harris Survey during the 19th century. S. Richardson and Joshua Abbott added about 3,000 acres to the plantation. In 1835 (circa) Benjamin Fort Smith bought a portion of the 3,000 acres, along with Monroe Edwards and Christopher Dart, who converted the cotton production of the plantation to sugarcane. Monroe Edwards and Christopher Dart also used the plantation for slave smuggling to Texas from Cuba. It was known as "Parker's Point" in the 1840s when James Love and Albert T. Burnley became partners in the plantation. An officer of the Eighth Texas Cavalry Terry's Texas Rangers, Captain Sharpe, owned the plantation later. A post office was opened in Chenango in 1869 and closed in 1871, reopened in 1877, and closed after 1930. There were 40 residents in 1884, which became a station on the railroad. Its population went down by 10 residents but had two general stores in operation. It also had a cotton gin in 1914. It had 100 residents and four businesses in 1929. Two businesses closed and lost half of its population a decade later. It had 20 registered voters that next year. There was only one business in 1947. After 1950, though some oil production began and Chenango Plantation raised cattle and grew feed, the census no longer listed it.

== Geography ==
Chenango is located in Brazoria County at the intersection of State Highway 521 and the International & Great Northern Railroad, seven miles north of Angleton.

== Education ==
In 1906, Chenango had a white school with two teachers and twenty pupils. It also had a black school with 180 pupils and five teachers. By 1947, the white children attended school in the Angleton Independent School District while the black children continued to attend school in Chenango. Today, the community continues to be served by the Angleton ISD. Children in the area attend Rancho Isabella Elementary School, Angleton Junior High School, and Angleton High School in Angleton.

== Notable person ==
- Clarence Sasser, Medal of Honor recipient
