= John J. Duffy =

Retired United States Army Medal of Honor recipient

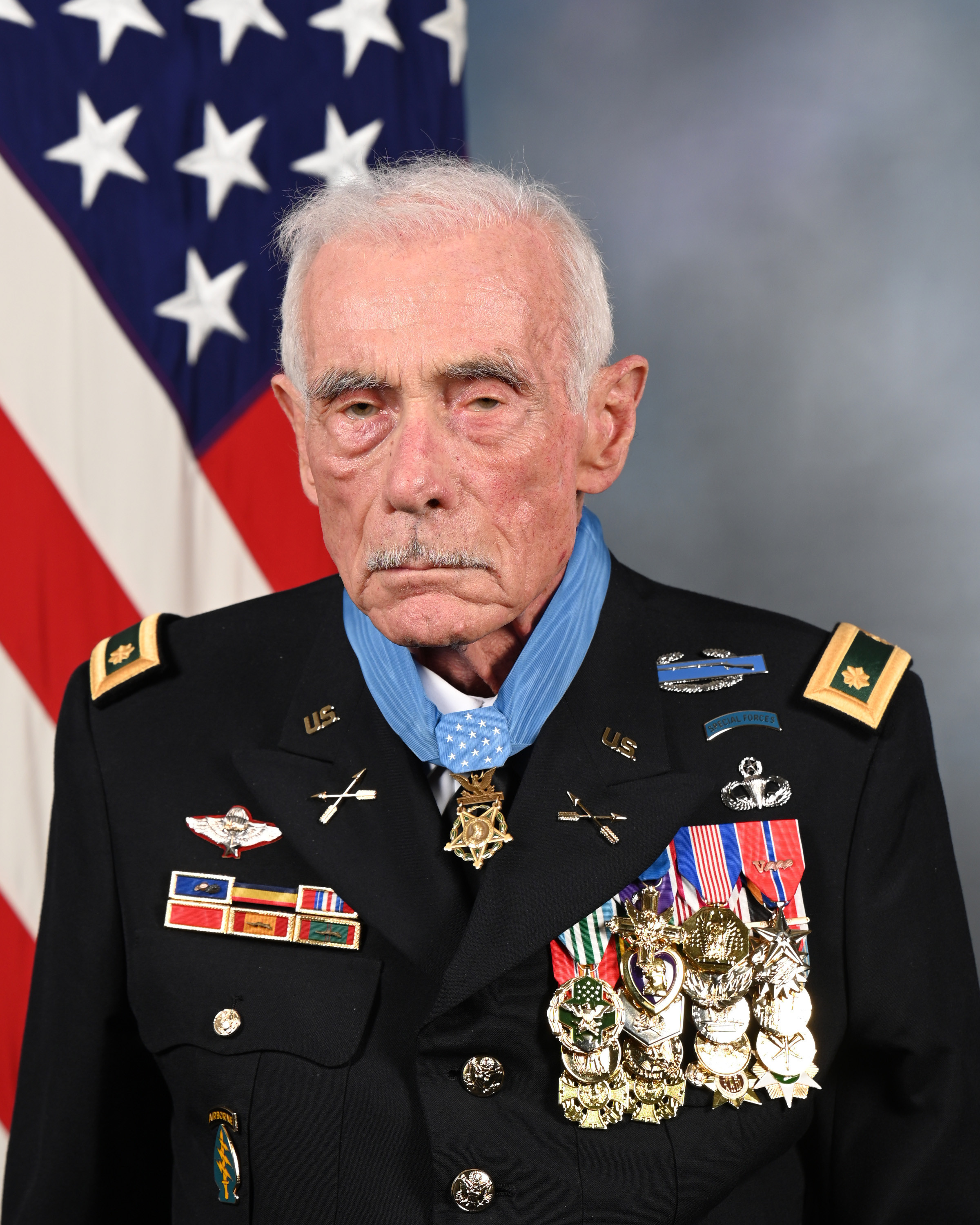
- Duffy in 2022
- Born: 16 March 1938 (age 88); New York, New York
- Military career
- Allegiance: United States
- Branch: United States Army
- Service years: 1955–1977
- Rank: Major
- Unit: 5th Special Forces Group
- Conflicts: Vietnam War: Easter Offensive (WIA)
- Awards: Medal of Honor; Soldier's Medal; Bronze Star Medal with V (4); Purple Heart (8); Air Medal (7)

John Joseph Duffy (born 16 March 1938) is a retired United States Army major who was awarded the Medal of Honor on 5 July 2022, for his actions during the Vietnam War.

== Military career ==
Duffy joined the United States Army in March 1955.

=== Vietnam War ===
Duffy served four combat tours in South Vietnam. In 1972, Duffy served as a special advisor with the Military Assistance Command Vietnam (MACV) Advisory Team 162, known as the “Red Hats”.

On 14 April 1972, during the North Vietnamese Easter Offensive, following a rocket and artillery barrage, the People's Army of Vietnam (PAVN) 320th Division attacked Firebase Charlie (14.576°N 107.778°E) 10 km from Dak To. Despite airstrikes and helicopter gunship support, Duffy and the 11th Airborne Battalion defenders were forced to abandon the base that night.

== Later life ==
Following his military service, Duffy was president of a publishing company and the founder and president of an investment firm which was bought by TD Ameritrade Inc.

Duffy has been nominated for the Pulitzer Prize and has published six books of poetry.

== Awards and decorations ==
=== Medal of Honor ===
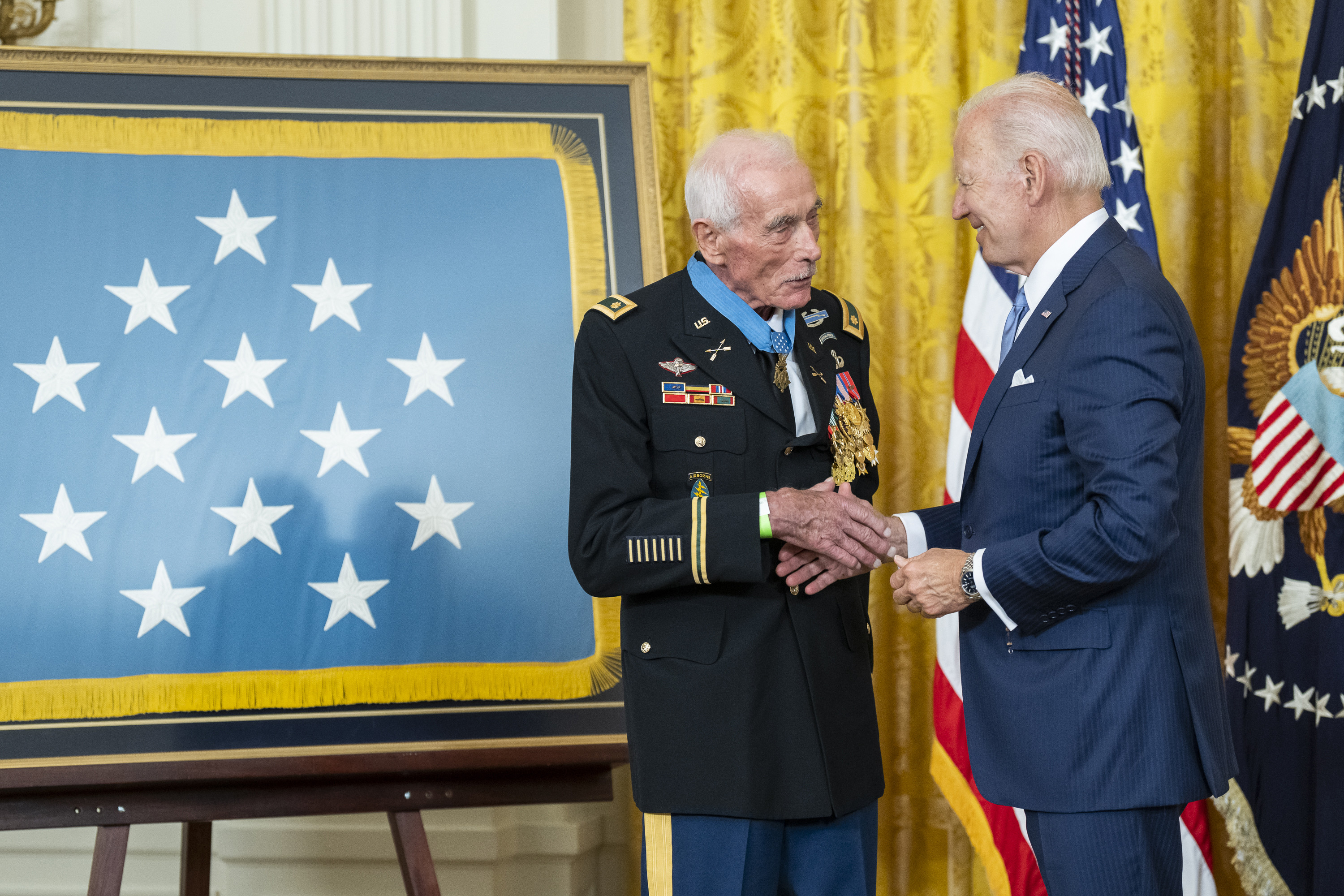
President Joe Biden awards the Medal of Honor to Major Duffy during a ceremony in July 2022

On 27 June 2022 it was announced that President Joe Biden would present the Medal of Honor to Duffy and three others on 5 July 2022.

Duffy was presented with the Medal of Honor on 5 July 2022 in a ceremony at the White House.

The text of Duffy's Medal of Honor citation reads:

Maj. John J. Duffy distinguished himself by acts of gallantry and intrepidity above and beyond the call of duty, while assigned to the 5th Special Forces Group and serving as a senior advisor to the 11th Airborne Battalion, 2nd Brigade, Airborne Division, Army of the Republic of Vietnam in the Republic of Vietnam, on April 14–15, 1972. Two days earlier, the commander of the 11th Airborne Battalion was killed, the battalion command post was destroyed, and Duffy was twice wounded but refused to be evacuated. Then on April 14, Duffy directed the defense of Fire Support Base Charlie, which was surrounded by a battalion-sized enemy element. In the morning hours, after a failed effort to establish a landing zone for resupply aircraft, he moved close to enemy anti-aircraft positions to call in airstrikes. At this time, Duffy was again wounded by fragments from a recoilless rifle round and again refused evacuation. Shortly after, the enemy began an artillery bombardment on the base and he remained in an exposed position to direct gunships onto the enemy positions, which eventually silenced the enemy fire. Following the bombardment, Duffy assessed the conditions on the base and personally ensured that wounded friendly foreign forces were moved to positions of relative safety and the remaining ammunition was appropriately distributed to the remaining defenders. The enemy resumed indirect fire on the base, expending an estimated 300 rounds. Nevertheless, Duffy remained in an exposed position to direct gunship fire on the enemy positions. In the late afternoon hours, the enemy began a ground assault from all sides of the firebase, and Duffy moved from position to position to adjust fire, spot targets for artillery observers and, ultimately, to direct gunship fire on a friendly position which had been compromised. During the early morning hours of April 15, the enemy ambushed the battalion, inflicting additional casualties and scattering some of the able-bodied service members. After withstanding the ambush, Duffy led the evacuees - many of whom were significantly wounded - to an established evacuation area, despite being continually pursued by the enemy. Upon reaching the exfiltration site, Duffy directed gunship fire on enemy positions and marked a landing zone for the helicopters. Only after ensuring all of the evacuees were aboard, did Duffy board while also assisting a wounded friendly foreign service member. Once on board, he administered aid to a helicopter door gunner who had been wounded during the evacuation. Duffy's extraordinary heroism and selflessness beyond the call of duty were in keeping with the highest traditions of military service and reflect great credit upon himself, his unit and the United States Army.

=== Commendations ===
Duffy was awarded the following throughout his military career:

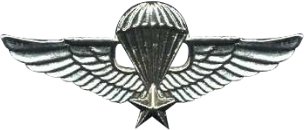

Badge	Combat Infantryman Badge			
Badge	Master Parachutist Badge			
1st row	Medal of Honor; Upgraded from the Distinguished Service Cross			
2nd row	Soldier's Medal	Bronze Star with "V" device and 3 Oak leaf clusters (4 awards for valor)	Meritorious Service Medal	Purple Heart with 1 silver and 2 bronze Oak leaf clusters (8 awards)
3rd row	Air Medal with Award numeral "6"	Joint Service Commendation Medal	Army Commendation Medal with "V" device and 2 Oak leaf clusters (3 awards for valor)	Army of Occupation Medal for Berlin, Germany
4th row	National Defense Service Medal with 1 Service star	Armed Forces Expeditionary Medal	Vietnam Service Medal with 1 silver and 1 bronze Campaign stars	Army Service Ribbon
5th row	Armed Forces Reserve Medal	Vietnamese Gallantry Cross with palm	Vietnamese Gallantry Cross with 1 silver star	Vietnam Campaign Medal
Badges	South Vietnamese Parachutist badge		Special Forces Tab	

=== Unit Citations ===

Presidential Unit Citation Army/Air Force

Presidential Unit Citation Navy/Marine Corps

Valorous Unit Award

Meritorious Unit Citation

Republic of Vietnam Gallantry Cross Unit Citation

Republic of Vietnam Meritorious Unit Citation (Civil Action)
