= Fred Zabitosky =

United States Army Medal of Honor recipient

Fred William Zabitosky
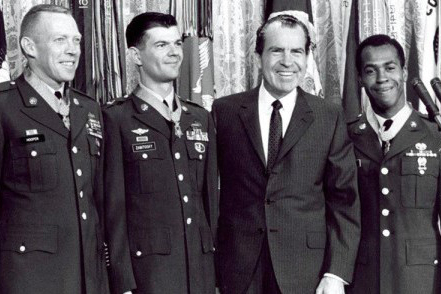
- SFC Fred Zabitosky 2nd from Left receiving his Medal of Honor From President Nixon
- Born: October 27, 1942; Trenton, New Jersey, U.S.
- Died: January 18, 1996 (aged 53); Durham, North Carolina, U.S.
- Burial place: Lumbee Memorial Park, Lumberton, North Carolina
- Military career
- Allegiance: United States
- Branch: United States Army
- Service years: 1959 - 1977
- Rank: Master Sergeant
- Nickname: "Zab"
- Units: 5th Special Forces Group; MACV-SOG
- Conflicts: Vietnam War
- Awards: Medal of Honor; Bronze Star; Purple Heart

Fred William Zabitosky (October 27, 1942 – January 18, 1996) was a United States Army soldier and a recipient of the United States military's highest decoration — the Medal of Honor — for his actions in the Vietnam War.

== Biography ==
Zabitosky joined the Army from his birth city of Trenton, New Jersey in 1959, and by February 19, 1968, was serving as a staff sergeant with the 5th Special Forces Group (Airborne). On that day, while on reconnaissance patrol in Laos, his small team came under intense enemy fire. Zabitosky directed the defense until rescue helicopters arrived, and when the helicopter that was to extract him from the battlefield crashed, he ignored his own injuries to save the downed craft's pilot. Zabitosky was later promoted to Sergeant First Class and, in 1969, was presented with the Medal of Honor by President Richard Nixon. He retired from the Army with the rank of Master Sergeant in 1977, and later continued working for the Department of Veterans Affairs as a civilian counselor.

Zabitosky died at the age of 53, after undergoing surgery to treat a brain tumor. He was buried in Lumbee Memorial Park, Lumberton, North Carolina. A street, the former Community Access Road, on nearby Fort Bragg was named in his honor.

== Medal of Honor citation ==
Sergeant First Class Zabitosky's official Medal of Honor citation reads:

For conspicuous gallantry and intrepidity in action at the risk of his life above and beyond the call of duty. Sfc. Zabitosky, U.S. Army, distinguished himself while serving as an assistant team leader of a 9-man Special Forces long-range reconnaissance patrol. Sfc. Zabitosky's patrol was operating deep within enemy-controlled territory when they were attacked by a numerically superior North Vietnamese Army unit. Sfc. Zabitosky rallied his team members, deployed them into defensive positions, and, exposing himself to concentrated enemy automatic weapons fire, directed their return fire. Realizing the gravity of the situation, Sfc. Zabitosky ordered his patrol to move to a landing zone for helicopter extraction while he covered their withdrawal with rifle fire and grenades. Rejoining the patrol under increasing enemy pressure, he positioned each man in a tight perimeter defense and continually moved from man to man, encouraging them and controlling their defensive fire. Mainly due to his example, the outnumbered patrol maintained its precarious position until the arrival of tactical air support and a helicopter extraction team. As the rescue helicopters arrived, the determined North Vietnamese pressed their attack. Sfc. Zabitosky repeatedly exposed himself to their fire to adjust suppressive helicopter gunship fire around the landing zone. After boarding 1 of the rescue helicopters, he positioned himself in the door delivering fire on the enemy as the ship took off. The helicopter was engulfed in a hail of bullets and Sfc. Zabitosky was thrown from the craft as it spun out of control and crashed. Recovering consciousness, he ignored his extremely painful injuries and moved to the flaming wreckage. Heedless of the danger of exploding ordnance and fuel, he pulled the severely wounded pilot from the searing blaze and made repeated attempts to rescue his patrol members but was driven back by the intense heat. Despite his serious burns and crushed ribs, he carried and dragged the unconscious pilot through a curtain of enemy fire to within 10 feet of a hovering rescue helicopter before collapsing. Sfc. Zabitosky's extraordinary heroism and devotion to duty were in keeping with the highest traditions of the military service and reflect great credit upon himself, his unit, and the U.S. Army.

== See also ==
- List of Medal of Honor recipients
- List of Medal of Honor recipients for the Vietnam War
