= Teddy G. Allen =

American Army general

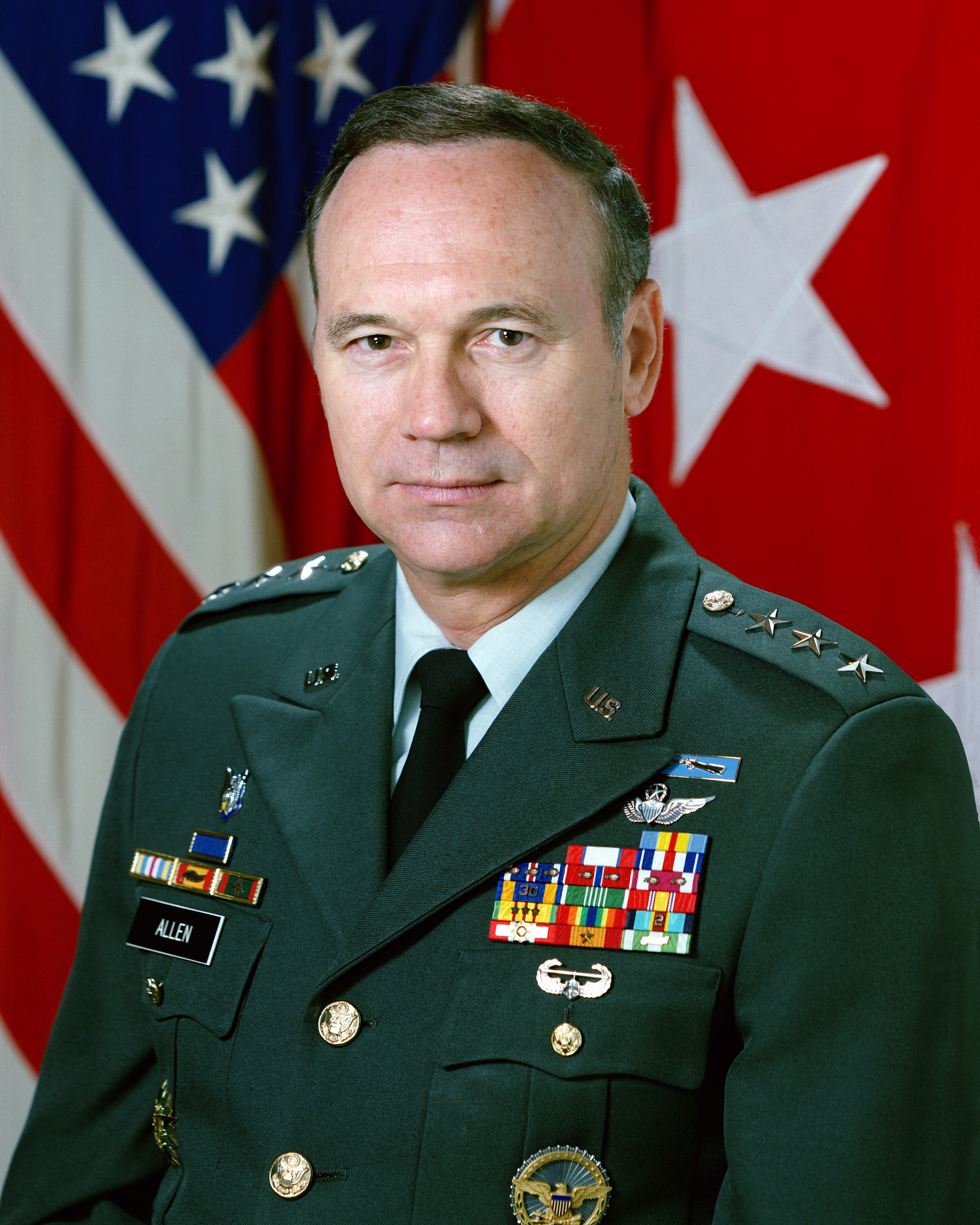
- Born: 19 May 1936 (age 90); Farmville, North Carolina, U.S.
- Military career
- Allegiance: United States
- Branch: United States Army
- Service years: 1958–1993
- Rank: Lieutenant General
- Commands: Defense Security Assistance Agency; 101st Airborne Division; Joint United States Military Advisory Group, Philippines; 101st Aviation Group
- Conflicts: Vietnam War
- Awards: Defense Distinguished Service Medal; Army Distinguished Service Medal; Silver Star Medal; Distinguished Flying Cross (4); Bronze Star Medal (3); Meritorious Service Medal (3); Air Medal (30)

Teddy Gray Allen (born 19 May 1936) is a retired lieutenant general in the United States Army who served as director of the Defense Security Assistance Agency from 1990 to 1993. He previously served as commanding general of the 101st Airborne Division from 1987 to 1989.

== Early life and education ==
Born and raised in Farmville, North Carolina, Allen graduated from North Carolina State College in June 1958 with a B.S. degree in agricultural education. He was commissioned through the Army ROTC program and sent to infantry school and aviation school, graduating from flight training in 1961. Allen later earned an M.A. degree in education from George Washington University. He is also a graduate of the Army Command and General Staff College and the Air War College.

== Military career ==
Allen served three combat tours in Vietnam. He was awarded the Silver Star Medal, four Distinguished Flying Crosses, three Bronze Star Medals and thirty Air Medals. Returning to the United States, he served as an aviation battalion commander and then as the aviation group commander for the 101st Airborne Division (Air Assault) at Fort Campbell. Allen was a pioneer in the use of night vision goggles for combat aviation.

Approved for promotion to brigadier general on 21 September 1983, he served as chief of the Joint U.S. Military Advisory Group, Republic of the Philippines. While there, he arranged the evacuation of President Ferdinand Marcos and his family to Guam on 25 February 1986.

Approved for promotion to major general on 19 June 1986, Allen served as chief of staff, Second United States Army; commanding general, 101st Airborne Division; and Deputy Inspector General (Inspections), Office of the Inspector General, Department of the Army.

His promotion to lieutenant general was authorized by the U.S. Senate on 22 June 1990. He became director of the Defense Security Assistance Agency on 1 September 1990.

Allen retired from active duty in 1993 after thirty-five years of military service.

== Personal life ==
Allen is the son of Ichabod Allen (24 April 1909 – 5 December 1989) and Annie Pearl (Vick) Allen (9 December 1911 – 22 March 1987). They were married in 1929.
