= Scott L. Thoele =

American military officer (b. 1958)

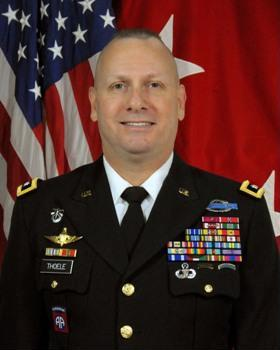
Maj. Gen. Scott Thoele

Scott L. Thoele (born 1958) is a retired major general in the National Guard of the United States. His final assignment was as Deputy Commanding General for the Reserve Component of United States Army Forces Command. Thoele previously served as Deputy Commanding General, Army National Guard, United States Army Combined Arms Center, Fort Leavenworth. He retired on 30 September 2015 after 14 years of service in the U.S. Army and 21 years of service in the Illinois Army National Guard.

== Career ==
Thoele was commissioned an officer in the United States Army in 1980. After serving with the 82nd Airborne Division and the 12th Special Forces Group, during which time he was deployed to serve in the Gulf War, he transferred to the Army National Guard and was given a command in the 20th Special Forces Group. In 2004, he was stationed at The Pentagon. From 2005 to 2006, he served in the Iraq War. Later, he served in the War in Afghanistan (2001–present) from 2008 until 2009. He received his current assignment later that year.

Awards he has received include the Legion of Merit, the Bronze Star Medal with oak leaf cluster, the Meritorious Service Medal with silver oak leaf cluster, the Army Commendation Medal, the Army Achievement Medal, the Army Reserve Components Achievement Medal with silver and two bronze oak leaf clusters, the National Defense Service Medal with service star, the Armed Forces Expeditionary Medal, the Southwest Asia Service Medal with service star, the Afghanistan Campaign Medal with service star, the Iraq Campaign Medal with two service stars, the Global War on Terrorism Service Medal, the Humanitarian Service Medal, the Military Outstanding Volunteer Service Medal, the Armed Forces Reserve Medal with gold hourglass device, mobilization device and award numeral "4"; the Army Service Ribbon, the Overseas Service Ribbon with award numeral "3", the Meritorious Unit Commendation, the Superior Unit Award, the Special Forces Tab, the Ranger Tab, the Combat Infantryman Badge, the Combat Action Badge, the Expert Infantryman Badge, the Master Parachutist Badge and the Kuwait Liberation Medal (Kuwait).

As a civilian, Thoele is vice president and credit analyst of First Bankers Trust Company in Quincy, Illinois. He received his education at Quincy University and the University of Wisconsin-Madison.
