= 20th Special Forces Group =

Special Forces Group of the United States Army National Guard

20th Special Forces Group (Airborne)
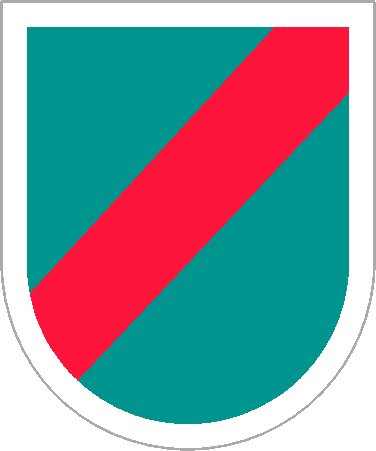
- 20th SFG(A) beret flash
- Active: 1 May 1961 – present
- Country: United States
- Branch: United States Army; Army National Guard
- Type: Special Forces
- Role: Primary tasks: Unconventional Warfare (UW); Foreign Internal Defense (FID); Direct Action (DA); Counter-Insurgency (COIN); Special Reconnaissance (SR); Counter-Terrorism (CT); Information Operations (IO); Counterproliferation of WMD (CP); Security Force Assistance (SFA)
- Part of: United States Special Operations Command; United States Army Special Forces Command; 1st Special Forces Command; Alabama Army National Guard
- Garrison/HQ: Birmingham, Alabama
- Engagements: Vietnam War; Gulf War; war on terrorism; War on ISIS

Commanders
- Current commander: Colonel Ronald Guernsey

Insignia
- Former 20th SFG(A) recognition bar, worn by non-special operations qualified soldiers—in lieu of a beret flash—from the 1960s to 1984

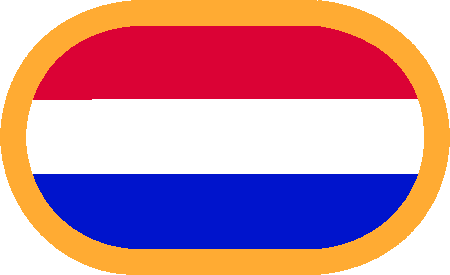
- 20th SFG(A) background trimming

- 1st Special Forces Command (Airborne) distinctive unit insignia, worn by all SFG(A)s and the 1st SFC(A)

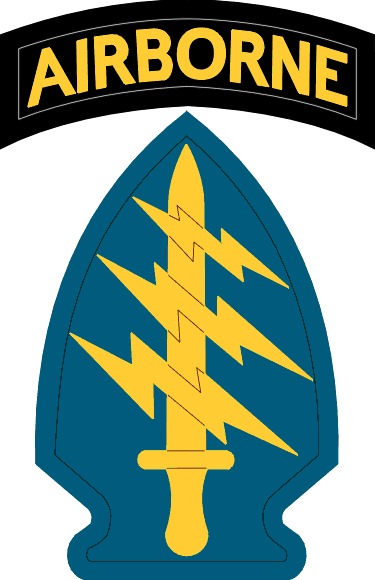
- 1st Special Forces Command (Airborne) shoulder sleeve insignia, worn by all 1st SFC(A) units

The 20th Special Forces Group (Airborne) (20th SFG) (A) is one of two Army National Guard groups for the United States Army Special Forces. 20th Group—as it is sometimes called—is designed to deploy and execute nine doctrinal missions: unconventional warfare, foreign internal defense, direct action, counter-insurgency, special reconnaissance, counter-terrorism, information operations, counterproliferation of weapon of mass destruction, and security force assistance.

It is headquartered in Birmingham, Alabama (and is thus part of the Alabama Army National Guard) and as part of the United States Southern Command has an area of responsibility covering 32 countries, including Latin America south of Mexico, the Caribbean, the Gulf of Mexico, and the southwestern Atlantic Ocean. The area is shared with the Eglin Air Force Base–based 7th Special Forces Group, which is the active Regular Army Special Forces group responsible for the same region.

Following the start of the global war on terror the 20th has been actively deployed to Iraq, Afghanistan and other places around the world.

== History ==
=== 1990s ===
The first large scale activation of the 20th Special Forces Group took place during the first Gulf War. The unit was mobilized and based at Fort Bragg, North Carolina for training. The 7th Special Forces Group supported and validated the training. The war ended quickly and the 20th Group was soon deactivated. Some individual members did participate in the conflict as augmentees to other Special Forces groups or organizations.

As many as 50 individuals served as augmentees to the 10th Special Forces Group and deployed to Turkey and northern Iraq during Operation Provide Comfort.

The 20th Special Forces Group also provided several rotations of companies to the operation in Haiti during 1995 during Operation Uphold Democracy.

=== 2000s–present ===
The 3rd Battalion, 20th Special Forces Group deployed a significant number of its battalion headquarters to augment the Combined Joint Special Operations Task Force - Afghanistan (CJSOTF-A). At the time the CJSOTF-A was led and manned by the 3rd Special Forces Group. The 3rd Battalion also provided companies to the fight in the early states of Operation Enduring Freedom. The 20th Special Forces Group headquarters and support staff was activated in the spring of 2002, trained up at Fort McClellan, Alabama, and then deployed to Afghanistan to lead and man the CJSOTF-A. It was augmented by several officers and NCOs of 7th Special Forces Group. In addition, the 1st Battalion deployed to Karshi-Khanabad Air Base, "K2," in Uzbekistan and basing AOBs and teams throughout northern and eastern Afghanistan. At the same time a battalion of the 19th Special Forces Group was based at Kabul Military Training Center just north of Kabul to train up the initial battalions of the Afghan National Army. The 2nd Battalion, 7th Group was based at Kandahar. 2nd Battalion 20th Special Forces Group would replace 1st Battalion at K2 in 2003. At this point, the entire unit had deployed to Afghanistan. The 20th Special Forces Group would continue to deploy its companies and battalions to Afghanistan for almost two decades. In addition, numerous individuals would serve as augmentees to several different organizations in Afghanistan over the years. The 20th Special Forces Group headquarters and support company was activated in 2011 and deployed to Afghanistan to augment the CJSOTF-A, and CFSOCC-A.

Several individual augmentees from the 20th Special Forces Group served with various units in Iraq in the early stages (2003–2004) of the conflict - to include the CJSOTF-AP. Eventually almost all of the 20th Special Forces Group battalions and companies would rotate at least one time through Iraq from 2006 to 2011.

Several companies and numerous individual augmentees would deploy in support of Operation Inherent Resolve to Iraq.

For several years the 20th Special Forces Group manned the Special Operations Command and Control Element (SOCCE) Horn of Africa (HOA) located at Camp Lemonier, Djibouti.

In March 2024, an Instagram post from 20th SFG featured a soldier photographed wearing a helmet patch containing the Nazi SS Totenkopf "Death's Head" skull and a partial Afrika Korps seal. Initially, a public affairs officer from 20th SFG denied the association, defending and downplayed the post, claiming the patch was a "3rd group team patch taken out of context," (referencing a prior incident in which a 3rd SFG operator was similarly featured on social media wearing a team patch featuring Nazi insignia; the patch was subsequently banned.) The Army initially made "conflicting statements" about the patch, before quickly deleting the post after receiving "hundreds of comments" of criticism, prompting an investigation. According to a USASOC spokesperson, "The use of symbols and patches depicting historic images of hate are not tolerated and a clear violation of our values," and that "We are aware of the situation and looking into the matter further."

== Subordinate units ==
The 20th Special Forces Group is headquartered in Birmingham, Alabama, with companies and battalions in the following locations:

- 20th Special Forces Group Headquarters (Birmingham, Alabama)
  - Group Support Battalion (Gadsden, Alabama)
  - Military Intelligence Company (Louisville, Kentucky)
  - 1st Battalion HHC (Fort Payne, Alabama)
    - Company A (Auburn, Alabama)
    - Company B (Albemarle, North Carolina)
    - Company C (Chicopee, Massachusetts)
  - 2nd Battalion HHC (Jackson, Mississippi)
    - Company A (Camp Atterbury, Indiana)
    - Company B (Glen Arm, Maryland)
    - Company C (Camp McCain, Mississippi)
  - 3rd Battalion HHC (Camp Blanding, Starke, Florida)
    - Company A (Ocala, Florida)
    - Company B (Roanoke Rapids, North Carolina)
    - Company C (Wauchula, Florida)
    - Company D (Starke, Florida)
    - Company E (Starke, Florida)

== Notable current and former unit members ==
- Tim Kennedy, retired mixed martial artist who has fought in the UFC, Strikeforce, the WEC
- Scott L. Thoele, retired U.S. Army general officer
- Mike Waltz, former US Congressman (FL), National Security Advisor, United States Ambassador to the United Nations
- Barry Seal, CIA connected drug trafficker

== Gallery ==
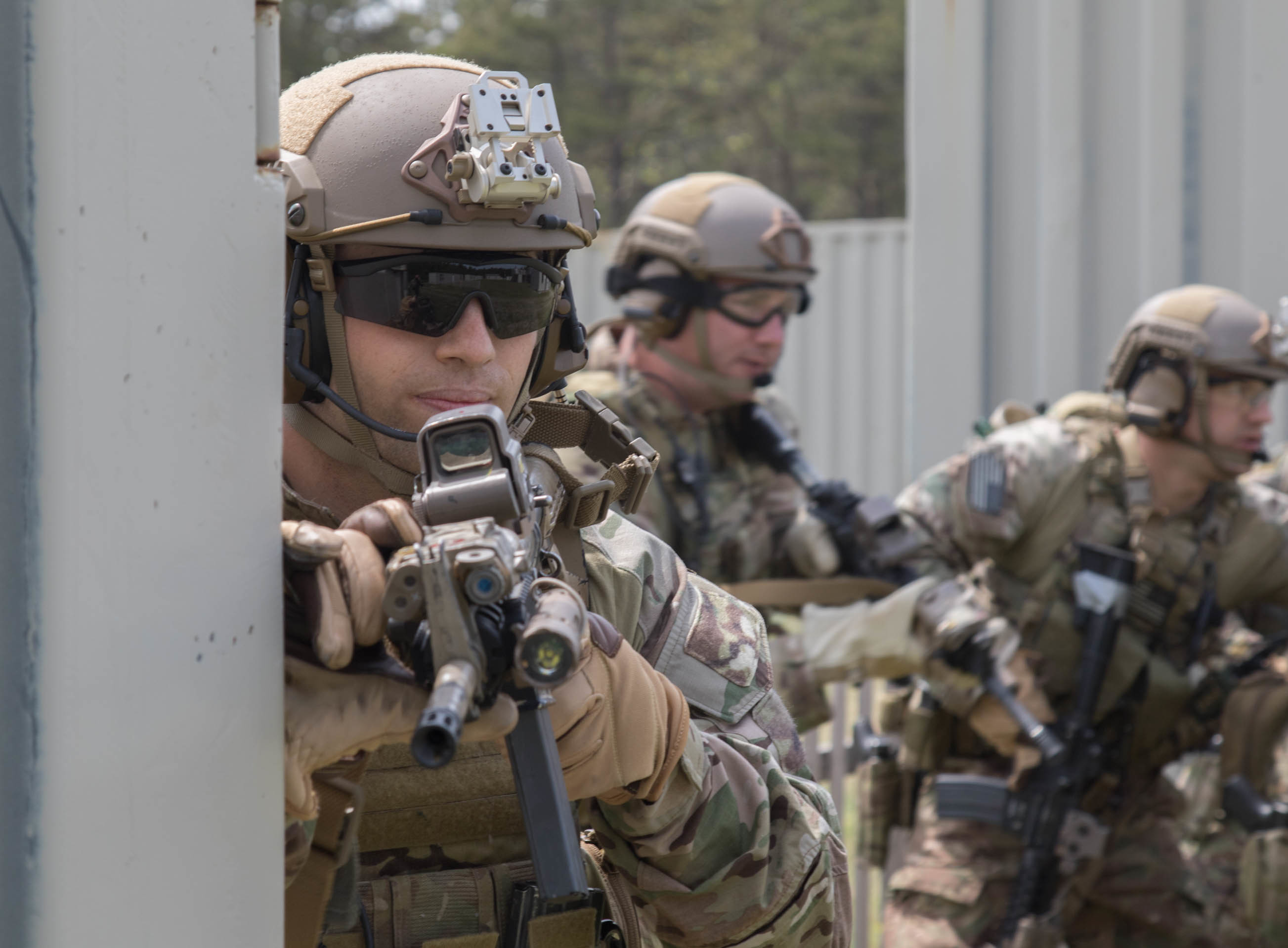
Soldiers from the 20th Special Forces Group, Massachusetts National Guard prepare to raid an objective during training here, June 8, 2018. The highly trained and specialized soldiers are taking part in a combined arms exercise that tests the capabilities of combat support units.

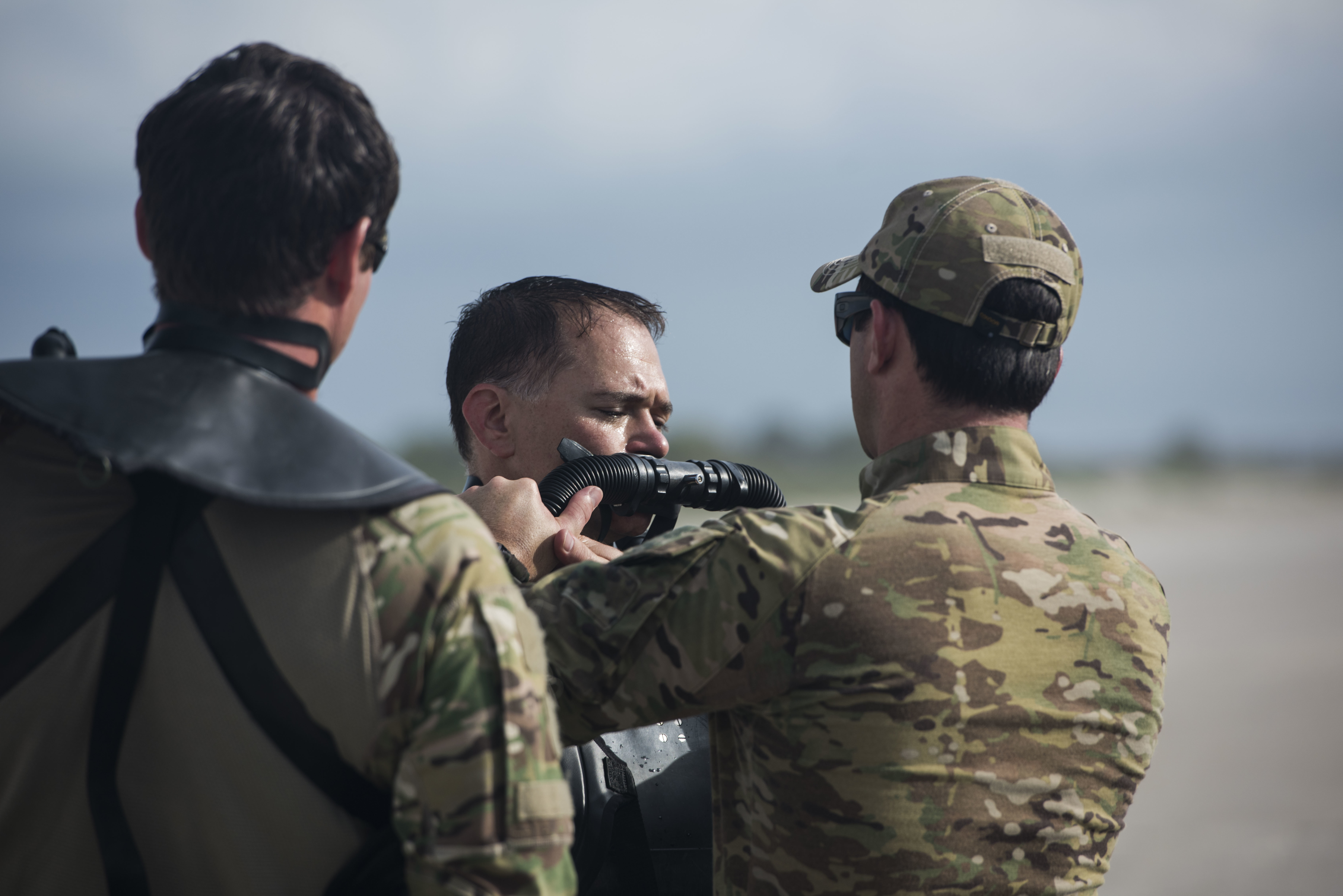
A member of the Army National Guard's 20th Special Forces Group (Airborne) combat dive team tests his rebreather apparatus prior to entering the water at Naval Station Mayport, Fla., April 29, 2015. The divers were performing closed circuit dive training required to complete their re-qualification.

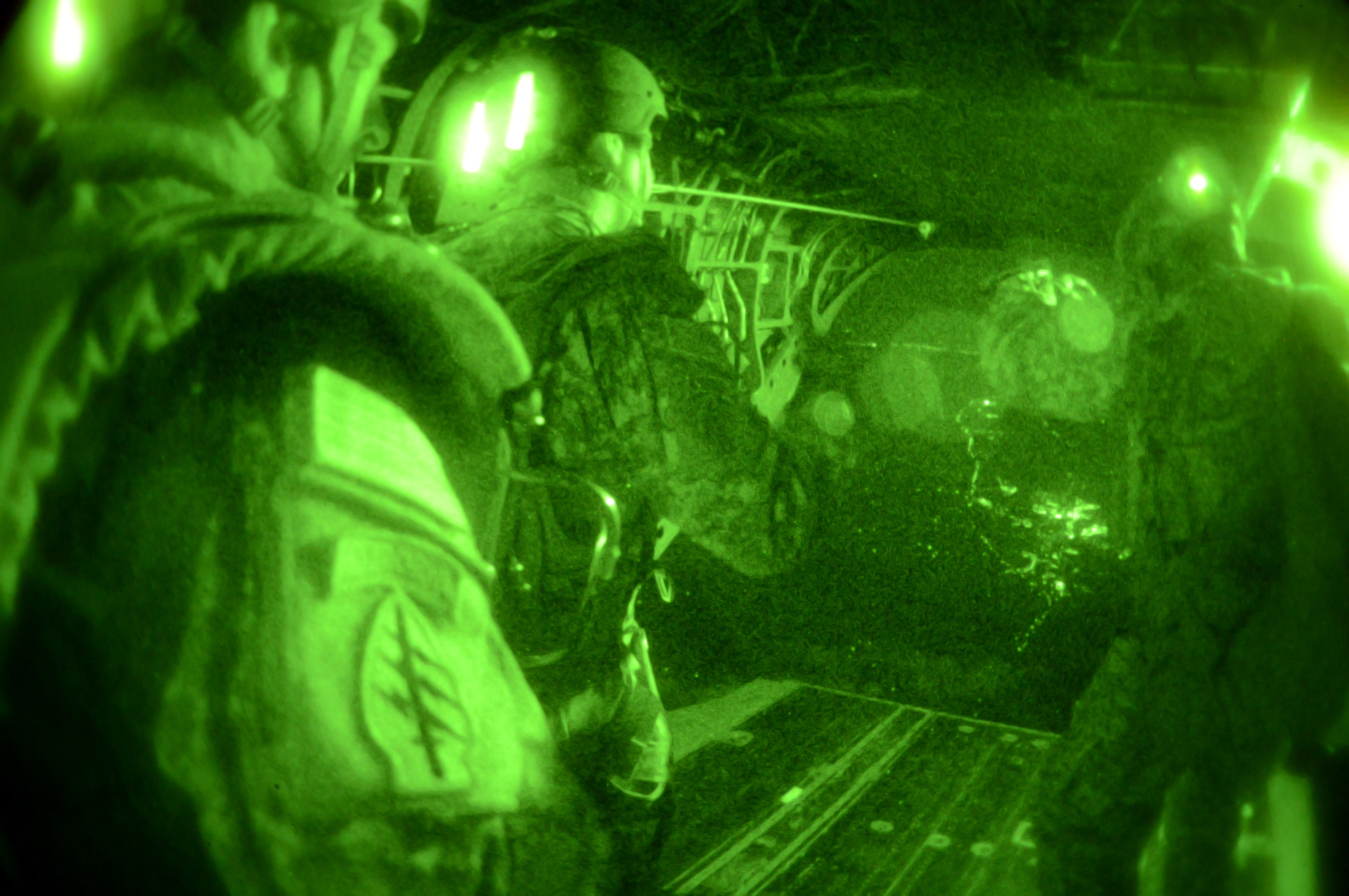
Special Forces Soldiers with the Illinois National Guard's Company A, 2nd Battalion, 20th Special Forces Group (Airborne) at that time of Chicago, prepare for a night high altitude high opening jump at 14,000 feet from a CH-47D Chinook with Company B, 2nd Battalion, 238th Aviation Regiment in Peoria, Illinois, at Fort McCoy, Wisconsin, August 8, 2014.

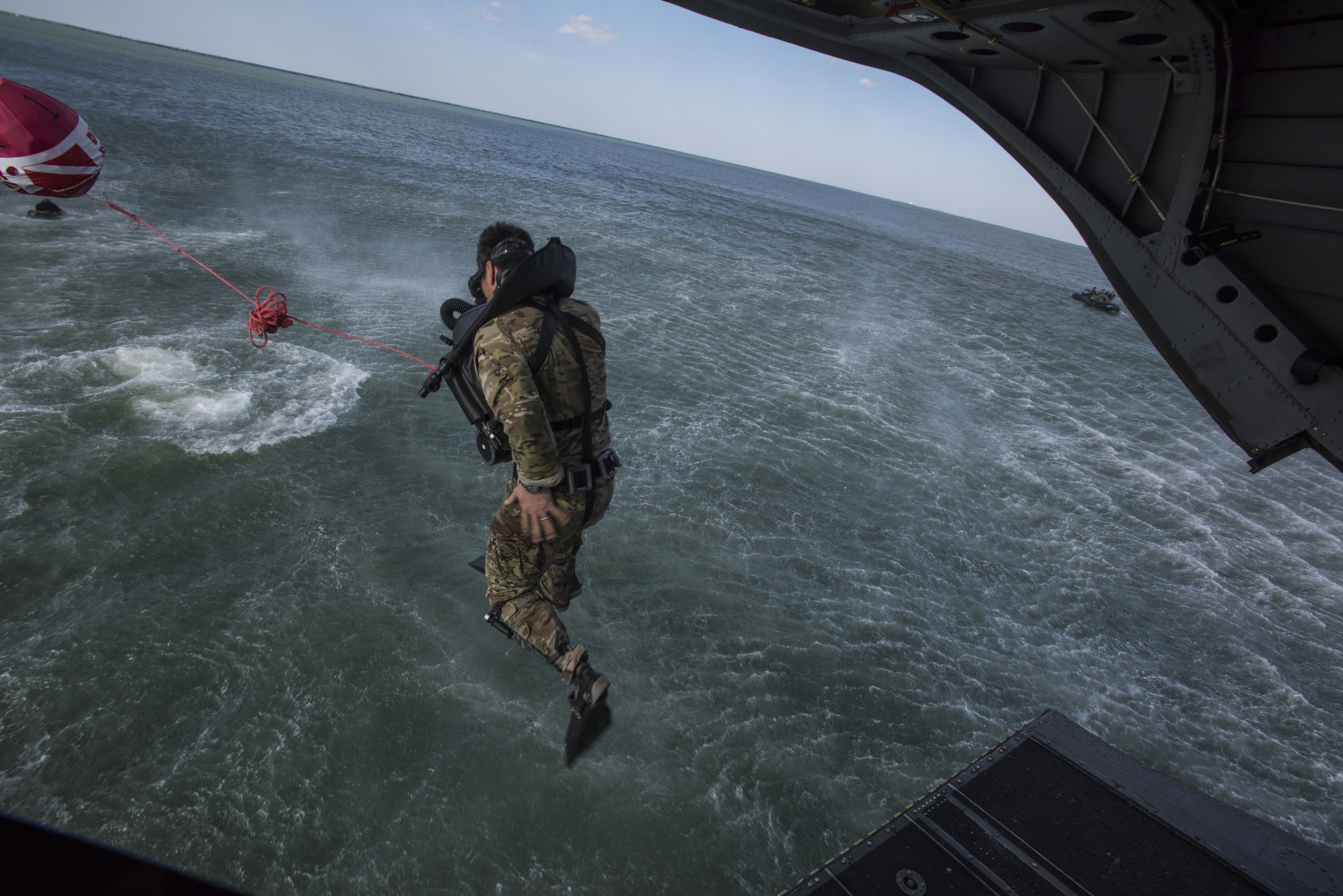
A member of the Army National Guard's 3rd Battalion, 20th Special Forces Group (Airborne) combat dive team helo-casts in Florida waters from a CH-47 Chinook helicopter at Naval Station Mayport, May 1, 2015. The divers were performing closed circuit dive training, help-casting and additional maritime training required to complete their re-qualification and familiarization.

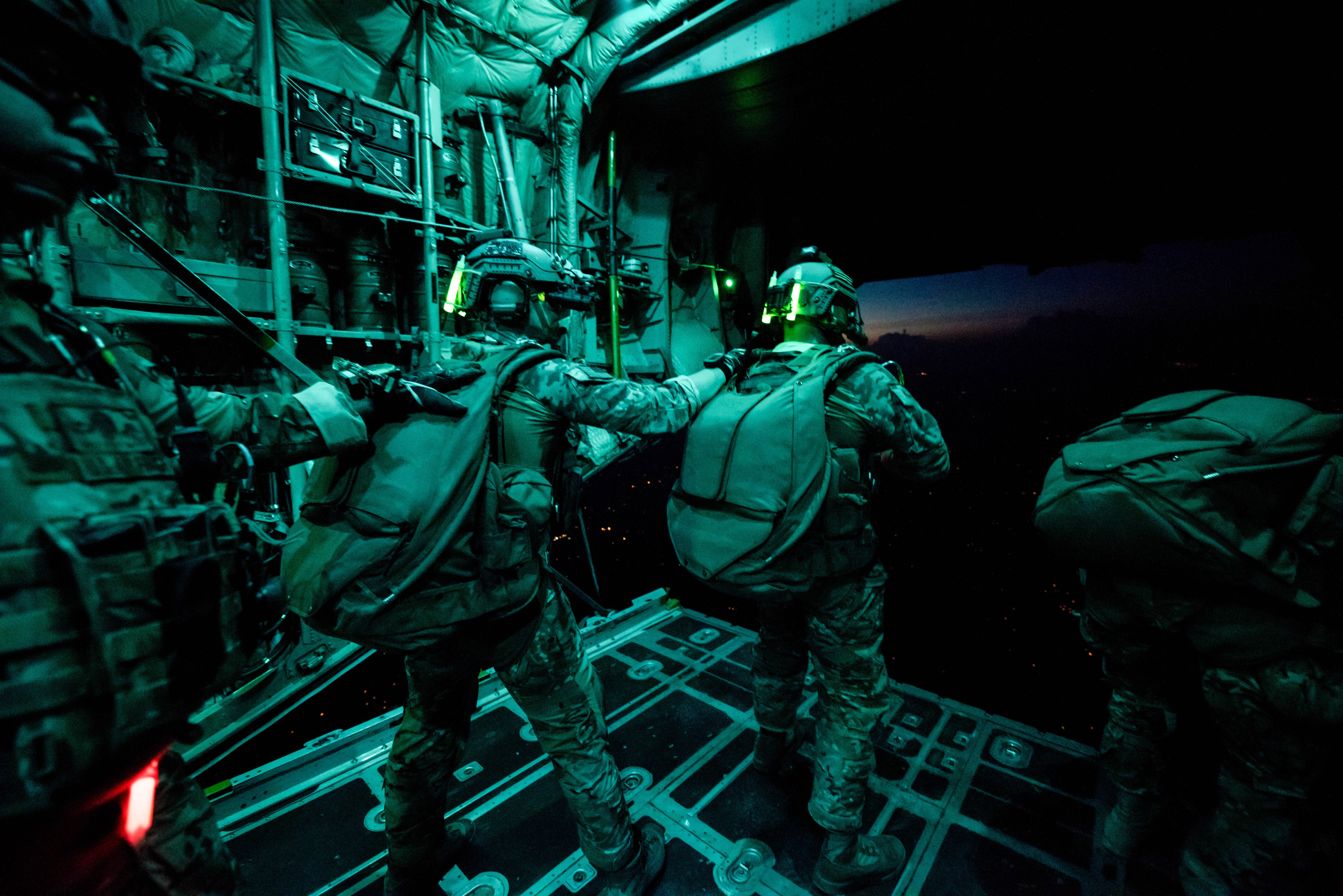
National Guardsmen with Company A, 2nd Battalion, 20th Special Forces Group (Airborne) prepare to exit a C-130 Hercules during a night training mission over Muscatatuck, Ind., Monday, Aug. 3, 2015.
