= 12th Special Forces Group =

12th Special Forces Group (Airborne)
- 12th Special Forces Group (Airborne) Beret Flash
- Active: 15 April 1960 – 15 September 1995
- Country: United States of America
- Branch: U.S. Army 1960–1969; U.S. Army Reserve 1969–1995
- Type: Special forces
- Role: Primary tasks: Unconventional warfare; Foreign internal defense; Special reconnaissance; Direct action; Hostage rescue; Counter-terrorism; Other roles: Counterproliferation; Information operations; Humanitarian missions
- Part of: 1st Special Forces Command (Airborne)
- Nicknames: Green Berets, Quiet Professionals, Soldier-Diplomats, Snake Eaters
- Mottos: De oppresso liber (U.S. Army's translation: "To Liberate the Oppressed")
- Engagements: Vietnam War; Operation Urgent Fury; Operation Just Cause; Gulf War

Insignia
- Former 12th Special Forces Group recognition bar, worn by non-special operations qualified soldiers—in lieu of a beret flash—from the 1960s to 1984

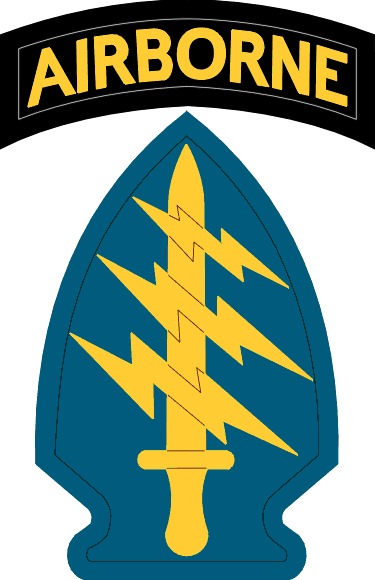
- 1st Special Forces Shoulder Sleeve Insignia, worn by all special forces units of the era

The 12th Special Forces Group (Airborne) [12th SFG(A)] traces its lineage from the 6th Company, 2nd Battalion, First Regiment, 1st Special Service Force, a joint Canadian-American special operations unit from World War II. The 12th Special Forces Group was reconstituted, but not activated, as a Regular Army special operations unit under the 1st Special Forces in 1960 and was subsequently allotted to the Army Reserve in 1969 where it remained until deactivation in 1995.

== History ==
Activated 9 July 1942 at Fort William Henry Harrison, Montana.

Disbanded 6 January 1945 in France.

Reconstituted 15 April 1960 in Regular Army; concurrently, consolidated with Company C, 2d Infantry Battalion and consolidated unit designated as Headquarters and Headquarters Company, 12th Special Forces Group, 1st Special Forces.

Withdrawn 14 December 1969 from the Regular Army and allotted to the Army Reserve (organic elements concurrently constituted).

Group activated 24 March 1961 with headquarters at Chicago, Illinois.

Location of headquarters changed 19 January 1964 to Oak Park, Illinois; changed 1 September 1970 to Arlington Heights, Illinois.

Elements Located at Richards-Gebaur AFB in Kansas City, Missouri in 1978–80, Northern California (Hamilton AFB), and San Diego, California (Van Deman Hall – USAR).

The Group was inactivated, along with the 11th Special Forces Group, on 15 September 1995.

Many members of the 12th SFG transferred to the Army National Guard's 20th SFG following the group's inactivation.
