= List of former United States special operations units =

Former United States special operations units are disbanded or otherwise dormant unconventional warfare units of the United States military. Most units were created to fulfill categorical obligations within a particular conflict, and were disbanded once that conflict ended. All branches of the United States Armed Forces – the Army, Navy, Marine Corps and Air Force have fielded special operations units. For subsisting special operations units, see United States special operations forces.

== The Civil War ==
- Jessie Scouts, Union Army scout unit that operated disguised as Confederate States Army soldiers

== World War II ==
- 1st Alaskan Combat Intelligence Platoon (Provisional) - "Castner's Cutthroats"
- 1st Special Service Force – "Devil's Brigade", a joint U.S.-Canadian unit
- 5307th Composite Unit (Provisional), GALAHAD Task Force – "Merrill's Marauders" – "Charles N. Hunter"
- 5332nd Brigade (Provisional) – MARS Task Force
- 475th Infantry Regiment (Long Range Penetration, Special)
- 124th Cavalry Regiment (Special) – "MARS Men", Texas Army National Guard – 1LT Jack L. Knight, the only WWII SOF Soldier Medal of Honor
- 612th Field Artillery Battalion (Pack)
- 613th Field Artillery Battalion (Pack)
- First American Volunteer Group, "Flying Tigers"
- Ranger Battalions
- Alamo Scouts
- Alaskan Scouts
- Marine Parachute Battalions – the "Paramarines"
- Marine Raider Battalions - the "Marine Raiders"
- United States Marine Corps Amphibious Reconnaissance Battalion, "VAC Amphib Recon Company" or "FMFPAC Amphib Recon Battalion"
- United States Marine Corps Scout (Tank) and Sniper Company – originated Scout Snipers and Division Recon
- Naval Scouts and Raiders
- Navy Combat Demolition Units (NCDU)
- US Navy Beach Jumpers
- Underwater Demolitions Teams (UDT) Precursor to the Navy SEALs
- 1st Air Commando Group
- Office of Strategic Services, whose functions included the arming, training and supplying of resistance movements; the use of propaganda, espionage, and subversion; and conducting post-war planning. Precursor to the CIA.

== Korean War ==
- Airborne Ranger Companies (Korean War)
- Air Resupply And Communications Service (ARCS)
- Combined Command Reconnaissance Activities, Korea (CCRAK)
- Joint Advisory Commission, Korea (JACK) (Korean War), CIA-affiliated covert special operations unit
- United Nations Partisan Infantry Korea (UNPIK)

== Vietnam War ==
- Fast Patrol Craft Patrol Craft Fast (PCF), also known as Swift Boats, were all-aluminum, 50-foot (15 m) long, shallow-draft vessels operated by the United States Navy for counterinsurgency (COIN) operations during the Vietnam War.
- Long Range Reconnaissance Patrols (LRRPs or "Lurps"); Vietnam War-era deep reconnaissance and raider units
- MIKE Force Mobile Strike Force Command; Corps I, II, III, IV
- Tiger Force (Vietnam War); reconnaissance commando (recondo) platoon in the 1/327th Infantry
- Project "Leaping Lena" (Vietnam War); Recondo course for South Vietnamese teams, trained by U.S. Special Forces, became Project DELTA.
- Project DELTA (Vietnam War); 5th Special Forces group long-range reconnaissance unit; precursor to MACV-SOG
- Military Assistance Command, Vietnam Studies and Observations Group (MACV-SOG), a joint covert Vietnam War-era task force composed of 2,000 American soldiers and over 8,000 indigenous mercenaries
- Project GAMMA/Project SIGMA MACV-SOG recon units that operated in Cambodia
- Project OMEGA Special Forces unit tasked to provide I Field Force Vietnam an SR capability in remote areas
- Project 404/Palace Dog was a USAF program that supplied support personnel in civilian clothing to the Royal Laotian Air Force. Long range goal was production of a self-sufficient RLAF.
- Raven FACs were USAF pilots in civilian clothing assigned to support the Royal Laotian Air Force by directing air strikes from small aircraft.

== Other ==
- 39th Special Forces Detachment (1952–1984), in Berlin, Germany, a classified unit that conducted unconventional warfare during the Cold War
- 69th Special Forces Group (1963–1971), 8th Special Forces Group (1963–1972), 11th Special Forces Group (1961–1994) and 12th Special Forces Group (1961–1994) (disbanded Army Special Forces Groups)
- "Blue light", a counter-terrorist unit created among the 5th Special Forces Group in the late 1970s
- Green Light Teams
- Special Operation - Reconnaissance, joint Marine-Navy reconnaissance units in the late 70s
- SEASPRAY, an aviation unit for military covert operations during the 1980s
- Red Cell, U.S. "Tiger team" active in the 1980s
- Marine Corps Special Operations Command Detachment One (MCSOCOM-Det 1) (Operation Iraqi Freedom), pilot project active from 19 June 2003 to 10 March 2006 to assess the establishment of a permanent U.S. Marine Corps unit under Special Operations Command (SOCOM); replaced by the United States Marine Corps Forces Special Operations Command (MARSOC)
- Observer Group
- Marine Corps Test Unit#1
- Asymmetric Warfare Group, a U.S. Army counterterrorism tactics development team active from 2006–2011

United States Marine Corps Scout Sniper U.S. Marine Corps reconnaissance unit disbanded in December 2023
