= Blue Light (unit) =

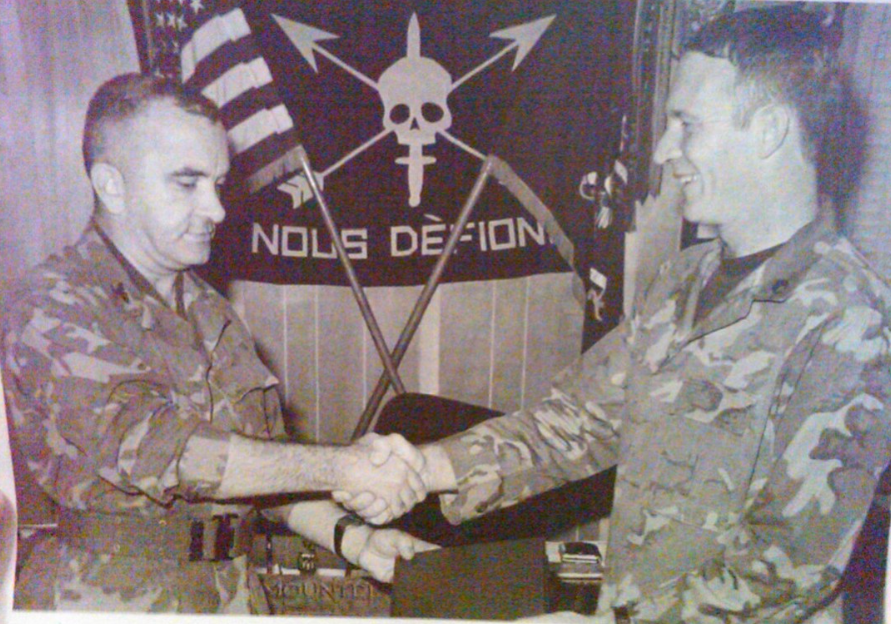
- Blue Light commander Col. Robert Anthony Mountel with unit member Greg Daily
- Active: November 1977 – August 1978
- Disbanded: August 1978
- Country: United States of America
- Branch: United States Army
- Type: Special forces
- Role: Counterterrorism, hostage rescue
- Part of: 5th Special Forces Group
- Garrison/HQ: Mott Lake, Fort Bragg, North Carolina
- Motto: "Nous Defions"

Commanders
- Notable commanders: Colonel Robert Anthony Mountel

Blue Light was a United States Army counter-terrorist subunit of the 5th Special Forces Group that existed in the late 1970s. It was founded in 1977 to fill the capabilities gap in counter-terrorism operations while Delta Force became operational.

It was the U.S. Army's first dedicated, permanent, counter-terrorism unit, and the predecessor to the Critical Threat Advisory Companies (CTAC) now found in every Special Forces Group. Drawn almost exclusively from Special Forces veterans of the Vietnam war, its mission set focusing on tubular assaults and hostage rescues ultimately overlapped with that of Delta Force and the unit was disbanded in 1978 when Delta Force became operational, with a small number of former Blue Light members successfully being selected for Delta.

Due to the unit's interim status and short tenure, it was never deployed for an actual hostage rescue.

== History and operations ==
=== Background ===
In the early 1970s, the U.S. Army lacked a dedicated counter-terrorism unit. (Note: Some units, such as Detachment A, had counter-terrorism missions in addition to their other responsibilities; but were not solely dedicated to that mission during this time period.) In 1976, following the success of the hostage rescue at Entebbe airport by Israel's special forces, the Pentagon made inquiries to General Jack Hennessey, commander of US Readiness Command (REDCOM), as to whether his forces could accomplish the same mission. According to Rod Lenahan, Hennessey replied that he had sufficient men but that they were not trained or equipped for such a mission. Reviewing a concepted, but never implemented plan from 1975 to address a wide range of terrorist threats, the Pentagon established two counter-terrorism contingency forces. JTF-7 would focus on the Middle East and Africa region, and JTF-11 would focus on Asia and the Pacific region.

In 1977, the task forces conducted a mock assault on a C-130 aircraft involving an entire Special Forces battalion (3rd Battalion, 5th Special Forces Group) parachuting in by static line, supported by an advanced force operation to from a 12-man team inserted by HALO jump. The exercises were part of the Army's annual Emergency Deployment Readiness Exercises (EDRE), this particular one under the auspices of the XVIII Airborne Corps. In March 1977, 3rd Battalion, 5th Special Forces Group commander LTC Rod Paschall was tasked with responding to domestic terrorist attacks including black militancy in the form of the then ongoing "Hanafi siege" in which armed gunmen from a Sunni orthodox splinter group of the Nation of Islam took over several buildings in the Washington D.C. area and held over 150 hostages.

The unit began conducting marksmanship and helicopter rappel training in preparation for inserting onto the roofs of the buildings held by Khalifaa Hamaas Abdul Khaalis and his followers. However, due to the intervention of ambassadors Ashraf Ghorbal of Egypt, Ardeshir Zahedi of Iran, and Sahabzada Yaqubkhan of Pakistan, the Hanafi forces surrendered before 5th Group was able to be deployed from Fort Bragg, North Carolina. In Fall 1977, the battalion participated in another counter-terrorism focused EDRE called "End Game", in which the Special Forces alert force and elements of 1st Ranger Battalion conducted a mock boarding of President Carter's Boeing 707, with the SF team penetrating the cockpit through an ingress technique that even the pilots of the plane did not know existed. (Note: As Carter was not on board, the aircraft was technically not called "Air Force One" at the time.)

=== Formation ===
Following the successful rescue by the West German counterterrorism unit GSG-9 of 70 hostages from a Lufthansa airliner in Somalia hijacked by the PLO, it became clear that the U.S. could not perform the same mission. Charles Beckwith had originally pitched the Department of Defense on establishing a permanent unit modeled after the British Special Air Service in the 1960s, focused around conducting POW rescues similar to the Son Tay raid, but had met with steadfast resistance until the aforementioned terrorist incidents of the 1970s.

Beckwith, and others in Special Forces, had believed that the preparations for the Son Tay raid, and the lessons learned therefrom could be used as a model for the tactics, techniques and procedures needed for a standing counter-terrorism unit. Due to the post-Vietnam drawdown of forces, only 5th Special Forces Group was capable of sourcing the manpower for such a unit. Following the GSG-9 Somalia rescue operation, Beckwith was given the approval to activate what would become Special Forces Operational Detachment-Delta, or Delta Force; however, Beckwith had estimated it would take 24 months to assemble the required troops and funding. General Hennessey had made it explicitly clear to Beckwith that he required a force capable of surgical precision conducting urban hostage barricade and aircraft recovery immediately, and that he would expect Beckwith to respond to any actual incidents if called regardless of whether the force was fully stood up. The responsibility for this interim force was given to General Jack Mackmull, who assigned 5th Group commander Colonel Robert Anthony Mountel to establish the unit which would become known as Blue Light. Mountel immediately began recruiting candidates from a core group of enlisted Vietnam veterans, at least 10% of whom had served on the Son Tay raid.

Mountel's preference for Son Tay veterans was so strong that in order to convince Son Tay veteran Master Sergeant Jake Jakovenko to join Blue Light, Mountel agreed to take Jakovenko's entire ODA with him to the unit as well. According to Blue Light member Thomas "Taffy" Carlin, half of the initial group had been assigned to Green Light teams. The rest were all Vietnam veterans of other highly classified Vietnam assignments including Project Omega, Project DELTA (which Beckwith had commanded), Project SIGMA, and MIKE Force; being later made up of Green Berets from the 5th Special Forces Group's 2nd Battalion.

=== Conflict with Delta Force ===
By the time Blue Light had stood up and become operational, Delta was beginning to be formed. According to Delta Force Sergeant Major Mike Vining, the unit's unclassified mission at the time was, like Blue Light's, also to serve as a standing force that could do the Son Tay style mission. As Delta Force had been modeled after the British SAS, while Blue Light was not, Delta Force had the advantage of interfacing with the SAS on their practical experience dealing with terrorism in Northern Ireland. Both Delta Force and Blue Light were training to develop expertise in taking down tubular targets (like tunnels, busses, or planes), with or without barricaded hostages. Both units trained to operate in permissive and non-permissive environments. Both units cross-trained with GSG-9, in part due to the Special Forces community's longstanding friendship with their commander, Colonel Ulrich "Ricky" Wegener. However, while Delta was still conducting its initial selection and training, Blue Light was fully ready to conduct worldwide operations.

According to Murphy, it is unlikely that Blue Light and Delta were ever actually in competition with each other for the job of the Army's permanent counter-terrorism force, as Blue Light was always intended to be an interim unit. However, he notes that this myth may derive from when Delta was at one point brought Blue Light's range during their validation practice, and each tested on the same range within the same month, perhaps to determine a common set of standards from a largely homogenous group of Special Forces soldiers neatly divided into two cohorts. During this time, Beckwith was unable to get sufficient numbers of operators to complete his Operators Training Course assessment and selection process, due to the Ranger Battalions not allowing their men to attend. As a result, Beckwith developed a deep animosity towards General Mackmull, whom he believed preferred Blue Light over Delta; as well as with Mountel whom he'd viewed as a rival. Nevertheless, Delta went on to complete its initial certification exercise in July 1978, and Blue Light was deemed redundant and slated to be deactivated shortly thereafter.

Blue Light members were asked to try out for Delta, though due to the reported animosity only fifty attended. Due to the close-knit nature of the Special Forces community in Vietnam, many of the Blue Light members held a grudge against Beckwith, who they nicknamed derisively "Chargin' Charlie" for his aggressive personality, accusing him of taking unnecessary casualties taken during Project Delta operations in the Lao Valley (in which Beckwith himself was shot and seriously wounded by a .51 caliber machine gun round). A particular sticking point was Beckwith's insistence that all Blue Light members undergo Delta's selection and assessment process. The Blue Light soldiers felt that this was unnecessary, as Beckwith was already familiar with their experiences, knowing nearly all of them personally from combat in Vietnam. Beckwith also refused to allow Blue Light's female intelligence specialist to assess, though her experience in Blue Light would ultimately prompt Delta Force to include a specialized cell including a half-dozen female soldiers by the 1990s. At least four successfully passed Delta selection and training. Blue Light was deactivated in August, 1978.

=== Legacy ===
In addition to Delta Force, Blue Light would go on to serve as the blueprint for other Army counter-terrorism units. The capability of rapid counter-terrorist response became known as "in-extremis force", a mission set that would be picked up by Detachment A of 10th Special Forces Group, and later Charlie Company 3rd Battalion, 7th Special Forces Group.

Since 1999, each Special Forces Group has a company tasked with the direct action mission -- at various times called the Commander's In-extremis Force (CIF) and the Critical Threat Advisory Company (CTAC) -- with counterterrorism responsibilities.

== Origin of name ==
According to historian Jack Murphy, "Blue Light" was the non-classified name for the unit, which was actually under a classified project that "no one ever actually used", a naming convention used by Green Light as well.

Founding member Gary O'Neal postulated in his book, American Warrior, that Robert Anthony Mountel used the name because it was the name of an undercover OSS mission in France during World War II.

== Organization and capabilities ==
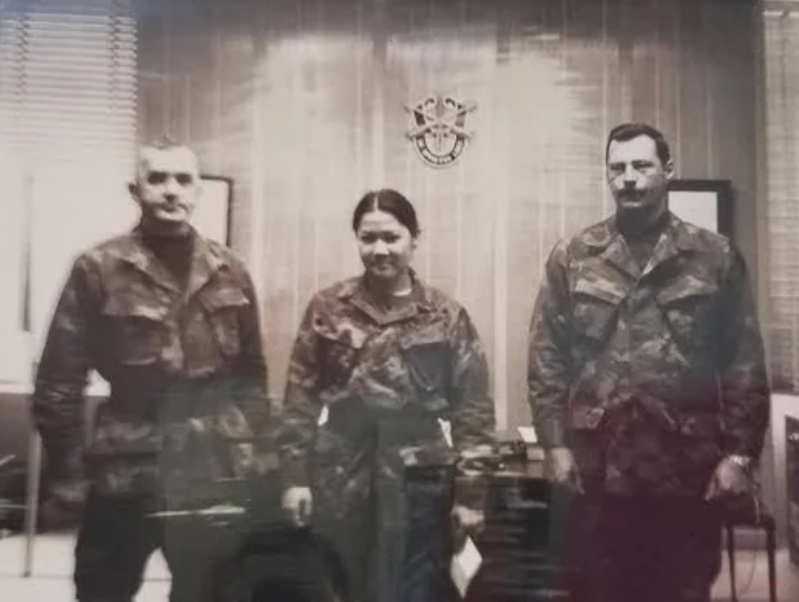
Blue Light members Col. Robert Anthony Mountel (L), Spc. Katie McBrayer (Center), Col. Tom Carlin (R)

Blue Light's original founding consisted of about 75 operators, organized into two assault teams structured around the familiar 12-man Special Forces ODA arrangement, and a third assault team consisting of a 24-man element that was additionally tasked with intelligence collection, plus a sniper/observer team, a HUMINT support team from the 801st MID, and a SIGINT support team from the 400th Special Operations Detachment. The detachment from the 801st was commanded by Blue Light's S-2 (intelligence officer), Captain Timothy J. Casey, who was later one of the intelligence officers assigned to JTF 1–79 which commanded the ill-fated Operation Eagle Claw.

The standard counter-terrorism EDRE called for a Ranger battalion to static-line jump in several miles from the target and infiltrate on foot to quietly cordon off the target, followed by a Blue Light HALO free fall insertion inside that perimeter. In one EDRE using this format located in Nevada, Blue Light conducted the first nighttime mass-tactical HALO jump, involving 25 jumpers. All 25 jumpers landed within the perimeter established by 2nd Ranger Battalion, 75th Ranger Regiment.

Blue Light pioneered a number of advancements in training and tactical shooting that are now commonplace. Blue Light was the first to utilize the pistol as a primary offensive weapon, issuing the M1911 for assaulters climbing on aircraft wings and conducting tubular assaults -- both the preference for custom M1911s and the tubular assault expertise would later become hallmarks of Delta Force. Operators attended training from civilian expert instructors, such as Jeff Cooper's Gunsite Academy. Operators practiced shooting under stress, including after long runs and HALO insertions. Shoot house training took place in warehouses, buildings, cruise ships and a "Hogan's Alley"-style urban environment. The cruise ship mission eventually became so important that Blue Light stood up a maritime section specifically focused on just these capabilities, which recruited from master divers who had served in Vietnam (mostly in MACV-SOG) familiar with multiple languages. The maritime section developed a new technique for stealthily boarding a hostile cruise ship via using sticky pads that would allow them to crawl up the ship's garbage chute. Blue Light conducted live-fire demonstrations for VIPs, including directors of the FBI and CIA; at one point two snipers located three hundred yards down range shot balloons located four inches away from Army Chief of Staff General Bernard W. Rogers' head.

The unit recruited a female soldier named Katie McBrayer (Note: referred to in some sources by her married name, Katie Bradford.) from 5th Group's intelligence support element, where she had served as a 96B intelligence analyst with the rank of E-4 Specialist. McBrayer was trained to dress as a civilian nurse or flight attendant to infiltrate a hostage aircraft and gather intelligence. She was trained on the M1911, and became HALO qualified. (Note: In an interview with Murphy, a former Blue Light Sergeant Major stated "She was HALO qualified, she could out shoot the men;" however from the same source, McBrayer states that she was dropped from the course, due to minor infractions as a pretext stating "I was told later on after I got out that 'you were not supposed to pass, you were not supposed to make it.") When the unit was being disbanded, McBrayer was not allowed to assess for Delta with the rest of Blue Light; she was offered an administrative position as Mountel's driver, but left the military instead.

=== Facilities ===
Blue Light was headquartered at Mott Lake in a compound formerly used as 7th Special Forces Group's isolation facility. Some experienced SOF officers visited Mott Lake from overseas to provide assistance and advice.

=== Equipment ===
Blue Light was equipped with a variety of small arms, including suppressed Sten submachineguns, CAR-15 carbines, M14 rifles, Remington M700 bolt action sniper rifles, and several pistols including M1911s, .22 caliber pistols for subsonic shooting, and 25mm bb guns for shoothouse training. Blue Light also preferred the usage of civilian match-grade ammunition, at one point securing the Army's entire annual stockpile. When parachuting, Blue Light preferred MC-3 parachutes, and used tennis shoes instead of boots when jumping to reduce noise while climbing on airplane wings.

== Insignia legacy ==
Blue Light member Greg Daily was the originator of the "Nous Defions" symbol and motto widely used throughout Special Forces. Daily also designed the HALO parachutist wings.

== See also ==
- Detachment A
