= Helicopter Rope Suspension Technique =

Method of military insertion or extraction

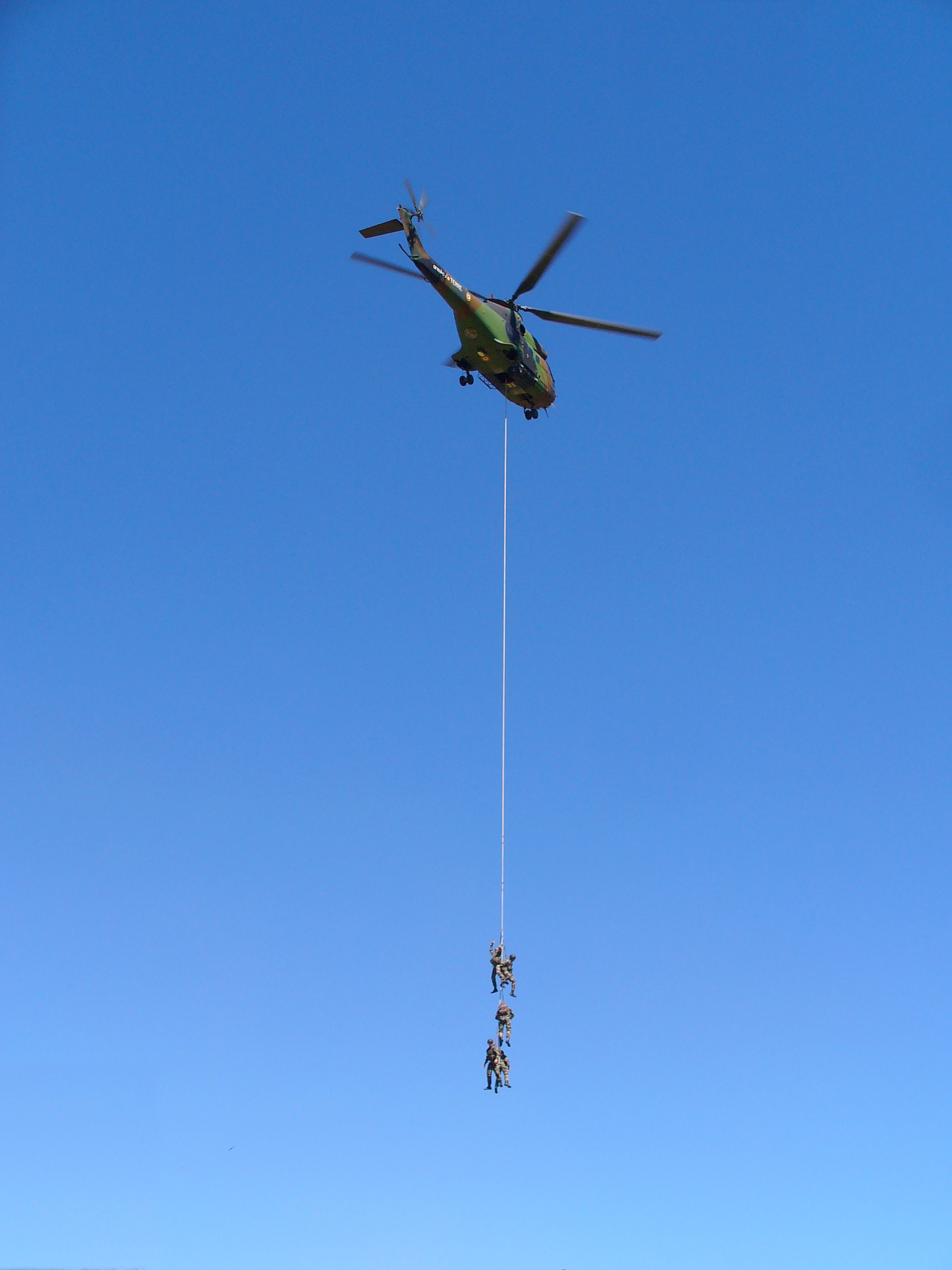
Soldiers suspended beneath a Puma helicopter

Helicopter Rope Suspension Technique (HRST) is a military term for techniques and methods of rappelling, fast roping, Special Patrol Insertion/Extraction (SPIE) and Jacob's Ladder operations. Helicopter Rope Suspension was developed as a means to insert and/or extract, by helicopter, ground forces (primarily reconnaissance teams) into or from rough terrain, urban areas or water. HRST is designed to be used in situations wherein aircraft landings are impractical due to terrain or tactical situation.

== See also ==
- Fulton surface-to-air recovery system
- STABO vest
