= Colonel Kurtz =

Fictional character in Apocalypse Now

Walter E. Kurtz
- Marlon Brando as Colonel Kurtz in Apocalypse Now
- First appearance: Apocalypse Now (1979)
- Created by: John Milius; Francis Ford Coppola
- Based on: Kurtz from Heart of Darkness
- Portrayed by: Marlon Brando

In-universe information
- Aliases: Kurtz; Mr. Kurtz; God
- Gender: Male
- Occupation: Rogue military colonel; Cult leader
- Spouse: Janet Kurtz
- Children: Unnamed son
- Nationality: American

Colonel Walter E. Kurtz, portrayed by Marlon Brando, is a fictional character and the main antagonist of Francis Ford Coppola's epic war film Apocalypse Now (1979). Colonel Kurtz is based on the character of a nineteenth-century ivory trader, also called Kurtz, from the 1899 novella Heart of Darkness by Joseph Conrad.

== Fictional biography ==
Walter Kurtz was a career officer in the United States Army; he was a third-generation West Point graduate who had risen through the ranks and was seen to be destined for a top post within the Pentagon. A dossier read by the narrator, Captain Willard, implies that Kurtz saw action in the Korean War after receiving a master's degree in history from Harvard University. He later graduated from the US Army Airborne School.

In 1964, the Joint Chiefs of Staff sent Kurtz to Vietnam to compile a report on the failings of the current military policies. His overtly critical report, dated March 3, 1964, was not what was expected and was immediately restricted for the Joint Chiefs and President Lyndon B. Johnson only.

On May 11, August 28, and September 23, 1964, 38-year-old Kurtz applied for Special Forces, which was denied out of hand because his age was too advanced for Special Forces training. Kurtz continued with his ambition and even threatened to quit the armed forces, when finally his wish was granted and he was allowed to take the airborne course. Kurtz graduated in a class where he was nearly twice the age of the other trainees and was accepted into the Special Forces Training, and eventually into the 5th Special Forces Group.

Kurtz returned to Vietnam in 1966 with the Green Berets and was part of the hearts and minds campaign, which also included fortifying hamlets. On his next tour, Kurtz was assigned to Project GAMMA, in which he was to raise an army of Montagnards in and around the Vietnamese–Cambodian border to strike at the Viet Cong (VC) and North Vietnamese Army (NVA). Kurtz located his army, including their wives and children, at a remote abandoned Cambodian temple which Kurtz's team fortified. From their base, Kurtz led attacks on the local VC and the regular NVA in the region.

Kurtz employed barbaric methods not only to defeat his enemy but also to send fear. At first Military Assistance Command, Vietnam (MACV) did not object to Kurtz's tactics, especially as they proved successful. This soon changed when Kurtz allowed photographs of his atrocities to be released to the world.

In late 1967, after Kurtz failed to respond to MACV's repeated orders to return to Da Nang and resign his command after he ordered the summary execution of four South Vietnamese intelligence agents whom he suspected of being double agents for the Viet Cong, the MACV sent a Green Beret Captain named Richard Colby to bring Kurtz back from Cambodia. Instead Colby gave up everything and joined Kurtz's force.

With Colby's failure, MACV then selected Captain Benjamin L. Willard, a paratrooper and Army intelligence officer, to journey up the Nung river and kill Kurtz. Willard succeeded in his mission only because Kurtz, himself broken mentally by the savage war he had waged, wanted Willard to kill him and release him from his own suffering. Kurtz also murdered Jay "Chef" Hicks by severing his head. Before Willard killed him, Kurtz asked Willard to find Kurtz's wife and son, and explain truthfully to them what he had done in the war.

== Personality ==
Well, you see, Willard, in this war, things get confused out there: power, ideals, the old morality, practical military necessity. But out there with these natives, it must be a temptation to be god, because there's a conflict in every human heart, between the rational and the irrational, between good and evil, and good does not always triumph. Sometimes, the dark side overcomes what Lincoln called the better angels of our nature. Every man has got a breaking point. You and I have one. Walter Kurtz has reached his, and very obviously, he has gone insane...

— Lt. Gen. Corman describing Kurtz to Willard, Apocalypse Now (1979)

Ever since he was in the US Army, Kurtz was always a patriotic soldier for his nation, thinking on how to achieve victory in the Vietnam War by any kind of means. Seemingly a kindhearted man, Kurtz eventually reached his "breaking point" according to Gen. Corman's words. This point led him to betray the US Army following his dismissal, yet, he was a career soldier, fully serving his nation in any means. However, his breaking point led him to become a bitter, psychotic, sinister and manipulative individual, aiming to use his "unsound" methods to make sure his nation would win the war, even though he was using those methods to brutally torture Vietnamese people, nearly to death, yet, he was not a sadist but a confident individual, using his boldness to ensure USA's triumph. General Corman describes Kurtz to have originally been a good man, the kind of person who is filled with rational thought including the capability of seeing the difference between good and evil.

Often ruthless, Kurtz has an extremely complex personality, to the point of being unpredictable. When he rose to power as the "God-King" of the Montagnards, Kurtz was treated like a Deity, using his extensive military training to form an army of followers and soldiers around him, eventually becoming a philosopher of war, reading poetry and quotes from the Holy Bible, leading him to be seen as truly insane.

The photojournalist "Jack" is the first American to meet Kurtz after his transformation into a crazed megalomaniac, yet he describes him as a great man, and, as a man who reads poetry "out loud". His ruthless nature can be seen in photos presented to Willard, in which Kurtz had used his own men to kill or torture Vietnamese people, however, his truly ruthless nature comes to light when he tortures Willard physically by capturing him at a bamboo-like prison booth, as well as mentally by showing him the severed head of his friend Chef, whom he had killed.

== Inspiration ==
Colonel Kurtz is based on the character of a 19th-century ivory trader, also called Kurtz, from the novella Heart of Darkness (1899) by Joseph Conrad.

The movie's Kurtz is widely believed to have been modeled after Tony Poe, a highly decorated and highly unorthodox Vietnam War-era paramilitary officer from the CIA's Special Activities Division. Poe was known to drop severed heads into enemy-controlled villages as a form of psychological warfare and to use human ears to record the number of enemies his indigenous troops had killed. He would send these ears back to his superiors as proof of his efforts deep inside Laos.

However, Coppola denies that Poe was a primary influence. He maintains the character was loosely based on Special Forces Colonel Robert B. Rheault, whose 1969 arrest for the murder of a suspected double agent generated substantial news coverage.

== Portrayal ==
By early 1976, Francis Ford Coppola had persuaded Marlon Brando to play Colonel Walter E. Kurtz in Apocalypse Now (1979), for a fee of $2 million for a month's work on location in September 1976. Brando also received 10% of the gross theatrical rental and 10% of the TV sale rights, earning him around $9 million.

When Brando arrived for filming in the Philippines in September 1976, he was dissatisfied with the script; Brando didn't understand why Kurtz was meant to be very thin and bald, or why the character's name was Kurtz and not something like Leighley. He claimed, "American generals don't have those kinds of names. They have flowery names, from the South. I want to be 'Colonel Leighley'." And so, for a time the name was changed under his demand.

When Brando showed up for filming he had put on about 40 pounds (18 kg) and forced Coppola to shoot him above the waist, making it appear that Kurtz was a 6-foot 6-inch (198 cm) giant. Many of Brando's speeches were ad-libbed, with Coppola filming hours of footage of these monologues and then cutting them down to the most interesting parts.

Filming was put on a week-long hiatus so that Brando and Coppola could resolve their creative disputes. It is claimed that someone left Joseph Conrad's source text from Heart of Darkness (1899), which Coppola had repeatedly referred to Brando but which Brando had never read, in the houseboat where Brando was staying at the time. Brando returned to filming with his head shaved, wanting to be "Kurtz" once again; claiming it was all clear to him now that he had read Conrad's novella.

Still photographs of Brando in character as Major Penderton, in the film Reflections in a Golden Eye (1967), were used later by the producers of Apocalypse Now, who needed photos of a younger Brando to appear in the service record of the younger Colonel Walter Kurtz.

== As inspiration source ==
- Stephen King's novel Dreamcatcher (2001) features an antagonist by the name of Abraham Kurtz who is clearly based on Brando's performance. The character is portrayed by Morgan Freeman in the 2003 film adaptation.
- One of the inspirations Iron Man 3 (2013) director Shane Black had for Trevor Slattery, his version of the Mandarin portrayed by Ben Kingsley, was Brando's Kurtz.
- The 2012 Teenage Mutant Ninja Turtles animated series featured their depiction of the Punk Frog leader Attila, who is based on Kurtz in terms of personality and mannerisms of Brando's performance. The character was voiced by veteran voice actor Maurice LaMarche.
- Josh Brolin based his portrayal of the villain Thanos in the Marvel Cinematic Universe (MCU) on Brando's portrayal as Kurtz.
- The character's appearance partially inspired that of Luke Skywalker in the Star Wars film Star Wars: The Last Jedi (2017), the second installment of the Star Wars sequel trilogy.
- Stellan Skarsgård's portrayal of Vladimir Harkonnen in Dune (2021) was inspired by Brando's performance and the impression the character makes. Director Denis Villeneuve brought the idea of inspiring the Baron on Kurtz to have more gravitas than his stereotypical portrayal in Frank Herbert's original Dune (1965) novel.
- In World Wrestling Entertainment, The "Tribal Chief" storyline, involving Universal Champion Roman Reigns as its leader, is – according to on-screen manager Paul Heyman – based on Apocalypse Now and Kurtz.
- In CD Projekt RED's Cyberpunk 2077: Phantom Liberty, Colonel Kurt Hansen—the primary antagonist—is heavily based on Kurtz and is even tagged as Kurtz in the game's internal files.
- Yager Development's 2012 video game Spec Ops: The Line is heavily inspired by Heart of Darkness and Apocalypse Now. The game's antagonist, Lieutenant Colonel John Konrad, is based on Colonel Kurtz.
- The antagonist of the 2017 film War for the Planet of the Apes, Colonel J. Wesley McCullough (billed simply as "The Colonel" and portrayed by Woody Harrelson), is partly inspired by Colonel Kurtz.
