= Robert Rheault =

United States Army colonel (1925–2013)

Robert Bradley Rheault
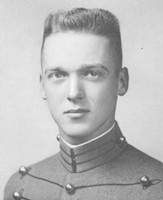
- Robert B. Rheault in 1946 at the U.S. Military Academy
- Born: October 31, 1925; Boston, Massachusetts, U.S.
- Died: October 16, 2013 (aged 87); Owls Head, Maine, U.S.
- Military career
- Allegiance: United States of America
- Branch: United States Army
- Service years: 1946–1969
- Rank: Colonel
- Units: Infantry Branch; U.S. Army Special Forces
- Commands: First Special Forces Group; Fifth Special Forces Group
- Conflicts: Korean War; Vietnam War
- Awards: Silver Star
- Other work: Educator Outward Bound Program

Robert Bradley Rheault /roʊ/ (October 31, 1925 – October 16, 2013) was an American soldier in the U.S. Army Special Forces who served as commander of the First Special Forces Group in Okinawa, and the Fifth Special Forces Group in Vietnam from May to July 1969.

Rheault was best known for his role as a co-conspirator and commander of the unit responsible for the 20 June 1969 execution of South Vietnam double agent Thai Khac Chuyen, who compromised intelligence agents involved in Project GAMMA operating in Vietnam and Cambodia.

== Early life and education ==
Robert Rheault was born October 31, 1925, to Charles Auguste and Rosamond (née Bradley) Rheault in Westwood, a suburb of Boston. Prior to immigrating to the United States in 1924, his father had served with the Royal Canadian Mounted Police and was stationed in Labrador where he met Rosamond Bradley, from a prominent Boston family, who had been working at the Grenfell Medical Mission.

Rheault spoke French from an early age and attended Phillips Exeter Academy, from which he graduated in 1943. He graduated in 1946 from the United States Military Academy at West Point, New York. He also completed graduate work at the University of Paris and received a master's degree in international relations from George Washington University.

== Military service and post-military career ==
Rheault was awarded the Silver Star for his actions in combat in the Korean War, attaining the rank of captain. After Korea, Rheault taught French at the U.S. Military Academy for several years in the mid-1950s, attaining the rank of major. He attended the Special Forces Qualification course, the Q-Course, in 1961, and his initial Special Forces assignment was with the 10th Special Forces Group in Germany.

He would later command the 1st Special Forces Group on Okinawa before being assigned to Vietnam to take command of the 5th Special Forces Group. Colleagues said of Rheault that he was one of the most respected and beloved officers ever in Special Forces, a "must promote" to general officer rank if his command, and career, had not been ended prematurely by the Green Beret Affair.

Life Magazine cover from November 14, 1969 with Robert Rheault shortly after resolution of the "Green Beret Affair"

All U.S. Army Special Forces in 1969 operated under the control of 5th Special Forces Group, headquartered at Nha Trang on the southeast coast of South Vietnam. There was a close relationship with the CIA that complicated the chain of command and philosophy of rules of engagement.

Colonel Rheault took command of the 5th in May 1969 and his unit was charged with seeking out leaks in a CIA-directed espionage ring as part of Project GAMMA. Rheault, along with six of his Special Forces officers and a sergeant were arrested by the U.S. military under the orders of General Creighton Abrams and threatened with charges of murder and conspiracy to commit murder, arising from the alleged extrajudicial killing of Thai Khac Chuyen, a Vietnamese double agent for the Americans and the North Vietnamese.

The investigation and court-martial, held by the U.S. Army in Vietnam, rapidly became engulfed in a firestorm of media publicity. Most of the American public and the Special Forces believed that Colonel Rheault and all involved had been made scapegoats for a matter that reflected poorly upon the Army. The view that there was no wrongdoing by the soldiers was probably best stated by Rheault's 11-year-old son, Robert, Jr. who upon learning of his father's arrest said, "What is all the fuss about? I thought that was what dad was in Vietnam for ... to kill Viet Cong".

However, the prosecution provided testimony showing that Chuyen was shot by Rheault's officers and his body dumped into the South China Sea. Further, they argued that Rheault was most certainly aware of the provisions of the Third Geneva Convention on the treatment of prisoners of war and Article 118 of the Uniform Code of Military Justice. He approved the execution of Chuyen, and also approved the cover story that Chuyen was lost on an undercover mission designed to prove his loyalty to South Vietnam and the United States.

Judge Advocate General Captain John Stevens Berry called General Abrams and CIA officials to the witness stand, but both declined to testify. In September 1969 the Secretary of the Army Stanley Resor announced that all charges would be dropped against the soldiers since the CIA, in the interests of national security, had refused to make its personnel available as witnesses. On October 31, 1969, upon ascertaining that further military commands and promotions were not likely, Colonel Rheault requested immediate retirement from the Army. All others charged in the affair also had their careers effectively ended and left the service soon afterwards. The U.S. government later paid the widow of the Vietnamese agent a small pension, quelling her protests outside the American Embassy in Saigon. If there had been a trial, defense lawyer F. Lee Bailey said later, "the defendants would have become Abrams, (CIA Director Richard) Helms and Nixon. The only winner would have been North Vietnam."

After the war, Francis Ford Coppola, director of the 1979 film Apocalypse Now said that the character Colonel Walter Kurtz in the film was loosely based upon Rheault, of whom he had become aware through the 1969 news accounts of the Green Beret Affair.

Upon retirement from the military, Rheault served as an instructor, program leader, and later, acting president of the Hurricane Island Outward Bound School in Rockland, Maine; retiring from the school in 2001 after 32 years of service. He also taught at the Northfield Mount Hermon School in Massachusetts. Rheault served on the board of directors of The Apprenticeshop, a traditional boat building and maritime school in Rockland, as well as on the board of directors of The Warrior Connection, a 501(c)(3) organization dedicated to the rehabilitation of military veterans suffering from posttraumatic stress disorder (PTSD).

== Family life ==
In 1947 Rheault married Caroline Young (1927–2006), a Vassar College student from New York, and they had three children. Rheault resided in Owls Head, Maine, with his second wife, Susan St. John, married in 1977, and the couple adopted two children.

== Death ==
Rheault died on October 16, 2013, at his home in Owls Head, Maine.

Rheault was interviewed for Ken Burns and Lynn Novick's PBS documentary series, The Vietnam War, which aired in September 2017, four years after his death.
