= Project DELTA =

US Reconnaissance Project formed during the Vietnam War

Project DELTA was the first of the Reconnaissance Projects, which were special reconnaissance (SR) units named with a Greek letter. The Reconnaissance Projects were originally formed by the U.S. Mission as Project Leaping Lena and one month later transferred to Military Assistance Command, Vietnam (MACV) during the Vietnam War to collect operational intelligence in remote areas of South Vietnam.

Project DELTA was established at Nha Trang in 1964 and consisted of six reconnaissance hunter-killer teams each composed of four United States Special Forces (USSF) and six Army of the Republic of Vietnam Special Forces (LLDB) and later supported by the 91st Ranger Battalion (later redesignated the 81st Ranger Battalion). It was designated Detachment B-52, 5th Special Forces Group.

== Mission ==
DELTA's mission included operational and strategic reconnaissance into long-held Viet Cong areas and the direction of air strikes on them. They were also to conduct bomb damage assessment, conduct small scale reconnaissance and hunter-killer operations, capture and interrogate VC / NVA, tap communications, bug compounds and offices, rescue downed aircrew and prisoners of war, emplace point minefields and other booby traps, conduct psychological operations, and perform counter-intelligence operations. They were to focus on base areas and infiltration routes in the border areas.

== History ==
DELTA originated as LEAPING LENA which was established on 15 May 1964 in order for the USSF to train LLDB teams for missions in South Vietnam. During LEAPING LENA, five teams of eight LLDB soldiers were parachuted into Laos but only five men survived the experience. The US did not participate. On 12 July 1964 a US Special Forces B-Team (B-110) and an A-Team (A-111) from the US 1st Special Forces Group arrived to take over the mission. By October 1964 LEAPING LENA was re-designated Project DELTA with USSF in control and serving alongside LLDB in actual operations. The main base for Project DELTA was established at Nha Trang with half of the A-team at Dong Ba Thin Base Camp to train the 91st Ranger Battalion.

Helicopter insertions and extractions were particularly complex and dangerous. As a result, Delta's senior NCOs devised multiple methods of extraction including ladders and the McGuire rig (named after Sergeant Major Charles T. McGuire). The STABO rig, later developed by SOG, was also incorporated.

Project DELTA ceased operations on 30 June 1970, prior to the establishment of "Operation Blue Light", a unit within 5th SFG (Mott Lake Fort Bragg NC), which was the precursor to the modern Delta Force.

== Organization ==
By 1966, Project DELTA consisted of the following:

- Headquarters Section consisting of 31 US Special Forces and over 50 South Vietnamese Special Forces
- Recon Section. Called Reconnaissance/Hunter Killer teams in the early days of the program, these six teams contained 2 USSF and 8 South Vietnamese LLDB (although some teams were composed of all American or all South Vietnamese personnel). Later Recon reorganized into the Strike Recondo Platoon containing 16 six-man teams (3 USSSF and 3 LLDB).
- Roadrunner Platoon consisting of six and then later twelve four-man CIDG (Civilian Irregular Defense Group program) teams.
- A Security Company consisting of 124 Nungs.
- Bomb Damage Assessment Platoon consisting of four US and 24 Nungs; in 1968 the Nungs became the Primary Immediate Reaction force when Recon Teams were compromised.
- A 200+ civilian work force was based at the Nha Trang base camp and elements of it would accompany DELTA when it traveled to establish Forward Operating Bases (FOB).

MIKE Forces (Mobile Strike Force Command) were battalion and then brigade size reaction forces assigned to aid in case of hostile action but also conduct economy of force operations. Project DELTA's MIKE Force was the 91st Ranger battalion.

Project Delta helicopter aviation support was initially provided by the Vietnamese Air Force 219th Special Operations Squadron (nicknamed "Kingbees") using H-34 Choctaw helicopters for team insertions and extractions. Helicopter support was then taken up by American pilots from the 145th Air Lift Platoon in December 1965. Within 2 months, the 145th was consolidated with the 6th Aviation Platoon to form 2nd Platoon, 171st Aviation Company. 2/171 was later placed within the 281st Assault Helicopter Company (10th Combat Aviation Battalion, 17th Aviation Group (Combat), 1st Aviation Brigade). The 281st AHC was placed under operational control of the 5th Special Forces Group in direct support of Project Delta operations in I and II Corps and provided most of the helicopter air support for Delta until approximately December 1969. When Delta operated in III Corps the Helicopter support was provided by the primary Unit. Project Delta's last operation was in I Corps back to Mai Loc and the 101st Airborne Aviation supported Delta until it was deactivated.

Forward air control was originally provided by Vietnamese L19/O-1 Bird Dog. As Delta was switched to American air assets, forward air control was taken up by the 19th Tactical Air Support Squadron; in May 1965 the 21st Tactical Air Support Squadron assumed the mission. Unlike most other aviation support units, the FACs lived alongside the Delta units they worked with.

Radio relay was initially handled by Vietnamese Air Force C-47 but was switched, due to inadequate loiter time, to the L19/O-1 Bird Dog. Delta also used the U-6 Beaver and/or U-1 Otter of whichever Army Aviation unit was responsible for the Corps area the mission would be conducted in. Nighttime radio relay was provided by the US Air Force's Airborne Battlefield Command and Control Center (ABCCC), a C-130 using the callsign "Moonbeam".

== See also ==
- Project GAMMA
- Operation Wandering Soul (Vietnam War)
