= Miguel de la Peña =

US Army Special Forces officer (1919-2012)

- Born: February 17, 1919; San Antonio, Texas, United States
- Died: September 16, 2012 (aged 93); San Antonio, Texas, United States
- Military career
- Allegiance: United States
- Branch: United States Army
- Service years: 1941–1967
- Rank: Lieutenant Colonel
- Unit: United States Special Forces
- Conflicts: World War II; Liberation of France; Liberation of Czechoslovakia; Korean War; Vietnam War

Lieutenant Colonel Miguel de la Peña (February 17, 1919 in San Antonio – September 16, 2012 in San Antonio) was a United States Army officer and one of the first American officers of Hispanic origin in the United States Special Forces.

De la Peña joined the Army during World War II and fought from Normandy through to Czechoslovakia. He also fought in both the Korean War and Vietnam War.

In 1965 he served as commander of U.S. Special Forces in III Corps, South Vietnam. He was asked to form a battalion designed for special missions. Designated a Mobile Strike, or MIKE Force in his honor, the battalion contained three rifle companies and a heavy weapons company, all led by a U.S. Special Forces A Team.

He retired from the Army in 1967.
