= Green Light teams =

American special forces tasked with nuclear deployment behind enemy lines

Green Light
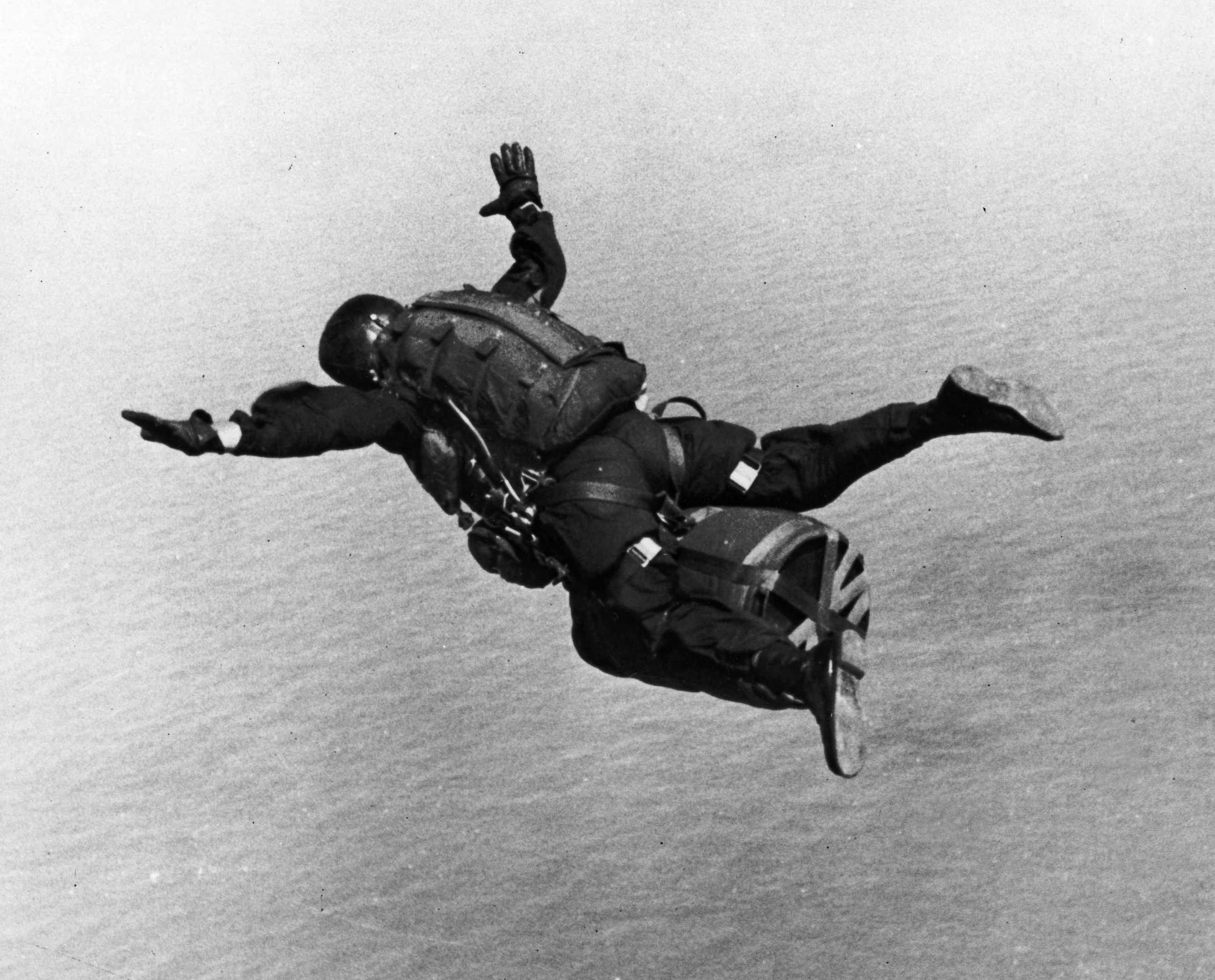
- A United States Army Special Forces paratrooper conducting a HALO jump with a MK54 SADM
- Active: 1962-1989
- Disbanded: 1989
- Country: United States of America
- Branch: United States Army
- Type: Special forces
- Role: Special Atomic Demolition Munition employment, sappers
- Part of: 5th Special Forces Group, 7th Special Forces Group, 10th Special Forces Group
- Garrison/HQ: Smoke Bomb Hill, Fort Bragg, North Carolina
- Equipment: B54 Special Atomic Demolition Munition, T-4 Atomic Demolition Munition

A member of the United States Navy's UDT demonstrating the parachute swimmer delivery method for the MK-54, c. 1960

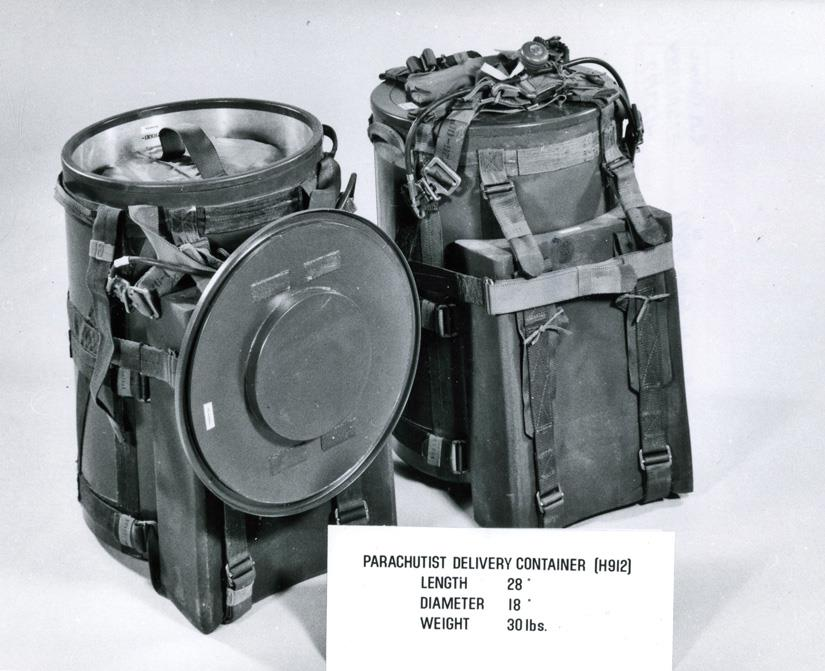
A SADM hard carrying case

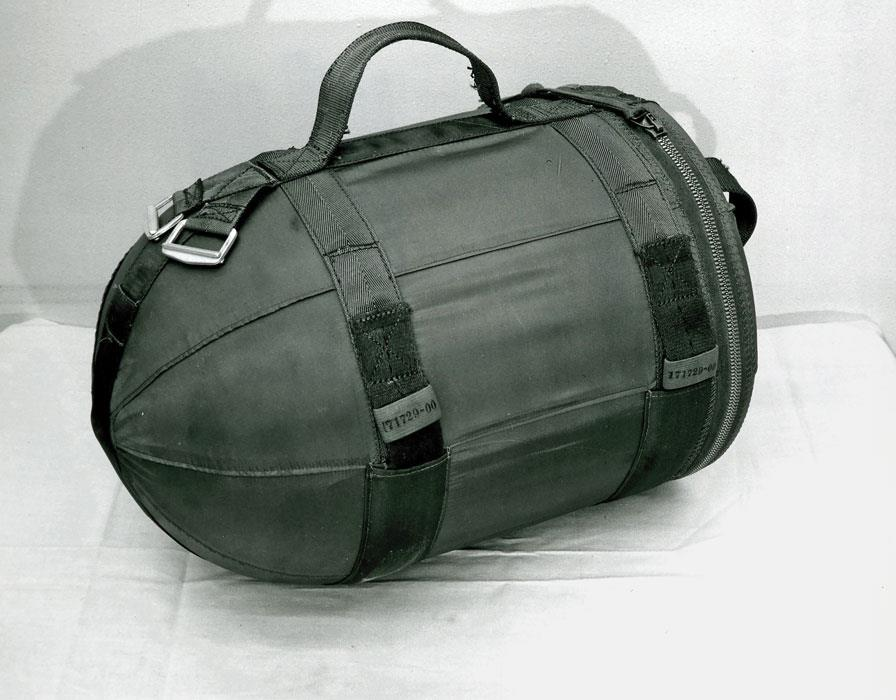
The SADM demolition charge version of the W54 in its carry bag

Green Light teams were small groups of U.S. Army Special Forces trained to advance, arm, and deploy Special Atomic Demolition Munitions (SADM) behind enemy lines. Created in 1962 during the height of the Cold War, they were responsible for infiltrating behind enemy lines to detonate atomic demolition munitions, a type of portable nuclear weapon created in 1954. The last teams were disbanded in 1986.

== Formation ==
During the 1950s, the United States Department of Defense and President Dwight D. Eisenhower were concerned about the nuclear weapons cache and large manpower of the Soviet Union. They embraced a "New Look" idea of limited nuclear war. This new idea of limited nuclear warfare recognized that the Soviets had numerical superiority in Europe, and made up for this with tactical nuclear weapons. Deployment of these tactical nuclear weapons required specially trained soldiers. By January 1958, Special Forces ODAs ("A-teams") were working with the T-4 Atomic Demolition Munition which had been originally fielded in 1956. Their mission was "to safely and securely infiltrate a nuclear weapon into a target area, and detonate on orders of the National Command Authority"; however, the T-4's were too large and heavy to infiltrate easily.

This led to a 1958 DoD request for a feasibility study of a man-portable "Special" Atomic Demolition Munition weighing less than 40 pounds (18 kg), that could be employed by a non-technically trained soldier. In 1959, Sandia National Laboratory proposed an SADM design based on the warhead of the Davy Crockett atomic recoilless rifle, with additional waterproofing to allow it to be emplaced underwater. A prototype version was tested in 1960, with a test jump successfully performed at Fort Bragg, North Carolina by then-Sergeant Joe Garner, who became the first person to freefall with an atomic bomb after departing a H-21 Shawnee helicopter at 8,000 feet (2,400 m). (Note: In 1974, Garner would go on to become a team sergeant for a 7th Special Forces Group Green Light Team.) Full development of the munition began in June 1960, with entry into service in April 1962 for the B54 (or Mk 54) SADM, which was nicknamed the "Green Light device". This led to the creation of the Green Light teams in 1962.

Green Light A-teams worked and trained out of a one-story building at Fort Bragg on what is known as "Smoke Bomb Hill"—the building itself was surrounded by barbed wire and had armed guards at the gate. Green Light recruits were selected from highly experienced freefall parachutists within Special Forces, and were trained and tested on their leadership, engineering, and psychology as well as their mental stability. The recruits also underwent a thorough background check by DoD before being confirmed into the SADM program. Green Light members who were special forces veterans of the Vietnam War, particularly those involved with the Son Tay raid, formed a sizable portion of the initial cadre of Blue Light, the first permanent counterterrorism unit established by the Army. According to Blue Light member Thomas "Taffy" Carlin, half of the initial group had been assigned to Green Light teams. Due to the proximity of the two units at the time of Blue Light's formation—both were located on Smoke Bomb Hill, along with Blue Light conducting its initial formation inside the Green Light team building before moving to their own compound at Mott Lake, across Fort Bragg—several of the initial Blue Light selectees mistakenly thought they were being assigned to Green Light.

== Training ==
Green Light team recruits would endure around twelve hours instruction in a classroom each day, while additionally working through concentrated exercises. Robert Deifel, an officer who was recruited and a member of a Green Light team, described the tactical training the recruits were subjected to as "very intense". The tactical training often took place throughout the day with a short break followed by more intense tactical training well into the night. Deifel recalls exercises where they were often in the woods in the middle of the night, with the mission to reach the top of a hill.

The targets for the SADMs included dams, enemy troop formations, bridges, and ports. Locations included Eastern Europe, parts of the Middle East including Iran, Cuba, and Korea. In the 1980s, under the concept of "Follow-on Forces Attack", Green Light's SADMs were to be directed to prioritize destruction of subsequent waves of Warsaw Pact's second and third-line forces before they reached NATO positions. Because these targets were all around the world in different locations and terrains, the Green Light Troops were trained to reach their targets by land, air, and sea. These troops were trained to sneak behind enemy lines with the tactical nuclear weapon strapped to their back. This was not easy, as the Mark-54 SADMs weighed approximately 58.5 pounds (26.5 kg), was 18 inches (460 mm) in length, and 12 inches (300 mm) in diameter. Some Green Light teams were missioned such that simple but secret ground truck transport to the target was feasible. Some Green Light teams were trained to transport their bomb underwater if necessary. These Green Light Troops specialized in scuba and underwater missions. The United States Atomic Energy Commission, or AEC, even produced pressurized encasements for the tactical nuclear weapon to travel underwater at depths as deep as 200 feet (61 m). In practice, underwater insertions were typically done at a depth of only 10m (at which the SADM was watertight) due to limitations with the rebreathers the teams used. Green Light teams often consisted of three men who trained using actual atomic weapons. Green Light team member Billy Waugh recalled being launched subsurface from the U.S. nuclear attack submarine USS Grayback while carrying an actual atomic weapon, a W54 SADM. One Green Light team member, Bill Flavin, recalled the Green Light team he commanded was trained to ski down a mountain with the SADM: "It skied down the mountain; you did not". Snowshoe insertions were also frequent for European teams. Flavin, as well as other Green Light officers, was trained and certified as a nuclear targeting officer.

Green Light teams trained to parachute with the SADM from aircraft, including the MC-130 Hercules. In at least one instance, a Green Light team from 7th Special Forces Group's ODA 745 were given what they believed to be a live SADM device and told they were on a live operation and would be jumping into Cuba to destroy a dam; only after the team had successfully completed the jump were they informed they had actually jumped into New Mexico. The mission was likely a training run for a theoretical demolition of the Hanabanilla Dam. Captain Tom Davis, a Green Light team member, trained for an operation in which his team parachuted from a cargo plane behind enemy lines with the SADM. Jumping the SADM was considered extremely difficult, as the 59 lb weight (vastly exceeding the 40 lb maximum called for by the design) made controlling one's orientation challenging even for very experienced freefall parachutists. As a result, approximately 90% of jumps involving the B54 SADM missed their intended dropzones.In one case in 1985, during the Return of Forces to Germany (REFORGER) exercises, the insertion aircraft flew over the wrong dropzone and mistakenly inserted a team with a live SADM into France, rather than West Germany as intended.

Along with all the pre-mission training, field training and technique was equally as important to the success of the operation. The team of soldiers was trained in handling nuclear weapons periodically. On the missions, the soldiers were highly trained in the handling and detonation of the tactical nuclear device, as well as its proper destruction in the case of being spotted by enemy soldiers or the mission being aborted. Green Light teams wore fatigues without military markings or insignia. The team of soldiers on the Green Light missions were often instructed to deploy the nuclear device at a distance to where they could ensure their own safety as well as that of the nuclear weapon. The team members could have even been tasked with burying the nuclear device underground, typically to prevent discovery. They were able to bury the device to a depth of 12 feet (3.7 m), though 9 feet (2.7 m) was typically executed. The soldiers had to confirm that an enemy combatant would not locate the device and that it was still detonated on time without disruption. The tactical nuclear devices were detonated by either mechanical or radio detonators. Since a nuclear exchange across the globe could involve electromagnetic (EMP) bursts, the devices had backups to the electrical systems. Early models contained a mechanical detonation line merely 330 feet (100 m) long from nuclear device to detonation team. When inserted by parachute, one man would jump with the SADM, another with the planewave generator to detonate it, and a third with conventional explosives to destroy the munition if the team were compromised. While teams were trained to jump three bombs at a time (with a 12-man freefall ODA split into 4-man groups), some teams preferred to jump with only a single device. Teams were trained to jump the SADM both via static-line and freefall.

== Kamikaze missions ==
Because of the vast difficulty and extreme danger that came along with handling SADMs, the extreme versions of transportation needed for the tactical nuclear weapon, and the stealth-like, perfect manner in which the missions had to be executed, Green Light teams are comparable to the Japanese kamikaze pilots. The general thought of many of the members of these Green Light teams was that these missions were near suicidal. One Green Light team member, Louis Frank Napoli, said of the missions: "We were kamikaze pilots without the airplanes". Robert Deifel, another Green Light team member, said of the missions: "There was no room for error... We had to be absolutely perfect". In many cases, the soldiers involved never saw an extraction plan; according to one Green Light team member, "You were under the impression that you were expendable."

The risk was extremely prevalent when discussing the possible time frame for when these atomic devices could ignite on a mechanical timer. This timer would become less efficient and more risky the longer the duration of the timer was set. The team members had been informed that the timers could go off up to eight minutes earlier than desired and even thirteen minutes after expected. This would obviously create a time crisis for the Green Light team members operating the mission. If the team members were instructed to bury the nuclear device, they certainly may have been able to evade the explosion, but radioactive fallout could still cause heavy damage. The official minimum safe distance was 732 metres (2,402 ft); this minimum was frequently disregarded by the teams who often considered their missions "suicide missions."

== Secrecy ==
As a result of the tremendous danger these missions posed, they would likely have been highly scrutinized if known to the general public. Also, if the enemy had caught wind of such plans as well, they could plan and counter accordingly. Due to these reasons, the Green Light team missions were top secret. The members of the teams could not even discuss their objective with their spouse. The fact that these missions were kept top secret meant that few medals or recognition were ever bestowed upon the Green Light team members. Former Green Light team member Robert Deifel retired from military service with six medals, but says he received copious letters from various military personnel and generals commending him and his team members for their accomplishments.

Another key reason the SADMs and Green Light teams operations were kept highly secretive was also due to the targets and locations of the tactical nuclear weapons. As a counter to the Warsaw Pact forces perceivably outgunning and outmanning the NATO (North Atlantic Treaty Organization) during the standstill of the Cold War, President Dwight D. Eisenhower and his generals intended for the Green Light teams to conduct missions not only in NATO occupied countries, but also in the Warsaw Pact nations. This new form of attack was to be used as a weapon to stop an enemy attack in its tracks or eliminate enemy nuclear devices. In order for such an operation to be successful, especially in the midst of a total nuclear war, this form of retaliation needed to be swift and efficient. That meant that these Atomic Demolition Munitions needed to be quickly accessed and deployed. Hundreds of these tactical nuclear devices were stashed throughout Europe and in NATO's arsenal.

The Green Light team missions were not publicly disclosed until 1984 when military documents and papers from the Natural Resources Defense Council were outlined to the public. Many people, along with the American Congress, were skeptical of the concept of tactical nuclear devices being employed by a group of soldiers. At the time of the Atomic Demolition Munitions program's inception in the 1950s, the idea and practicality of this new smaller, tactical warfare was rational. In the Cold War's final few years of conflict and as concepts such as "limited nuclear war" were adapted, the practicality of the weapons were "obsolete", according to President George H. W. Bush. This further led to an increasing number of nuclear devices being relinquished or destroyed by all sides of the war. When NBC Nightly News ran two stories in the 1980s depicting the plan by the United States to operate Special Forces-led missions involving Atomic Demolition Munitions, West Germany's Defense Minister Manfred Wörner led the plea for the United States to remove its Atomic Demolition Munitions cache in the area. By 1988, the last approximately 300 SADMs owned by the United States were withdrawn from the NATO arsenal. In 1989, the SADMs weapon and the Green Light teams were officially retired. By the end of the Cold War, not a single Green Light team conducted a real mission involving SADMs. According to Flavin, based on the complete list of 1st Battalion, 10th Special Forces Group's targeting packages, Green Light may have never been intended for actual usage and may have had more value to war planners as a psychological deterrent to Soviet military planners.

== Equipment ==
As the primary mission of Green Light teams was the delivery and employment of SADMs, the B54 SADM was the key piece of equipment around which the teams were designed. Early iterations of the Green Light teams also trained and qualified on the T-4 Atomic Demolition Munition, a bulky and unwieldy predecessor to the more compact B54. The B54 SADMs assigned to Green Light teams had two selectable yield settings: 0.1 or 0.2 kilotons. They were protected by mechanical locks, and ran on mechanical timers out of concerns that radiation could interfere with any electronic mechanisms. The device itself weighed 59 lbs and measured 17 x 12 inches. Teams trained with both live and inert practice versions of the munitions; even the inert training versions were considered so highly sensitive that lethal force was authorized to defend them. Training to unlock, arm and disarm the devices was conducted at the nuclear weapons storage facility on Chicken Road at Fort Bragg.

Small arms equipment included CAR-15 carbines and .45 caliber pistols (likely M1911's), the latter of which were always carried loaded even on training missions, in the event of an attempt to steal the munition. Some members of 7th Group teams were issued Tudor Pelagos watches, in case of a need to trade them as part of an escape and evasion plan.

== Other ADM forces ==
The Green Light teams were not the only operators of atomic demolition munitions; conventional Army engineer units located in West Germany such as the 567th Engineer Company (ADM) out of Hanau, also were tasked with SADM missions (though they were not tasked with parachute or other special insertion methods, they would drive the munitions to the target). The conventional ADM teams were tasked with maintaining prepared positions (essentially locked manhole covers) near the East German border for subsequent delivery of SADMs. The conventional forces also operated in secrecy; however they were not aware of the existence of the Green Light teams, nor would they keep their SADMs in inventory until an alert of a Soviet invasion.

Naval Special Warfare teams also were tasked with the SADM mission, starting with the underwater demolition teams (UDT) and eventually the Navy SEALs.

== Known SADM teams ==
=== Green Light teams ===
5th Special Forces Group:

- ODA 542 (ruck team)
- ODA 544 (freefall team)
- ODA 545 (dive team—was originally designated ODA 543).
- ODA 541 (special projects—research and development)
- ODA 572 (freefall team)

7th Special Forces Group

- ODA 745 (freefall team)

=== Non-Green Light teams ===
U.S. Army Europe:

- 567th Engineer Company (ADM)

Naval Special Warfare:

- UDT 21 (later, SEAL Team 4)

== See also ==
- List of former United States special operations units
- Detachment A
- Blue Light
