= McGuire rig =

Military extraction harness device

The McGuire Rig was used to extract soldiers from the jungles of Vietnam. It would be suspended from a helicopter and used to extract soldiers from areas without a suitable pick-up zone. It was simple, inexpensive, and effective. Although less comfortable than the STABO (Short Tactical Air Borne Operations) harness, it did not require the soldiers to carry any special equipment. It was designed by Sergeant Major Charles T. McGuire, a member of Project DELTA, a Special Forces reconnaissance project.

The McGuire Rig was fashioned from a 2-inch (51 mm) wide, 15-foot (4.6 m) long A7A nylon cargo tie-down strap with a quick-fit buckle on one end. This was typically cut down to an 8-foot (2.4 m) length and a 18-inch (460 mm) web loop (wrist strap) attached near the top end. This was used to form a sling loop and attached to an over 100-foot (30 m) length of 5/8-inch nylon rope. Three ropes with McGuire Rigs attached could be dropped from a UH-1 "Huey" helicopter, all on the same side. A deployment pack containing a sandbag carried each rope to the ground. The soldiers attached their rucksacks with a snap link, stepped into the loop, adjusted it, inserted their left hand in the wrist loop, and on signal the helicopter lifted off. The three men would lock arms to prevent oscillation and prevent falls if a rope were shot through; a wounded or unconscious man could fall from the harness unless secured. The system did not allow the extracted soldiers to be hoisted into the helicopter. They were flown out of the danger area and then set down in a clearing in order to board the helicopter. On long flights the harness proved to be extremely uncomfortable.

From the pilot's standpoint, performing an extraction using a McGuire Rig required intense concentration. Once the soldiers were in the rig, the pilot would attempt to gain altitude by rising straight up, but with the nearest ground reference over 100 feet away, it was difficult to discern when the helicopter was moving. There was the distinct possibility, therefore, that the soldier(s) would be dragged through tree limbs during the extraction.

CPT John W. "Jack" Green, III, flying a UH-1B for the 145th Airlift Platoon in support of Project Delta, was the first pilot to utilize the McGuire Rig in an emergency extraction. In mid-1966, 145th was blended into the 281st AHC, which then assumed the mission of supporting Project Delta. Due to intense training with the MACV Recondo School and on-the-job training with Project Delta, the 281st AHC became highly proficient in usage of the McGuire Rig.

== See also ==
- Sky hook/Fulton surface-to-air recovery system
- Military Assistance Command, Vietnam – Studies and Observations Group
