= Special Atomic Demolition Munition =

Man-portable nuclear weapons

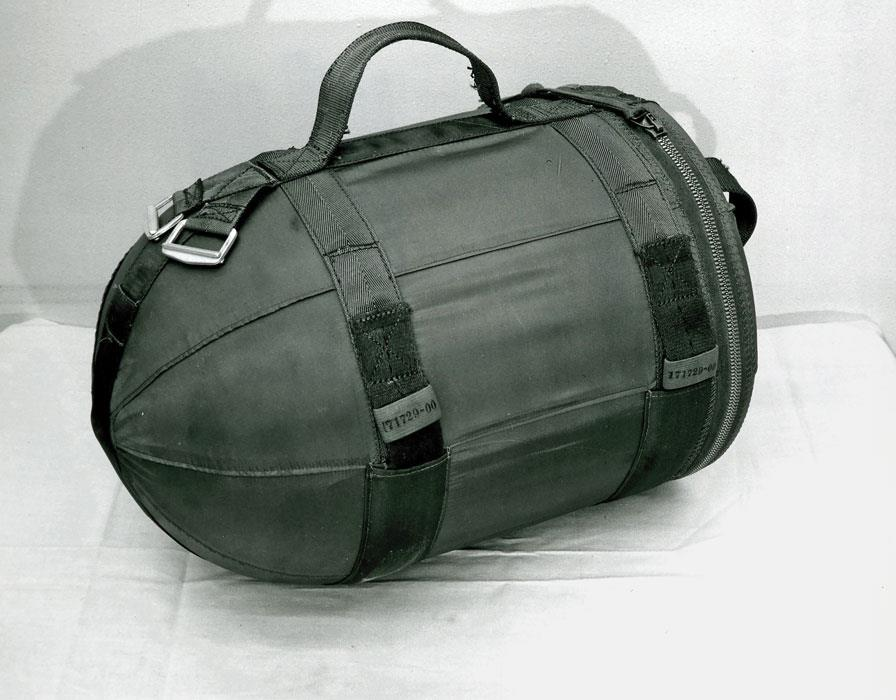
SADM in its carry bag

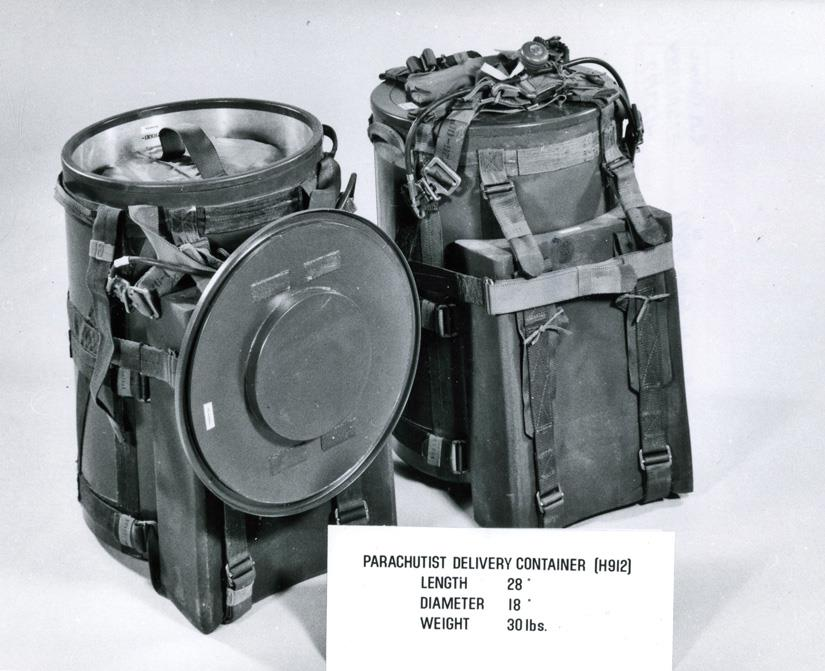
SADM hard carrying case

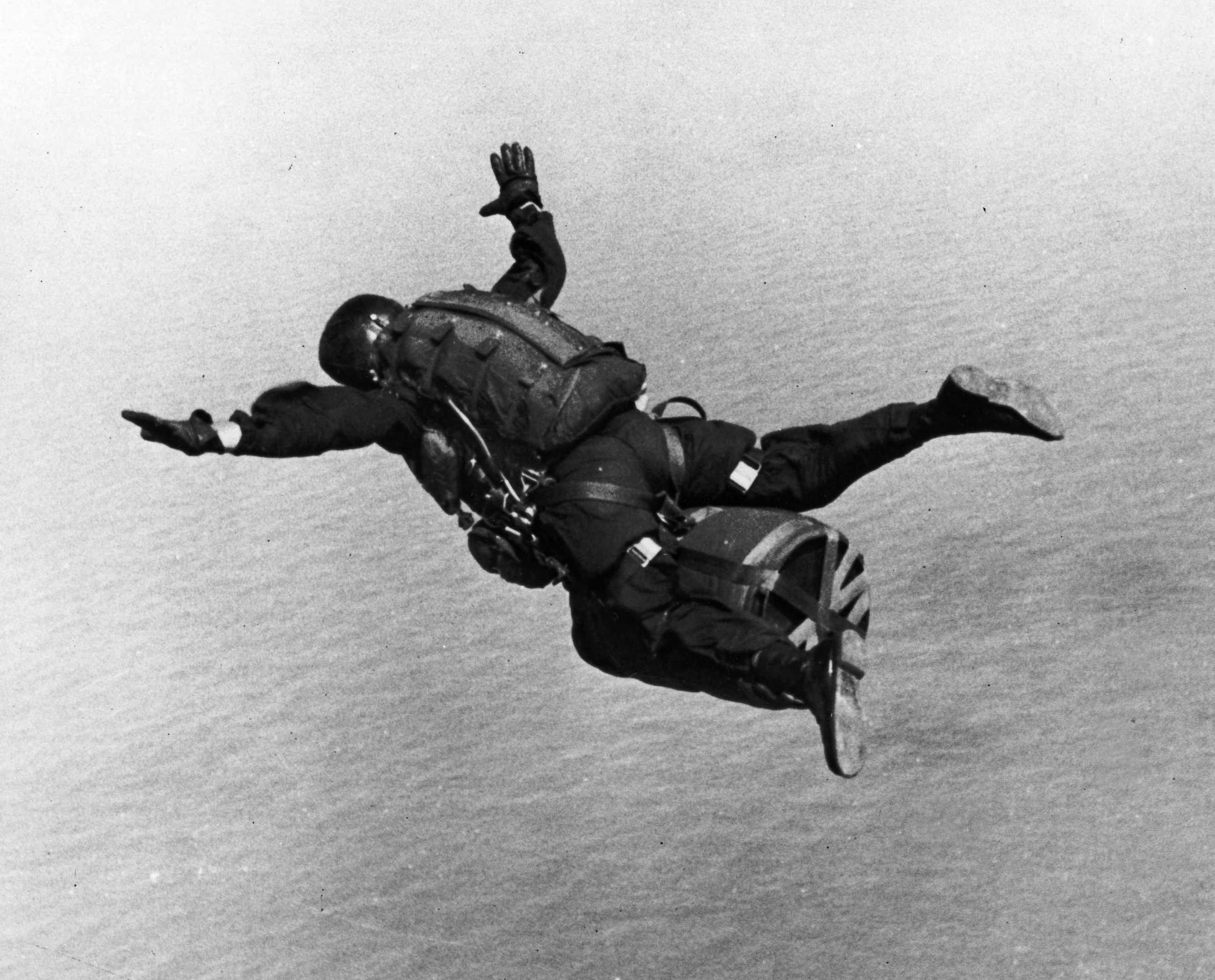
A U.S. Army Special Forces paratrooper conducts a high-altitude low-opening military freefall jump with an MK–54 SADM

The Special Atomic Demolition Munition (SADM), also known as the XM129 and XM159 Atomic Demolition Charges, and the B54 bomb was a nuclear man-portable atomic demolition munition (ADM) system fielded by the US military from the 1960s to 1980s but never used in combat. It had an estimated yield of up to 1 kiloton of TNT.

== History and design ==
At the time of the weapon's development, the existing Atomic Demolition Munition (ADM) was the T-4 Atomic Demolition Munition. Its transport required 4 men, each carrying a 40-pound (18 kg) section of the weapon.

Development began in June 1960 and an interim Mark 54 Mod 0 (now called the B54-0) weapon was put into production in April 1963. Production of the B54 Mod 1 SADM began in August 1964. The weapon was 12 inches (305 mm) in diameter, 18 inches (457 mm) long, and weighed 58.5 pounds (26.5 kg). It included the warhead, a fuzing and firing system with a mechanical timer, a ferroelectric firing set, and a sealed housing. The body was constructed with aluminum forgings and molded fiberglass, and foam-rubber insulation was used between the warhead and case. Dials were illuminated with tritium-phosphor paint for easy night-reading. A housing for underwater emplacement was provided that included external controls.

The B54 Mod 2 started production in June 1965. The weapon was the same size as previous mods but now weighed more – 70 pounds (32 kg).

The yield was estimated to be 10 to 1,000 tons of TNT (42 to 4,184 GJ). Yield options were known to be selectable from 0.1 or 0.2 kiloton presets.

== Use ==
=== Offensive use ===
ADM employment manuals describe the use of ADMs tactically in both offensive and defensive operations.

In offensive operations, ADMs are described as being useful for improving flank and rear security of a unit, impeding counterattacks and assisting in enemy entrapment.

=== Engineering and defensive use ===
ADM employment manuals describe the use of ADMs defensively for combat engineering purposes. Possible targets described include bridges, dams, canals, tunnels, airfields, railroad marshaling yards, ports and industrial plants, and power facilities.

Extensive tables were provided to enable the selection of the correct yield for each particular target. These tables accounted for various employment particulars such as depth of burial, fallout considerations, and minimum safe separation distances between adjacent weapons and personnel.

== Suicide attack allegations ==
A weapon training film for the bomb

On December 27, 2018, the Green Bay Press-Gazette interviewed veteran Mark Bentley, who had trained for the Special Atomic Demolition Munition program to manually place and detonate the SADM. Bentley stated that he and other soldiers training for the program knew this was a suicide mission, because soldiers would probably be ordered to secure the site before the timer went off.

Employment manuals specifically describe the firing party and their guard retreating from the emplacement site, at which point security of the device is provided through a combination of passive security measures, including concealment, camouflage, and the use of decoys, as well as active security measures including booby traps, obstacles (such as concertina wire and landmines), and long-range artillery fire. Further, the SADM included a Field Wire Remote Control System (FWRCS), a device that enabled the sending of safe/arm and firing signals to the weapon via a wire for safe remote detonation of the weapon.

== See also ==
- Green Light Teams
- List of nuclear weapons
- Medium Atomic Demolition Munition
- Suitcase nuclear device
- W54 Warhead
