= Reconnaissance Projects =

American special forces teams active during the Vietnam War

There were four Greek letter special forces Reconnaissance Projects formed by the Military Assistance Command, Vietnam, (MACV) Studies and Observations Group (SOG) during the Vietnam War to collect operational intelligence in remote areas of South Vietnam.

== Mission ==
Their mission include operational and strategic reconnaissance into long held Vietcong areas and direct air strikes on them, they were also to conduct bomb damage assessment, conduct small scale reconnaissance and hunter-killer operations, capture and interrogate VC / NVA tap communications, bug compounds and offices, rescue downed aircrew and prisoners of war, emplace point minefields and other booby traps, conduct Psychological Operations, and perform counter intelligence operations.

They were to focus on base areas and infiltration routes in the border areas.

== Operations ==
These missions were carried out by small United States Army Special Forces and native personnel reconnaissance teams and Roadrunner teams posing as the VC. Battalion sized Reaction Forces were assigned to each project with their mission being to assist in the extraction of a compromised team and also to conduct raids and other economy of force type operations.

== The Projects ==
There were four Greek Letter reconnaissance Projects:

- Project DELTA
- Project GAMMA
- Project SIGMA
- Project OMEGA

== See also ==
- 5th Special Forces Group (United States)
- MACVSOG
- Project GAMMA
