= HUMINT/CI Exploitation Teams =

A human intelligence exploitation team is a tactical collection asset usually at the battalion or higher level that uses HUMINT techniques such as interrogations and source operations to collect information to fulfill intelligence requirements.

== History ==
The concept of HUMINT Exploitation Teams were first developed in the 1990s; it is not clear exactly when the teams were introduced into the operational environment, but most operational doctrine dates back to 1997. Even though doctrine gives a standard layout of a HET, HETs are very adaptable in terms of organization and being able to adapt to almost any collection environment. HET teams were first heavily implemented by the U.S. Marines, then the U.S. Army in Iraq and Afghanistan. These teams were highly successful because of their capability to be a tactical collection asset as well as a tactical assault team. This gave commanders the ability to not only use the teams for intelligence collection but also for tactical objectives. Before Iraq and Afghanistan, HET teams were mostly used for very sensitive operations in mostly non-combat environments. However, there were very few of these operations compared to the massive number and use of HET teams in Iraq and Afghanistan in the past decade.

== Organization and roles of HETs ==
Both the U.S. Marines and the U.S. Army currently use HET teams; although their versions may differ slightly the basic organization and roles are largely the same. An HET team typically has four to eight members. The size and ratio of the team is largely dependent on what type of operation is going to be carried out by the team, but each member has a dedicated role to play in the team. In each HET team there is a HUMINT Officer/Warrant (35F/351B) or a CI Officer/Warrant (35E/351E), who is responsible for overall command of the team and planning of all operations. The HUMINT/CI Officer reports directly to the HUMINT Tactical Operations Center (H-TOC) Battle Captain, who is typically an O-3/CPT HUMINT/CI(35F/35E) commissioned officer. The Battle Captain receives collection requirements as well as tasking for the HET teams from the S2X, who is responsible for all HUMINT/CI assets in the battalion or brigade. A Team Chief, typically a HUMINT(351B) or CI(351E) warrant officer, is responsible for supervising, planning, and coordinating the execution of HUMINT operations. The team chief/operations technician is the technical expert in the team, having the greatest level of detail on all intelligence related operations. The team also has one SSG (E-6) who is either a CI Agent/HUMINT Collector(35L/35M), one SGT (E-5) who is either a CI Agent/HUMINT Collector (35L/35M), and two SPCs (E-4) who are either CI Agents/HUMINT Collectors(35L/35M). This combination of intelligence professionals, all with their own roles, enables the team to quickly and efficiently collect on a variety of targets without overstretching capabilities or putting the team in danger. This efficiency and quickness in collection is what has made HET teams so effective in both Iraq and Afghanistan over the last decade as well as making them essential to the targeting of insurgent organizations.

=== Mission and effectiveness ===
The HET team's mission is to collect and report timely, accurate, and mission focused information from human sources in order to fulfill tactical, MEF, theater and national level intelligence requirements. The HETs were so effective as a collection asset in Iraq, a Former Assistant Chief of Staff, G-2, Multi-National Force -West, was quoted as saying "The HET teams produced more reporting... than any other intel asset we have out there". However, the overall effectiveness of HET teams as well as their success were always very dependent on a complex command and control relationship that extends all the way to the C/J/G/S2X. Although, HET teams were highly effective in collecting, the validity of the information collected by them would sometimes be called into question. As with humans and human error there were errors and inconsistencies in some of the information collected by the HET teams. Even with some errors in the information collected by the HET teams, much of the information collected by them were instrumental in targeting and combating insurgent organizations such as the Taliban and Al-Qaeda. Because of this effectiveness the HET teams were widely implemented and increased in number in Afghanistan.
