= Fast-roping =

Military technique

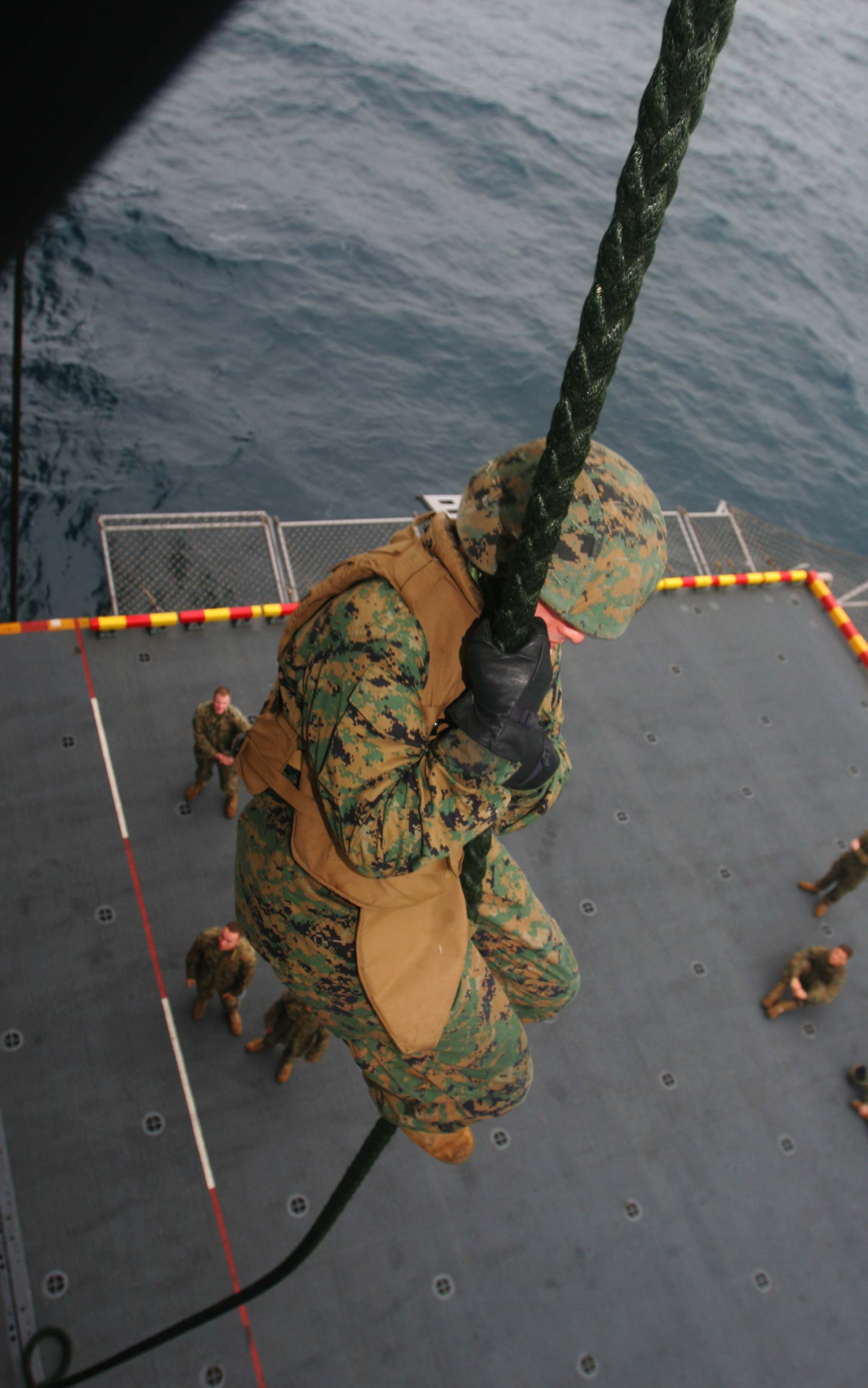
Marine from the U.S. 31st Marine Expeditionary Unit fast-roping from a CH-46E Sea Knight helicopter during a training exercise in 2008.

Fast-roping is a technique for descending a thick rope, allowing troops to deploy from a helicopter in places where the aircraft cannot touch down.

The person holds onto the rope with gloved hands (with or without using their feet) and slides down it. Several people can slide down the same rope simultaneously, provided that there is a gap of about 3 metres (10 ft) between them, so that each one has time to get out of the way when they reach the ground.

Fast roping is quicker than abseiling (rappelling), although more dangerous, particularly if the person is carrying a heavy load, because the rope is not attached to them with a descender. The technique is particularly useful for naval infantry, who can use it to board ships at sea.

== History ==
The technique was first developed by the UK with British rope manufacturer Marlow Ropes, and first used in combat during the Falklands War. The original rope was made of thick nylon that could be used in a manner akin to a fireman's pole. The special ropes used today are braided (plaited), producing a pattern on the outer circumference that is not smooth and so is easier to grip. Originally, each person reaching the bottom would then hold the rope to stabilize it for the next person, but this has been phased out.

== Equipment and techniques ==
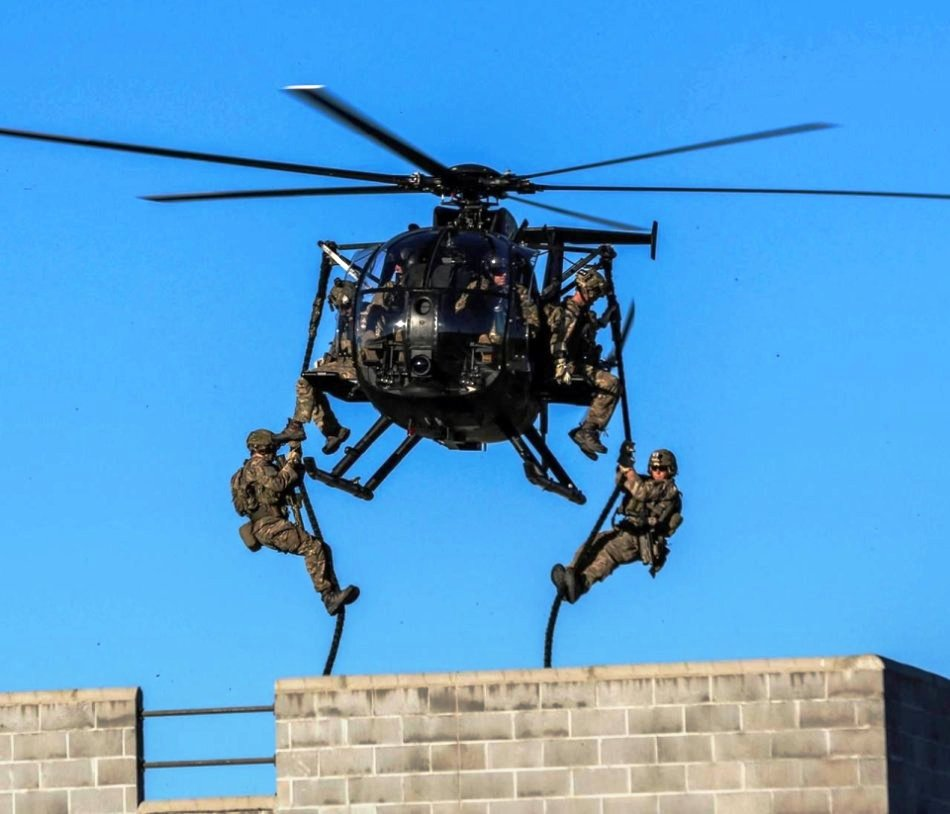
US Army Rangers fast-rope out of a MH-6 Little Bird on the roof of a building during a close quarters combat exercise

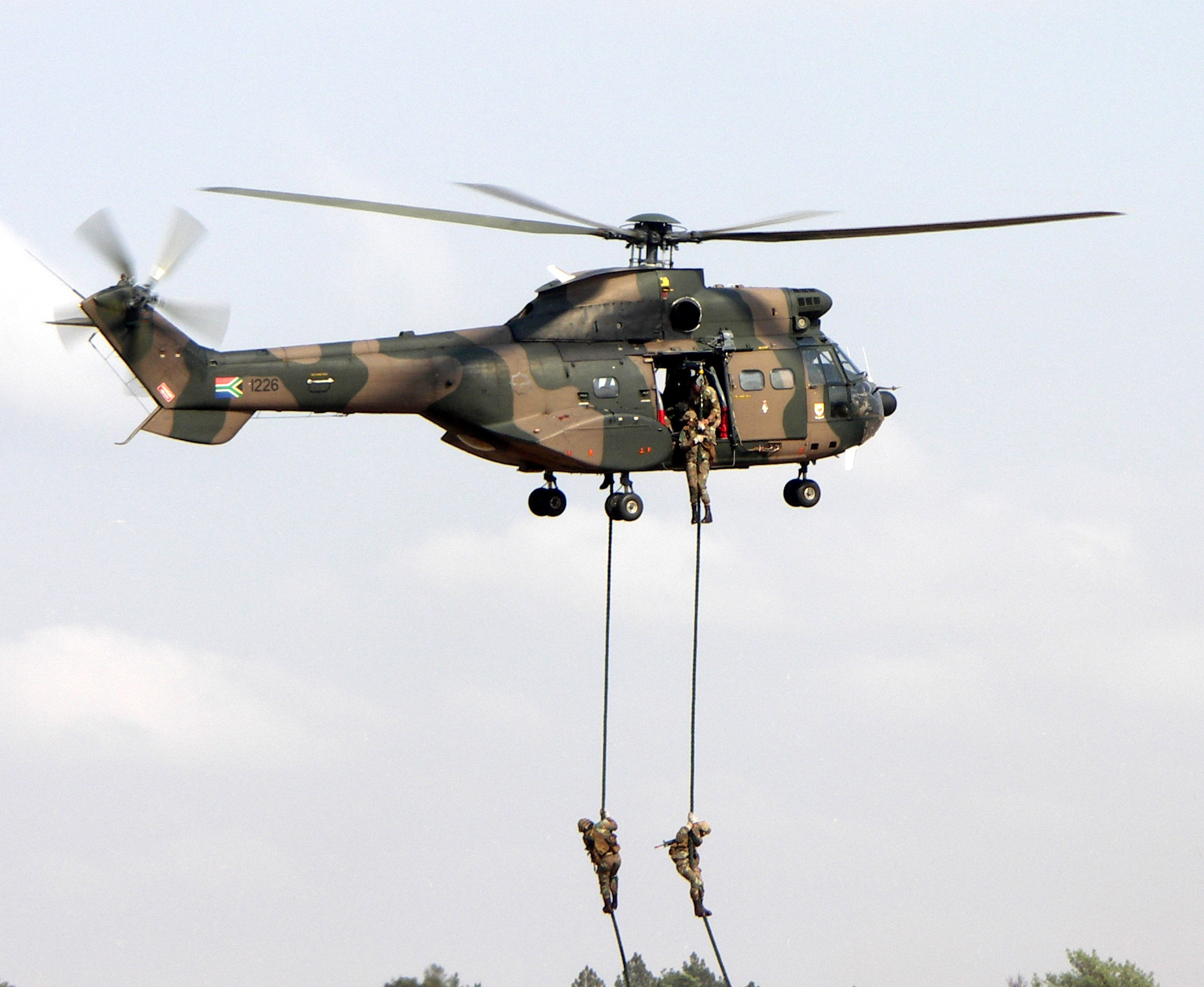
South African soldiers fast-roping from an Atlas Oryx helicopter

=== Rope ===
The rope must be thick, typically 40 mm (1.57 in) diameter, to prevent it from being wildly jerked about from the rotor blast of the helicopter. Some types have a weighted core, the ballast helping to combat the blast effect.

=== Glove techniques ===
Fast-ropers use heat-resistant gloves to protect their hands from the heat of friction while descending. Such gloves are generally not dextrous enough to be useful after the descent has been completed, though specialized gloves have been developed for this purpose. More often, a glove-inside-glove technique is used, with tactical gloves worn inside heavy leather metalworking gloves. After descending the rope, the wearer removes the outer gloves to regain dexterity.

=== Use of feet ===
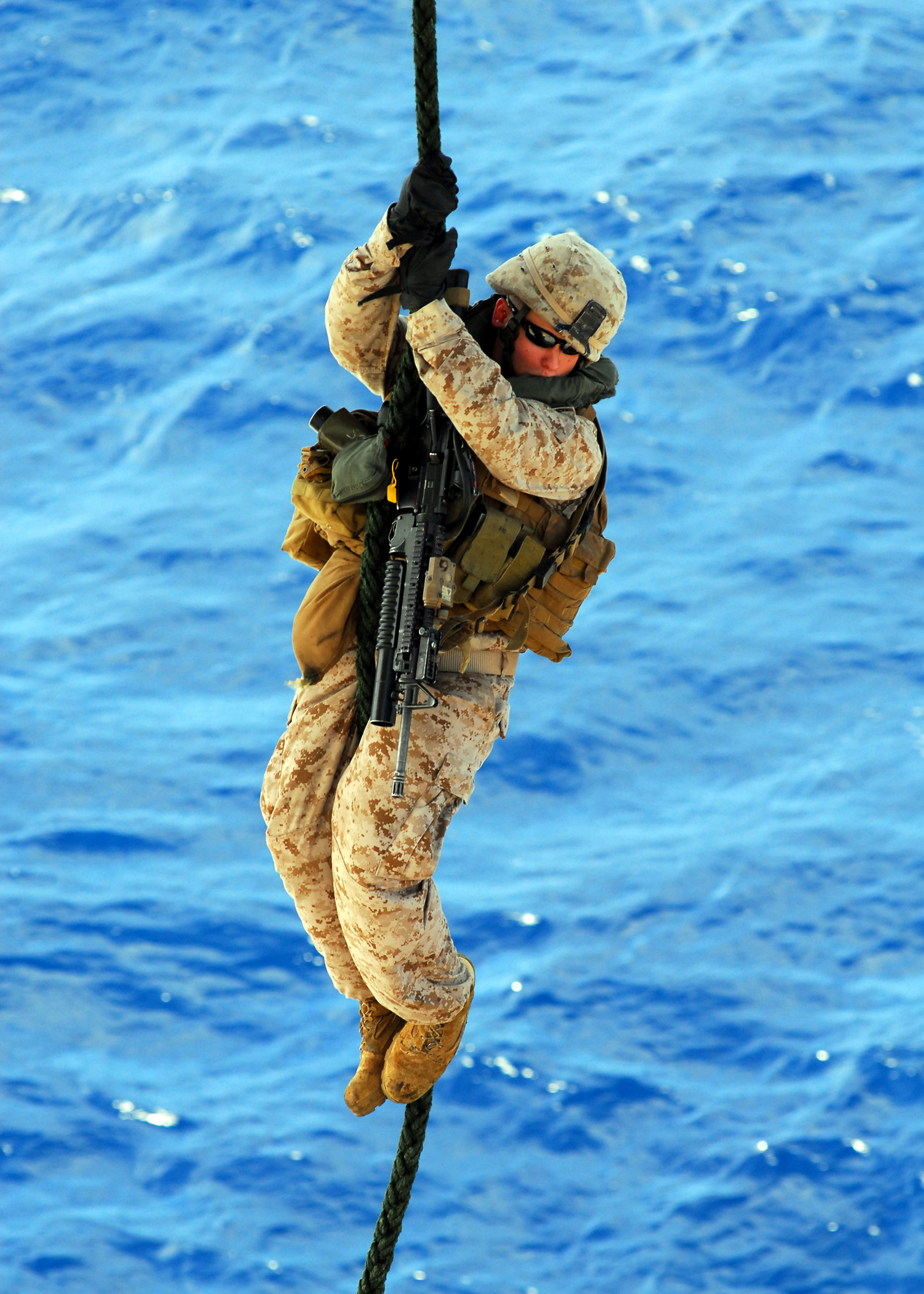
Fast-roper using his feet while descending to control his speed.

While U.S. Marine Corps fast-ropers are trained to control their speed of descent by using their legs and feet (in addition to their hands) to help prevent their gloves from becoming too hot, the British military advises against use of the feet, as boot polish or boot leather can make the rope extremely slippery and thus make the descent more dangerous for subsequent fast-roping personnel.

Deployment of around 25 fast-ropers onto a ship can take about 30 seconds.

== See also ==
- Special Patrol Insertion/Extraction
