= Detachment A =

Special Forces unit from the Cold War

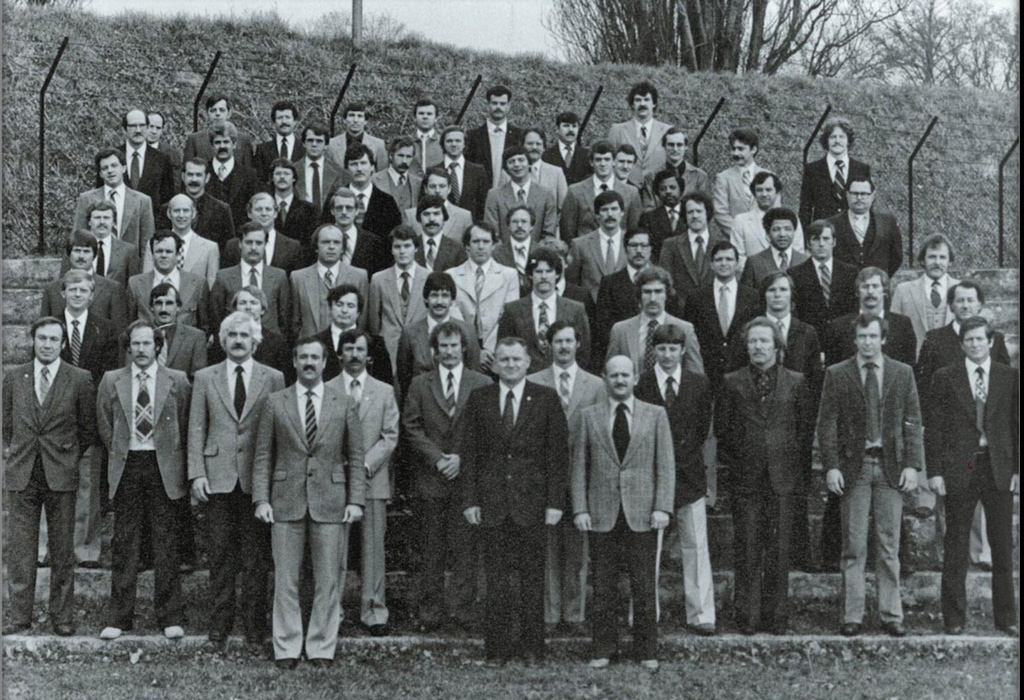
The men of Detachment A, during the Berlin Brigade years.

Detachment "A" (often shortened to "Det A") was a clandestine United States Army Special Forces unit based in West Berlin during the Cold War. Officially designated as the 39th Special Forces Detachment (Airborne), it operated from 1956 until its inactivation in 1984. Detachment A was tasked with operations behind enemy lines in the event of a conflict with the Soviet Bloc, including sabotage of key targets and organizing stay-behind resistance in East Germany. Its existence and activities remained highly classified throughout its service.

== History ==
In August 1956, six modified Operational Detachment Alpha teams and a staff element selected from the 10th Special Forces Group left Bad Tölz in privately owned vehicles for West Berlin. Each team was composed of one senior NCO (a master sergeant) and five enlisted team members; with the staff, the group comprised approximately 90 men. Days later, these forces would form Detachment A on 1 September 1956. Within the Army, its unclassified nickname was "Detachment A," while its formal unit title – 39th Special Forces Detachment – and its actual mission were kept classified. By 1958, after several moves, the unit rehomed at the Andrews Barracks, West Berlin, and was reassigned to HHC, US Army Garrison, Berlin. To maintain secrecy, in 1962 the unit was again reorganized and nominally listed as the Security Platoon, Regimental Headquarters, 6th Infantry Regiment, part of the U.S. Army's Berlin Brigade. Their working offices were a former base of the Waffen SS, which included an old firing range in the basement where the SS had reportedly conducted executions. By this time the ODAs had reorganized into five (later six) mission task forces, each with compartmentalized priorities, such as dive operations or free-fall. The unit continued to operate under strict cover until it was finally inactivated on 30 December 1984. Its role was considered unique, and few official records were kept due to the sensitive nature of its assignments; only decades later were details of Det A's activities publicly acknowledged. The unit is now widely acknowledged to have been illegal under the Four Powers Act due to its status as an "elite" unit. Despite this, it was widely known in special operation circles that the British Special Air Service, US Special Forces, and Soviet Spetsnaz were all present and violating the agreement, with the Spetsnaz having a mirrored stay-behind mission in the event of a NATO breakthrough towards Russia.

The initial four "A-teams" of 11 men each were each assigned an area of responsibility in Berlin roughly corresponding to the north, east, west, and south sides of the city. Two more teams would eventually be added, with a "B-team" above them; the entire unit was no larger than ninety soldiers at a time. While Det A was considered at the time one of the best assignments in Special Forces, little was known about it even among Special Forces—soldiers often came to the unit because an assignment in Germany sounded appealing or on the recommendation of their NCOs, without any understanding of their secretive mission until after they arrived in Berlin. In at least one case, a radio repairman assigned to support Det A was not informed of the unit's classified mission for several years until he became a Special Forces NCO.

In 1974, Det A conducted a training mission with the Berlin Police counterterrorism unit, in which the Americans were to conduct a mock sabotage attack of the local water works. The Germans, tipped off about the event, infiltrated additional police officers into the facility, prompting a firefight with blank rounds that forced Det A to withdraw from the facility. A nearby three-man Det A element providing overwatch also attempted to withdraw in a civilian Fiat; however they were trapped in a cul-de-sac near the British Officer's Housing complex by two busloads of Berlin Polizei. The element engaged the police in a blank-firefight, but were overrun and captured. The entire event was observed by the British Provost Marshal, who mistakenly believed the Americans to be British officers and the German police to be members of the IRA, and deployed British military police armed with live ammunition. Though neither the Americans nor Germans were injured, the involved parties were arrested in a security embarrassment that made local news media.

== Mission ==
=== Penetration of East Germany ===
Preparation for covert infiltration into East Germany was a primary mission for Detachment A in both peacetime and war. Det-A teams covertly acquired safe houses through associates in the German community, along with Volkswagen vans and buses with the American license plates swapped out for German ones when they wanted to recon the border. Teams would secret themselves in the safe houses, and be on twenty-four hour standby in case of Soviet invasion of West Germany, at which time they would activate themselves once the forward line of Soviet troops had passed in order to carry out acts of sabotage and guerrilla warfare. On one occasion in 1971, a team was scouting penetration areas through the Berlin Wall when authorities in the British sector arrested them, though they were released a few hours later. Team One SCUBA found that moving through the canals by scuba proved an effective way to infiltrate and exfiltrate. Members of the unit were specifically selected from language-qualified soldiers, most of whom were former German and Eastern European immigrants serving through the Lodge-Philbin Act and seeking a "fast-track" to citizenship, some of whom included former Nazi soldiers, including members of the Waffen SS. Americans numbered only approximately 15 of the original group. Despite the presence of former Nazi soldiers, the unit was at one point commanded by Sidney Shachnow, a Jewish survivor of the Holocaust. A handful of the original members had participated in D-Day, while others had served in the Warsaw rebellion against the Nazis, the 1956 Hungarian revolution, and the Finnish underground during WWII.

The European soldiers taught their American teammates how to blend in as a local for undercover operations using local mannerisms to avoid Soviet countersurveillance. The soldiers were trained to communicate using common intelligence tradecraft measures such as dead drops, utilizing invisible ink, and running surveillance detection routes. They dressed in civilian clothing purchased in both West and East Germany, and carried false identification. Det A members had to blend in as civilians and work undercover in an environment saturated with enemy spies. Soldiers posed as gastarbeiter guest workers from Turkey or Greece; others utilized trade skills to gain union identity documents as plumbers, while one operator posed as a magician. According to Det A members, covert "load signals" (signs left by an intelligence asset for their handler indicating a desire to meet) were so common around the city that it was difficult for them to find places to mark for their own dead drops due to the sheer number of competing load signals; Det A began using paper markets instead of chalk to differentiate their signals from those of other spies. Some members carried one-shot cigarette-lighter guns known as "stingers". Other teams used diplomatic passports. Because of the extreme secrecy surrounding Detachment A's activities, the unit "remained in the shadows until history and discretion allowed a public accounting," as former U.S. Army Special Operations Command commander Lt. Gen. Charles Cleveland later observed. Due to the deep secrecy involved with their cover identities, incidents that risked any member's cover identity were cause for dismissal.

Maintaining clandestine radio communications in Berlin was also a challenge, with antennas and wires having to be disguised and camouflaged. In one incident, a six-man Det A team set up a radio in a hotel to send morse code signals, only to find that their wiring drew too much power and was dimming the entire structure's lights, causing the unit to abandon using hotel rooms for safehouses in the future.

=== Unconventional Warfare ===
The primary mission of Detachment A was to conduct clandestine unconventional warfare (UW) in the event of a war with the Soviet Union. Plans called for Det A's special forces teams to covertly cross into East Germany at the outbreak of hostilities and attack critical infrastructure and military targets. These targets included railways, communications networks, military headquarters, fuel depots, supply sites, utilities, and inland waterways. Such sabotage operations were intended to disrupt Warsaw Pact forces and buy time for the defense of West Berlin and Allied forces in Europe. In addition, Detachment A teams were tasked with organizing and training local guerrilla fighters drawn from the population, using pre-stockpiled caches of weapons, explosives, radios and funds hidden around Berlin. The theory was that a single 12-man Special Forces team could mobilize and lead a much larger resistance force in occupied territory if war erupted. Det A was at one point equipped with special coal that was filled with C-3 explosive for use in sabotaging the rail ring surrounding Berlin, as well as vials filled with metal shavings for the destruction of turbines. The unit was tasked by the CIA in 1978 with digging up old cache sites hidden around Berlin, to assess their condition and recommend replacements in case a stay-behind operation happened sometime in the future. These caches contained food, weapons, ammunition, and medical supplies that needed replacement as they hit expiration dates. In other instances, Det A was responsible for burying new caches, often under the ruse of setting up a temporary Special Forces company headquarters, where they would dig the hole from inside of a GP Medium tent. Det A received specialized training in extreme downhill and cross-country skiing, as well as specialized demolition training (including from the CIA's specialized demolition course at Harvey Point).

Detachment A members were responsible for choosing and developing their own targets across both East and West Berlin for sabotage, developing their own extraction plans and cover identities, and were expected to operate without support from the broader Special Forces community.

=== Counterterrorism and Special Operations ===
In the late 1960s and 1970s, Detachment A also assumed an important peacetime counterterrorism mission in response to emerging terrorist threats in Europe as part of OPLAN 0300. Initial focus was on countering Palestinian terrorism; eventually a team was assigned to track the Baader Meinhof gang which was also considered a terrorist threat in the area of operations. By the mid-1970's, Det A had developed specialized sniper and SWAT teams, as a result of U.S. European Command ordering the unit to prepare for counterterrorism operations, building on its expertise in urban unconventional warfare. Det A operators trained to intervene in hostage situations and other terrorist incidents, working discreetly with West German police and allied special mission units such as the GSG-9, the Berlin SEK, and Special Air Service. Det A developed a particularly close relationship with GSG-9 with early members training under GSG-9 commander Col. Ulrich "Ricky" Wegener. Other operators attended the Danish scout-swimmers course, the German Ranger School, and the Special Forces Operations and Intelligence course. Det A divers were also sent to a specialized combat diver course conducted by SEAL Team 2 in Crete, in which the team was certified on state-of-the-art indigenous Drager diving systems, which they then used to train German frogmen. Six other members were sent to FBI air crimes training in Quantico to develop counter-hijacking expertise. Operators trained on nonstandard equipment such as scoped Model 70 Winchester sniper rifles and Walther MPK submachineguns, and a C-147 was dedicated on standby.

==== Operation Eagle Claw ====
The unit's enhanced capabilities led to Detachment A's involvement in the planning and preparation for Operation Eagle Claw, the 1980 U.S. attempt to rescue American hostages in Tehran, Iran. The primary U.S. Army counterterrorism unit, Delta Force, had only recently been validated for operations and its two squadrons of operators were deemed insufficient for covering both the Iranian embassy compound, which spread over 27 acres, and simultaneously assaulting the Ministry of Foreign Affairs (MFA) building. Delta commander Charlie Beckwith had until then resisted involving an additional ground force, but the mission's realities forced his hand. An eight-man assault element of Det A members led by detachment commander LTC Stan Olchovic would infiltrate with Delta Force and rescue the hostages at the MFA location; they were supported by a two-man element of Det A undercover infiltrators providing eyes-on pre-mission reconnaissance operations in Tehran before exfiltrating and joining the assault team at the Delta Force staging ground for the rescue. The mission was planned under the codename Storm Cloud, and the two-man team successfully infiltrated Iran and conducted their initial reconnaissance, including at one point a Det A member photographing himself alongside an Iranian soldier in front of the MFA building. However the main rescue operation ultimately failed and was aborted before the assault team's direct engagement. Two other Det A members, Sergeants First Class Mike Mulieri and Don Ringley, were flown to Wadi Kena, Egypt, which was the initial staging ground for the hostage rescue mission. They were tasked with the contingency plan if needed to extract the Air Force combat controller and a CIA pilot who would be testing soil samples at a forward refueling point to see if they would support the intended aircraft weight. In the event of an emergency, Mulieri and Ringley would drop the Fulton recovery device onto Desert One to extract the combat controller, Major John Carney; if necessary by physically jumping into the site and then self-evading on foot into Pakistan. However, as Carney's mission was a success, their intervention was not required; they did, however, conduct an aerial reconnaissance of Desert One at an altitude of just 200 feet in which they determined that most of the Iranian air defenses had been turned off.

According to General Dick Potter, Beckwith's subsequent memoirs would later cause some embarrassment among the German government, as they exposed the close relationship between GSG-9 and Det A which was illegal under German law.

==== Dozier kidnapping ====
Det A was tasked with the American response to the Dozier kidnapping, but Italian police ended the situation before the detachment could deploy.

== Legacy ==
In January 2014, nearly 30 years after deactivation, a special commemorative stone was laid at Fort Bragg to honor Detachment A's valorous Cold War service, and the unit's long-hidden colors were officially retired in a ceremony attended by former members.

Det A's unique status under cover as part of the Berlin Brigade caused a historical anomaly with its unit colors. Unlike other SF units, whose colors are olive green, Det A's were "infantry blue" since they were technically part of the Berlin Brigade which was an infantry unit.

== See also ==
- Operation Gladio
- Office of Strategic Services (OSS)
- Blue Light
- Green Light Teams
- Delta Force
