= Special Patrol Insertion/Extraction =

Military technique

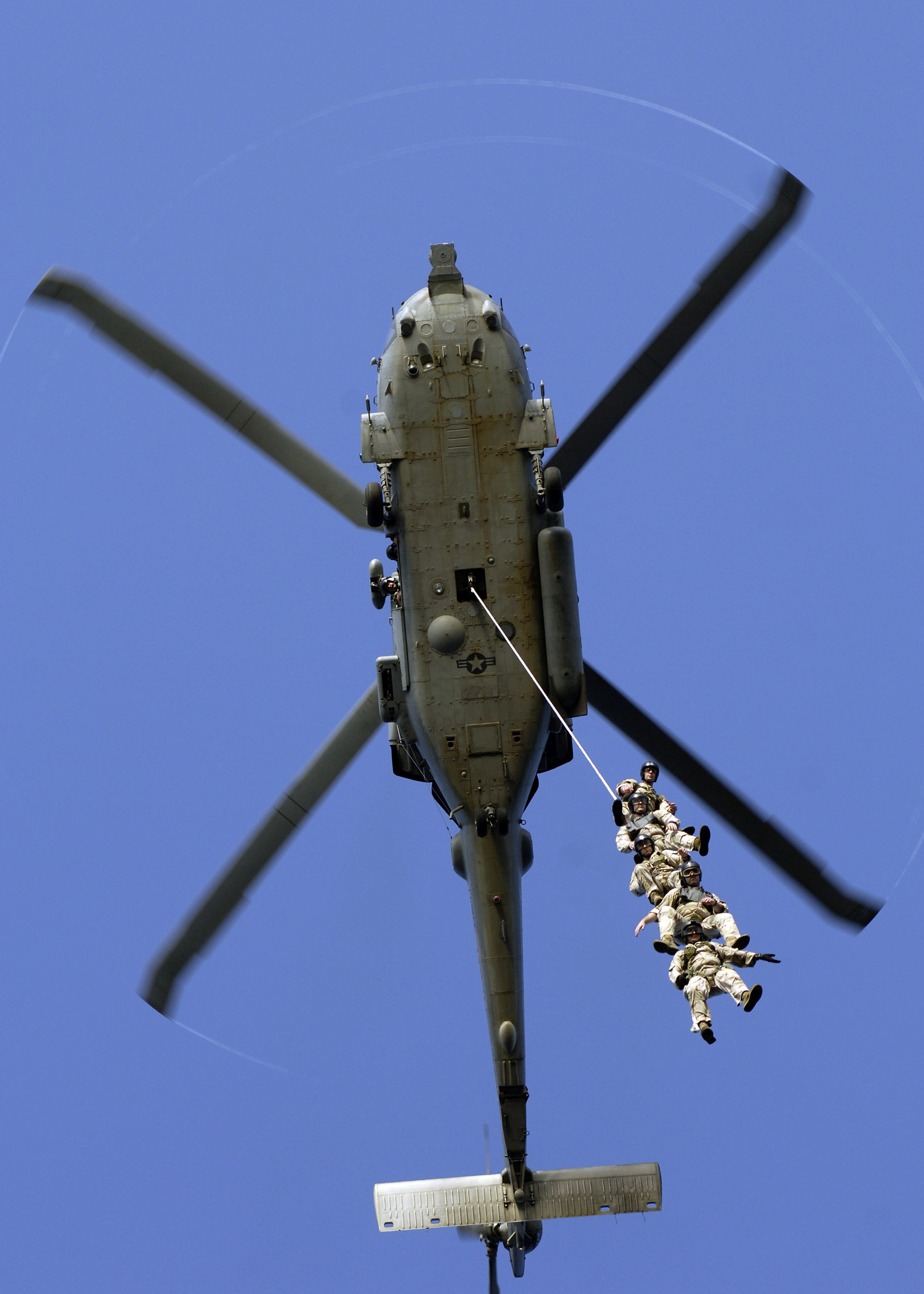
Personnel suspended from a Sikorsky SH-60 Seahawk for an SPIE operation

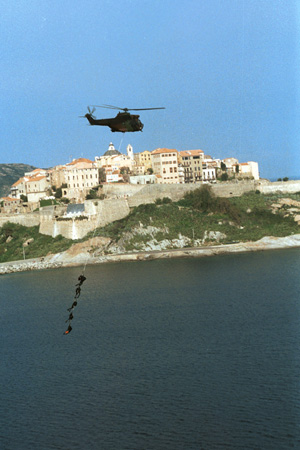
2nd Foreign Parachute Regiment Legionnaires extracting from an Aérospatiale SA 330 Puma

The Special Patrol Insertion/Extraction (SPIE) system was developed as a means to rapidly insert and/or extract a reconnaissance patrol from an area that does not permit a helicopter to land. SPIE has application for rough terrain as well as water inserts/extracts. It is an adaptation of the STABO rig.

Generally, the SPIE rope is lowered into the pickup area from a hovering helicopter. Patrol personnel, each wearing a harness with an attached carabiner, hook up to a D-ring inserted in the SPIE rope. A second safety line is attached to a second D-ring located above the first. The helicopter lifts vertically from an extract zone until the rope and personnel are clear of obstructions, then proceeds in forward flight to a secure insert zone. The rope and personnel are treated as an external load and airspeeds, altitudes, and oscillations must be monitored.

Early 2010s video of U.S. Marines flying over St. Louis, Missouri on an SPIE rig attached to a USMC CH-46 Sea Knight

The United States Coast Guard uses a similar technique to board ships when speed and stealth are required.

== History ==
The Special Personnel Insertion/Extraction was first designed by United States Marines of 1st Force Reconnaissance Company, the Marine division's 1st Reconnaissance Battalion, and the 1st Marine Aircraft Wing riggers. In 1969 they created and actively used several versions of the SPIE in combat before it was officially recommended to be tested. In May 1970, the commanding general of 3rd Marine Amphibious Force coordinated input from the 1st Marine Division and his 1st Marine Aircraft Wing. A request was sent to the Commandant of the Marine Corps and to the Development Center for certification of the SPIE rig and to its safety and use.

The parachute test jumpers of the Naval Parachute Unit (NPU) and Marine Corps, all qualified parachutist designers and engineers, assembled together at NAS El Centro for the initial testing and evaluation of the SPIE rig. After a few test dummies were tried, Marine Major Bruce F. Meyers, along with four Navy NPU parachutist engineers, successfully attempted the first flight on the current SPIE assembly.

== See also ==
- Fulton surface-to-air recovery system
- Helicopter Rope Suspension Technique
