= MIKE Force =

US paramilitary force in SE Asia

MIKE Force SSI

The Mobile Strike Force Command, or MIKE Force, was a key component of United States Army Special Forces in the Vietnam War. They served with indigenous soldiers selected and trained through the largely minority Civilian Irregular Defense Group (CIDG) and were led by American Special Forces and Australian Army Training Team Vietnam (AATTV) personnel. MIKE Force was a force multiplier, operating what is today called a foreign internal defense mission.

== History ==
United States Army Special Forces had been in South Vietnam since 1957; by 1964, over 1400 Green Berets were in-country, with their headquarters at Nha Trang. Their primary mission was to train and advise CIDG groups, many of whom were hostile to Viet Cong (VC) efforts to promote socialist revolution in the countryside.

In late 1964, there was increasing Viet Cong activity in the area surrounding Saigon, a zone officially controlled by the South Vietnamese III Corps; this suggested a need for CIDGs with more mobile capabilities, and able to move to encampments and villages under VC attack. Mike Force was established in summer 1965 as a direct outgrowth of "Eagle Flight" Detachment formed on October 16, 1964 to react to emergency combat situations at Special Forces camps in the western highlands. The first such force, known as "Mike Force" was named for Special Forces Lieutenant Colonel Miguel de la Pena. It was initially principally composed of Nung people, an ethnic group that had migrated from southern China in the 4th century. Many of the Nùng fighters were ex-French Foreign Legion. The name Mike Force later came to be applied to other locally recruited mobile forces that operated throughout South Vietnam. These organizations were later composed of Bahnar, Hmong, Nung, Jarai, and Khmer Krom minorities, and other members of the Degar peoples, also known as Montagnards.

Mike Force's missions were intended as multipurpose reaction units and to act as a country-wide quick reaction force for securing, reinforcing, and recapturing CIDG A Camps, as well as to conduct raids, special reconnaissance patrols. Mike Force also conducted operations gathering intelligence, disrupting/eradicating VC/NVA activities in remote areas, search and destroy missions and bomb damage assessments (BDA). Mike Forces were specifically designed for employment under short reaction time conditions and short duration missions, not prolonged combat engagements. The conventional unit alternative to Special Forces detachments like Mike Force was Tiger Force, which was primarily tasked with counter-guerrilla warfare against enemies from behind their lines that emphasized body-count rather than force multiplication.

Mike Force was active under 5th Special Forces Group, from 1965 to 1970, under the overall control of the U.S. Military Assistance Command Vietnam (MACV). Thereafter it came under ARVN control until 1974. It fought against the Viet Cong and People's Army of Vietnam (North Vietnamese Army) forces in various detachments. By 1968, each Corps Tactical Zone had a Mike Force assigned including Detachment B-16 Mobile Strike Force under I Corps, Detachment B-20 Mobile Strike Force at Pleiku for II Corps; Detachment B-36 Mobile Strike Force under III Corps; Detachment B-40 Mobile Strike Force under IV Corps. Detachment B-55 Mobile Strike Force based Nha Trang operating under Headquarters, 5th Special Forces Group for country wide missions. Each Mike Force was commanded by an A-Team detachment typically composed of two or three officers and 16-18 enlisted Army Special Forces soldiers. Each rifle company was commanded by a senior Special Forces soldier, usually a Master Sergeant or Sergeant First Class and assisted by two or three other SF soldiers including a medic. Mike Forces distinguished themselves in battle at locations such as the A Shau Valley, the Plei Trapp Valley, Nui Giai, Nui Coto, Duc Lap (see Duc Lap Camp), Nui Khet and others.

Nung people from Mike Force manned Hurricane Aircat airboats in the Mekong Delta under American Special Forces command starting in late 1966. One base was at the A-414 SF camp in Moc Hoa just south of the Cambodian border. There was an accidental incursion into Cambodia on November 20, 1966, involving these airboats, helicopter insertion of South Vietnamese troops and PACVs (hovercraft) that resulted in the deaths of 56 communist soldiers caught by surprise in the open. General Creighton Abrams, Commander MACV, arrived the following day for a debriefing. The King of Cambodia objected a week later.

Mike Force had a critical role in the search and rescue of downed American pilots because they were mobile and often in close proximity to the DMZ. MIKE Force also designated drop zones and landing zones, conducted bomb-damage assessments, called in air strikes on high-value targets, and collected intelligence during reconnaissance missions, much like the U.S. Long Range Reconnaissance Patrol (LRRP) forces.

In 1971 MIKE Force was disbanded during Vietnamization.

== See also ==
- Montagnard
- Kit Carson Scouts
- Vietnamese Rangers
- Civilian Irregular Defense Group program
- Detachment 101
- Project DELTA
- Project GAMMA
- LRRPs
- Operation Phoenix
- MACV
- Tiger Force
- Role of United States in the Vietnam War
