= STABO =

Military extraction harness device

The STABO (STAbilized BOdy) extraction harness was a device which allowed military personnel to be rescued (by helicopter) from field locations which prevented the conventional landing and boarding of a helicopter.

It was designed and developed by U.S. Army Special Forces personnel stationed in Vietnam during the Vietnam War, and became a widely used and highly successful extraction device employed during the Vietnam War.

== History ==
Sergeant First Class Clifford L. Roberts, U.S. Army, Special Forces, drew up the first design on a napkin, after a wounded Special Forces Soldier fell out of a McGuire extraction rig, during a combat extraction mission. SFC Roberts used the unit's parachute loft, and made the first prototype on the sewing machines used to service and repair parachutes. He was then sent to present the design. The design was approved and 500 rigs were ordered. SFC Roberts was awarded a Bronze Star for the design. SFC Roberts was not the only one involved in the design, invention and manufacture of the first STABO harness, there was also a Major Robert L. Stevens and Captain John D. H. Knabb.

The STABO harness/rig was a machine-stitched, skeletonized harness, very similar to that of a standard parachute harness. The harness webbing was made of heavy duty nylon, identical to the type used in the manufacture of parachute harnesses. The STABO rig served two main functions: it was itself an extraction harness and also served as the base for the operator's load-bearing equipment in the field. Later versions of the STABO harness were made in small, medium and large sizes.

== Use ==
To ready a STABO harness for rope extraction, the two leg straps (normally folded and stowed during ground operations (secured by utility tape or rubber bands)) were freed from the back of the harness, routed up between the legs, and each leg strap was then snapped onto a V ring, with one mounted on each lower front waist of the harness. A standard issue LBE pistol belt was laced through the center sections of the rig, and fastened around the operator's waist, which served as the main closure device for the overall rig on the operator.

The operator was extracted using a dual rope (or strap) 'Y' design system (one per each STABO rig), lowered by a helicopter. Each strap end typically retained a large carabiner fastener, which was clipped to a large V or D ring permanently attached to each upper shoulder strap of the rig. Once both carabiners were attached to the upper V/D rings on the rig, the operator could then be lifted out vertically by the helicopter. (This extraction method was often referred to informally as the "strings" method.)

The STABO rig was far more secure, safe and comfortable than the McGuire rig, and perhaps most importantly, it allowed the unrestricted use of the operator's hands, to operate any weapons during the frequently 'hot' extractions from a combat landing or pickup zone. Further, the rig was equally effective if an operator was wounded or unconscious.

As the STABO rig was used as the base for operator's personal LBE harness, it was worn for the full duration of the combat operation, in which to allow for rapid extraction by the rope ("strings") method, if a conventional helicopter LZ could not be quickly established (which was frequently experienced in Southeast Asia, as reconnaissance teams were operating deep in heavily forested enemy territory).

The current US Military method for extracting troops using the helicopter rope method is the Special Patrol Insertion/Extraction (SPIE) system, a direct and close descendant of the STABO rig system that was developed and pioneered in Vietnam/SEA.

== See also ==
- Fulton surface-to-air recovery system
- Special Patrol Insertion/Extraction (SPIE)
