= Project GAMMA =

US special forces unit (1967–70) active in Cambodia during the Vietnam War

PROJECT GAMMA US Army
- Active: 1968–1970
- Country: United States of America
- Branch: United States Army
- Type: Covert Operations
- Role: Intelligence
- Size: Detachment, 6 US, 460 Indigenous personnel
- Part of: 5th SFGA RVN 1968–70; US Army Special Forces SSI c. 1970
- Engagements: Vietnam War (Cambodia)

Project GAMMA was the name given in 1968 to Detachment B-57, Company E (Special Operations), 5th Special Forces Group (Airborne) (5th SFG(A)) in Vietnam from 1967 to 1970. Project Gamma was one of several special reconnaissance (SR) units named with a Greek letter. The Reconnaissance Projects were formed by the U.S. Military Assistance Command, Vietnam (MACV) during the Vietnam War to collect operational intelligence in remote areas of South Vietnam. It was responsible for covert intelligence collection operations in Cambodia. The teams were highly effective at locating Viet Cong operations in Cambodia, leading to their destruction. When assets (informants) began to disappear, they identified a South Vietnamese officer as the mole. On the advice of the CIA, they took extrajudicial steps and murdered him. Seven officers and one non-commissioned officer were arrested and tried. When the CIA refused to answer summons for witnesses for national security reasons, the charges were dropped.

== History ==
Detachment B-57 arrived in South Vietnam in June 1967. On 26 February 1968 it was moved from Saigon to Nha Trang and it received the designation Project GAMMA on 1 April 1968, in conjunction with other special forces units such as Project DELTA (Detachment B-52), responsible for special reconnaissance. Members of the detachment operated from nine sites under the cover of civil affairs and psychological operations offices.^{196}

=== Operational authority ===
The teams did not report up the normal military chain of command. Members of Project GAMMA were military but they were only nominally under the chain of command of the 5th SFG(A). Instead, they received operational orders from the CIA Station Chief in Saigon and through the agency's satellite office in Nha Trang.

As a result, there was rivalry and friction between Army General Creighton Abrams' senior officers and the officers leading GAMMA. Many of the best and brightest NCOs chose to go to the expanding Special Forces units rather than the conventional army.

=== Mission and purpose ===
U.S. politicians in Washington D.C. had granted Cambodia and Laos “protected status” and US troops were not officially allowed across the border from Vietnam. The North Vietnamese Army (NVA) took advantage of this and placed units up to division size immediately across the border. These forces were free for much of the war to attack into South Vietnam and return to their bases in Cambodia to refit and rearm without fear of attack.

Project Gamma changed that situation. It was responsible for obtaining intelligence targeting the North Vietnamese activities and camps in Cambodia supporting both regular and irregular units of the People's Army of Vietnam (PAVN). Colonel Robert B. Rheault commanded a combined force of Green Berets and South Vietnamese commandos who entered Cambodia to gather intelligence and destroy Communist infiltration, transportation, and storage sites.

When Project GAMMA identified a target that was too big for them to hit, B-52 bombers struck those sites in violation of the guarantee of security the US gave to those neighboring countries. The U.S. dropped more than two million tons of bombs on neutral Laos, equivalent to a planeload of ordnance every eight minutes, 24 hours a day. That single campaign exceeded the total bomb tonnage dropped on Germany and Japan combined throughout World War II.

=== Operational success ===
Rheault oversaw five teams and 98 codenamed agents. It was the most successful intelligence net of the war. Project Gamma used members of the Khmer Serei and the Khmer Kampuchean Krom in its activities inside Cambodia. The top intelligence officer on General Abrams' staff stated in October 1968 that Project GAMMA was providing 65 percent of the known data on PAVN base camps and strengths in Cambodia as well as 75 percent of the same data on South Vietnam.

Historian Shelby Stanton wrote that by early 1969 Detachment B-57 "had developed into the finest and most productive intelligence-collection operation the United States had in Southeast Asia". Stanton and others attributed this success to the fact that South Vietnamese intelligence were kept in the dark about the unit's operations including those conducted by the detachment's indigenous agents.^{196} The South Vietnamese intelligence apparatus was a sieve that had been infiltrated by many North Vietnamese agents.

One source claims GAMMA was responsible for intelligence operations against Prince Norodom Sihanouk.

=== Death of Chu Van Thai Khac ===
In early 1969 some of Detachment B-57's assets (human sources of information) started to disappear. The detachment's leadership concluded that its intelligence staff had been compromised by a mole.^{196} Rheault had been in command of the 5th Group for only a few weeks when the suspected spy was uncovered.

In the spring of 1969, a MACV-SOG reconnaissance team operating in Cambodia captured photos showing Chu Van Thai Khac (AKA Thai Khac Chuyen), a South Vietnamese GAMMA agent, meeting with North Vietnamese intelligence officers. Sergeant Alvin Smith, who had been Chuyen's handler, identified Chuyen in the photos.

Chuyen was subsequently arrested and interrogated for ten days. Polygraph tests indicated that he was a double agent working with the Viet Cong.^{197} They also suspected he had been informing the South Vietnamese government, which meant that if they released him, the government might protect Chuyen and that he might walk free.

Various ways of dealing with Chuyen were discussed within Detachment B-57, including possibly killing him. While the 5th Special Forces Group's executive officer strongly opposed killing Chuyen, the detachment's commander and operations officer met with the CIA headquarters in Saigon. The soldiers reported that the CIA suggested that "elimination ... might be the best course of action".^{197}

On 20 June 1969, three officers assigned to Project GAMMA drugged Chuyen, took him out on a boat into Nha Trang Bay, shot him twice in the head, weighed his body down with chains, and dumped his body into the South China Sea. A cover story claiming that Chuyen had failed to return on a mission that was a test of his loyalty was later approved by the 5th Special Forces Group's commanded by Rheault.

Sergeant Smith, Chuyen's handler, was not a member of Special Forces, but an Army intelligence specialist. Smith had failed to follow protocol when recruiting Chuyen. He had failed to require Chuyen to take a polygraph test that might have revealed why Chuyen spoke fluent English, was from North Vietnam and had family there, and had worked for a number of U.S. outfits and left them all in turmoil.

=== Soldiers tried ===
Smith became concerned for his safety and sought sanctuary with the CIA in Nha Trang. The CIA alerted the Army's Criminal Investigation Division, who granted him immunity. Smith revealed that Chuyen had been killed and identified the Green Berets involved. General Abrams ordered all of the officers and men involved including Colonel Rheault arrested and confined to Long Binh Jail. All were charged with premeditated murder.^{198}

The trial was covered extensively by the media and became known as the Green Beret Affair. Information revealed during pre-trial preparation revealed that the CIA had ordered Chuyen to be "terminated with extreme prejudice" which entered the public lexicon as a euphemism for "execute". The CIA issued a statement denying they knew of Chuyen when the soldiers asked them for input and that they strongly urged the Green Berets not to kill him.

The Army defense lawyers for the eight soldiers summoned General Abrams and CIA officials as witnesses. All refused to testify on the grounds of national security. In September 1969 Secretary of the Army Stanley Resor announced that all charges would be dropped against the eight soldiers since the CIA refused to make its personnel available as witnesses, making a fair trial impossible.

Project GAMMA was deactivated on 31 March 1970. An official Army history of the Green Berets, published after the Vietnam War, does not mention Project GAMMA or Detachment B-57. Although the Pentagon has declassified much of the material about Green Beret operations inside Laos and Cambodia, as of 2007, nothing on Project GAMMA has been made available.

== See also ==
Other reconnaissance projects:

- Project DELTA
- Project SIGMA
- Project OMEGA
