= Special reconnaissance =

Intelligence gathering discipline

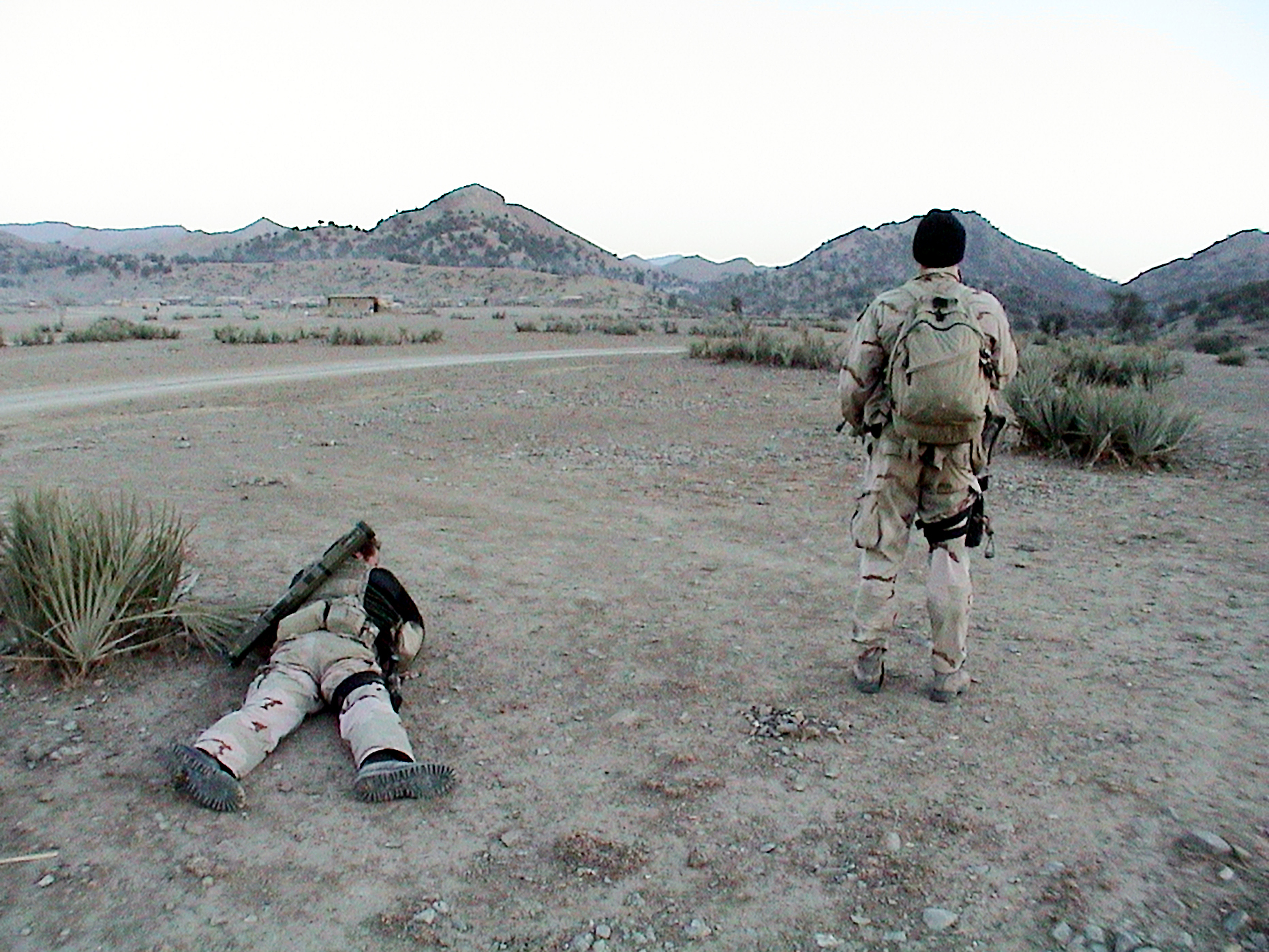
US Navy SEALs conducting special reconnaissance in Afghanistan, 2002

Special reconnaissance (SR) is conducted by small units, such as a recon team, made up of highly trained military personnel, usually from special forces units and/or military intelligence organizations. Special reconnaissance teams operate behind enemy lines, avoiding direct combat and detection by the enemy. As a role, SR is distinct from commando operations, but both are often carried out by the same units. The SR role frequently includes covert direction of airstrikes and indirect fire, in areas deep behind enemy lines, placement of remotely monitored sensors, and preparations for other special forces. Like other special forces, SR units may also carry out direct action and unconventional warfare, including guerrilla operations.

In intelligence terms, SR is a human intelligence (HUMINT) collection discipline. Its operational control is likely to be inside a compartmented cell of the HUMINT, or possibly the operations, staff functions. Since such personnel are trained for intelligence collection as well as other missions, they will usually maintain clandestine communications to the HUMINT organization and will be systematically prepared for debriefing. They operate significantly farther forward than even the most forward friendly scouting and surveillance units.

In international law, SR is not regarded as espionage if combatants are in proper uniforms, regardless of formation, according to the Hague Convention of 1907, or the Fourth Geneva Convention of 1949. However, some countries do not honor these legal protections, as was the case with the Nazi "Commando Order" of World War II, which was held to be illegal at the Nuremberg Trials.

== History ==
While SR has been a function of armies since ancient times, specialized units with this task date from the lead-up to World War II.

In 1938, the British Secret Intelligence Service (MI6) and the War Office both set up special research departments: Section D and "Military Intelligence (Research)" to investigate possible sabotage and other ways to attack the enemy. These later merged in 1940 with the propaganda unit Department EH to form the basis of the Special Operations Executive (SOE), which would conduct irregular warfare operations in occupied Europe.

In 1941, during the North African Campaign volunteers from Allies formed, under the auspices of the British Army, the Long Range Desert Group for reconnaissance and raiding behind Italian lines and the Special Air Service a commando group.

In 1942, following the onset of the Pacific Theater of World War II, the Allied Intelligence Bureau, was set up in Australia. Drawing on personnel from Australian, British, New Zealand and other Allied forces, it included Coastwatchers and "special units" that undertook reconnaissance behind enemy lines.

During the Winter War (1939–40) and the Continuation War, which was the name of the Finnish theater of World War II active between 1941 and 1944, Finland employed several kaukopartio ("long range patrol") units.

The US Government established the Office of Strategic Services (OSS), modeled on the British SOE, in June 1942. Following the end of the war OSS became the basis for the CIA.

During the Vietnam War, respective division and brigades in-country trained their Long Range Reconnaissance Patrol members (now known as the Long Range Surveillance units). However, the US Army's 5th Special Forces Group with support from seconded Australian SASR and AATTV instructors, held an advanced course in the art of patrolling for potential Army and Marine team leaders at their Recondo School in Nha Trang, Vietnam, for the purpose of locating enemy guerrilla and main force North Vietnamese Army units, as well as artillery spotting, intelligence gathering, forward air control, and bomb damage assessment.

During the war on terror, the US Army began to develop a limited number of special reconnaissance platoons at the battalion level of conventional infantry units. These platoons were most often composed of Ranger-qualified soldiers and given selection of advanced training in order to allow them to work in close conjunction with Special Forces and US Government Agencies.

== Appropriate missions ==
Special forces units that perform SR are usually polyvalent, so SR missions may be intelligence gathering in support of another function, such as counter-insurgency, foreign internal defense (FID), guerrilla/unconventional warfare (UW), or direct action (DA).

Other missions may deal with locating targets and planning, guiding, and evaluating attacks against them.

Target analysis could go in either place. If air or missile strikes are delivered after the SR team leaves the AO, the SR aspect is intelligence, but if the strikes are to be delivered and possibly corrected and evaluated by the SR team, the SR mission is fires-related.

=== Intelligence-related missions ===
Every SR mission will collect intelligence, even incidentally. Before a mission, SR teams will usually study all available and relevant information on the area of operations (AO). On their mission, they then confirm, amplify, correct, or refute this information.

Assessment, whether by clandestine SR or overt study teams, is a prerequisite for other special operations missions, such as UW or FID. DA or counter-terror (CT), usually implies clandestine SR.

==== Hydrographic, meteorological and geographic reconnaissance ====
Mission planners may not know if a given force can move over a specific route. These variables may be hydrographic, meteorological, or geographic. SR teams can resolve trafficability or fordability, or locate obstacles or barriers.

MASINT (measurement and signature intelligence) sensors exist for most of these requirements. The SR team can place remotely-operated weather instrumentation. Portable devices to determine the depth and bottom characteristics of waters are readily available as commercial fishing equipment or more sophisticated devices specific to military naval operations.

Remote-viewing MASINT sensors to determine the trafficability of a beach are experimental. Sometimes, simple observation or use of a penetrometer or weighted cone that measures how deeply weights will sink into the surface are needed. These however have to be done at the actual site. Beach measurements are often assigned to naval SR units like the United States Navy SEALs or United Kingdom's Special Boat Service.

Beach and shallow water reconnaissance, immediately before an amphibious landing is considered direct support to the invasion, not SR. SR would determine if a given beach is suitable for any landing, well before the operational decision to invade.

There is a blurred line between SR and direct action in support of amphibious operations when an outlying island is captured, with the primary goal of using it as a base for surveillance and support functions. Despite being a large scale operation by SR standards, an early example is the attack by elements of the 77th Infantry Division on Kerama Retto before the main battle. Operation Trudy Jackson, which involved the capture of Yeongheungdo, an island in the mouth of the harbor before the Battle of Inchon, by a joint CIA/military team led by Navy LT Eugene Clark is much more in the SR/DA realm. Clark apparently led numerous SR and DA operations during the Korean War, some of which may still be classified.

==== IMINT (imagery intelligence) ====
Basic photography and sketching is usually a skill for any individual performing an SR mission. More advanced photographic technique may require additional training or attaching specialists to a team.

Lightweight unmanned aerial vehicles with imagery and other intelligence collection capabilities are potentially useful for SR, since small UAVs have low observability. SR team members can be trained to use them, or specialists can be attached to a team. The UAV may transmit what it sees, using one or more sensors, either to the SR team or a monitoring headquarters. Potential sensors include stabilized and highly magnified photography, low-light television, thermal imagers and imaging radar. Larger UAVs, which could be under the operational control of the SR team, could use additional sensors including portable acoustic and electro-optical systems.

==== SIGINT (signals intelligence) and EW (electronic warfare) ====
If there is a ground SIGINT requirement deep behind enemy lines, an appropriate technical detachment may be attached to the SR element. For SIGINT operations, the basic augmentation to United States Marine Corps Force Reconnaissance (Force Recon) is a 6-man detachment from a Radio Reconnaissance Platoon. There is a SIGINT platoon within the Intelligence Company of the new Marine Special Operations Support Group.

Army Special Forces (SF) have Special Operations Team-Alpha that can operate with an SF team, or independently. This low-level collection team typically has four men. Their primary equipment is the AN/PRD-13 SOF SIGINT Manpack System (SSMS), with capabilities including direction-finding capability from 2 MHz to 2 GHz, and monitoring from 1 to 1400 MHz. SOT-As also are able to exploit computer networks, and sophisticated communications systems.

The British 18 (UKSF) Signal Regiment provides SIGINT personnel, including from the 264 (SAS) Signals Squadron and SBS Signals Squadron to provide specialist SIGINT, secure communications, and information technology augmentation to operational units. They may be operating in counterterror roles in Iraq in the joint UK/US Task Force Black.

If the unit needs to conduct offensive clandestine electronic warfare, any electronic countermeasures (ECM) devices are usually operated remotely, either by the SR force or, preferably, by remote electronic warfare personnel after the SR team leaves the area.

==== MASINT (measurement and signature intelligence) and remote surveillance ====
Passive MASINT sensors can be used tactically by the SR mission. SR personnel also may place unmanned MASINT sensors like seismic, magnetic, and other personnel or vehicle detectors for subsequent remote use. Remote sensing is generally understood to have begun with US operations against the Laotian section of the Ho Chi Minh trail, in 1961. Under CIA direction, Lao nationals were trained to observe and photograph traffic on the Trail. This produced quite limited results, and, in 1964, Project LEAPING LENA parachuted in teams of Vietnamese Montagnards led by Vietnamese Special Forces.

The very limited results from LEAPING LENA led to two changes. First, Project DELTA (LEAPING LENA's replacement), used US-led SR teams. Second, these Army teams worked closely with Forward Air Controllers (FAC) which were instrumental in directing US air attacks by fighter-bombers as well as strategic bombing via BARREL ROLL in northern Laos and Operation STEEL TIGER in southern Laos. While the FACs immediately helped, air-ground cooperation improved significantly with the use of remote geophysical MASINT sensors, although MASINT had not yet been coined as a term.

The original sensors, a dim ancestor of today's technologies, started with air-delivered sensors under Operation Igloo White, such as air-delivered Acoubuoy and Spikebuoy acoustic sensors. These cued monitoring aircraft, which sent the data to a processing center in Thailand, from which target information was sent to the DELTA teams.

Closer to today's SR-emplaced sensors was the Mini-Seismic Intrusion Detector (MINISID). Unlike other sensors employed along the trail, it was specifically designed to be hand delivered and implanted. The MINISID and its smaller version the MICROSID were personnel detection devices often used in combination with the magnetic intrusion detector (MAGID). Combining sensors in this way improved the ability of individual sensors to detect targets and reduced false alarms. Today's AN/GSQ-187 Improved Remote Battlefield Sensor System (I-REMBASS) is a passive acoustic sensor which, with other MASINT sensors, detects vehicles and humans on a battlefield. It is routine for SR units to emplace such sensors both for regional monitoring by higher headquarters' remote sensing centers, as well as for tactical intelligence during the mission, as they are an improvement over tripwires and other improvised warnings.

Passive acoustic sensors provide additional measurements that can be compared with signatures and used to complement other sensors. For example, a ground search radar may not be able to differentiate between a tank and a truck moving at the same speed but adding acoustic information may quickly help differentiate them.

==== TECHINT (technical intelligence) ====
Capture of enemy equipment for TECHINT analysis is a standard SR mission. Capture of enemy equipment for examination by TECHINT specialists may be a principal part of SR patrols and larger raids, such as the World War II Operation Biting raid on Saint-Jouin-Bruneval, France which captured a German Würzburg radar and a German radar technician. Not uncommon for such operations, a technical specialist (radar engineer Flight Sergeant C.W.H. Cox) was attached to this SR unit. Sometimes technical specialists without SR training have taken their first parachute jump on TECHINT-oriented SR missions. Cox instructed the team in what to take and, if it could not be moved, what to photograph. Cox had significant knowledge of British radar, and conflicting reports say that the force was under orders to kill him rather than let him be captured. This likely was an after-the-action rumor, as Cox was a technician. The true radar expert, Don Preist, could not be captured as he stayed offshore but was in communications with the raiders. Preist also had ELINT equipment to gain information on the radar.

A mixture of SR, DA, and seizing opportunities characterized the Sayeret Matkal's Operation Rooster 53, originally planned as a mission to locate and disable a radar. It turned into an opportunity to capture the radar and, despite overloading the helicopter on its return trip, they were able to bring the entire radar back for TECHINT analysis.

==== Specific data collection ====
SR teams may be assigned to observe and measure specific information at a site or enemy facility for future operations. Regular ground forces, for example, might need a road and bridge surveyed to know whether heavy vehicles can cross it. The SR may be able to confirm this. An engineering specialist, preferably from a special operations organization may need to augment the team.

SR commanders need to ensure such missions cannot be performed by organic reconnaissance elements of a maneuver force commander supported by the SR organization or other supporting reconnaissance services such as IMINT.

For example, during the Falklands War of 1982, UK Special Air Service delivered eight 4-man patrols via helicopter deep into enemy-held territory up to 20 miles (32 km) from their hide sites several weeks before the main conventional force landings. Each man carried equipment needed for up to 25 days due to resupply limitations (cf. the 7-day limits of conventional LRS patrols discussed above). These patrols surveyed major centers of enemy activity. The patrols reconnoitered Argentinian positions at night, and then due to the lack of cover moved to distant observation posts (OPs). Information gathered was relayed to the fleet by secure radio which was still vulnerable to SIGINT which could locate their OPs. No common understanding of the threat of Argentine direction finding existed, and different teams developed individual solutions. The value of the information and the stress on the SR teams were tremendous. Their activities helped the force, limited in its sensors, develop an accurate operational picture of the opposition.

=== Offensive missions ===
SR units can engage targets of opportunity, but current doctrine emphasizes avoiding direct engagement, concentrating instead on directing air (e.g., GAPS (Ground-Aided Precision Strikes) and CAS (Close Air Support)), artillery, and other heavy fire support onto targets. The doctrine of bringing increasingly more accurate and potent firepower has evolved significantly since the early days of Vietnam.

SR units are trained in target analysis which combines both engineer reconnaissance and special forces assessment to identify targets for subsequent attack by fire support, conventional units, or special operations (i.e., direct action or unconventional warfare behind enemy lines). They evaluate targets using the "CARVER" mnemonic:

- Criticality: How important, in a strategic context, is the target? What effect will its destruction have on other elements of the target system? Is it more important to have real-time surveillance of the target (e.g., a road junction) than its physical destruction?
- Accessibility: Can an SR team reach or sense the target, keep it under surveillance for the appropriate time, and then exfiltrate after the target is struck?
- Recuperability: When the target is destroyed by fire support or direct action, in the case of DA missions, can the enemy repair, replace, or bypass it quickly using minimum resources? If so, it may not be a viable target.
- Vulnerability: do SR (including DA) and supporting units have the capability to destroy the target?
- Effect: Beyond pure military effect what are the political, economic, legal, and psychological effects of destroying the target? How would the attack affect local civilians?
- Recognizability: Can the target be recognized clearly, by SR and attack forces, under the prevailing weather, light, and in its terrain? If there are critical points within the target, they also must be recognizable by the means of destruction used.

==== Target acquisition ====
There are some differences between general and SR processes of target acquisition: conventional units typically identify targets that directly affect the performance of their mission, while SR target acquisition may be of a much wider scope and include identifying enemy locations or resources of strategic significance. Examples of difficult strategic targets included Ho Chi Minh trail infrastructures and logistic concentrations, and the Scud hunt during Operation Desert Storm.

SR units detect, identify, and locate targets to be engaged by lethal or nonlethal attack systems under the control of higher headquarters. SR also provides information on weather, obscuring factors such as terrain masking and camouflage, friendly or civilian presence in the target area, and other information that will be needed in targeting by independent attack systems.

During Operation Desert Storm, the US senior commanders, Colin Powell and Norman Schwarzkopf were opposed to using SOF ground troops to search for Iraqi mobile SCUD launchers. However, the senior British officer of the Coalition, Peter de la Billière, himself a former SAS commander, was well-disposed to use the SAS for such SR and did so. With additional Israeli pressure to send its own SOF teams into western Iraq, US Secretary of Defense Dick Cheney proposed using US SR teams to complement the SAS efforts.

On February 7, US SR teams joined British teams in the hunt for mobile Scud launchers. Open sources contain relatively little operational information about U.S. SOF activities in western Iraq. Some basic elements have emerged, however. Operating at night, Air Force MH-53J Pave Low and Army MH-47E helicopters would ferry SOF ground teams and their specially equipped four-wheel-drive vehicles from bases in Saudi Arabia to Iraq. The SOF personnel would patrol during the night and hide during the day. When targets were discovered, Air Force Combat Control Teams attached to the SR teams would communicate these targets over secure radios to AWACS.

==== Directing fire support ====
SR, going back to Vietnam, was far more potent when it directed external firepower onto the target rather than engaging it with its own weapons. Early coordination between SR and air support in Vietnam depended on visual and voice communications, without any electronics to make the delivery precise. SR teams could throw colored smoke grenades as a visual reference, but they needed to be in dangerously close range to the enemy to do so. A slightly improved method involved their directing a Forward Air Controller aircraft to fire marking rockets onto the target, but the method was fraught with error.

In Vietnam, the support was usually aircraft-delivered, although in some cases the target might be in range of artillery. Today, the distance to which SR teams penetrate will usually be out of the range of artillery, but ground-launched missiles might support them. In either case, directing any support relies on one of two basic guidance paradigms:

- Go-Onto-Target (GOT) for moving targets,
- Go-Onto-Location-in-Space (GOLIS) for fixed targets

For close air support, the assumption had been that rapidly changing tactical situations, including sudden changes in geometry between friendly forces and the target, GOT was preferred. If the attack was to be guided from the ground, the target would be directly targeted in some manner, such as a laser designator.

==== Post-strike reconnaissance ====
Post-strike reconnaissance, also called bomb damage assessment (BDA) is the visual, photographic, and/or electronic surveillance of a target that has been attacked to measure results. SR units carry out these missions when no other capabilities, such as conventional ground forces, local scouts and aviation, UAVs and other systems under the control of higher headquarters, or national-level intelligence collection capabilities can obtain the needed information.

== Operational techniques ==
An SR team's mission is not to engage in direct combat. It may be to observe and report, or it may include directing air or artillery attacks on enemy positions. If the latter is the case, the patrol still tries to stay covert; ideally, the enemy will know they are being attacked, but not know who is directing the fires.

While it is rare for a single man to do a special reconnaissance mission, it does happen. More commonly, the smallest unit is a two-man sniper team. Snipers are skilled in concealment and observation, and can carry out pure reconnaissance missions. The US Marine Corps often detaches sniper teams organic to combat units, to establish clandestine observation posts.

Marine Force Recon Greenside Operations are those in which combat is not expected. US Army Special Forces SR operations commonly are built around 12-man "A detachments" or 6-man "split A detachments" and US Army Long Range Surveillance Teams are 6-man teams. UK Special Air Service operations utilize four-man units.

SR units are well armed, since they may have to defend themselves if they are detected and their exfiltration support will need time to reach them. During the 1991 Gulf War, British SAS and United States Army and Air Force Special Operations Forces (AFSOC) units were originally sent behind enemy lines to find mobile Iraqi Scud tactical ballistic missile launchers and direct airstrikes onto them. When air support was delayed, however, the patrols might attack key Scud system elements with their own weapons and explosives.

While there are obvious risks to doing so, SR-trained units can operate out of uniform. They may use motorcycles, four-wheel-drive vehicles, or multiple helicopter lifts in their area of operations, or have mountaineering or combat swimming capability. Most SR units are trained in advanced helicopter movement and at least basic parachuting; some SR will have HAHO and HALO advanced parachute capability.

SR will have more organic support capabilities, including long-range communications, possibly signals intelligence, and other means of collecting technical intelligence, and usually at least one skilled medical technician whose proficiency is greater than basic first aid.

All these organizations have special operations roles, with SR often being performed by specialists within an organization. Certain organizations are tasked for a response involving areas contaminated by chemical weapons, biological agents, or radioactivity.

Since reconnaissance is a basic military skill, "special" reconnaissance refers to the means of operating in the desired area, and the nature of the mission. In US Army doctrine, there are five basic factors:

- Physical distances: The area of operations may be well beyond the forward line of troops, and require special skills to reach the area.
- Political considerations: Clandestine insertion also may be a requirement. If there is a requirement to work with local personnel, language skills and political awareness may be critical.
- Availability of required special skills and expertise: The most basic requirement for SR is to be able to remain unobserved, which may take special skills and equipment. If there is a requirement to collect intelligence, skills anywhere from advanced photography to remote sensor operation may be required.
- Threat capabilities: This usually relates to the need to stay clandestine, potentially against an opposing force with sophisticated intelligence capabilities. Such capabilities may be organic to a force or be available from a sponsoring third country.
- Follow-on special forces missions: This is the concept of preparing for other functions, such as Unconventional Warfare (UW) (i.e., guerrilla) or Foreign Internal Defense (FID) (i.e. counter-guerrilla) operations.

=== Infiltration ===
Special reconnaissance teams, depending on training and resources, may enter the area of operations in many ways. They may stay behind, where the unit deliberately stays hidden in an area that is expected to be overrun by advancing enemy forces. They may infiltrate by foot if the enemy does not have full view of his own lines and skilled soldiers may penetrate those front lines. Such movement is most often by night.

They may have mechanical help on the ground, such as tactical four-wheel-drive vehicles (e.g., dune buggies or long-wheelbase Land Rovers) or motorcycles. The British Special Air Service were pioneers in vehicle SR, going back to their operations in North Africa during World War II. In Desert Storm, US SR forces used medium and heavy helicopters to transport ground vehicles for the Scud Hunt.

SR units may use animals as pack animals or for riding. US Army Special Forces rode on horseback when working alongside the Afghan Northern Alliance.

SR units may also be transported by air. They can travel by helicopter and disembark by fast roping, ladder, or other techniques. Helicopters may make a series of touchdowns; the SR team will disembark on one of the touchdowns while the others are meant to mislead the enemy. Alternatively, they can parachute; HALO or HAHO can be used to reduce the risk of discovery.

Appropriately trained and equipped SR personnel can infiltrate by water as well. Boats may be delivered by surface ship or even helicopter. Another option is underwater movement, by swimming or delivery vehicle, from a submarine or an offshore surface ship. Some highly trained troops, such as United States Navy SEALs or British Special Boat Service may parachute into open water and swim to the target.

=== Support ===
Units on short missions may carry their own supplies but longer missions may require resupply. Typically, SR units are familiar with the area of operations and are comfortable with local food if necessary. Radio transmission, when necessary, are kept as short and precise as possible as even the most secure radios can be detected and located. One way of shortening messages is to define a set of codes, typically two-letter, for various prearranged packages of equipment. Those starting with "A" might be for ammunition, "F" for food, and "M" for medical. Burst transmission may also be used to prevent detection.

When long-range or long-duration patrols need resupply, a variety of techniques are used, though each have tradeoffs in security, resupply platform range and stealth, and the type and amount of resupply needed. As with infiltration, helicopters may make a number of quick touchdowns, all but one meant to mislead the enemy. If it is reasonably certain that the enemy knows some patrols are present, the helicopters may even make some touchdowns more easily observed, but leave boobytrapped supplies.

SR teams may need to have wounded personnel replaced or evacuated. In some extreme situations, wounded personnel who cannot travel may be killed by their own side, to avoid capture and interrogation which could compromise the special reconnaissance mission. Killing wounded personnel is described as a feature of Soviet and Russian Spetsnaz doctrine. A variant described for US personnel was explained to a US forward air controller, by a MACV SOG officer,

"If I decide that there's no way we can effect your rescue [in Cambodia], I'll order the gunships to fire at you to prevent the enemy from getting their hands on you. I can't risk having any of the [recon] teams compromised if they take you alive."

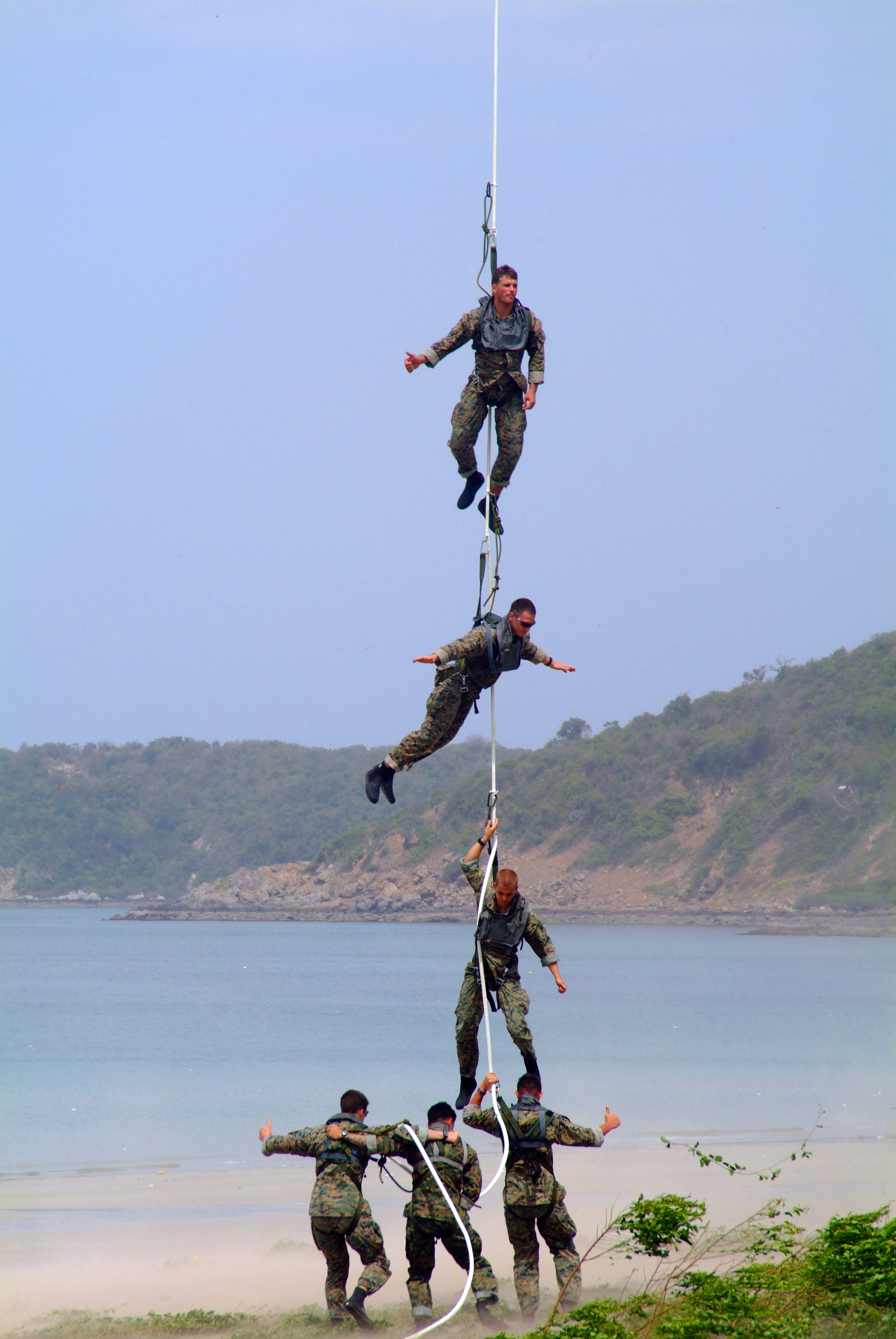
US Marines from 3rd Reconnaissance Battalion practicing Special Purpose Insert and Extraction (SPIE), 2006.

=== Exfiltration ===
Most of the same methods used to infiltrate may be used to exfiltrate. Stay-behind forces may wait until friendly forces arrive in their area.

One of the more common means of exfiltration is by special operations helicopters. There are a number of techniques that do not require the helicopter to land, including ladders, the McGuire rig, STABO rig, and SPIE rig. Small helicopters, such as the MH-6, have benches outside the cabin, which trained soldiers can quickly jump onto.

== Communications and electronics ==
Modern electronics have redefined communication for SR teams. Human-to-human electronics, however, are not the only critical advance. Navigational systems such as GPS have immense value. Laser rangefinders and designators can pinpoint the exact location of a target for fire support. Strong encryption, electronic counter-countermeasures, and techniques, like burst transmission, aid in reducing the chance of being located.

Current trends in secure communications for SR patrols to carry are based on the evolving concept of software-defined radio. The immensely flexible Joint Tactical Radio System (JTRS) is deployed with NATO special operations units, and can provide low-probability-of-intercept encrypted communications between ground units, from ground to aircraft, or from ground to satellite. It allows an SR team to use the same radio to operate on several networks and reduces the number of spare radios needed. By comparison, some of the raiders on the Vietnam War era Son Tay raid carried as many as five radios.

JTRS also closely integrates with target designators so that a separate radio is not required to communicate with precision-guided munition launchers. The availability of man-portable UAVs which can be launched by an SR team and communicated with may result in fundamentally new tactical doctrines.

Software-defined radio, along with standard information exchange protocols such as JTIDS Link 16, are enabling appropriate communications and situation awareness, reducing the chance of fratricide, across multiple military services. For example, an Air Force Situation Awareness Data Link (SADL) device that communicates between close air support aircraft can also exchange mission data with Army Enhanced Position Location Reporting System (EPLRS) equipment. The same basic equipment also interconnects EPLRS ground units.

== Reporting during and after the mission ==
Debriefing may be done by a unit's HUMINT officers, who are most familiar with their information-gathering techniques. Information from SR patrols is likely to contribute to HUMINT collection, but, depending on the mission, may also contribute to IMINT, TECHINT, SIGINT, and MASINT. Some of those techniques may be extremely sensitive and held on a need-to-know basis within the special reconnaissance organization and the all-source intelligence cell.

SR personnel generally report basic information, which may be expressed with the "SALUTE" mnemonic

- Size
- Activity
- Location
- Unit
- Time
- Equipment

They will provide map overlays, photography, and, if available, sensor data. SR troops are also trained in more advanced reporting, such as preparing multiple map overlays of targets, lines of communications, civilian and friendly concentrations, etc. They can perform target analysis and also graph various activities on a polar chart centered either on an arbitrary reference or on the principal target.

== Example units ==
Many countries have units with an official special reconnaissance role, including:

Australia:

- Special Air Service Regiment
- 2nd Commando Regiment

Bangladesh:

- SWADS
- 1st Para-Commando Battalion

Brazil:

- Brazilian Army
  - Parachute Infantry Brigade (Brigada de Infantaria Pára-quedista) with the Pathfinder Coy.
  - 12nd Airmobile infantry Brigade (12° Brigada de Infantaria aeromovel) with newly created 2° Pathfinder Coy
  - Special Operations Brigade (Comando de Operações Especiais)
    - 1st Commando Actions Battalion (1º Batalhão de Ações de Comandos)
    - 1st Special Forces Battalion (1º Batalhão de Forças Especiais)
- Brazilian Navy
  - Combat Divers Groupment (Grupamento de Mergulhadores de Combate)
  - Brazilian Marine Corps
    - 1st Special Recon Company atteched to Marine Corps Special Operations Battalion (Batalhão de Operações Especiais de Fuzileiros Navais, Batalhão Tonelero)
    - Recon and Surveillance Platoons atteched to Infantry Battalions

Canada:

- Canadian Special Operations Regiment
- Joint Task Force 2

Denmark:

- Jægerkorpset
- Frømandskorpset
- Sirius Patrol (two-man arctic patrols)
- Special Support and Reconnaissance Company.

France:

- 1st Marine Infantry Parachute Regiment
- 13th Parachute Dragoon Regiment
- Commando Parachute Group
- 2nd Hussars Regiment

Georgia:

- Special Operations Forces
- State Security Service

Greece

- Special Paratrooper Department (ETA - Eidiko Tmima Alexiptotiston)

Germany

- Fernspäher

India:

- Para Commandos
- MARCOS
- Special Frontier Force
- Garud Commando Force
- Ghatak Platoon

Indonesia:

- Kopassus
- Combat Reconnaissance Platoon (Ton Taipur)
- Taifib
- Kopaska

Ireland:

- Army Ranger Wing (ARW)
- Cavalry Corps
- Directorate of Military Intelligence

Israel:

- Sayeret Matkal
- Shaldag Unit
- Shayetet 13
- Maglan

Italy:

- 185th Parachute Regiment special reconnaissance and target acquisition

Lithuania:

- Lithuanian Special Operation Force

New Zealand:

- 1st New Zealand Special Air Service Regiment

Malaysia:

- Malaysian Army
  - Grup Gerak Khas
  - Pathfinder Company (Malaysia)
- Royal Malaysian Navy
  - PASKAL
- Royal Malaysian Air Force
  - PASKAU
- Royal Malaysian Police
  - 69 Commando
  - Special Actions Unit
- Malaysian Coast Guard
  - Special Task and Rescue

Pakistan:

- Pakistan Army
  - Special Service Group (SSG) "Black Storks"
- Pakistan Navy
  - Special Service Group Navy (SSGN)
- Pakistan Air Force
  - Special Service Wing (SSW)

Poland:

- GROM
- 1 Pułk Specjalny Komandosów

Portugal:

- Tropas de Operações Especiais (Special Operations Troops)
- Precursores Aeroterrestres (Air-Land Pathfinders)
- Destacamento de Ações Especiais (Naval Special Actions Detachment)

Russia:

- Federal Security Service "FSB"
  - Alpha Group Directorate "A" of the FSB Special Purpose Center (TsSN FSB), is an elite, stand-alone sub-unit of Russia's special forces.
  - Vympel Group Directorate "V" of the FSB Special Purpose Center (TsSN FSB), is an elite, stand-alone sub-unit of Russia's special forces.
- Armed Forces of the Russian Federation
  - Special Operations Forces : Special Forces of the strategic level: under direct command of the Chief of Staff
  - Spetsnaz GRU 2nd, 3rd, 10th, 14th, 16th, 22nd, 24th, 346th Spetsnaz Brigade (obrSpN): Ground Forces Special Forces
  - 45th Guards Spetznaz Brigade Spetsnaz VDV: Airborne command Special Forces (orpSpN)
  - Russian commando frogmen 42nd, 420th, 431st, 561st Naval Reconnaissance Spetsnaz Point (omrpSpN) : Navy Special Forces
  - Razvedka "Military intelligence" personnel/units within larger formations in ground troops, airborne troops and marines. Intelligence battalion in the divisions, reconnaissance company in the brigade, a reconnaissance platoon in the regiment. Special Units of regular forces with training focusing on reconnaissance (pathfinder-like formations attached to other units. Not Special Forces). Mascot: bat.

Sri Lanka:

- Sri Lanka Army Commando Regiment
- Sri Lanka Army Special Forces Regiment
- Special Boat Squadron (Sri Lanka)
- Sri Lanka Air Force Regiment Special Force

Sweden:

- Särskilda Operationsgruppen (Special Operations Task Group)
- Underrättelsebataljonen (Special Reconnaissance and Intelligence Battalion)
- Kustjägarna (Coastal Rangers)
- Fallskärmsjägarna (Parachute Rangers)

United Kingdom:

- British Army
  - Special Air Service (SAS)
  - Special Reconnaissance Regiment (SRR)
  - Pathfinder Platoon
  - 4/73 (Sphinx) Special Observation Post Battery RA
  - Honourable Artillery Company
- Royal Navy
  - Special Boat Service (SBS)
  - 30 Commando Information Exploitation Group Royal Marines

United States:

- United States Air Force
  - United States Air Force Special Tactics Squadrons
    - United States Air Force Special Reconnaissance
- United States Army
  - United States Army 1st Special Forces Operational Detachment-Delta (Airborne) (1st SFOD-D) / "Delta Force"
  - United States Army 75th Ranger Regiment (United States Army Rangers)
    - United States Army 75th Ranger Regiment, Regimental Reconnaissance Company (RRC)
  - United States Army Intelligence Support Activity (USAISA) / "The Activity"
  - United States Army Special Forces ("Green Berets")
    - United States Army Special Operations Team-Alpha
- United States Marine Corps
  - United States Marine Corps Force Reconnaissance
  - United States Marine Raider Regiment (United States Marine Raiders)
- United States Navy
  - United States Naval Special Warfare Development Group (DEVGRU) / "SEAL Team 6"
  - Navy SWCC
  - United States Navy SEALs

== See also ==
- Combat tracking
- Intelligence collection management
- List of intelligence gathering disciplines
- Special Activities Center

== Bibliography ==
- Lord, Cliff; Tennant, Julian (2000). ANZAC Elite: The Airborne and Special Forces Insignia of Australia and New Zealand. Wellington, New Zealand: IPL Books. ISBN 0-908876-10-6.
