= Swedish Parachute Ranger School =

Parachute Ranger School
- Fallskärmsjägarskolan
- Active: 1952–2009
- Country: Sweden
- Allegiance: Swedish Armed Forces
- Branch: Swedish Army
- Type: School
- Part of: Life Regiment Hussars (K 3) (Note: Karlsborg Anti-Aircraft Regiment (1954–1961), Göta Signal Regiment (1961–1983) and the Life Regiment Hussars (1984–2009))
- Garrison/HQ: Karlsborg
- Mottos: Vilja, mod och uthållighet (Note: The motto was adopted in 1951 when the FJS was raised.) ("Will, Courage and Perseverance")
- March: "Fallskärmsjägarmarsch" (S. Samuelsson) (Note: The march was adopted in 1956 and was established in 1962 by Army Order 418/1962.)

Commanders
- Notable commanders: Captain Nils-Ivar Carlborg

Insignia
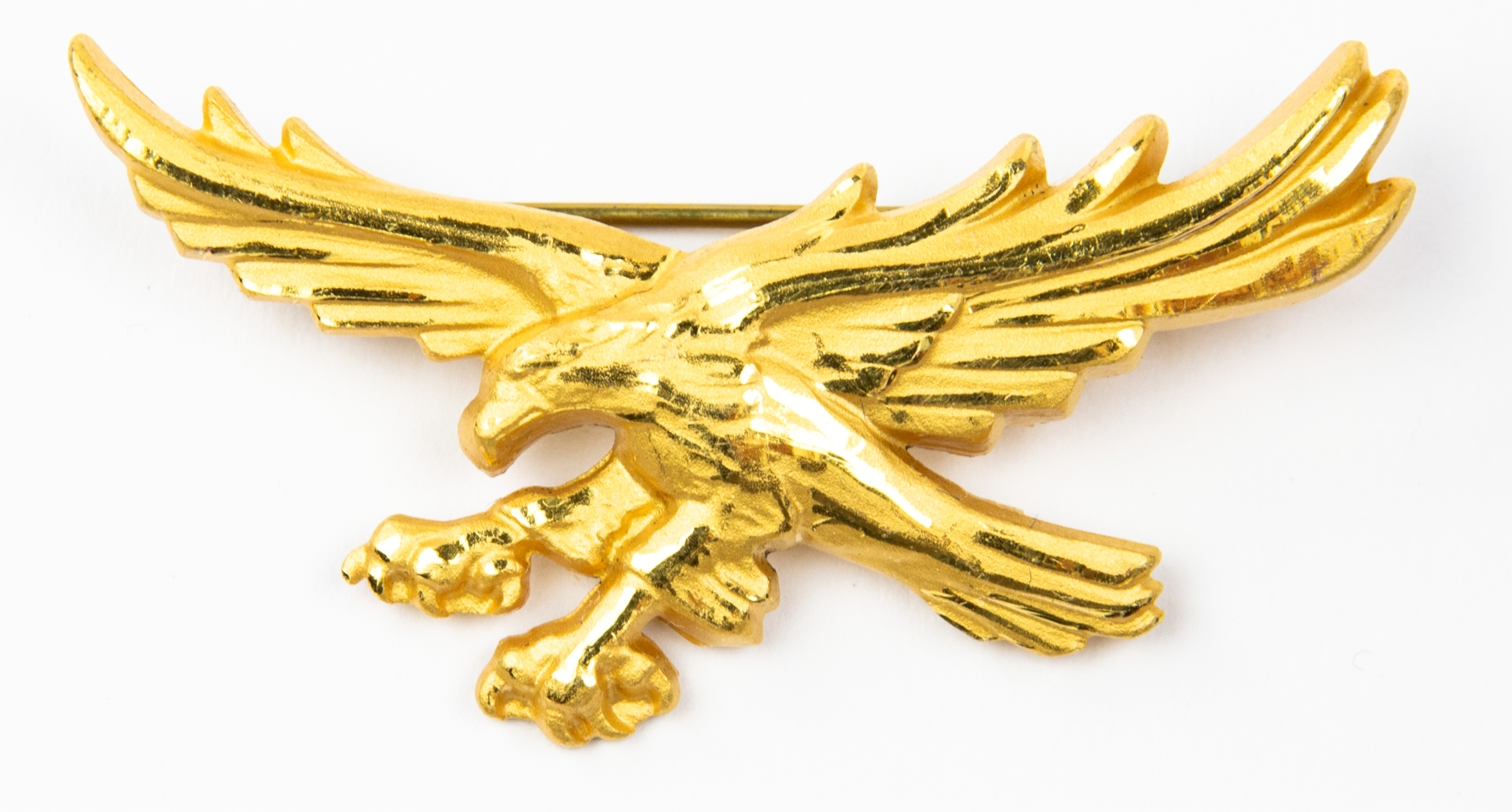
- Insignia m/51-60

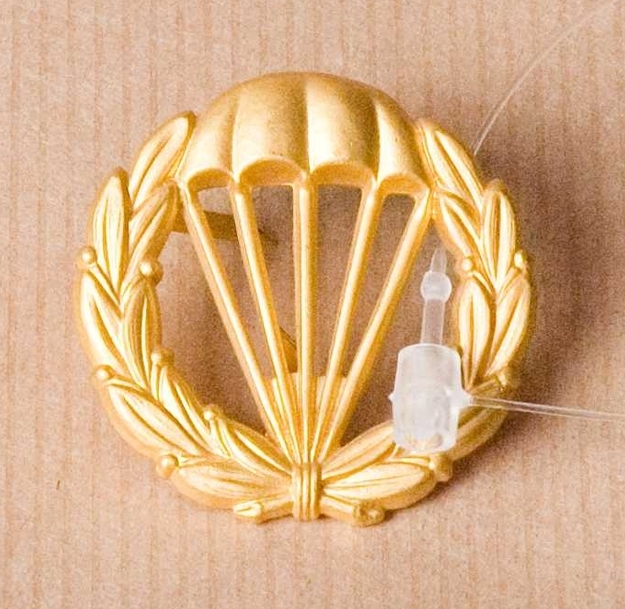
- Cap badge m/53-60

The Parachute Ranger School (Swedish: Fallskärmsjägarskolan, FJS), is the Swedish Army's paratrooper ranger school and the home of Fallskärmsjägarna (Parachute Rangers) and Särskilda operationsgruppen (Special Operations Group). The school was founded in 1952 by captain Nils-Ivar Carlborg with the intention of creating and training small specialized units no bigger than platoons which were capable of operating deep behind enemy lines and inside enemy-controlled territory. Training is provided for both normal and static line jumps using the C-130 Hercules aircraft, as well as nighttime jumps, free fall jumps, HALO and HAHO. The school was reorganized into the 323rd Parachute Ranger Company in 2009.

== History ==
The Parachute Ranger School was founded as the Swedish Army Parachute Ranger School (Arméns fallskärmsjägarskola) in 1952 by then captain Nils-Ivar Carlborg. The task was to use small platoon-sized units to penetrate and disrupt the enemy. The mode of transport was the airplane and at low altitude the parachute to get as far as possible behind enemy lines. The unit was initially a part of Karlsborg Anti-Aircraft Regiment (Lv 1). When the Karlsborg Anti-Aircraft Regiment was disbanded in 1961, the unit came to be subordinate to the commanding officer of Göta Signal Regiment (S 2).

The Parachute Ranger School was until 1978 located in the "Parachute Ranger Camp" (Fallskärmsjägarlägret), which until 1951 was the camp (barracks) ("Gamla lägret") of the Second Quartermaster Company (Andra intendenturkompaniet, Int 2) at Vätterstranden in Karlsborg. In 1978 the operations were moved to Slutvärnet at Karlsborg Fortress.

In connection with the 1982 Defense Bill, the Life Regiment Hussars (K 3) was relocated from Skövde Garrison to Karlsborg Garrison. This change meant that both the Parachute Ranger School and the Göta Signal Regiment became subordinate to the commanding officer of the Life Regiment Hussars. The Göta Signal Regiment was subsumed in the Life Regiment Hussars as a signal battalion and the Parachute Ranger School as a school unit.

On 1 July 1994, the formal designation was changed to the Parachute Ranger Corps (Fallskärmsjägarkåren), but the abbreviation FJS survived. The name was then changed again to the Parachute Ranger School (Fallskärmsjägarskolan), and in 2005 the school became a part of the Swedish Armed Forces Special Forces (Försvarsmaktens specialförband, FM SF).

In 2007 the school was split so that the operations part remained in the special forces system while the training company and the parachute division became subordinate to the Life Regiment Hussars. The Parachute Ranger School was discontinued in 2009, and was reorganized into the 323rd Parachute Ranger Company, 32nd Intelligence Battalion (323. Fallskärmsjägarkompaniet, 32. Underrättelsebataljonen), which also carry on the traditions of the Parachute Ranger School. Internally, the school's heraldic arms is used by the company.

== Current activities ==
The school is currently responsible for all parachute training within the Swedish Armed Forces. Since the 1980s, FJS became more focused on training units focused on long range reconnaissance which is the parachute rangers' main objective today. The school also trains the elite force Särskilda operationsgruppen - Special Operations Group which is an equivalent of the US Delta Force and British 22 SAS - only part of their training is provided by FJS.

== Heraldry and traditions ==
=== Colours, standards and guidons ===
The Swedish Parachute Ranger School presents one colour. It was drawn by Ingrid Lamby and Kristina Holmgård-Åkerberg and embroidered by machine in appliqué technique by Engelbrektsson Flag factory. The colour was presented to the then Parachute Ranger Training Corps (FJS) at the Artillery Yard in Stockholm by the Supreme Commander, general Owe Wiktorin on 30 April 1996. It was used as corps colour by FJS until 1 July 2000. The colour may be used according to the decisions of CO K 3. Blazon: "On wine red cloth the badge of the school; a spread-out parachute with five cords inside an open chaplet of laurels and in the second and fourth corners the year 1952 divided with two figures in each corner, all yellow."

=== Coat of arms ===
The coat of the arms of the Swedish Army Paratroop School (FJS) 1952–1994. Blazon: "Azure, a spread-out parachute with five cords inside an open chaplet of laurel, all or." The coat of arms of the Swedish Paratrooper Training Corps (FJS) 1994–2000 and the Swedish Parachute Ranger School since 2000. Blazon: "Purple, a spread-out parachute with five cords inside an open chaplet of laurel, all or".

Coat of arms of the Swedish Army Paratroop School (FJS) 1952–1994.

Coat of the arms of the Swedish Paratrooper Training Corps (FJS) 1994–2000 and the Swedish Parachute Ranger School 2000–present.

=== Medals ===
In 2007, the Fallskärmsjägarskolans förtjänstmedalj ("Swedish Parachute Ranger School Medal of Merit") in gold and silver (FJSGM/SM) of the 8th size was established. The medalj ribbon is of purple moiré with a yellow stripe on each side.

=== Other ===
Since 2009, the 323rd Parachute Ranger Company (323. fallskärmsjägarkompaniet) continues the traditions of the Swedish Parachute Ranger School. Internally, the school's heraldic arms is used by the company.

== Commanding officers ==
- 1952–1953: Nils-Ivar Carlborg
- 1953–1954: Nils Engelheart
- 1954–1957: Torsten Nordin
- 1957–1959: Carl-Olof Wrang
- 1959–1961: Lars-Erik Sjöström
- 1961–1962: Magnus Eriksson
- 1962–1966: Rolf Lundkvist
- 1966–1971: Magnus Eriksson
- 1971–1982: Torbjörn Elming
- 1982–1987: Åke Thörnesjö
- 1987–1989: Anders Kihl
- 1989–1990: Rolf Käck
- 1990–1992: Svante Andersson
- 1992–1995: Anders Gerhard Lilliestierna
- 1995–1998: Lars G Ericsson
- 1998–2000: Björn Olsson
- 2000–2007: Bo Sköld
- 2007–2009: Thomas Hagman

== Names, designations and locations ==
Names	Translation	From		To
Arméns fallskärmsjägarskola	[Swedish] Army Paratroop School [Swedish] Army Airborne (Jump) School	1952	–	1994
Fallskärmsjägarkåren	[Swedish] Paratrooper Training Corps	1994	–	2000
Fallskärmsjägarskolan	[Swedish] Parachute Ranger School [Swedish] Paratrooper School	2000	–	2009
Designations		From		To
FJS		1952	–	2009
Locations		From		To
Karlsborg Garrison/Lv 1		1951	–	1952
Karlsborg Garrison/Int 2 barackläger		1952	–	1978-06-01
Karlsborg Garrison/Slutvärnet		1978-06-01	–	2009

== See also ==
- Fallskärmsjägarna
- Särskilda operationsgruppen - SOG
- Särskilda Skyddsgruppen - SSG
- Särskilda Inhämtningsgruppen - SIG
