= Yonghungdo Power Station =

Korean power station

Yonghungdo power station
- Country: South Korea
- Coordinates: 37°14′28″N 126°26′19″E
- Operator: Korea South-East Power Company

Power generation
- Nameplate capacity: 5,080 MW

Yonghungdo Power Station (also called Yeongheung power station) is a large coal-fired power station on Yeongheungdo, an island within the municipal borders of Incheon metropolitan city, in South Korea, owned by Korea Electric Power Corporation. The plant is estimated to have been the coal-fired power plant which emitted the ninth most carbon dioxide in 2018, at 27 million tons, and relative emissions are estimated at 1.5 kg per kWh. Conversion to gas is being considered.

== See also ==
- List of coal power stations
