= Eugene F. Clark =

- Born: Eugene Franklin Clark; 18 July 1911; Redfield, South Dakota
- Died: 26 June 1998 (aged 86); Sparks, Nevada
- Military career
- Allegiance: United States
- Branch: United States Navy
- Service years: Retired in 1966
- Rank: Commander
- Wars: WWII and Korean War
- Awards: Navy Cross

Commander Eugene Franklin Clark (18 July 1911 – 26 June 1998) was a U.S. Navy officer.

== Military career ==
Clark rose through the enlisted ranks of the Navy from seaman to chief petty officer in the yeoman rating before being commissioned as an officer during World War II. During World War II, Clark participated in the invasion of Okinawa. After the war, Clark commanded LST-865 and USS Errol, then participated in clandestine operations along the China coast in support of the Nationalist Chinese, before serving as the chief interpreter during war crimes trials on Guam. Clark was serving on General Douglas MacArthur's staff, in the Geographic Branch, at the start of the Korean War. He was living with his wife, Enid, and two children on the outskirts of Tokyo.

Lt. Clark was deployed with bilingual former ROK Navy Lt. Youn Joung and former ROK Army officer Col. Ke In-ju and KLO to reconnoiter the Inchon area before the Inchon Landing. This is known as the Operation Trudy Jackson (ko:트루디 잭슨 작전). The area was complicated by 29-foot (8.8 m) tides and mudflats up to 6,000 yards (5,500 m) long. The three were transported from United States Fleet Activities Sasebo on HMS Charity, to a 1 September 1950 rendezvous with ROK Commander Lee Sung Ho's PC-703, southwest of Tokchok-do (Deokjeok Island). Upon landing on Tokchok-do, they quickly learned Yonghung-do (Yeongheung Island) was only occupied by five North Korean troops, with a battalion on Taebu-do. Lee assigned LTJG Paik and ten sailors to help Clark and his men capture Yonghung-do, which they did in short order.

Clark and his men secured the help of the 1,000 plus people on the island, imprisoned 24 communist sympathizers, and enlisted 114 of the young men to form an island defense guard. He then proceeded to gather information concerning navigational lights, especially those on Pamli-do and Sowolmi-do, besides determining if East Channel or Flying Fish Channel were mined, and if the channels were covered by large guns. Lee, under orders from Admiral Sohn Won-yil, continued to support the operation, as Clark requisitioned five junks and four sampans for future operations.

Clark soon occupied Palmi-do (Palmi Island) and its lighthouse, a strategic location Clark could use as an alternate base, and observation vantage for spotting future targets. Lee and Clark set up a mine-searching patrol, and Lee investigated the guns on Wolmi-do (Wolmi Island) and Sowolmi-do (Sowolmi Island). Clark's recruited local fishermen to capture junks and occupants for interrogation, and led a raid on Taemuui-do to capture additional prisoners for interrogation. Additionally, Clark made his own reconnaissance of Wolmi-do, and made contact with resistance elements at Manhak San and Sorae San near Yongdungpo, getting important target information on gun emplacements and troop strengths around Inchon, Kimpo and Seoul. Clark was also able to confirm the accuracy of the Japanese tide tables.

Yet, the North Koreans on Taebu-do (Daebu Island) had been slowly infiltrating men onto Yonghung-do, and actually sent a force of six junks, carrying with 80–90 men, to retake the island. Clark led his own fleet of five junks against this enemy junk fleet, and was able to capture two and sink four junks, temporarily stopping the attack. Clark even was able to get the destroyer USS Hanson to shell Taebu-do. Yet, by the 14th, Clark knew another assault on Yonghung-do was imminent, and prepared to evacuate 300 of the islanders on 17 captured junks. Clark and his men then moved to Palmi-do, where they lit the light at 00:50 on the 15th, guiding the invasion fleet proceeding up Flying Fish Channel.

On D-day plus one, a battalion of Marines was deployed to take Taebu-do and Yonghung Do. They stormed the islands only to discover the Communists had already killed over 50 people who had helped Clark, but remained behind on the island. Clark was awarded the Silver Star by the Navy for "conspicuous gallantry and intrepidity" in obtaining "vital intelligence information". Clark was also awarded the Legion of Merit by the Far East Command for "exceptionally meritorious conduct."

Later, in advance of the United Nations Forces making their way to the Yalu River, Clark, Youn Joung, and 150 South Korean guerrillas went island hopping up the west coast of North Korea. Clark secured several islands and began infiltrating agents. When they reached the Yalu, in late October, they discovered large numbers of Chinese Communist troops were crossing the Yalu into North Korea. Clark sent this information to the Far East Command in Tokyo, but they ignored it. Clark received the Oak leaf cluster for that mission.

In his last mission in early 1951, Clark escorted Brigadier General Crawford Sams, one of the Army's top doctors, into enemy-held Wonsan to investigate a reported outbreak of bubonic plague. Clark's team penetrated a small Chinese Communist hospital, and Dr. Sams concluded that it was a brand of smallpox. For this, Eugene Clark was awarded the Navy Cross.

== Retirement ==
Commander Eugene Franklin Clark retired from the United States Navy in 1966 with the rank of commander. He retired to California and Nevada with his wife Enid.

It was not until the summer of 2000, when Thomas Fleming published an account of Clark's exploits in MHQ: The Quarterly Journal of Military History, that the Clark family remembered the narrative he had written shortly after returning home in 1951. They also had a Department of Defense clearance to publish The Secrets of Inchon: The Untold Story of the Most Daring Covert Mission of the Korean War.

== See also ==
- Operation Trudy Jackson
- Inchon (film)
- Operation Chromite (film)
