= Pungdo =

Island in South Korea

Coordinates: 37°06′N 126°23′E

- Hangul: 풍도
- Hanja: 楓島
- RR: Pungdo
- MR: P'ungdo

Larger map of the Ansan-si districts. Danwon-gu district covers the west mainland part and stretches to the sea to cover Daebudo and Pungdo islands. (Pungdo is located in the bottom left).

Pungdo (Korean: 풍도) or Pung Island, is a small populated island on the Yellow Sea, located in within the municipal borders of Ansan, Gyeonggi Province, South Korea. It is about 74 km southwest of Seoul, the country's capital, and 24 km south of the larger island Daebudo.

Naval battle of Pungdo took place in the vicinity of the island in July 1894. The island had some military strategic importance, as it is sitting next to the two navigable channels out of the Bay of Asan.

== See also ==
- Islands of Korea
