= Carl-Olof Wrang =

Swedish Army lieutenant colonel

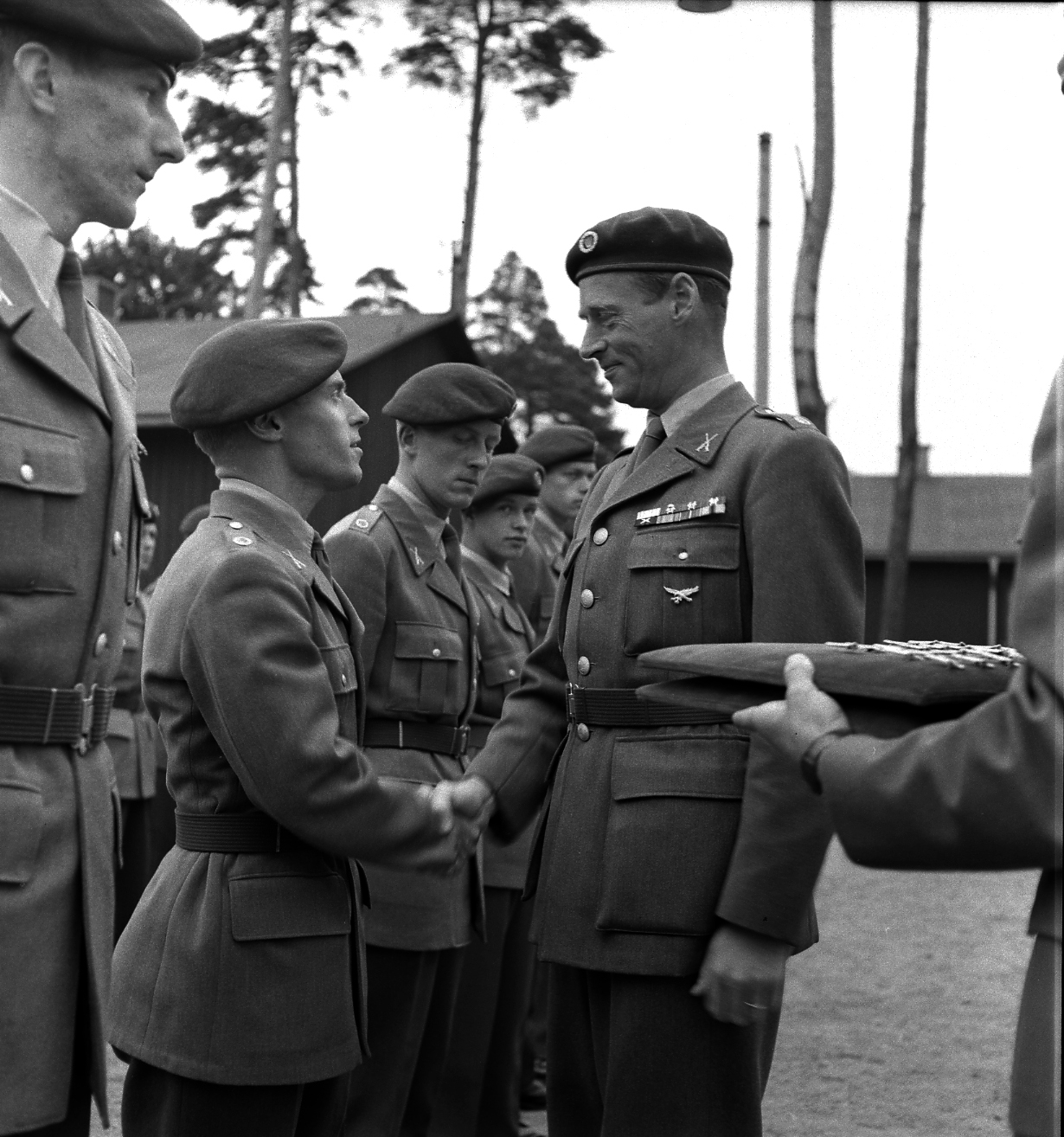
- Wrang (right) at the Army Paratroop School in 1958.
- Born: 27 January 1917; Lidingö, Sweden
- Died: 18 September 1998 (aged 81); Vallentuna, Sweden
- Military career
- Allegiance: Sweden
- Branch: Swedish Army
- Service years: 1939, 1941–46, 1953–77 (Sweden); 1939–1941 (Finland)
- Rank: Lieutenant colonel (Sweden); Lieutenant (Finland); Obersturmführer (Germany)
- Commands: Swedish Army Paratroop School
- Conflicts: Winter War; Märkäjärvi (1939); Continuation War; Battle of Hanko; Congo Crisis; Cyprus dispute

Carl-Olof Wrang (27 January 1917 – 18 September 1998) was a Swedish Army lieutenant colonel. Wrang joined the Waffen-SS in 1939 but deserted and instead fought the Soviets in Finland during the Winter War. Wrang also participated in the Continuation War and saw action in the Battle of Hanko. After the war, Wrang re-entered the Swedish Army and was placed in the reserve in 1946. He worked as a factory manager for a few years, before resuming his military career. Wrang served as commanding officer of the Swedish Army Paratroop School in the late-1950s and served as a UN observer in Kashmir and with the Swedish battalions during the Congo Crisis and during the Cyprus dispute in the 1960s. He retired in 1977.

== Early life ==
Wrang was born on 27 January 1917 in Lidingö, Sweden, the son of Lieutenant Colonel Ragnar Vrang and his wife Hild (née Stenhammar). Wrang passed studentexamen in Gävle in 1936 and was commissioned as an officer in 1939 and was assigned as a second lieutenant to Hälsinge Regiment (I 14).

== Career ==
Wrang joined the Waffen-SS in 1939 but never experienced active service. Instead he deserted from his unit in order to cross the Norwegian frontier. His intention, however, was not SS service. In 1939 he applied to the French Army, as he felt war between France and Germany was imminent. Foreign service being limited to the French Legion, he remained in Sweden. Instead, Wrang joined the Finnish Army during the Winter War and was promoted to second lieutenant and took part in the battle of Märkäjärvi. Returning to Sweden in April 1940, he re-entered the Swedish Army for fear that his country would share the fate of Norway and Denmark. Then invasion not materialising, he applied to joint British forces fighting the Italians in Greece. He was, much to his consternation, denied a travel permit. The reason for his subsequent desertion was he hoped to find his way to Finland via Norway. The only way to do this was to enlist in the SS. To this he readily agreed. Flown via Copenhagen to Berlin, he was persuaded to remain in SS service despite a complete lack of interest. On discovering a Finnish volunteer battalion was being raised, he applied for an immediate transfer to the unit's base at Stralsund training camp, which was granted.

Promoted to Obersturmführer on arrival, his application for transfer to Finland was granted following the discovery that the volunteers would be deployed in Ukraine. He then served with the Finnish Volunteer Battalion of the Waffen-SS of the 5th SS Panzer Division Wiking for several weeks in 1941. Wrang subsequently joined the Swedish Volunteer Battalion on the Hanko Front during the Continuation War and saw action in the Battle of Hanko in 1941. One who opposed his discharge was SS recruitment manager Gottlob Berger, who felt the decision should be challenged as Wrang could be useful for "future work" in Sweden centering on recruitment. In 1941, he was promoted to lieutenant in the Finnish Army. Returning home following his service, he rejoined the Swedish Army and was promoted to lieutenant there as well.

Wrang was transferred to the reserve as lieutenant in 1946, where he became captain in 1947. Wrang worked as a factory manager at SMS-industri AB from 1946 to 1953. In 1953, he was appointed captain in the Svea Life Guards (I 1) and from 1954 to 1956 he attended the Royal Swedish Army Staff College. He then served as commanding officer of the Swedish Army Paratroop School from 1957 to 1959 when he transferred to North Scanian Infantry Regiment (I 6) where he served as major. Wrang served as a UN observer in Kashmir from 1961 to 1962 and then in the Congo, part of the United Nations Operation in the Congo (ONUC) in 1963. In 1964, Wrang served in Cyprus, part of the United Nations Peacekeeping Force in Cyprus (UNFICYP). Wrang retired as a lieutenant colonel in 1977.

== Personal life ==
In 1942 he married Karin Gustafsson (born 1917), the daughter of Rulle Gustafsson and Maria Söderstedt. They had three children; Peter (born 1943), Stefan (born 1947), and Margareta (born 1952).

He was a member of the Swedish Order of Freemasons.

== Death ==
Wrang died on 18 September 1998 in Vallentuna.

== Dates of rank ==
=== Swedish Army ===
- 1939 – Second lieutenant
- 1941 – Lieutenant
- 1947 – Captain
- 1959 – Major
- ???? – Lieutenant colonel

=== Finnish Army ===
- 1939 – Second lieutenant
- 1941 – Lieutenant

=== German Army ===
- 1941 –Obersturmführer

== Awards and decorations ==
=== Swedish ===
- (Sweden) Knight of the Order of the Sword (1964)
- (Sweden) Commemorative Medal on the occasion of the second Lingiad (Minnesmedalj med anledning av andra Lingiaden) (1949)
- (Sweden) Army Shooting Medal (Arméns skyttemedalj)
- (Sweden) Swedish Paratrooper Medal (Fallskärmsjägarmedalj)

=== Foreign ===
- (Finland) 3rd Class of the Order of the Cross of Liberty with oak leaves
- (Finland) 3rd Class of the Order of the Cross of Liberty with swords
- (Finland) 3rd Class of the Order of the Cross of Liberty
- (Finland) 4th Class of the Order of the Cross of Liberty with swords
- (United Kingdom) Honorary Member of the Royal Victorian Order (June 1956)
- United Nations Medal (ONUC)
- United Nations Medal (UNFICYP)
- (Finland) Finnish War Memorial Medal
- 3 x Finnish Memorial Cross on the occasion of Finland's war 1939–45
