= 32nd Intelligence Battalion =

- 32. Underrättelsebataljon
- Country: Sweden
- Branch: Swedish Army
- Type: Military intelligence units Special reconnaissance units
- Size: Battalion
- Part of: Life Regiment Hussars
- Garrison/HQ: Karlsborg
- Engagements: KFOR; War in Afghanistan; Northern Mali conflict

The 32nd Intelligence Battalion (Swedish: 32. Underrättelsebataljonen) is the premier reconnaissance and intelligence gathering unit of the Swedish Army. The battalion possesses units and material to conduct long range reconnaissance, sensitive sight exploration (SSE), sabotage and control indirect fire as well as close air support (CAS). It also has the main responsibility for all drone operations in the Swedish military. It is organized under the Life Regiment Hussars (K 3) in Karlsborg.

== Tasks and operations ==
The 32nd Intelligence Battalion is tasked with various reconnaissance and intelligence gathering operations. The majority of this being carried out by the Ranger squadrons, who operate with 8 man patrols over long ranges deep behind enemy lines in order to conduct reconnaissance or sabotage vital enemy support functions/infrastructure. In addition to that, the battalion has unmanned aerial vehicles, both smaller SUAV systems at the Ranger squadrons as well as larger, more advanced TUAV systems.

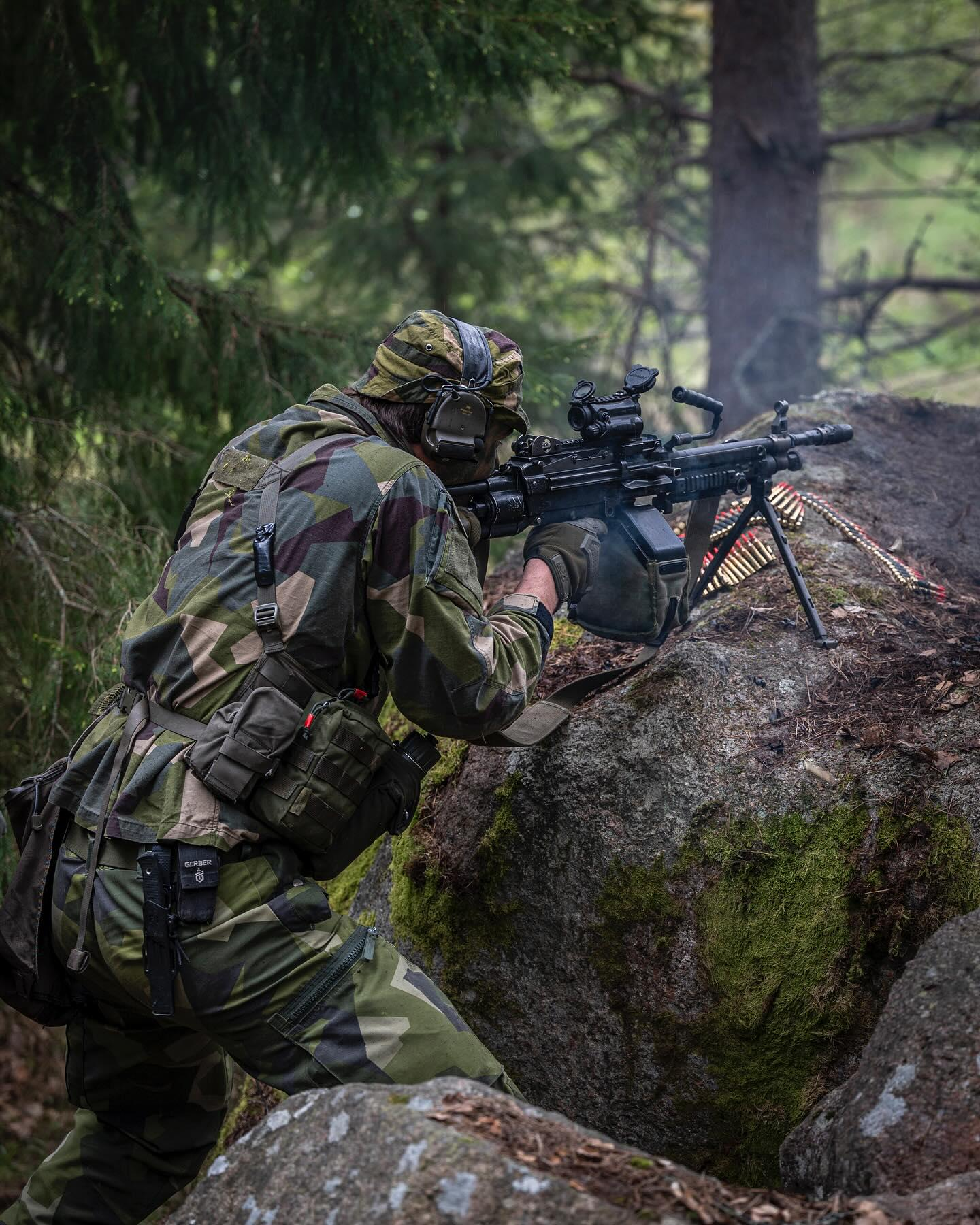
Soldier of the 321st Squadron (Recon), defending a command post during a training exercise.

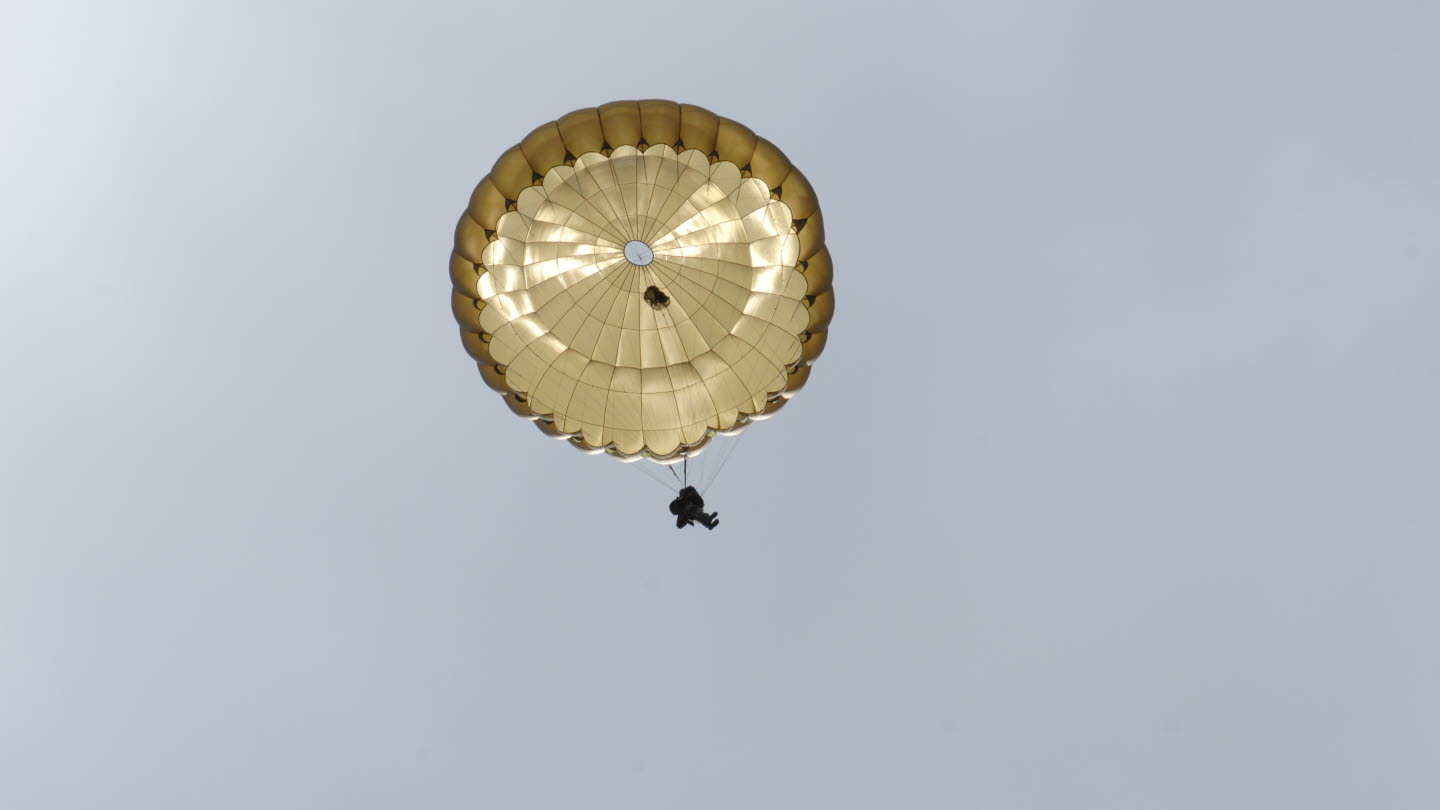
Member of the Parachute Ranger Squadron during a training operation.

The battalion has deployed to Kosovo, Afghanistan and Mali, conducting the full spectrum of its wartime tasks.

== Selection ==
Anyone who applies to the battalion must have completed an approved basic military education (GMU) or Swedish military service. In addition to that, the person must also meet the position-specific requirements that are set, and which appear in the advertisement for the respective position.

== Organization ==
The battalion includes, in addition to troop reconnaissance capability with fighter soldiers of the intelligence squadrons, unmanned aerial vehicles (UAVs), paratroopers, snipers, medics, command and maintenance resources, and human source contact acquisition units.

The battalion in its current form comprises:

- Staff & support squadron

- Two reconnaissance squadrons

- Parachute Ranger squadron

The staff and support squadron provides command and logistic support, along with housing several specialist functions such as a HUMINT platoon and the battalions TUAV's. The reconnaissance squadrons along with the parachute rangers are made up of 3–4 platoons with 8-man patrols along with specialist functions such as snipers, TACP and SUAV teams.

== Similar units ==
- United Kingdom – 1st Intelligence, Surveillance and Reconnaissance Brigade
- France – 13th Parachute Dragoon Regiment
- Germany – Fernspählehrkompanie 200
- Norway – Etterretningsbataljonen
- Finland – Laskuvarjojääkärit
- United States - Regimental Reconnaissance Company, United States Marine Corps Reconnaissance Battalions
