= Regimental Reconnaissance Company =

US Army special operations unit

75th Ranger Regiment – Regimental Reconnaissance Company
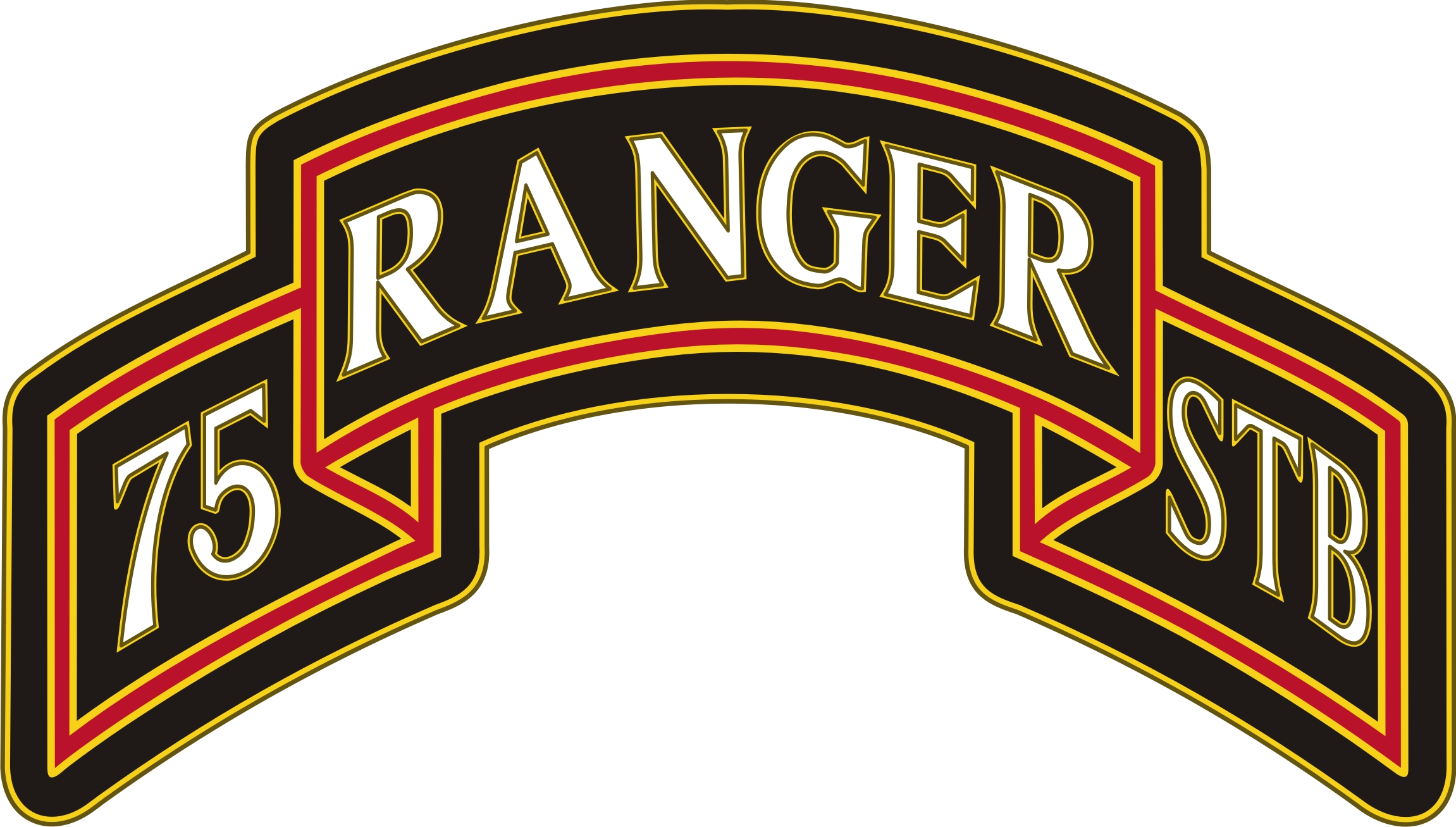
- Active: October 1984–present
- Country: United States
- Branch: United States Army
- Type: Special Mission Unit
- Role: Special Reconnaissance; Direct action
- Size: Classified
- Part of: Special Troops Battalion; 75th Ranger Regiment; Joint Special Operations Command; United States Army Special Operations Command
- Garrison/HQ: Fort Benning, Georgia
- Nicknames: RRC, RRD, "The Company", "Task Force Red"
- Engagements: Operation Just Cause; Operation Desert Storm; Operation Uphold Democracy; Task Force Falcon; War on terror; Operation Enduring Freedom

The Regimental Reconnaissance Company (RRC) of the U.S. Army 75th Ranger Regiment is a special reconnaissance unit that has been a member of Joint Special Operations Command (JSOC) since 2004. It was formerly known as the Regimental Reconnaissance Detachment (RRD) and was renamed to the RRC in 2007 and expanded. The unit became part of JSOC due to its extensive training in special reconnaissance and close target reconnaissance (CTR) operations, and advanced force operations (AFO).

== Disposition ==
Based out of Fort Benning, Georgia, RRC is among the premier special reconnaissance units of the U.S. military.

RRD, as it was originally called, was activated in October 1984 with the formation of the 75th Ranger Regiment Headquarters at Fort Benning. The detachment was tasked with providing worldwide reconnaissance and operational preparation of the environment in support of the 75th Ranger Regiment and other units within United States Army Special Operations Command (USASOC) and JSOC. Traditionally RRD was divided into three six-man teams, one team to support each of the three Ranger battalions. The unit has three primary tasks: Active Reconnaissance, Surveillance, and Direct Action. While performing these tasks, the teams can:

- Infiltrate the objective area by parachute (High Altitude Low Opening (HALO), High Altitude High Opening (HAHO), or static lines), helicopter, fixed-wing aircraft, SCUBA, small boat, foot, or other means.
- Remain undetected in the vicinity of the objective area up to five days.
- Perform reconnaissance operations employing a full range of night observation devices, infrared detection devices, unattended early warning sensors, and photographic equipment.
- Perform demolition target analysis.
- Operate small watercraft and inflatable boats.
- Emplace unattended ground sensors, omni-directional navigational beacons, hand-emplaced expendable jammers, and electronic target designation devices.
- Collect combat information to satisfy priority information requirements and mission-essential elements of information. Teams report information by use of long-range, secure, burst-transmission communications equipment.
- Perform Drop Zone (DZ) selection, marking and reception duties.
- Report objective area weather conditions.
- Perform highly selective, limited attacks or ambushes when so tasked.
- Link up with the main body of the Ranger force in the objective area, or escape and evade the enemy in order to return to friendly lines.

When the 75th's Regimental Special Troops Battalion was officially activated in October 2007, RRD changed its name to the Regimental Reconnaissance Company (RRC) and opened its selection course to any soldiers in the U.S. Army who met the established pre-requisites.

== Selection and training ==
All candidates must complete selection process including navigation from point to point in mountainous terrain. Candidates will walk 12–20 miles per day carrying up to 75 lbs in their rucksack. On the last day of stress week, candidates will walk a total of 40 miles (the long walk). Each selection class will start with as few as five and as many as 20 candidates. Each soldier who wants to attend selection must undergo psychological screening and mental aptitude testing along with passing various physical events including the Army PT test. Of the 15–20 candidates who attend selection usually 5–7 will finish and usually only 50% of the ones who finish will actually be selected and have the opportunity to attend the 29-week-long Reconnaissance Training Course, including free-fall training, computers, advanced communications, digital photography, photo editing, reconnaissance reporting formats, fieldcraft and stalks, infiltration and exfiltration methods, close-air support, CQB and hand-to-hand combat techniques (both armed and unarmed), advanced driving techniques, marksmanship, demolitions, tactical tracking and advanced medical techniques.

- Recruiting is targeted at male soldiers in the ranks of specialist through sergeant first class from the infantry, field artillery, medical, and communications career management fields.
- The company also has vacancies for infantry staff sergeants and sergeants first class, communications and information systems operation privates through staff sergeants, medical privates through sergeants first class, and privates through sergeants first class who are unit supply specialists (MOS 92Y) or automated logistics specialists (MOS 92A).

== Combat operations ==
It is assumed that RRD/RRC was involved in Operation Just Cause in Panama in 1989 and Desert Shield/Storm in 1990/1991 as elements of the Ranger Battalions were deployed in both conflicts.

In 1994 the 1st and 2nd Battalions and a company of the 3rd Battalion were en route to Haiti. The operation was canceled within five minutes of its commencement due to successful negotiations. While the Ranger Battalions were sent home, an RRD team was forward deployed to provide reconnaissance capabilities for Operation Uphold Democracy.

On 24 November 2000 the 75th Ranger Regiment deployed Regimental Reconnaissance Detachment Team 2 and a command and control element to Kosovo in support of Task Force Falcon.

The RRD was constantly deployed to Afghanistan in support of Operation Enduring Freedom as many of their skillsets have proven to be invaluable to the warfighting effort. The RRD was placed under JSOC command to conduct special reconnaissance for all JSOC units.

In November 2001, during the invasion of Afghanistan, the 75th Ranger Regiment carried out its second combat parachute drop into Afghanistan: a platoon-sized Ranger security element, including Regimental Reconnaissance Detachment Team 3 conducted the missions: Objective Wolverine, Raptor and Operation Relentless Strike. Regimental Reconnaissance Detachment Team 3 conducted a combat military freefall parachute drop onto Wrath Drop Zone in southeast Afghanistan on 10 November 2001. This was conducted in order to establish a Flight Landing Strip for follow on combat operations. Regimental Reconnaissance Detachment Team 3 conducted a combat static line parachute drop onto Shiloh Drop Zone in southeast Afghanistan on 21 November 2001. This was conducted in order to establish a flight Landing Strip for follow on combat operations.

In July 2004, Regimental Reconnaissance Detachment Team 3 conducted a combat military freefall parachute drop onto Tillman Drop Zone in southeast Afghanistan in order to emplace tactical equipment.

In 2006, a six-man RRD team attached to the JSOC Task Force inserted into the Hindu Kush mountain range after intelligence indicated an insurgent chief, Jalaluddin Haqqani, would be entering Afghanistan from Pakistan. After establishing an observation post (OP) at a position almost 4,000 meters above sea level, the RRD team waited and watched for their target, as insurgents arrived into the area, the Ranger team was spotted and fired upon. In response, the RRD's attached joint terminal attack controller (JTAC) called in an orbiting B-1B strategic bomber to 'pummel' the insurgents, and an estimated 100 were killed in the airstrikes but Haqqani was not among them.

On 11 July 2009, Regimental Reconnaissance Company Team 1 conducted a combat military freefall parachute drop with a tandem passenger in Afghanistan in order to emplace tactical equipment.

From 2001 until present all RRC teams have been constantly deployed to countries all over the globe in support of combat operations. Each team deploys for at least 1–2 times per year for 4–8 months. They are one of the most heavily deployed elements of the 75th Ranger Regiment.
