= SOT-A =

United States Army Special Operations team

A SOT-A (Special Operations Team-Alpha) is a signals intelligence–electronic warfare (SIGINT-EW) element of the United States Army Special Forces.

They are low-level SIGINT collection teams that intercept and report operational and technical information derived from tactical threat communications through prescribed communications paths. The mission of a SOT-A is to conduct SIGINT/EW in support of information operations (unilaterally or in conjunction with other Special Operations Forces (SOF) elements) to support existing and emerging SOF missions worldwide.

SOT-A's are the direct descendants of the Army Security Agency's Special Operations Detachments (USASASODs).

== Capabilities ==
SOT-A team members can operate in remote, denied areas much like SFODA members. In addition to their linguistic, international Morse code (IMC) and SIGINT skills, SOT-As are trained in tactical and fieldcraft techniques and are certified in the same basic skills as SFODAs. However, SOT-As are rarely certified in advanced SOF skills such as underwater operations (UWO) or military free-fall (MFF).

SOT-As can detect, monitor, and exploit threat communications through communications transmission intercept and direction finding. SOT-As also can deploy with Special Forces Operational Detachments-A (SFODAs or A-teams) to provide SIGINT support for contingency, direct action, force protection, MTT support, or unconventional warfare. These functions may require SOT-As to:

- Deploy with a SFODA.
- Deploy independently and then join a deployed SFODA.
- Operate independently or with other SOT-As.
- Operate and train on advanced collection equipment provided by national intelligence agencies.

=== Insertion/Extraction Techniques ===
- Patrolling
- Helicopter Touchdown,
- Helocast
  - Personnel
  - Small Boat
- Rappel
- Fast Rope
- Special Patrol Insertion/Extraction (SPIE)
- Static-Line Parachuting

SOT-A team members can operate in remote and denied areas. In addition to their linguistic and SIGINT skills, SOT-As are trained in tactical and fieldcraft techniques.

=== SIGINT (Signals Intelligence) ===
- Foreign languages
  - Arabic
  - Chinese
  - Farsi
  - French
  - Indonesian
  - Korean
  - Russian
  - Spanish
  - Thai
  - Tagalog
- Morse Code intercept (>20 GPM)
- Analysis and reporting

=== Advanced training ===
Advanced training may include:

- Survival Evasion Resistance Escape
- Ranger School
- Mountain Survival Course/Mountain Leader Course
- Jumpmaster
- Army Reconnaissance and Surveillance Leaders Course

== Organization ==
According to a 2001 field manual, there is one SIGINT section with six SOT-A per each Special Forces Group. A SOT-A team consists of four members.
