= High-altitude military parachuting =

Method of delivering military personnel, equipment and supplies

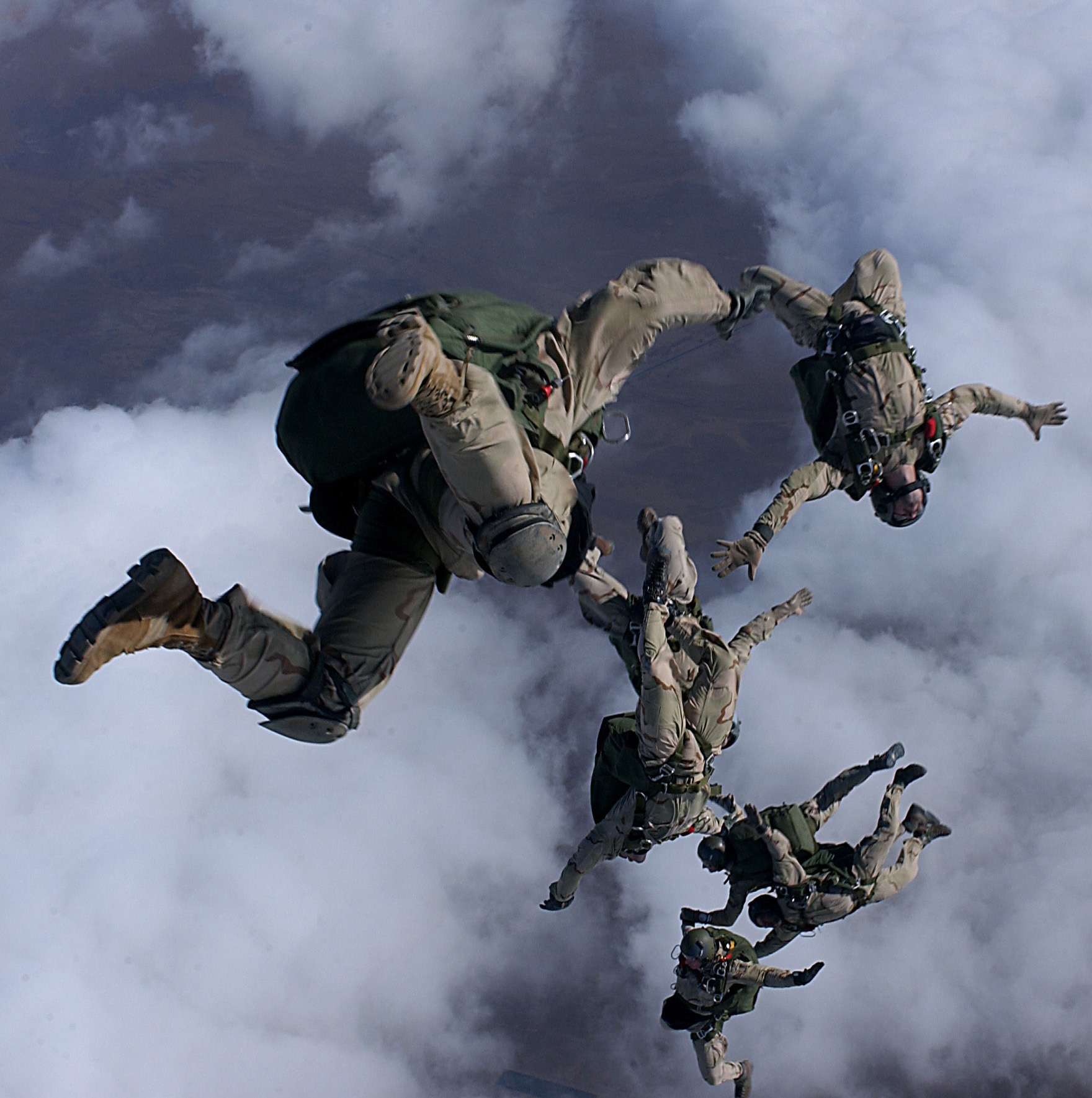
United States Air Force Pararescuemen jump at half the height of a typical HALO/HAHO insertion

U.S. Army soldiers from the 7th SFG(A) conduct HALO jump from a CV-22, 2020

High-altitude military parachuting is a style of parachuting in which personnel, equipment, or supplies are airdropped from an aircraft flying at a high altitude. The technique is often used in covert operations.

High-altitude military parachuting is generally categorised as either high-altitude high-opening (HAHO) or high-altitude low-opening (HALO), depending upon the altitude at which parachutes are deployed after exiting the aircraft. In the HALO technique, the parachutist opens the parachute at a low altitude after free-falling for a period of time, while in the HAHO technique, the parachutist opens the parachute at a high altitude just a few seconds after jumping from the aircraft.

In military operations, HALO is used for delivering equipment, supplies, or personnel, while HAHO is generally used exclusively for personnel. In typical HALO/HAHO insertions the troops jump from altitudes between 15,000 and 35,000 feet (4,600 and 10,700 m). Military parachutists will often reach a terminal velocity of 126 mph (203 km/h), allowing for a jump time under two minutes.

Although HALO techniques were first developed in the 1960s for military use, in recent years HALO parachute designs have been more widely used in non-military applications, including as a form of skydiving.

== High-altitude low-opening (HALO) ==
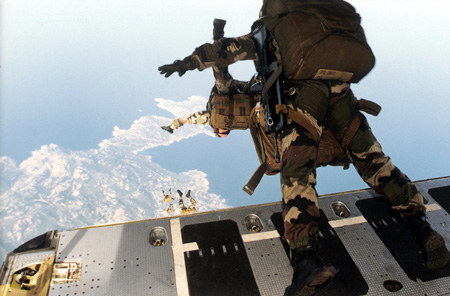
2eme REP Legionnaires HALO jump from a C-160.

The origins of the HALO technique date to 1951 during the Korean War. John K. Singlaub, CIA deputy chief of station in Seoul wanted to use bomber aircraft for agent drops in CIA covert-action operations. Singlaub used an air force B-26 out of a forward operating base (FOB) on Yeongheungdo Island and re-rigged the bomb bay as a jump platform. After he conducted a series of proof of concept test jumps, Singlaub borrowed an air force L-19 Bird Dog and made a series of high-altitude low-opening test jumps over the Han River.

In 1960, the United States Air Force began conducting experiments that followed earlier work by Colonel John Stapp in the late 1940s through early 1950s on survivability for pilots ejecting at high altitude. Stapp, a research biophysicist and medical doctor, used himself in rocket sled tests to study the effects of very high g-forces. Stapp also solved many of the problems of high-altitude flight in his earliest work for the U.S. Air Force and subjected himself to exposure to altitudes of up to 45,000 feet (14,000 m). He later helped develop pressure suits and ejection seats, which have been used in jets ever since. As part of the experiments, on August 16, 1960, Colonel Joseph Kittinger performed the first high-altitude jump at 19.5 miles (31.4 km) above the Earth's surface. Kittinger's friend and United States Naval Parachute Test Jumper Joe Crotwell was also among the consultants and test jumpers of the original program. The first time the technique was used for combat was during the Vietnam War in Laos by members of MACV-SOG Recon Team Florida. SEAL Teams of the United States Navy expanded the HALO technique to include delivery of boats and other large items.

The technique is used to airdrop supplies, equipment, or personnel at high altitudes, where aircraft can fly above surface-to-air missile (SAM) engagement levels through enemy skies without posing a threat to the transport or load. In the event that anti-aircraft cannons are active near the drop zone, the HALO technique also minimizes the parachutist's exposure to flak.

For military cargo airdrops, the rigged load is cut free and rolls out of the plane as a result of gravity. The load then proceeds to fall under canopy to a designated drop zone.

In a typical HALO exercise, the parachutist will jump from the aircraft, free-fall for a period of time at terminal velocity, and open their parachute at an altitude as low as 3,000 feet (910 m) AGL depending on the mission. The combination of high downward speed, minimal forward airspeed, and the use of only small amounts of metal helps to defeat radar and reduces the amount of time a parachute might be visible to ground observers, enabling a stealthy insertion.

== High-altitude high-opening (HAHO) ==
The HAHO technique is used to airdrop personnel at high altitudes when aircraft are unable to fly above enemy skies without posing a threat to the jumpers. In addition, HAHO parachute jumps are employed in the covert insertion of military personnel (generally special operations forces) into enemy territory, in circumstances where the covert nature of an operation may be compromised by the loud noise of parachutes opening at low altitude.

HAHO jumps also allow a longer travel distance due to increased under-canopy time, allowing travelling distances of more than 40 miles (64 km).

In a typical HAHO exercise, the jumper will jump from the aircraft and deploy the parachute immediately after exiting the aircraft. The jumper will use a compass or GPS device for guidance while flying for 30 or more miles (50 kilometers). The jumper must use way points and terrain features to navigate to their desired landing zone and correct their course to account for changes in wind speed and direction. If deploying as a team, the team will form up in a stack while airborne with their parachutes. Usually, the jumper in the lowest position will set the travel course and act as a guide for the other team members. HAHO insertions (excluding training) are intended to be executed at night.

Whilst in the British Special Forces (22 SAS), due to his extensive skydiving background, Charles "Nish" Bruce was pivotal in the original trials and development of the HAHO tactic now routinely used as a conflict insert for special forces.

== Military free-fall (MFF) ==
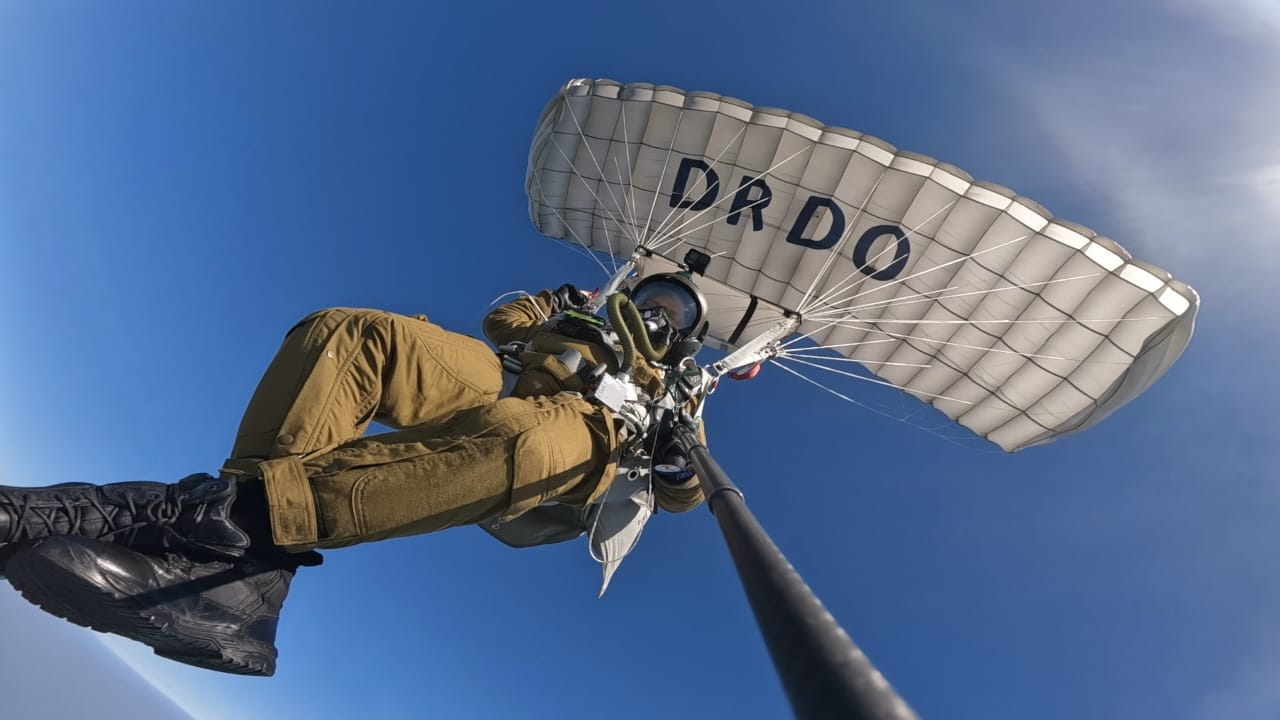
Indian Air Force testing Military Combat Parachute System in a free-fall jump from an altitude of 32,000 feet (9,800 m).

In the United States, military personnel who intend to participate in high-altitude military operations must undergo intense training with strict rules and regulations. Military free-fall is one of the most dangerous and physically demanding skills in special operations. MFF operations are typically done under the cover of darkness, so as to hide the operator's presence from opposing forces.

Certification for military free-fall requires successful completion of static-line certification at Fort Benning, Georgia. The military free-fall course is taught at Yuma Proving Ground and spans four weeks. In the first week of the course students learn to stabilize their bodies in flight in a specially constructed vertical wind tunnel.

== Health risks ==
All types of parachuting techniques are dangerous, but HALO/HAHO carry special risks. At high altitudes (greater than 22,000 feet or 6,700 metres), the partial pressure of oxygen in the Earth's atmosphere is low. Oxygen is required for human respiration and lack of pressure can lead to hypoxia. Rapid ascent in the jump aircraft without flushing sufficient nitrogen from the bloodstream and other body tissues can lead to decompression sickness, also known as caisson disease or "the bends". Since altitude decompression is a form of decompression from saturation, the risk of decompression sickness remains in slow tissues. A longer period of oxygen prebreathing or altitude acclimatisation is necessary to eliminate risk completely. The procedures used for preparation for extravehicular activity in space suits are relevant.

A typical HAHO exercise will require a pre-breathing period (30–45 minutes) prior to jump where the jumper breathes 100% oxygen in order to flush nitrogen from their bloodstream. Also, a HAHO jumper will employ an oxygen bottle during the jump. Danger can come from medical conditions affecting the jumper. Other factors increasing risk of hypoxia include tobacco smoking, alcohol and drug use (including antihistamines, sedatives, and analgesics), anemia, carbon monoxide, fatigue and anxiety. In addition, problems with the oxygen bottle and during the changeover from the pre-breather to the oxygen bottle can result in the return of nitrogen to the jumper's bloodstream and, therefore, an increased likelihood of decompression sickness. A jumper suffering from hypoxia may lose consciousness and therefore be unable to open the parachute.

Another risk is from the low ambient temperatures prevalent at higher altitudes. At an altitude of 35,000 feet (11,000 m), the jumper faces temperatures of −45 °C (−49 °F), and can experience frostbite. However, HAHO jumpers generally wear polypropylene knit undergarments and other warm clothing under a windproof shell to prevent this.

HALO carries the additional risk that if the parachute fails to deploy or lines become tangled, there is less time to resort to the reserve (back-up parachute) or untangle the lines.

A retrospective study pinpointed 134 parachutists with 141 injuries. All these injuries were a result of members in HALO training. The most common injuries found were fractures, which accounted for 35% of the total injuries. Muscle sprains accounted for 34.7% of injuries. Other proportionally higher injuries were dislocations at 9.9%, contusions at 7.8%, and cuts and lacerations at 4.9%. The article also noted that two deaths occurred while the study was being conducted.

== Examples of use ==
- The first combat high-altitude jump took place during the Vietnam War on 28 November 1970, when a six-man MACV-SOG team from Recon Team Florida parachuted from a C-130 at 18,000 feet (5,500 m) into Laos.
- On 14 October 1990, while President George H. W. Bush was at Camp David, a team of operators from 1st Special Forces Operational Detachment–Delta conducted a successful low-level pull HALO drop on the White House as part of an exercise to test the Secret Service response to an attack on principal.
- BJ Worth, a professional stuntman doubling as James Bond, is shown in the 1997 film Tomorrow Never Dies performing a HALO jump.
- In November 2001, a small team of U.S. troops from the 75th Ranger Regiment Regimental Reconnaissance Company freefall parachuted into Afghanistan in order to establish a landing strip.
- In 2002, United States Air Force Pararescue jumpers conducted a HALO jump in Afghanistan as a means of reaching a gravely wounded member of the Australian Special Air Service who was stranded in a minefield.
- Free fall parachute insertions were utilized during the 2003 US invasion of Iraq, as a means of bypassing enemy early warning systems.
- In 2009, during the rescue of Captain Richard Phillips off the coast of Somalia, a team of U.S. Navy SEALs carried out a nighttime HALO jump into the sea in order to reach USS Bainbridge, which was towing a lifeboat containing Philips' hostage takers.
- In 2012, U.S. Navy SEALs used the technique to insert into Somalia to rescue two hostages being held by pirates near the town of Adow.
- Tom Cruise became the first actor to perform a HALO jump on camera for the 2018 film Mission: Impossible – Fallout.

== See also ==
- Project Excelsior
- Billy Waugh
- List of paratrooper forces
- Military Freefall Parachutist Badge
