= Daebudo =

Island in South Korea

- Dong
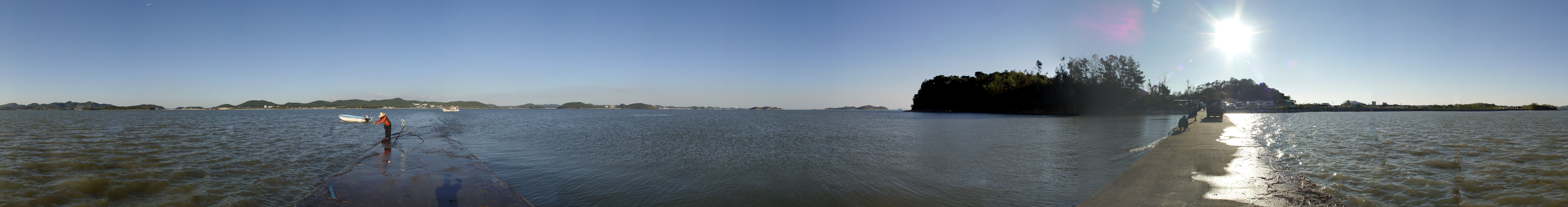
- View from Malbuheung

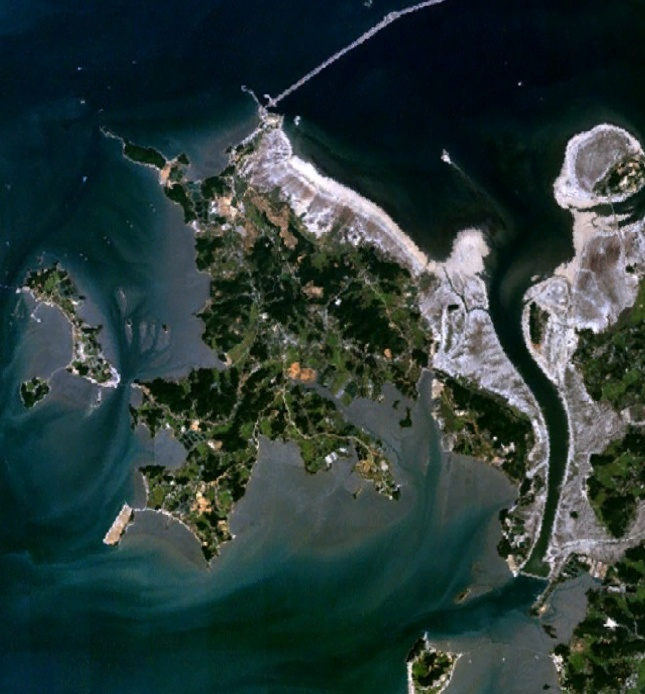

- Location in South Korea
- Coordinates: 37°16′N 126°35′E
- Country: South Korea
- Region: Sudogwon
- Administrative divisions: 5 dong

Area
  - Total: 41.98 km^{2} (16.21 sq mi)

Population (December 31, 2009)
  - Total: 7,114
  - Density: 169.46/km^{2} (438.9/sq mi)
  - Dialect: Seoul

Korean name
- Hangul: 대부도
- Hanja: 大阜島
- RR: Daebudo
- MR: Taebudo

Designations

Ramsar Wetland
- Official name: Daebudo Tidal Flat
- Designated: 25 October 2018
- Reference no.: 2359

Daebudo (Korean: 대부도) is an island in the Yellow Sea, within the municipal borders of the city of Ansan, Gyeonggi Province, South Korea.

== Geography ==
The island has a population of roughly 7,114 people and an area of 41.98 km². Administratively, the island today is divided into five dong: Daebubuk-dong (대부북동), Daebunam-dong (대부남동), Daebudong-dong (대부동동), Seongam-dong (선감동) and Pungdo-dong (풍도동). The predominant industries are tourism and fishing.

The island is connected (via Seongam-do and Tan-do) to the mainland in the south-east by road bridges, to Hyeong-do (형도) (and thence the mainland) in the north-east by several routes due to land reclamation efforts, and to Seonjae-do (선재도) (and thence Yeongheung Island (영흥도) and others) to the west by a further road bridge.

=== Environment ===
Due to rising mudflats, the island has merged with neighbouring Seongam-do (선감도) and Tan-do (탄도). It is a Ramsar site and has also been designated an Important Bird Area (IBA) by BirdLife International because its intertidal mudflats support significant populations of breeding Chinese egrets, as well as of dunlins and common greenshanks on passage.

== History ==
Larger map of the Ansan districts. Danwon District covers the west mainland part and stretches to the sea to cover Daebudo and Pungdo islands.

During the Goryeo and Joseon Dynasties, Daebudo was included in the old jurisdiction of Namyang. On March 1, 1914, it was transferred to Bucheon, and on July 1, 1973 responsibility was transferred to Ongjin County (which later became part of Incheon). On December 26, 1994 the island was moved into the jurisdiction of Ansan, where it remains today.

== Education ==
Daebudo has three kindergartens, three elementary schools, one middle school and a high school. The island (specifically Seongam-do) is also home to the Gyeonggi English Village's Ansan Camp, an immersion village for students from Gyeonggi Province.

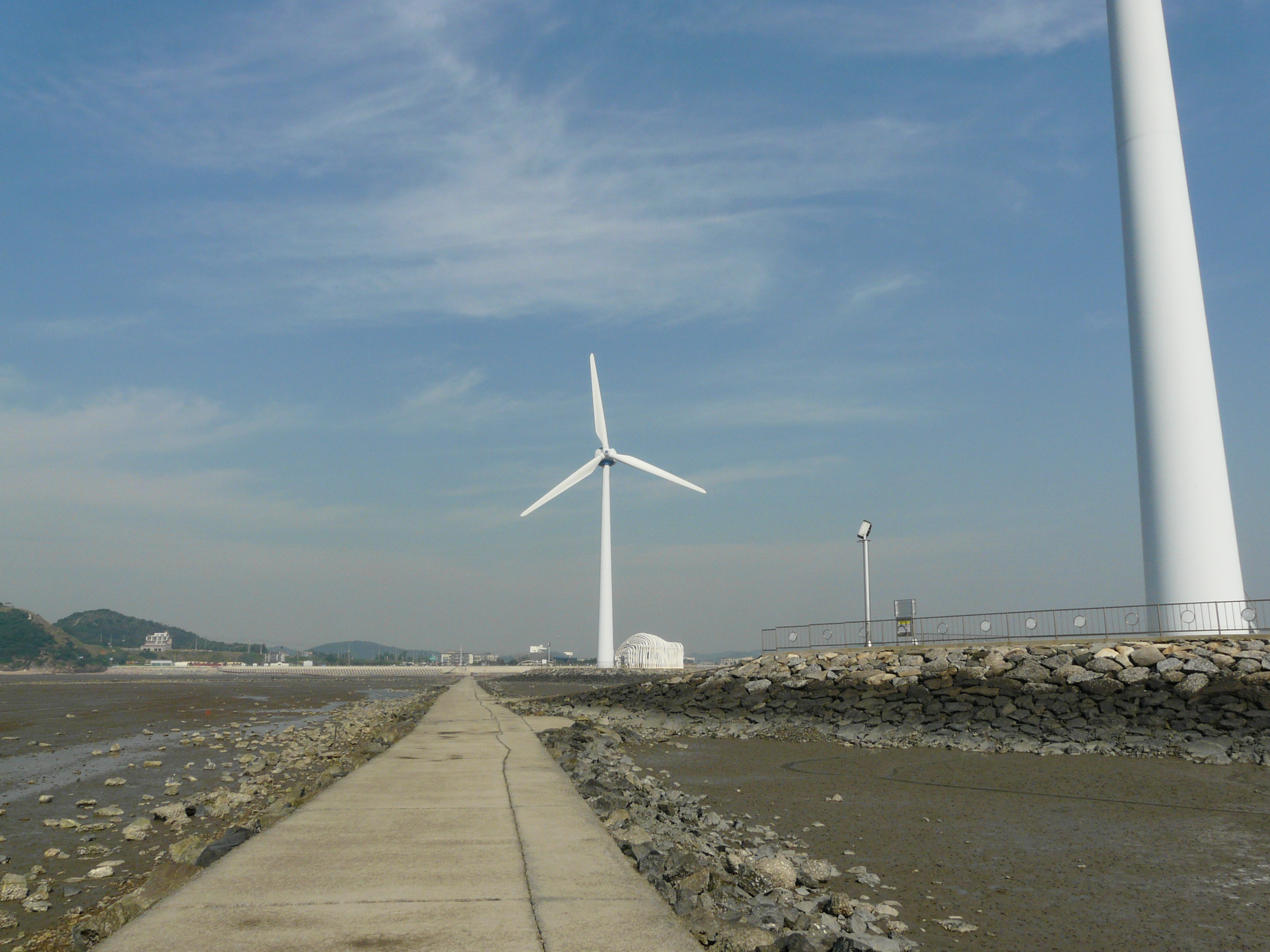
Daebudo

== See also ==
- Islands of South Korea
- Geography of South Korea
