= Yeongheungdo =

Island belonging to South Korea

- Myeon
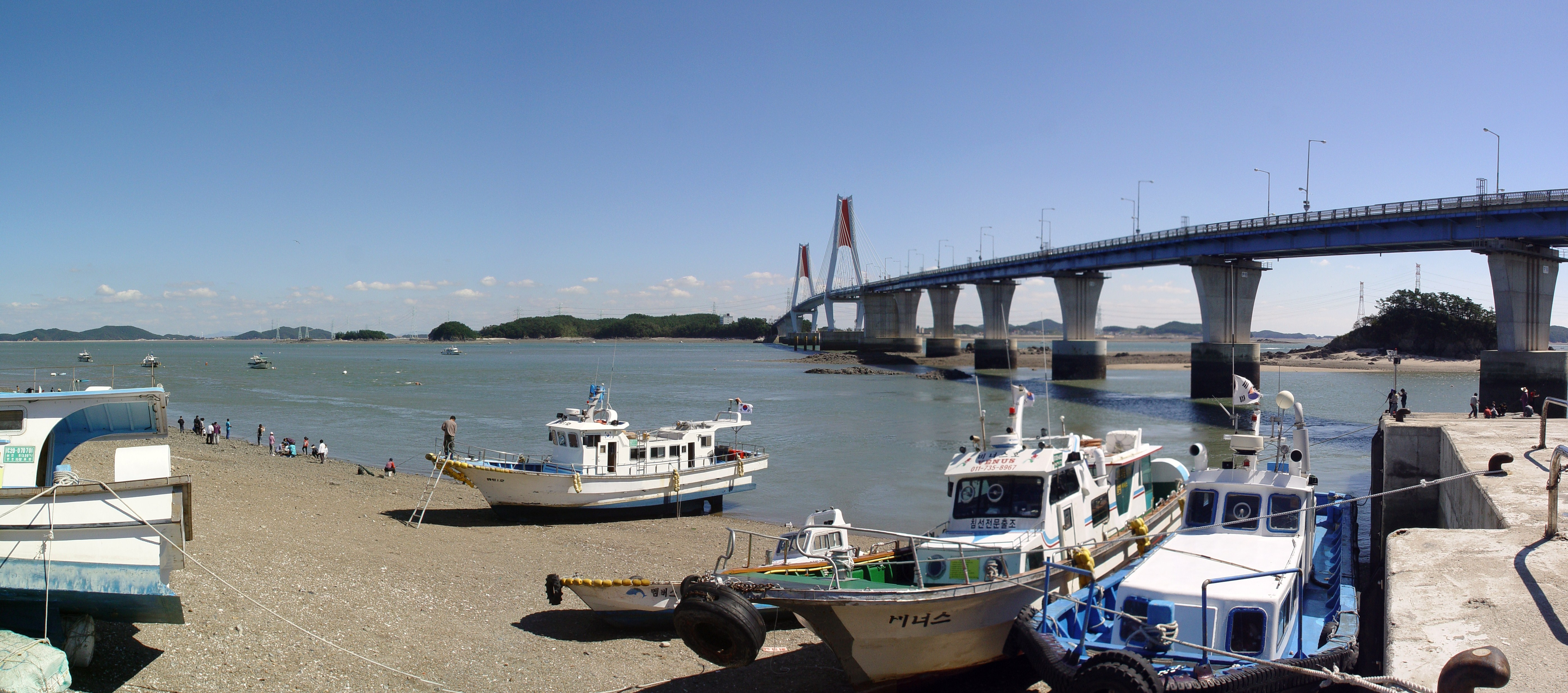
- Yeongheung Bridge
- Interactive map of Yeongheungdo
- Coordinates: 37°16′N 126°28′E
- Country: South Korea
- Region: Sudogwon
- Administrative divisions: 10 li

Area
  - Total: 23.46 km^{2} (9.06 sq mi)

Population (August 2005)
  - Total: 3,951
  - Density: 168.41/km^{2} (436.2/sq mi)
  - Dialect: Seoul

Korean name
- Hangul: 영흥도
- Hanja: 靈興島
- RR: Yeongheungdo
- MR: Yŏnghŭngdo

Yeongheungdo (Korean: 영흥도) is an island in the Yellow Sea, within the municipal borders of Incheon metropolitan city, in South Korea.

== Geography ==
The island has a population of roughly 4000 people and an area of 23.46 km^{2}. The island is connected by road to neighbouring Seonjae-do (선재도) (and thus to Daebu Island and the mainland) by the 1.25 km-long Yeongheung Bridge, which opened in December 2001. Administratively, the island today is divided into ten li: Nae-ri (내리) 1 to 7, and Oi-ri (외리) 1 to 3. Employment is provided through tourism, fishing, and the thermoelectric power station, largely built on reclaimed land on the south-west coast of the island.

=== Environment ===
The island, along with neighbouring Seonjae-do, has been designated an Important Bird Area (IBA) by BirdLife International because its intertidal mudflats support a significant population of breeding Chinese egrets.

== History ==
During the Joseon dynasty and up to 1914, Yeongheungdo was included in the old jurisdiction of Namyang County. In 1914 it was transferred to Bucheon, and in 1973 to Ongjin County, which became part of Incheon metropolitan city in 1995.

Yeongheungdo is featured strongly in the first-hand account The Secrets of Inchon: The Untold Story of the Most Daring Covert Mission of the Korean War. According to The Secrets of Inchon, Yeongheungdo was used for a reconnaissance/commando mission led by Commander Eugene F. Clark to surveil the regions along the Flying Fish Channel, including Wolmido, Daebudo and Muuido, among others. This expedition preceded and allowed for the successful Battle of Incheon.

== Attractions ==
Yeongheungdo has several sandy beaches, most notably Nae-ri (내리) on the east coast, Simripo (십리포) in the north-east, along the edge of which lies a grove of Carpinus coreana, and Janggyeong-ri (장경리) in the north-west.

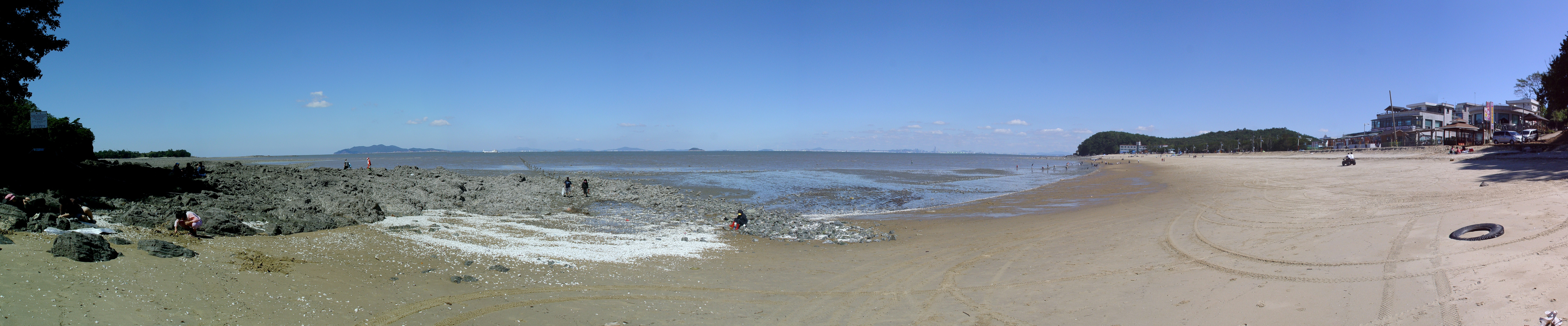
Simripo

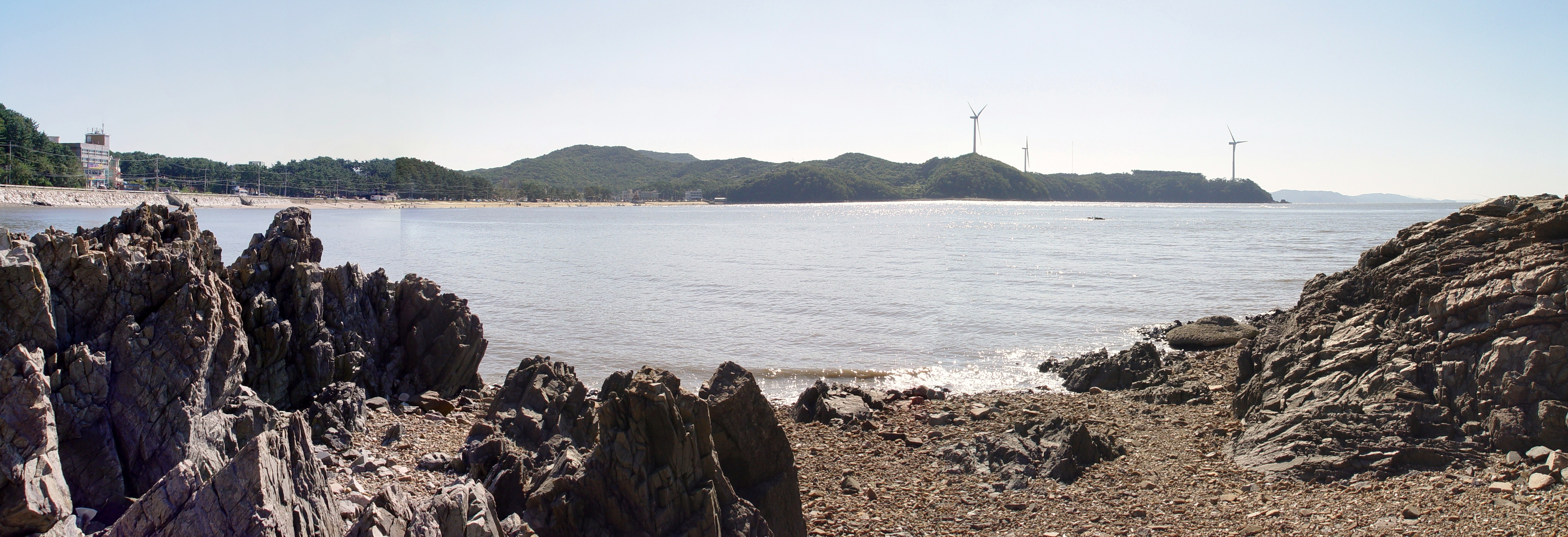
Jeonggyeong-ri

== See also ==
- Yonghungdo Power Station
- Islands of South Korea
- Geography of South Korea
